= 1994 in hip-hop =

This article summarizes the events, album releases, and album release dates in hip hop music for the year 1994.

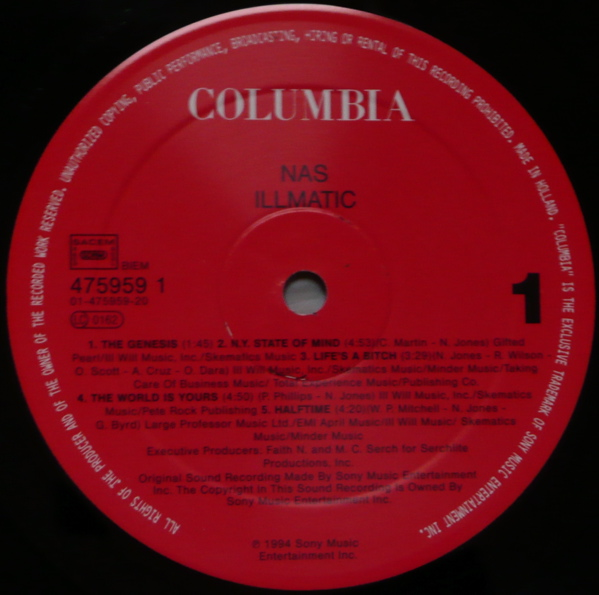
Nas' landmark Illmatic album is widely regarded as one of the greatest and most influential albums of all time.

== Released albums ==
Release Date	Artist	Album
January 4	Frankie Cutlass	The Frankie Cutlass Show
January 4	5ive-O	If U R Not Part Uv Da Solution...
January 8	Natas	Blaz4me
January 11	No Description Given	Game and the Player
January 11	Shadz of Lingo	A View to a Kill
January 11	Sham & The Professor	Split Personalities
January 11	Various Artists	House Party 3 (soundtrack)
January 18	Kurious	A Constipated Monkey
January 18	Yaggfu Front	Action Packed Adventure
January 21	DJ Krush	Krush
January 21	Mysterme & DJ 20/20	Let Me Explain
January 25	The U.M.C.'s	Unleashed
January 25	Spark 950 & Timbo King	United We Slam
January 28	Insane Clown Posse	Ringmaster
January 31	MC ADE	In the Arms of Bass
February 1	Casual	Fear Itself
February 1	Coughee Brothaz	Fadanuf Fa Erybody!!
February 1	E.S.G.	Ocean of Funk
February 1	Fugees	Blunted on Reality
February 1	Schoolly D	Welcome to America
February 8	Beastie Boys	Some Old Bullshit
February 8	Down South	Lost In Brooklyn
February 8	A.D.O.R.	The Concrete
February 18	Kish	A Nation Of Hoods
February 21	Treacherous Three	Old School Flava
February 22	5th Ward Boyz	Gangsta Funk
February 22	Nefertiti	L.I.F.E. (Living in Fear of Extinction)
February 22	Original Flavor	Beyond Flavor
March 1	Hammer	The Funky Headhunter
March 6	Yaggfu Front	Action Packed Adventure
March 8	Gang Starr	Hard to Earn
March 8	S.N.O.P. (Some Nuts Outtha Projects)	Nuttin' All Over Your Face
March 8	Various Artists	Mi Vida Loca (soundtrack)
March 15	Kronic	Da 4 Foot Attack (The EP)
March 22	DFC	Things in tha Hood
March 22	Dred Scott	Breakin' Combs
March 22	Various Artists	Above the Rim (soundtrack)
March 22	Vanilla Ice	Mind Blowin'
March 22	Main Source	Fuck What You Think
March 29	Kool G Rap	Killer Kuts
April 5	The Roots	From the Ground Up
April 5	M.O.P.	To the Death
April 12	Kokane	Funk Upon a Rhyme
April 12	Mystidious Misfitss	A Who Dat?
April 12	Mad Flava	From Tha Ground Unda
April 16	Maestro Fresh Wes	Naaah, Dis Kid Can't Be from Canada?!!
April 18	DJ Kool	20 Minute Workout
April 19	Nas	Illmatic
April 19	Shyheim	AKA the Rugged Child
April 26	Ghetto Mafia	Draw the Line
April 26	Volume 10	Hip-Hopera
April 26	Outkast	Southernplayalisticadillacmuzik
April 26	Raw Fusion	Hoochiefied Funk
April 26	Anotha Level	On Anotha Level
May 2	Various Artists	Proud: An Urban-Pacific Streetsoul Compilation
May 3	KMD	Black Bastards
May 10	Ant Banks	The Big Badass
May 10	Saafir	Boxcar Sessions
May 10	South Central Cartel	'N Gatz We Truss
May 10	The Backyard Rangers	Head for the Hills!!!
May 17	Papa Chuk	The Badlands
May 17	Kirk	Makin' Moves
May 17	Tha Mexakinz	Zig Zag
May 20	12 Gauge	12 Gauge
May 20	Kwest tha Madd Lad	This Is My First Album
May 24	Ahmad	Ahmad
May 24	Heavy D & the Boyz	Nuttin' but Love
May 24	Jeru the Damaja	The Sun Rises in the East
May 24	Master P	The Ghetto's Tryin' to Kill Me!
May 24	Top Quality	Magnum Opus
May 31	69 Boyz	199Quad
May 31	Beastie Boys	Ill Communication
May 31	Seagram	Reality Check
June 1	Trinity Garden Cartel	Don't Blame It on da Music
June 7	Kurtis Blow	The Best of Kurtis Blow
June 7	MC Breed	Funkafied
June 7	Warren G	Regulate... G Funk Era
June 7	Villain	Skanless but True
June 14	Arrested Development	Zingalamaduni
June 21	The Beatnuts	The Beatnuts: Street Level
June 21	Bone Thugs-n-Harmony	Creepin' on ah Come Up
June 21	Terminator X	Super Bad
June 21	Big Mello	Wegonefunkwichamind
June 21	Grand Daddy I.U.	Lead Pipe
June 28	Nice & Smooth	Jewel of the Nile
June 28	Da Brat	Funkdafied
June 28	MC 900 Ft. Jesus	One Step Ahead of the Spider
June 28	Big Mike	Somethin' Serious
June 28	House of Pain	Same as It Ever Was
June 30	Marvaless	Ghetto Blues
July 1	Biz Markie	Biz's Baddest Beats
July 5	Fesu	War with No Mercy
July 5	Hard 2 Obtain	Ism & Blues
July 12	Above the Law	Uncle Sam's Curse
July 12	Luke	Freak for Life
July 19	Coolio	It Takes a Thief
July 19	MC Eiht	We Come Strapped
July 19	Sir Mix-a-Lot	Chief Boot Knocka
July 26	Lighter Shade of Brown	Layin' in the Cut
July 26	Kwamé	Incognito
July 26	Rappin' 4-Tay	Don't Fight the Feelin'
August 2	Ill Al Skratch	Creep Wit' Me
August 2	Sinister	Mobbin' 4 Life
August 5	Insane Clown Posse	The Terror Wheel
August 9	Gravediggaz	6 Feet Deep
August 9	Boogiemonsters	Riders of the Storm: The Underwater Album
August 9	Pooh-Man	Ain't No Love
August 9	Various Artists	West Coast Bad Boyz, Vol. 1: Anotha Level of the Game
August 16	Organized Konfusion	Stress: The Extinction Agenda
August 16	Champ MC	Ghetto Flava
August 16	Bustin' Melonz	Watch Ya Seeds Pop Out
August 16	Funk Daddy	Funk U Right on Up
August 23	Public Enemy	Muse Sick-n-Hour Mess Age
August 23	Menajahtwa	Cha-licious
August 23	Tweedy Bird Loc	No Holds Barred
August 30	UGK	Super Tight
August 30	The Legion	Theme + Echo = Krill
August 30	Various Artists	Fresh (soundtrack)
September 3	G-Slimm	Four Deuces & Trays
September 6	Body Count	Born Dead
September 6	Dru Down	Explicit Game
September 6	Flatlinerz	U.S.A.
September 6	Society	Yes N' Deed (The E.P.)
September 13	Blac Monks	Secrets of the Hidden Temple
September 13	Bloods & Crips	Bangin' on Wax 2... The Saga Continues
September 13	Big Daddy Kane	Daddy's Home
September 13	Freak Nasty	Freak Nasty
September 13	The Notorious B.I.G.	Ready to Die
September 13	Rob Base and DJ E-Z Rock	Break of Dawn
September 13	Dredknotz	Unda Pressure
September 20	Craig Mack	Project Funk da World
September 20	Da Youngsta's	No Mercy
September 20	Dr. Dre	Concrete Roots
September 20	The Goats	No Goats, No Glory
September 26	Thug Life	Thug Life: Volume 1
September 27	Eightball & MJG	On the Outside Looking In
September 27	Michael Peace	Outta Control
September 27	PMD	Shade Business
September 27	Various Artists	Jason's Lyric (soundtrack)
October	Blak Czar	Tales From Da Blak Side
October 4	College Boyz	Nuttin' Less Nuttin' Mo'
October 4	Common Sense	Resurrection
October 4	Dream Warriors	Subliminal Simulation
October 4	Paris	Guerrilla Funk
October 4	KSquad	Realmz Of Da Bushez
October 11	Celly Cel	Heat 4 Yo Azz
October 11	Dis-n-Dat	Bumpin'
October 11	Simple E	Colouz Uv Sound
October 18	Digable Planets	Blowout Comb
October 18	Various Artists	Murder Was the Case
October 18	O.C.	Word...Life
October 18	The Coup	Genocide & Juice
October 18	Scarface	The Diary
October 18	Twista	Resurrection
October 18	Scientifik	Criminal
October 18	Milk	Never Dated
October 25	Artifacts	Between a Rock and a Hard Place
October 25	Fu-Schnickens	Nervous Breakdown
October 25	Extra Prolific	Like It Should Be
October 25	Lil' ½ Dead	The Dead Has Arisen
October 25	Willie D	Play Witcha Mama
October 25	Boogie	Under da Influenz
October 25	Quo	Quo
October 25	Blak Czer	Tales from da Blak Side
October 28	Gospel Gangstaz	Gang Affiliated
November 1	Brand Nubian	Everything Is Everything
November 1	Da Lench Mob	Planet of da Apes
November 1	Lords of the Underground	Keepers of the Funk
November 1	Vicious	Destination Brooklyn
November 7	Rondo & Crazy Rak	The Abused
November 8	Doctor Dré & Ed Lover	Back Up Off Me!
November 8	Goldy	In the Land of Funk
November 8	Keith Murray	The Most Beautifullest Thing in This World
November 8	Kool Moe Dee	Interlude
November 8	Pete Rock & CL Smooth	The Main Ingredient
November 8	Shaquille O'Neal	Shaq Fu: Da Return
November 8	Various Artists	A Low Down Dirty Shame (soundtrack)
November 8	Various artists as West Coast Bad Boyz	West Coast Bad Boyz: High fo Xmas
November 15	Method Man	Tical
November 15	N2Deep	24-7-365
November 15	K-Dee	Ass, Gas, or Cash (No One Rides for Free)
November 15	RBL Posse	Ruthless by Law
November 15	Various Artists	B-Ball Best Kept Secret
November 17	Bushwackass	How Real Israel?
November 17	Al Kapone	Sinista Funk
November 22	Esham	Closed Casket
November 22	Ice Cube	Bootlegs & B-Sides
November 22	Redman	Dare Iz a Darkside
November 22	Sha-Key	A Head Nadda's Journey To Adidi Skizm
November 22	Slick Rick	Behind Bars
November 22	Spice 1	AmeriKKKa's Nightmare
November 25	Three 6 Mafia	Smoked Out, Loced Out
December 6	Black Sheep	Non-Fiction
December 6	Da Bush Babees	Ambushed
December 6	Insane Clown Posse	A Carnival Christmas
December 6	Various Artists	Street Fighter (1994 soundtrack)
Unknown	DJ Paul & Lord Infamous	Come with Me 2 Hell Part 1
Unknown	Gregory D	N***** in da Boot
Unknown	Roots From the Underground	Roots
Unknown	Gangsta Blac	Breakin' the Law
Unknown	Gangsta Shorties	Point of No Return
Unknown	Blackalicious	Melodica
Unknown	Section 8 Mob	Controlled Dangerous Substance
Unknown	O Zone Asylum	Droppin' Dem Dogs

== Highest-charting singles ==
Hip hop singles which charted in the Top 40 of the Billboard Hot 100
Title	Artist	Peak position
"Regulate"	Warren G featuring Nate Dogg	2
"Fantastic Voyage"	Coolio	3
"Whatta Man"	Salt-N-Pepa featuring En Vogue	3
"Funkdafied"	Da Brat	6
"Getto Jam"	Domino	7
"Gin and Juice"	Snoop Doggy Dogg	8
"Who Am I? (What's My Name?)"	Snoop Doggy Dogg	8
"Tootsee Roll"	69 Boyz	8
"Flava in Ya Ear"	Craig Mack	9
"This D.J."	Warren G	9
"Keep Ya Head Up"	2Pac	12
"U Better Recognize"	Sam Sneed	16
"Got Me Waiting"	Heavy D & the Boyz	20
"Thuggish Ruggish Bone"	Bone Thugs-n-Harmony	22
"Bop Gun (One Nation)"	Ice Cube featuring George Clinton	23
"Born to Roll"	Masta Ace Incorporated	23
"Back in the Day"	Ahmad	26
"Pumps and a Bump"	Hammer	26
"Juicy"	The Notorious B.I.G.	27
"Sweet Potatoe Pie"	Domino	27
"You Know How We Do It"	Ice Cube	30
"None of Your Business"	Salt-N-Pepa	32
"Heaven 'n Hell"	Salt-N-Pepa	32
"Give It Up"	Public Enemy	33
"Playaz Club"	Rappin' 4-Tay	36
"Get Down"	Craig Mack	37
"Fa All Y'all"	Da Brat	37
"I Seen a Man Die"	Scarface	37
"Player's Ball"	Outkast	37
"Nuttin' But Love"	Heavy D & the Boyz	40

== Highest first-week sales ==
List of top ten albums with the highest first-week home market sales of 1994
Number	Album	Artist	1st-week sales	1st-week position	Refs
1	Murder Was the Case	Various Artist	329,000	1	West Coast Hip Hop
2	Creepin on ah Come Up	Bone Thugs-N-Harmony	220,000	12	Midwest Hip Hop
3	Regulate... G Funk Era	Warren G	176,000	2	West Coast Hip Hop
4	Tical	Method Man	120,000	4	East Coast Hip Hop

== See also ==
- Last article: 1993 in hip hop music
- Next article: 1995 in hip hop music
