= Flatlinerz discography =

Flatlinerz is a hip hop group from Brooklyn, New York. The group was one of the early acts involved in the horrorcore genre of Hip-Hop, along with The Gravediggaz.

== Albums ==
=== Studio ===
| Year | Title | Chart positions | |
| Year | Title | U.S. R&B | U.S. Heat |
|---|---|---|---|
| 1994 | U.S.A.: Released: September 6, 1994; Label: Def Jam | 65 | 24 |

=== EPs ===
| Year | Title |
|---|---|
| 2016 | 6ix: Chapter 1: Released: June 6, 2016; Label: Horror House Entertainment |

| Year | Title |
|---|---|
| 2017 | 66ix: Chapter 2: Released: June 6, 2017; Label: Horror House Entertainment |

| Year | Title |
|---|---|
| 2017 | 6ix: RevilATIONZ The Flatline Metal Sessions: Released: August 2, 2017; Label: Horror House Entertainment |

| Year | Title |
|---|---|
| 2018 | 666ix: Chapter 3: Released: June 6, 2018; Label: Horror House Entertainment |

| Year | Title |
|---|---|
| 2018 | 6ix: PURGEatory The Flatline Metal Sessions: Released: July 4, 2018; Label: Horror House Entertainment |

=== Compilation albums ===
| Year | Title |
|---|---|
| 1994 | The Fear (Original Motion Picture Soundtrack: Released: November 29, 1994; Label: Warlock Records |

| Year | Title |
|---|---|
| 2014 | Definitive Creepy Collection: Released: September 9, 2014; Label: Independent |

| Year | Title |
|---|---|
| 2016 | Snowgoons: Goon Bap: Released: December 12, 2016; Label: Goon MuSick |

| Year | Title |
|---|---|
| 2017 | Reel Wolf: Sinema: Released: August 2, 2017; Label: Reel Wolf Productions |

=== Singles ===
- Satanic Verses
- Live Evil (#35 Hot Rap Singles)
- Rivaz of Red
- Bring Pain
- Give Me Room
- Trained To Kill
- Da Linerz Iz Attackin
- Sinema
- Gucci's Different
