= Adriana Live! Tour =

2011 concert tour by Adriana Evans

- Tour by Adriana Evans
- Associated album: Walking with the Night
- Start date: June 24, 2011
- End date: June 25, 2011
- Legs: 1
- No. of shows: 2 in London, UK

Adriana Live! was a two-day concert tour by American soul/jazz singer-songwriter Adriana Evans, and featured special guest soul singer, Hilz (formerly of Hil St. Soul). Evans performed songs from her latest album, Walking with the Night and a selection of songs from previous album's El Camino Adriana Evans and Nomadic.

== Opening acts ==
- Hilz

== Set list ==
1. "Hey Now"
2. "Love Is All Around"
3. "Let You Get Away"
4. "Hey Brother"
5. "Bluebird"
6. "Suddenly"
7. "Reality"
8. "I Hear Music"
9. "Weatherman"
10. "Surrender"
11. "Looking for Your Love"
12. "Seein' Is Believing"
13. "Heaven"

== Tour dates ==
Date	City	Country	Venue
June 24, 2011	London	United Kingdom	The Jazz Café
June 25, 2011	London	United Kingdom	The Jazz Café
