= The Awakening (PMD album) =

Studio album by PMD
- Released: June 17, 2003
- Recorded: 2002–2003
- Genre: Hip-hop
- Length: 52:51
- Label: Solid
- Producer: Matt Slywka (exec.); PMD (also exec.); 7L; Alchemist; DJ Honda; DJ Lyve; DJ Muggs; Dre Meezy; Erick Sermon; Ghetto Professionals; Ground Work; KutMasta Kurt; Pete Rock; Raheem Soto; Track Addicts

PMD chronology
Underground Connection (2002)	The Awakening (2003)	Welcome to the Goondox (2013)

Singles from The Awakening
- 1. "Buckwild / Back To Work" Released: April 22, 2003; 2. "Straight From Da Heart / Next Chapter" Released: July 22, 2003; 3. "Look At You Now" Released: October 7, 2003

Professional ratings
Review scores
Source	Rating
laut.de	3/5 stars
RapReviews	5.5/10

The Awakening is the third solo studio album by American rapper PMD. It was released on June 17, 2003 via Solid Records. Production was handled by EPMD, DJ Honda, Track Addicts, 7L, Alchemist, DJ Lyve, DJ Muggs, Dre Meezy, the Ghetto Professionals, Ground Work, KutMasta Kurt, Pete Rock and Raheem Solo. It features guest appearances from Don Fu-Quan, 275, Cypress Hill, Fat Joe, Feever, J Boogie, Krazy Drayz, K-Solo, Rah, Rob Jackson, and Erick Sermon, who appeared on the EPMD reunion track "Look At U Now".

The album produced three singles: "Buckwild" b/w "Back To Work", "Straight From Da Heart" b/w "Next Chapter" and "Look at You Now". The song "Know What I Mean" was previously released on PMD and DJ Honda's 2002 collaborative project Underground Connection. Along with PMD's previous solo works — Shadē Business and Bu$ine$$ I$ Bu$ine$$ — it was merged into a double disc compilation album Shade Business / Business Is Business / The Awakening released in 2013.

== Track listing ==
No.	Title	Producer(s)	Length
1.	"Intro"	PMD; 7L	1:52
2.	"P's Still Dangerous"	PMD	1:50
3.	"87' to the Present"	Ghetto Professionals	2:57
4.	"Wake Up" (Interlude)	Raheem Soto	2:06
5.	"The Awakening"	Alchemist	3:42
6.	"Know What I Mean" (featuring Rob Jackson, 275, J-Boogie and Don Fu-Quan)	DJ Honda	5:19
7.	"Hip Hop 101"	DJ Honda	2:49
8.	"Still a Customer" (featuring 275)	Dre Meezy; PMD (co.)	3:55
9.	"Straight from da Heart"	KutMasta Kurt	3:07
10.	"Next Chapter" (featuring Drayz and Don Fu-Quan)	Track Addicts	3:18
11.	"Let It Go" (Interlude)		0:44
12.	"Champions" (featuring Cypress Hill)	DJ Muggs	2:32
13.	"EPMD Live Show" (Interlude)		0:14
14.	"Look at U Now" (featuring Erick Sermon)	EPMD	3:44
15.	"Back to Work" (featuring Fat Joe and K-Solo)	PMD	4:04
16.	"All's I Need" (featuring 275 and Don Fu-Quan)	Ground Work	3:58
17.	"L.I. to L.E.S." (featuring Feever, Rah and Don Fu-Quan)	Track Addicts	3:37
18.	"Buckwild"	Pete Rock	3:03
Total length:			52:51
