= Walking with the Night =

Studio album by Adriana Evans
- Released: February 22, 2010
- Recorded: 2009
- Genres: R&B; jazz; soul; samba
- Length: 58:01
- Label: Expansion Records
- Producers: Dred Scott; Rastine Calhoun lll (co-producer)

Adriana Evans chronology
El Camino (2007)	Walking with the Night (2010)

Singles from Walking with the Night
- 1. "Weatherman" Released: April 2010; 2. "Surrender" Released: July 2010; 3. "Suddenly" Released: 2010

Walking with the Night is the fourth studio album by American neo soul/jazz singer Adriana Evans, released through Expansion Records in 2010. The new release was voted album of the month by Soul Express, and features the critically acclaimed single "Weatherman", "Let You Get Away" and "Suddenly"

In the summer of 2011, Evans toured Europe on her, Adriana Live! Tour, which included two sold-out shows at London's Jazz Café. Evans performed songs from the new album, and her earlier albums.

== Track listing ==
All songs written by Jonathan "Dred" Scott and Adriana Evans, unless noted.

No.	Title	Writer(s)	Length
1.	"Waiting"	Jonathan Scott	4:15
2.	"Suddenly"		4:15
3.	"Midnight"		4:01
4.	"Love Me on the One"		4:12
5.	"Never Thought"		3:57
6.	"Surrender"	Scott	4:45
7.	"Astral Projection"	Scott	2:13
8.	"Let You Get Away"	Scott	4:04
9.	"Sooner or Later"	Scott	3:36
10.	"Walking With the Night"	Scott	4:02
11.	"Weatherman"		3:58
12.	"El Sol"		6:14
13.	"Set in Stone"	Scott	3:35
14.	"Weatherman" (Extended 12" Mix)		4:55

Japanese edition (bonus track)
No.	Title	Length
15.	"Surrender" (Cut Creator$ Remix)	4:43

Notes

Tracks: "Weatherman" and "El Sol" co-produced by Rastine Calhoun lll

== Personnel ==
- Adrian Evans: All Vocals
- Jonathan Scott: Producer
- Rastine Calhoun lll: Co-producer
- Jonathan Scott: Keyboards (Tracks 1, 2, 4, 5, 6, 7, 9, 10)
- Tiago Derrick: Guitar (Tracks 1, 2, 4, 6, 7, 8, 10, 12)
- Bjon Watson: Trumpet (Tracks 1, 2, 4, 5, 6, 8, 9, 10)
- Louis Van Taylor: Flute, Saxophone (Tracks, Sax: 1, 4, 6, 8, Flute: 9, 10)
- Andre de Santana: Bass (Tracks 4, 7, 8, 10)
- Rastine Calhoun lll: Saxophone, Flute (Tracks, Flute: 3, Sax: 11, 12)
- David Williams: Mastered
- Tiago Derrick: Recorded, Mixed

== Credits ==
- Producer – Jonathan Dred Scott
- Co-producer – Rastine Calhoun lll
- Remix Producers – Sui & DJ Souljah: "Surrender (Cut Creator$ Remix)"

== Notes ==
- Japanese edition includes a bonus track.
