= Back Again =

Back Again may refer to:

== Albums ==
- Back Again (Bob Brookmeyer album), 1978
- Back Again! (Mr. Cheeks album), 2003
- Back Again!!!, a 1992 album by Milira
- Back Again... No Matter What, an album by Boyzone
- Back Again, a 2003 album by Disciple, and the title track

== Songs ==
- "Back Again" (song), a song by Boy Kill Boy 2006
- "Back Again", a song by Rebel Starr from the Noah's Arc: Jumping the Broom film soundtrack
- "Back Again", a 2008 single by Waldo's People
- "Back Again", a 1978 single by Stars
- "Back Again", a 1989 single by Chris Norman
- "Back Again", a song by Parachute from Losing Sleep
