= Live Evil =

Live Evil may refer to:

- Live-Evil (Miles Davis album), 1971
- Live Evil (Black Sabbath album), 1982
- "Live Evil" (song), by Flatlinerz, 1994
- Live Evil (film), a 2009 American horror film
