= Business Is Business =

Business Is business or Les affaires sont les affaires may refer to:

- Les affaires sont les affaires (Mirbeau play) (1903), a stage comedy by Octave Mirbeau
  - Business Is Business (1915 film), an American silent film directed by Otis Turner, based on Mirbeau's play
  - Les affaires sont les affaires (1942 film), a French drama film directed by Jean Dréville, based on Mirbeau's play
- Business Is Business (1971 film), a Dutch comedy film directed by Paul Verhoeven
- Business Is Business (PMD album), 1996
- Business Is Business (Young Thug album), 2023
