= Rugged-n-Raw =

"Rugged-N-Raw"

Single by PMD featuring Das EFX

from the album Business Is Business
- B-side: "Leave Your Style Cramped"
- Released: September 10, 1996
- Recorded: 1996
- Genre: Hip hop
- Length: 4:06
- Label: RCA
- Songwriter(s): Parrish Smith; Angel Aguilar
- Producer(s): 8-Off

PMD singles chronology
"Swing Your Own Thing" (1994)	"Rugged-N-Raw" (1996)	"It's the Pee" (1997)

"Rugged-N-Raw" is the first single released from PMD's second solo album Business Is Business. The song made it to three different Billboard charts, gaining the most success on the Rap charts where it peaked at 19. PMD's fellow Hit Squad members Das EFX contribute verses to the song.

== Single track listing ==
1. "Rugged-N-Raw" (Original)
2. "Rugged-N-Raw" (Remix)
3. "Rugged-N-Raw" (Original Instrumental)
4. "Leave Your Style Cramped"
5. "Rugged-N-Raw" (Solid Scheme Remix)

== Charts ==
Chart	Position
U.S. R&B / Hip-Hop	# 89
Hot Rap Singles	# 19
Hot Dance Music/Maxi-Singles Sales	# 29
