= Back in the Day =

Back in the Day may refer to:

== Film, television, and theatre ==
- Back in the Day (2005 film), an American crime drama starring Ja Rule
- Back in the Day (2014 film), an American comedy starring and directed by Michael Rosenbaum
- Back in the Day (2016 film), an American sports drama film starring William DeMeo
- Back in the Day (game show), a 2005 British comedy quiz programme
- Back in the Day (2006 TV program), an American program repackaging the 1960s and '70s show Car and Track
- Back in the Day, a series on ESPN Classic
- Back in the Day, a 2007 musical by Lance Horne

== Music ==
=== Albums ===
- Back in the Day: The Best of Bootsy, by Bootsy Collins, 1994
- Back in the Day, by G. Love & Special Sauce, 1993

=== Songs ===
- "Back in the Day" (Ahmad song), 1994
- "Back in the Day" (Illegal song), 1994
- "Back in the Day" (Missy Elliott song), 2003
- "Back in the Day (Puff)", by Erykah Badu, 2003
- "Back in the Day", by Bif Naked, 2004
- "Back in the Day", by Blues Traveler from Bridge, 2001
- "Back in the Day", by Buckcherry from 15, 2005
- "Back in the Day", by Christina Aguilera from Back to Basics, 2006
- "Back in the Day", by Dred Scott from Breakin' Combs, 1994
- "Back in the Day", by Megadeth from The System Has Failed, 2004
- "Back in the Day", by Sugababes from The Lost Tapes, 2022
- "Back in the Day", by Wayne Brady from A Long Time Coming, 2008

== Other uses ==
- Back in the Day, a 2022 memoir by Melvyn Bragg
- Back in the Day, a comic strip on GoComics

== See also ==
- Nostalgia
