= Satanic Verses (song) =

Single by Flatlinerz featuring Headless Horsemen

from the album U.S.A.
- B-side: "Run"
- Released: November 22, 1994
- Recorded: 1994
- Genre: East Coast hip hop, horrorcore
- Length: 4:23
- Label: Def Jam
- Songwriters: Tempest, Gravedigger and Redrum
- Producer: DR Period

Flatlinerz singles chronology
"Satanic Verses" (1994)	"Live Evil" (1994)

"Satanic Verses" is the first single by controversial rap group, Flatlinerz from their debut album, U.S.A. It was released on November 22, 1994 through Def Jam Recordings and was produced by DR Period. A music video was shot but was banned from MTV due to its graphic content. The video did, however, go into rotation on The Box, being added in the week dated February 4, 1995.

== Single track listing ==
=== A-side ===
1. "Satanic Verses" (LP Version) – 4:51
2. "Satanic Verses" (Radio Edit) – 3:55
3. "Satanic Verses" (Acappella) – 3:58

=== B-side ===
1. "Satanic Verses" (Instrumental) – 4:51
2. "Run" (LP Version) – 3:25
3. "Run" (Instrumental) – 3:25
