= It's the Pee =

Single by PMD featuring Mobb Deep

from the album Business Is Business
- Released: April 8, 1997
- Recorded: 1996
- Genre: Hip hop
- Length: 3:07
- Label: Relativity
- Songwriter: Parrish Smith
- Producers: PMD; Havoc; Charlie Marotta

PMD singles chronology
| "Rugged-N-Raw" (1996) | "It's the Pee" (1997) |

Mobb Deep singles chronology
| "Front Lines (Hell on Earth)" (1996) | "It's the Pee" (1997) | "G.O.D. Pt. III" (1997) |

"It's the Pee" is the second and final single released from PMD's second album Business Is Business. It peaked at number 82 on the Billboard Hot R&B/Hip-Hop Songs and number 31 on the Hot Rap Songs in the US.

== Track listing ==
1. "It's the Pee '97" (Radio) – 3:07
2. "Many Often Wonder" (Radio) – 2:59
3. "Knick Knack Part 2" (Radio) – 3:23
4. "Kool Kat" (Radio/Clean) – 4:37
5. "It's the Pee '97" (Instrumental) – 3:07
6. "It's the Pee '97" (Street) – 3:08
7. "Many Often Wonder" (Street) – 2:59
8. "Knick Knack Part 2" (Street) – 3:24
9. "Kool Kat" (Album Version) – 4:37
10. "Many Often Wonder" (Instrumental) – 2:52

== Charts ==
| Chart (1997) | Peak position |
|---|---|
| US Hot R&B/Hip-Hop Songs (Billboard) | 82 |
| US Hot Rap Songs (Billboard) | 31 |
