= Noah's Arc: Jumping the Broom (soundtrack) =

Noah's Arc: Jumping the Broom OST

Soundtrack album by Various Artists
- Released: October 21, 2008
- Recorded: 2007–2008
- Genre: R&B, pop, dance, soft rock
- Label: Tommy Boy
- Producer: Various

Various Artists chronology
Noah's Arc: Season 1 (soundtrack) (2006)	Noah's Arc: Jumping the Broom OST (2008)	Noah's Arc: Mixtape, Volume 1 (2011)

Noah's Arc: Jumping the Broom is a music soundtrack to the motion picture of the same name starring Darryl Stephens and Jensen Atwood. It was released on October 21, 2008, by Tommy Boy Records. The soundtrack features artists such as Michelle Williams, Bob Sinclar, Roy Young, Phoebe Snow, Patrik-Ian Polk, Nikki Jane and Adriana Evans.

== Track listing ==
1. "We Break the Dawn (Karmatronic Remix)" (Performed by Michelle Williams) - 4:02
2. "Sandcastle Disco (Karmatronic Remix)" (Performed by Solange) - 7:51
3. "The Idiot" (Performed by Fol Chen featuring Patrik-Ian Polk) - 2:45
4. "World, Hold On (Children of the Sky)" (Performed by Bob Sinclar and Steve Edwards) - 3:20
5. "Cable TV" (Performed by Fol Chen) - 3:02
6. "Him and Not Me" (Performed by Patrik-Ian Polk) - 3:29
7. "End of the World" (Performed by Matt Alber) - 3:19
8. "Don't Call It Love" (Performed by Roy Young) - 3:09
9. "Come Clean" (Performed by Phoebe Snow) - 4:01
10. "I Love U" (Performed by Nikki Jane) - 3:56
11. "Today Tomorrow" (Performed by Tje Austin) - 3:34
12. "Spies" (Performed by Sy Smith) - 4:07
13. "Eat Sushi" (Performed by Pam Jones) - 3:20
14. "Something Real" (Performed by Phoebe Snow) - 3:38
15. "Home to Me" (Performed by Patrik-Ian Polk) - 4:39

iTunes exclusive digital bonus track
No.	Title	Writer(s)	Producer(s)	Length
16.	"Remember the Love (Performed by Adriana Evans)"	Adriana Evans, Jonathan Scott	J. Scott "Dred", Adriana Evans	3:49

Deluxe edition exclusive bonus tracks
No.	Title	Writer(s)	Length
17.	"Back Again (Performed by Rebel Starr)"	S. Mickens, M. Lopez	4:03
18.	"Heard It All B4 (Performed by Nikki Jane)"	Joaquin Bynum, Nikki Jane, Von Cannon	4:15
19.	"The Greatest (Performed by Michelle Williams)"	James Scheffer, Rico Love	3:32
20.	"How Could I Know (Performed by Lynn Blades)"	Lynn Blades, Sean Hargreaves	2:49
