= Magnum Opus (Top Quality album) =

Studio album by Top Quality
- Released: May 24, 1994
- Recorded: 1992–1993
- Studio: Black Zone Studio (Long Island, NY); Fingers Studio; Platinum Island Studios (New York, NY)
- Genre: Hip hop
- Length: 39:46
- Label: RCA
- Producer: PMD (exec.); Charlie Marotta; Black Zone; Hell Raisin; Jesse West; John Hall; Keivan Mack; Kevin A. Pyatt; Solid Scheme; Tray Bag

Singles from Magnum Opus
- 1. "Magnum Opus" Released: September 13, 1993; 2. "I Can't Hear You" Released: May 9, 1994

Professional ratings
Review scores
Source	Rating
AllMusic	2/5 stars
The Source	3.5/5

Magnum Opus is the only studio album by American rapper Top Quality. It was released on May 24, 1994, though RCA Records. Recording sessions took place at Black Zone Studio in Long Island, Fingers Studio and Platinum Island Studios in New York City. Production was handled by Charlie Marotta, Jesse West, Black Zone, Hell Raisin, John Hall, Keivan Mack, Kevin A. Pyatt, Solid Scheme and Tray Bag, with PMD serving as executive producer.

Though it had input from PMD, the album found nowhere near the amount of success that EPMD and members of their Hit Squad had attained. Magnum Opus only made it to number 95 on the Billboard's Top R&B/Hip-Hop Albums and its two singles, "Magnum Opus" and "I Can't Hear You", as well as a promotional single "What", failed to appear on any Billboard charts. After the album's failure, Top Quality was dropped from the label.

== Track listing ==
No.	Title	Producer(s)	Length
1.	"Messages From Uptown"	Hell Raisin	3:15
2.	"Someone So Fly"	Kevin A. Pyatt; Charlie Marotta (co.)	2:51
3.	"Caught up in the Flizny"	John Hall	3:25
4.	"Magnum Opus"	Keivan Mack	3:42
5.	"Check the Credentials"	Black Zone	3:50
6.	"What"	Jesse West	4:44
7.	"You Gotta Check It"	Charlie Marotta	3:54
8.	"Something New"	Tray Bag	2:44
9.	"I Can't Hear You"	Solid Scheme	3:23
10.	"Graveyard Shift"	Charlie Marotta	3:48
11.	"U Know My Name"	Jesse West	4:10
Total length:			39:46

== Personnel ==
- T. "Top Quality" Robinson – lyrics, vocals
- Hell Raisin – producer (track 1)
- Kevin A. Pyatt – producer (track 2)
- John "Drama" Hall – producer (track 3)
- Keivan Mack – producer (track 4)
- Black Zone – producer (track 5)
- Jesse "3rd Eye" Williams III – producer (tracks: 6, 11)
- Charlie Marotta – producer (tracks: 7, 10), co-producer (track 2)
- Tracy "Tray Bag" Smith – producer (track 8)
- Chris Charity – producer (track 9)
- Derek Lynch – producer (track 9)
- Parrish "PMD" Smith – executive producer
- Jacqueline "Jackie" Murphy – art direction
- Sean Mosher-Smith – design
- Michael Lavine – photography
