= Kim Tibbs =

American singer-songwriter

- Origin: Huntsville, Alabama, U.S.
- Genres: R&B/soul
- Occupations: Singer, songwriter
- Instrument: B-3 Hammond organ
- Label: Expansion Records
- Website: www.kimtibbsmusic.com

Kim Tibbs is an American professional musician and songwriter, originally from Huntsville, Alabama, United States. She is a current soul music recording artist under Expansion Records in London.

Her album, Kim, was released in 2017.

Her album, “THE SCiENCE OF COMPLETiON VOLUME I”, was released in 2022.
