= El Camino (Adriana Evans album) =

Studio album by Adriana Evans
- Released: April 10, 2007 (Europe); March 18, 2007 (Japan re-issue)
- Recorded: 2006, 2007 (Clear Lake Audio, Burbank, California)
- Genres: R&B; afro-cuban; soul; latin jazz; samba
- Length: 49:31
- Labels: Expansion Records, Lexingtion
- Producers: Dred Scott, Adriana Evans

Adriana Evans chronology
Kismet (2005)	El Camino (2007)	Walking with the Night (2010)

Singles from El Camino
- 1. "Hey Now" Released: March 2007; 2. "All for Love" Released: 2007; 3. "Before You" Released: 2007

El Camino is the third studio album by American R&B/soul artist Adriana Evans, released in April 2007 under Expansion Records. The album was written and produced by Evans herself, along with music producer husband Jonathan "Dred" Scott. The release features 12 new tracks including the UK singles, "Hey Now", "Before You" and "All for Love", and the stand out ballads "Blue Bird" and "Same As I Ever Was". The album was reissued in Japan and includes extra bonus tracks.

== Track listing ==
All tracks written by Adriana Evans and Jonathan "Dred" Scott, unless noted.

No.	Title	Writer(s)	Length
1.	"Hey Now"	Jonathan Scott	3:58
2.	"All for Love"	Scott	4:25
3.	"Calling Me"		4:21
4.	"Underneath the Stars"	Scott	4:46
5.	"Before You"	Scott	4:22
6.	"Blue Bird"	Scott	4:45
7.	"Never Knew"		4:15
8.	"Blue Bird in Bahia"		3:31
9.	"World on Fire"		4:14
10.	"Same as I Ever Was"		4:43
11.	"Undercover"		3:40
12.	"El Camino"	Adriana Evans	2:31

Japanese edition (bonus tracks)
No.	Title	Length
13.	"Hey Now" (Gota Remix)	6:37
14.	"Hey Now" (Electric Remix)	3:39
15.	"All for Love" (Backpack Remix)	4:46

== Personnel ==
- Adrian Evans: All Vocals
- Jonathan Scott: Producer
- Adriana Evans: Co-producer
- Luke Miller: Keyboards (Tracks 1, 4, 5, 6, 7, 9, 10)
- Samir Elmehdaoui: Bass Guitar (Tracks 1, 2, 3, 4, 5, 6, 7, 8, 9, 10, 12)
- Bjon Watson: Trumpet (Tracks 2, 6, 10)
- Louis Van Taylor: Flute, Saxophone (Tracks, Flute & Sax: 1, Flute: 3, Flute & Sax: 6)
- David Williams: Mastered
- Preston Boebel: Recorded, Mixed

== Credits ==
- Producer – Jonathan Dred Scott
- Co-producer – Adriana Evans
- Remix Producers – Gota Yashiki: "Hey Now (Gota Remix)", Johnathan Dred Scott: "Hey Now (Electric Remix)", "All for Love (Backpack Remix)"

== Notes ==
- Japanese Edition includes 3 bonus tracks
