= HII (album) =

h II

Studio album by DJ Honda
- Released: November 12, 1997 (Japan); March 24, 1998 (worldwide)
- Studio: The Hit Factory (New York City); Power Play Studios (Long Island City, New York); Streeterville Studios (Chicago); Honda's Crib
- Genre: Hip-hop
- Length: 1:04:00 (Japan); 57:32 (worldwide)
- Label: Sony; Relativity; Epic
- Producer: Peter Kang (exec.); Taka Ozeki (exec.); DJ Honda; Mista Sinista; Roc Raida; V.I.C.

DJ Honda chronology
| h (1995-1996) | h II (1997) | h 2000 (1999) |

Professional ratings
Review scores
| Source | Rating |
|---|---|
| AllMusic | 4/5 stars |
| Entertainment Weekly | B+ |
| Los Angeles Times | 3/4 stars |
| The Source | 3/5 stars |

h II is the second album by Japanese producer DJ Honda. It was released on November 12, 1997, via Sony Records in Japan and on March 24, 1998, via Relativity Records and Epic Records in North America and Europe. Audio production of the album was solely handled by DJ Honda, except for three tracks of its worldwide version produced by Mista Sinista, Roc Raida, and V.I.C. respectively. It features guest appearances from various hip-hop artists, including Camp Lo, Cuban Link, De La Soul, KRS-One, Mos Def, and The Beatnuts, among others.

The album peaked at number 57 on the Billboard Top R&B/Hip-Hop Albums chart and number 16 on the Heatseekers Albums chart. It also spawned seven singles, but only two of them reached music charts: "Travellin' Man" (No. 76 on Hot R&B/Hip-Hop Songs and No. 17 on Hot Rap Songs) and "On The Mic" (No. 89 on Hot R&B/Hip-Hop Songs).

== Track listing ==
All music is composed by DJ Honda.

1997 version
| No. | Title | Length |
|---|---|---|
| 1. | "Trouble in the Water" (featuring De La Soul) | 3:45 |
| 2. | "Disco T-E-C" (featuring Camp Lo) | 5:02 |
| 3. | "Blaze It Up" (featuring Black Attack & Kia Jeffreys) | 4:31 |
| 4. | "Mista Sinista Interlude" | 1:02 |
| 5. | "Intro" | 0:17 |
| 6. | "Team Players" (featuring KRS-One & King Doe-V) | 4:51 |
| 7. | "Answering Machine" | 2:32 |
| 8. | "Talk About It" (featuring Al Tariq) | 3:12 |
| 9. | "When You Hot You Hot" (featuring Dug Infinite & No I.D.) | 4:12 |
| 10. | "Fat Lip Interlude" (featuring Fatlip) | 1:05 |
| 11. | "For Every Day That Goes By" (featuring Rawcotiks) | 3:30 |
| 12. | "5 Seconds" (featuring Black Attack) | 4:15 |
| 13. | "Example" (featuring Roc Raida) | 1:09 |
| 14. | "Stretch Armstrong and Lord Seer Interlude" | 1:09 |
| 15. | "Who the Trifest?" (featuring The Beatnuts) | 3:37 |
| 16. | "Long Island to Japan" (featuring DJ EV) | 0:21 |
| 17. | "Go Crazy" (featuring S-On) | 2:52 |
| 18. | "Around the Clock" (featuring Problemz) | 3:23 |
| 19. | "R-Beat" | 0:25 |
| 20. | "Sometimes I Think..." (featuring Rawcotiks) | 3:21 |
| 21. | "WF II" (featuring Al Tariq, Black Attack, Cuban Link, Juju, Problemz & V.I.C.) | 3:45 |
| 22. | "Kill the Noise (Remix)" (featuring Problemz) | 3:16 |
| 23. | "Fuk Dat" (featuring Black Attack) | 3:14 |
| Total length: | | 1:04:00 |

Sample credits

- "Trouble in the Water" contains elements from "B & G (Midwestern Nights Dream)" by The Gary Burton Quartet & Eberhard Weber (1977)
- "Disco T-E-C" contains elements from "Feels So Real (Won't Let Go)" by Patrice Rushen (1984)
- "Blaze It Up" contains elements from "Top Billin'" by Audio Two (1987)
- "Mista Sinista Interlude" contains elements from "Change the Beat (Female Version)" by Beside (1982)
- "Team Players" contains elements from "Blue Lick" by Bob James (1979)
- "When You Hot You Hot" contains elements from "If I Ever Lose This Heaven" by Coke Escovedo (1975)
- "For Every Day That Goes By" contains elements from "Did You Hear What They Said?" by Gil Scott-Heron & Brian Jackson (1972) and "Street Life" by The Crusaders & Randy Crawford (1979)
- "5 Seconds" contains elements from "Paradise" by Grover Washington, Jr. (1979)
- "Who the Trifest?" contains elements from "For Real" by Roy Ayers & Wayne Henderson (1978) and "Bring the Noise" by Public Enemy (1987)
- "Around the Clock" contains elements from "Song of Innocence" by David Axelrod (1968)

1998 version
| No. | Title | Writer(s) | Producer(s) | Length |
|---|---|---|---|---|
| 1. | "Roc Raida Intro" (featuring Roc Raida) | A. Williams | Roc Raida | 1:10 |
| 2. | "Trouble in the Water" (featuring De La Soul) | K. Honda; D. Jolicoeur; K. Mercer | DJ Honda | 3:45 |
| 3. | "5 Seconds" (featuring Black Attack) | K. Honda; S. Boston | DJ Honda | 3:59 |
| 4. | "Hai!" (featuring Keith Murray & 50 Grand) | K. Honda; G. Berlin; K. Murray; C. Briggs; D. Wansel | DJ Honda | 3:26 |
| 5. | "Every Now & Then" (featuring Infamous Syndicate) | K. Honda; L. Harland; R. Guy; D. Matthews | DJ Honda | 2:21 |
| 6. | "Mista Sinista Interlude" (featuring Mista Sinista) | J. Wright | Mista Sinista | 1:04 |
| 7. | "Team Players" (featuring KRS-One & King Doe-V) | K. Honda; L. Parker; D. McKay; R. James | DJ Honda | 4:42 |
| 8. | "On the Mic" (featuring Cuban Link, Juju, A.L. & Missin' Linx) | K. Honda; A. Mosquera; F. Delgado; J. Tineo; B. Smalls; S. Boston; C. Bullock; V. Padilla; D. Davies; R. Walters; J. Johnson | DJ Honda; V.I.C. | 3:45 |
| 9. | "For Every Day That Goes By" (featuring The Rawcotiks) | K. Honda; B. Castillo; J. Valentine | DJ Honda | 3:31 |
| 10. | "WKCR Interlude" (featuring Lord Sear & Stretch Armstrong) | | DJ Honda | 0:52 |
| 11. | "Who the Trifest?" (featuring The Beatnuts) | K. Honda; J. Tineo; L. Fernandez | DJ Honda | 3:36 |
| 12. | "Talk About It" (featuring Al Tariq) | K. Honda; B. Smalls | DJ Honda | 3:12 |
| 13. | "Blaze It Up" (featuring Black Attack) | K. Honda; S. Boston; K. Robinson; N. Robinson | DJ Honda | 4:10 |
| 14. | "DJ Ev Interlude" | K. Honda; E. Hitch | DJ Honda | 0:30 |
| 15. | "Go Crazy" (featuring S-On) | K. Honda; S. Ryan | DJ Honda | 2:52 |
| 16. | "Around the Clock" (featuring Problemz) | K. Honda; C. Bullock; D. Axelrod | DJ Honda | 3:38 |
| 17. | "When You Hot You Hot" (featuring Dug Infinite & No I.D.) | K. Honda; D. Thomas; E. Wilson; L. Ware; P. Sawyer | DJ Honda | 4:12 |
| 18. | "Interlude" (featuring Fat Lip) | K. Honda; D. Stewart | DJ Honda | 1:05 |
| 19. | "Travellin' Man" (featuring Mos Def) | K. Honda; D. Smith; H. Wheeler | DJ Honda | 5:16 |
| Total length: | | | | 57:32 |

Sample credits

- "Roc Raida Intro" contains elements from "Buffalo Gals" by Malcolm McLaren (1982), "What They Hittin' Foe?" by Ice Cube (1990) and "No Equal" by The Beatnuts (1993)
- "Hai!" contains elements from "Medley: Ike's Rap III/Your Love Is So Doggone Good" by Isaac Hayes (1971) and "When I'm Gone" by The Jones Girls (1980)
- "Every Now & Then" contains elements from "Crab Apple" by Idris Muhammad (1977)
- "On the Mic" contains elements from "Mary Jane" by Rick James (1978), "La Di Da Di" by Doug E. Fresh & Slick Rick (1985), "Pass the Dutchie" by Musical Youth (1982) and "All Night Long" by Mary Jane Girls (1983)
- "Travellin' Man" contains elements from "Whatever's Fair" by Jerry Butler (1973), "Latoya" by Just-Ice (1986) and "Black Cream" by Harold Wheeler (1975)

== Personnel ==
- Katsuhiro Hōnda – main artist, producer, scratches, recording
- Anthony Williams – performer ("Example" and "Roc Raida Intro"), producer & scratches ("Roc Raida Intro")
- Joel Wright – performer & producer ("Mista Sinista Interlude")
- Victor Padilla – performer ("WF II"), producer ("On The Mic")
- Peter Kang – executive producer
- Taka Ozeki – executive producer
- E. "DJ EV" Hitch – scratches ("Long Island To Japan" and "DJ Ev Interlude")
- Tony "CD" Kelly – keyboards ("Blaze It Up", "Hai!" and "On The Mic")
- Adrian Bartos – performer ("Stretch Armstrong And Lord Seer Interlude" and "WKCR Interlude")
- Alex Mosquera – performer ("On The Mic")
- Berntony Smalls – performer ("On The Mic", "Talk About It" and "WF II")
- Bladmillo Castillo – performer ("For Every Day That Goes By" and "Sometimes I Think...")
- C. Bullock – performer ("Around The Clock", "Kill The Noize (Remix)", "On The Mic" and "WF II")
- Dante Terrell Smith – performer ("Travellin' Man")
- David Jude Jolicoeur – performer ("Trouble In The Water")
- Derrick Lemel Stewart – performer ("Fat Lip Interlude"/"Interlude")
- Doug 'Dug Infinite' Thomas – performer ("When You Hot You Hot")
- Ernest Dion Wilson – performer ("When You Hot You Hot")
- Felix "Cuban Link" Delgado – performer ("On The Mic" and "WF II")
- Gerald W. Berlin – performer ("Hai!")
- Jeff Valentino – performer ("For Every Day That Goes By" and "Sometimes I Think...")
- Jerry "JuJu" Tineo – performer ("On The Mic", "WF II" and "Who The Trifest?")
- Keith Murray – performer ("Hai!")
- Kelvin Mercer – performer ("Trouble In The Water")
- Kia Jeffreys – performer ("Blaze It Up" and "On The Mic")
- King Doe-V – performer ("Team Players")
- Lateefa Harland – performer ("Every Now & Then")
- Lawrence Parker – performer ("Team Players")
- Lester Fernandez – performer ("Who The Trifest?")
- Lord Sear – performer ("Stretch Armstrong And Lord Seer Interlude" and "WKCR Interlude")
- Rashawnna Guy – performer ("Every Now & Then")
- S-On – performer ("Go Crazy")
- Saladine Wallace – performer ("Disco T-E-C")
- Salahadeen Wilds – performer ("Disco T-E-C")
- Sean Black – performer ("5 Seconds", "Blaze It Up", "Fuk Dat", "On The Mic" and "WF II")
- Chris Conway – mixing & recording
- Dino Zervos – recording
- Kirk Yano – recording
- Tom Coyne – mastering
- Ill Tongue – management
- Hideo Oida – photography
- Piotr Sikora – photography

== Charts ==
| Chart (1998) | Peak position |
|---|---|
| US Top R&B/Hip-Hop Albums (Billboard) | 57 |
| US Heatseekers Albums (Billboard) | 16 |

== Release history ==
| Region | Date | Label(s) |
|---|---|---|
| Japan | November 12, 1997 | Sony Music Entertainment Japan |
| Japan | March 24, 1998 | Sony Music Entertainment Japan |
| United States | March 24, 1998 | Relativity Records |
| Canada | March 24, 1998 | Relativity Records, Epic Records |
| Europe | March 24, 1998 | Epic Records |
