= Top Quality =

American rapper

- Born: T. Robinson
- Origin: White Plains, New York, U.S.
- Genre: Hip hop
- Occupation: Rapper
- Years active: 1992–1998
- Label: RCA
- Formerly of: Hit Squad

T. Robinson, professionally known by his stage name Top Quality is a former American rapper and a member of hip hop collective Hit Squad. Signing to RCA Records in the early 1990s, he became the first rapper from White Plains, New York to get a major record label deal.

After appearing in The Source magazine's Unsigned Hype, a column dedicated to finding unsigned talent, Top Quality eventually caught the eye of PMD, who made him a member of the rap collective Hit Squad and was subsequently signed a deal with RCA Records. His debut album, Magnum Opus was released in May 1994 and was executively produced by Smith himself. The album, however, was a commercial failure. Unlike other Hit Squad releases at the time, Magnum Opus failed to sell many copies and peaked at only No. 95 on the Billboard Top R&B Albums chart.

After being released from RCA, Top Quality appeared on PMD's Shadē Business in 1994 and 3rd Eye's Planets in 1998.

Top Quality has been played on NTS shows including The NCA Show with Brassfoot, with Magnum Opus first played on November 21, 2017.

== Discography ==
Studio albums

| Year | Title | Chart positions |
| Year | Title | U.S. R&B |
|---|---|---|
| 1994 | Magnum Opus: Released: May 24, 1994; Label: RCA | 95 |

Singles

- 1992: "Northbound Renegade" / "Let Me Breathe" / "Who The Hell Am I" (New Image Records)
- 1993: "Magnum Opus" (RCA Records)
- 1994: "I Can't Hear You" (RCA/BMG)
- 1994: "What" (PMD Records) - *promotional single

Guest appearances

- "Fake Homeyz" by PMD and 3rd Eye from Shadē Business (1994)
- "No Shorts and No Sleep" by PMD, 3rd Eye and Zone 7 from Shadē Business (1994)
- "Troopers Represent" by 3rd Eye, Nine, Lord Finesse and Zone 7 from Planets (1998)
