= G.O.D. Pt. III =

Single by Mobb Deep

from the album Hell on Earth
- Released: April 15, 1997
- Genre: East Coast hip hop, hardcore hip hop
- Length: 5:16
- Label: Loud
- Songwriters: Havoc; Prodigy
- Producer: Mobb Deep

Mobb Deep singles chronology
"It's the Pee" (1997)	"G.O.D. Pt. III" (1997)	"Hoodlum" (1997)

"G.O.D. Pt. III" is the fourth single from Mobb Deep's Hell on Earth album. The song contains an interpolation from "Tony's Theme" by Giorgio Moroder from the 1983 film Scarface, and a drum-loop from "Fool Yourself" by Little Feat. The title is a reference to The Godfather Part III. The chorus features Infamous Mobb member Godfather Pt. III.

The song is included on the best of album, Life of the Infamous: The Best of Mobb Deep.

The music video (directed by Steve Carr) takes place in an Opera House. Prodigy and Havoc take turns doing verses in different locations of the Opera House. The music video features a cameo appearance by Method Man.

== Track listing ==
=== Side A ===
1. "G.O.D. Pt. III" [Clean Version]
2. "G.O.D. Pt. III" [Instrumental]

=== Side B ===
1. "G.O.D. Pt. III" [Dirty Version] (4:07)
2. "G.O.D. Pt. III" [Acappella]

== Charts ==
Chart (1997)	Peak position
US Bubbling Under Hot 100 (Billboard)	1
US Dance Singles Sales (Billboard)	8
US Hot Rap Songs (Billboard)	18
US Hot R&B/Hip-Hop Singles Sales (Billboard)	44
US Hot R&B/Hip-Hop Songs (Billboard)	64
