= Front Lines (Hell on Earth) =

1996 single by Mobb Deep

Single by Mobb Deep

from the album Hell on Earth
- Released: October 4, 1996
- Recorded: 1996
- Genre: East Coast hip hop; hardcore hip hop; Gangsta rap
- Length: 4:34
- Label: Loud; RCA; BMG Records
- Songwriters: Havoc; Prodigy
- Producer: Mobb Deep

Mobb Deep singles chronology
"L.A., L.A." (1996)	"Front Lines (Hell on Earth)" (1996)	"It's the Pee" (1997)

"Front Lines (Hell on Earth)" is the official first single from Mobb Deep's Hell on Earth album, released in 1996. The song is listed on the album as "Hell on Earth (Front Lines)". The song samples "October Ballade" by Stanley Clarke, Chick Corea, Joe Henderson, Freddie Hubbard, and Lenny White.

The song is also included on the best of album Life of the Infamous: The Best of Mobb Deep.

Odd Future member Domo Genesis used the instrumental for his song "Benediction" from his 2011 mixtape Under the Influence.

Mc Circulaire (play on word with circular saw) used the instrumental for his song "Demain c'est trop tard" (tomorrow is too late) as a response to IAM's " Demain c'est loin" (tomorrow is far away) that ends the album "L'école du micro d'argent".

== Track listing ==
1. "Front Lines (Hell on Earth)" [LP Version]—(4:36)
2. "Front Lines (Hell on Earth)" [Instrumental]—(4:36)

== Charts ==
Chart (1996)	Peak position	Ref.
Billboard Hot R&B Singles	57	
Billboard Hot Rap Tracks	13	
Billboard Hot Dance Music/Maxi-Singles Sales	4	

== Certifications ==
Certifications for "Front Lines (Hell on Earth)"
Region	Certification	Certified units/sales
New Zealand (RMNZ)	Gold	15,000^{‡}
^{‡} Sales+streaming figures based on certification alone.
