= I Saw It Cummin' =

Single by PMD

from the album Shadē Business
- B-side: "Steppin' Thru Hardcore"
- Released: August 15, 1994
- Studio: Black Zone Studios (New York, NY); Northshore Soundworks (New York, NY)
- Genre: Hip-hop
- Length: 4:00
- Label: RCA
- Songwriters: Parrish Smith; George Spivey; Andrew Noland; Walter Morrison; Marshall E. Jones; Leroy Bonner; Ralph Middlebrooks
- Producers: PMD; DJ Scratch

PMD singles chronology
"I Saw It Cummin'" (1994)	"Swing Your Own Thing" (1994)

Music video
- "I Saw It Cummin'" on YouTube

"I Saw It Cummin'" is a hardcore hip-hop song by American rapper PMD. It was released in 1994 through PMD/RCA Records as the lead single from the rapper's debut solo studio album Shadē Business. Recording sessions took place at Black Zone Studios and Northshore Soundworks in New York. Production was handled by PMD himself together with DJ Scratch, who utilised a sample from Ohio Players' "Funky Worm".

The song debuted at number 89 on the Billboard Hot 100 in the United States, making it PMD's most successful single during his brief solo career, as well as his only entry on the chart.

== Background ==
"I Saw It Cummin'" is a diss song aimed at his former musical partner Erick Sermon. The duo disbanded EPMD in January 1993 due to tensions stemming from a late 1991 burglary of PMD's home in which Sermon was allegedly involved. The lyrics revolve around being a solo artist and the song itself marks PMD's debut solo single. Its chorus contains vocal sample cuts from Snoop Doggy Dogg's "Who Am I? (What's My Name?)" and Ice Cube's "No Vaseline".

== Track listing ==
No.	Title	Writer(s)	Producer(s)	Length
1.	"I Saw It Cummin'" (Album Version)	Parrish Smith; George Spivey; Andrew Noland; Walter Morrison; Marshall E. Jones; Leroy Bonner; Ralph Middlebrooks	PMD; DJ Scratch
2.	"I Saw It Cummin'" (Zone Mix)	Smith; Spivey; Noland; Morrison; Jones; Bonner; Middlebrooks	PMD; DJ Scratch
3.	"I Saw It Cummin'" (Back Alley Bozack Mix)	Smith; Spivey; Noland; Morrison; Jones; Bonner; Middlebrooks	PMD; DJ Scratch
4.	"I Saw It Cummin'" (Underground Funk Mix)	Smith; Spivey; Noland; Morrison; Jones; Bonner; Middlebrooks	PMD; DJ Scratch
5.	"Steppin' Thru Hardcore" (Album Version)	Smith	PMD
6.	"I Saw It Cummin'" (Instrumental)	Smith	PMD; DJ Scratch

== Personnel ==
- Parrish "PMD" Smith – vocals, producer, recording, mixing
- George "DJ Scratch" Spivey – producer (tracks: 1–4, 6), scratches (track 5)
- Charlie Marotta – recording, mixing, engineering (tracks: 2–4)
- Chris Charity – re-mixing (tracks: 2, 3)
- Derek Lynch – re-mixing (tracks: 2, 3)
- Peter Lewis – re-mixing (track 4)
- Gary Spector – photography

== Charts ==
Chart (1994)	Peak position
US Billboard Hot 100	89
US Hot R&B/Hip-Hop Songs (Billboard)	65
US Hot Rap Singles (Billboard)	12
US Hot Dance Music/Maxi-Singles Sales (Billboard)	22
