= Kismet (Adriana Evans album) =

Compilation album by Adriana Evans
- Released: April 4, 2005 (Japan, Europe)
- Recorded: 1997, 2003, 2004
- Genre: Neo soul; R&B; latin jazz; funk; Afro Cuban; hip hop
- Length: 59:38
- Label: Universal Music
- Producer: Jonathan "Dred" Scott; Adriana Evans

Adriana Evans chronology
Nomadic (2004)	Kismet (2005)	El Camino (2007)

Kismet is a compilation album by American neo soul/jazz artist Adriana Evans, released in April 2005 by Universal Records. The collection consists of hit songs from previous albums, alternate remixes as well as new songs.

The set features a remix of the popular single, "Remember the Love" from her album Nomadic and is also (the theme song for Logo's TV series, Noah's Arc.

== Track listing ==
No.	Title	Length
1.	"Love Is All Around" (Bass Mix)	3:28
2.	"Summertime"	3:39
3.	"River" (Honey for Oshun)	4:50
4.	"Cold As Ice" (Remix)	3:58
5.	"I Hear Music"	4:07
6.	"Remember the Love (Battle of the Beats Mix)" (theme song to Noah's Arc)	4:06
7.	"Reality"	4:22
8.	"Seein' Is Believing" (Remix)	4:20
9.	"Check the Vibe"	4:10
10.	"To Know You" (Soul Mix)	4:03
11.	"In Search of..."	3:49
12.	"Midnight in Bahia"	3:01
13.	"Kismet"	4:27
14.	"Set in Stone"	3:34
15.	"7 Days"	3:44

== Credits ==
- All tracks written by Adriana Evans and Jonathan "Dred" Scott.
- Producer – Jonathan Dred Scott
- Co-producer – Rastine Calhoun (tracks: 1, 7, 8, )
- Producer [Additional] – Adriana Evans (tracks: 1, 7, 8)

== Personnel ==
- Adriana Evans: All lead vocals, Background vocals
- Producer: Jonathan 'Dred' Scott
- Hakeem Williams: Piano
- Jay Frisco: Acoustic Guitar
- Sal Mendez: Bass Guitar
- Yohimba: Electric Guitar
- Darryl Crocks: Acoustic, Bass Guitar
- Joe Conrad: Electric Guitar
- Trevor Lawrence: Drums
- Greg Moore: Guitar
- Javier Espinosa: Guitar
- Michael Lazer: Mastered
- Preston Boebel [Additional] Mixer
- Vito Colapietro II [Additional] Mixer
- Charlie Beuter: Mixer
