= DJ Honda (album) =

h

Studio album by DJ Honda
- Released: July 1, 1995 (Japan); July 2, 1996 (worldwide)
- Studios: Power Play Studios (Long Island City, New York); Platinum Island Studios (New York, NY); Sony Music Studios (New York City); Yo Mama's House (Hollywood, CA)
- Genre: Hip-hop
- Length: 52:00 (Japan); 39:26 (worldwide)
- Labels: Sony; Relativity
- Producers: Peter Kang (exec.); Taka Ozeki (exec.); DJ Honda; DJ Aladdin (co.)

DJ Honda chronology
h (1995)	h II (1997)

Singles from h
- 1. "Out for the Cash" Released: July 23, 1996; 2. "Straight Talk From NY" Released: 1996

Professional ratings
Review scores
Source	Rating
AllMusic	2/5 stars
Detroit Free Press	3/4 stars

h is the debut self-titled album by Japanese producer DJ Honda. It was released on July 1, 1995, via Sony Records in Japan and on July 2, 1996, via Relativity Records worldwide. Audio production of the album was solely handled by DJ Honda, except for two tracks of its Japanese version co-produced with DJ Aladdin. It featured guest appearances from various hip-hop artists, including Afrika Bambaataa, Biz Markie, Common Sense, Def Jef, Donald D, Erick Sermon, Fat Joe, Gang Starr, Grand Puba, Kurtis Blow, Melle Mel, Prince Whipper Whip, Redman, Sadat X, Tha Alkaholiks and The Beatnuts among others.

The album peaked at number 90 on the US Billboard Top R&B/Hip-Hop Albums chart. As of 1996, the album had sold 46,000 copies in Japan.

== Track listing ==
1995 version
No.	Title	Producer(s)	Length
1.	"Dat's My Word" (featuring Redman)	DJ Honda	5:09
2.	"DJ Battle" (Round 1)	DJ Honda	1:25
3.	"Game of Death" (featuring Erick Sermon)	DJ Honda	3:53
4.	"Cold Blooded" (featuring Melle Mel)	DJ Honda; DJ Aladdin (co.)	4:15
5.	"What Did You Expected" (featuring Guru)	DJ Honda	4:39
6.	"Freestyle '95" (featuring Biz Markie)	DJ Honda	4:47
7.	"Zulu Shout Out" (featuring Afrika Bambaataa)	DJ Honda	1:30
8.	"Bread + Jerry" (featuring Volume 10)	DJ Honda	4:56
9.	"Earth Till It's Down" (featuring Naybahood Watch)	DJ Honda; DJ Aladdin (co.)	3:30
10.	"DJ Battle" (Round 3)	DJ Honda	1:27
11.	"What It Look Like" (featuring Def Jef)	DJ Honda	4:21
12.	"Out for the Cash (5 Deadly Venoms)" (featuring Common Sense, Fat Joe & The Beatnuts)	DJ Honda	5:43
13.	"Old School Jam" (featuring Donald D, Kurtis Blow & Prince Whipper Whip)	DJ Honda	6:44
Total length:			52:00

Notes

- Tracks 3, 4, 7, 9, 11 and 13 are exclusive to this Japanese release.

All music is composed by DJ Honda.

1996 version
No.	Title	Length
1.	"Intro"	0:26
2.	"DJ Battle"	1:25
3.	"What You Expected" (featuring Gang Starr)	4:19
4.	"Kill the Noize" (featuring Problemz)	4:05
5.	"Dat's My Word" (featuring Redman)	4:05
6.	"Straight Talk from NY" (featuring Grand Puba, Sadat X & Wakeem)	5:12
7.	"Intro"	0:55
8.	"Out for the Cash" (featuring Fat Joe, Problemz & The Beatnuts)	3:37
9.	"Interlude" (featuring Common Sense)	1:16
10.	"Biz Freestyle" (featuring Biz Markie)	4:46
11.	"Fuk Dat" (featuring Sean Black)	3:03
12.	"International Anthem" (featuring Tha Alkaholiks)	3:32
13.	"The End" (featuring Al Tariq)	2:45
Total length:		39:26

1996 European version bonus tracks
No.	Title	Length
14.	"Out for Cash (5 Deadly Venoms)" (featuring Common Sense, Fat Joe & The Beatnuts)	5:43
15.	"What You Expected" (Instrumental)	4:58

Sample credits

- Track 3 contains elements from "Coldblooded" by The Bar-Kays (1974)
- Track 4 contains elements from "People Make the World Go Round" by The Stylistics (1971)
- Track 5 contains elements from "Where Am I?" by Redman (1995)
- Track 6 contains elements from "Love Don't Wait" by The Bar-Kays (1985)
- Track 10 contains elements from "Marcella's Dream" by The Crusaders (1978) and "Hihache" by Lafayette Afro Rock Band (1973)
- Track 11 contains elements from "Slipping Into Darkness" by The Ramsey Lewis Trio (1972) and "How Many MC's..." by Black Moon (1993)

== Personnel ==
- Katsuhiro Hōnda – main artist, producer, scratches
- Alphonso Henderson – co-producer ("Cold Blooded" and "Earth Till It's Down")
- Peter Kang – executive producer
- Taka Ozeki – executive producer
- Christopher Edward Martin – scratches ("What Did You Expected")
- Berntony Smalls – performer ("Out For The Cash (5 Deadly Venoms)", "The End" and "Out For The Cash")
- C. Bullock – performer ("Kill The Noize" and "Out For The Cash")
- Derrick Murphy – performer ("Straight Talk From NY")
- Dino Hawkins – performer ("Bread+Jerry")
- Donald Lamont – performer ("Old School Jam")
- Eric Brooks – performer ("International Anthem")
- Erick Sermon – performer ("Dame Of Death")
- James Robinson – performer ("International Anthem")
- James Whipper II – performer ("Old School Jam")
- Jeffery S. Fortson – performer ("What It Look Like")
- Jerry Tineo – performer ("Out For The Cash (5 Deadly Venoms)")
- Joseph Antonio Cartagena – performer ("Out For The Cash (5 Deadly Venoms)" and "Out For The Cash")
- Keith Edward Elam – performer ("What Did You Expected")
- Kurtis Walker – performer ("Old School Jam")
- Lance Taylor – performer ("Zulu Shout Out")
- Lester Fernandez – performer ("Out For The Cash (5 Deadly Venoms)")
- Lonnie Rashid Lynn Jr. – performer ("Out For The Cash (5 Deadly Venoms)" and "Interlude")
- Marcel Theo Hall – performer ("Freestyle '95/Biz Freestyle")
- Maxwell Dixon – performer ("Straight Talk From NY")
- Melvin Glover – performer ("Cold Blooded")
- Naybahood Watch – performer ("Earth Till It's Down")
- Reggie Noble – performer ("Dat's My Word")
- Rico Smith – performer ("International Anthem")
- Sean Black – performer ("Fuk Dat")
- Wakeem – performer ("Straight Talk From NY")
- Michael Sarsfield – mastering
- John Lawrence Byas – mixing (tracks: 1, 3, 5, 6, 12, 13 on 1995 version), engineering (tracks: 3, 5, 10 on 1996 version)
- Fred "40 To The Head" Frederickson – mixing (tracks: 7, 8, 11 on 1995 version), engineering (track 12 on 1996 version)
- Troy Staton – mixing (track 4 on 1995 version)
- Liz Mercado – engineering (tracks: 4, 7, 8, 9, 11, 13 on 1996 version)
- Dino Zervos – engineering (track 6 on 1996 version)
- Patrick Aquintey – design

== Charts ==
Chart (1996)	Peak position
US Top R&B/Hip-Hop Albums (Billboard)	90

== Release history ==
Region	Date	Label(s)
Japan	July 1, 1995	Sony Music Entertainment Japan
Japan	July 21, 1995	Sony Music Entertainment Japan
Europe & North America	July 2, 1996	Relativity Records
