= Dred Scott (rapper) =

American rapper

- Born: Jonathan Scott; 1972 (age 53–54)
- Origin: New York, New York
- Genres: R&B; soul; hip hop; jazz; reggae; funk
- Occupations: Rapper; songwriter; musician; music producer
- Instruments: Vocals; keyboards; guitar; drums; piano; drum machine
- Label: Tuff Break/A&M

Jonathan "Dred" Scott is an American hip-hop/soul rapper, songwriter and music producer. Scott, who originally started his career as a rap artist, was born to parents who were both professional actors/dancers who met while touring with various music productions. His mother was the first African-American female dancer to appear on The Ed Sullivan Show. Scott received some training in jazz as a child, but was excited enough by the hip-hop innovations of Run–D.M.C. to pursue a music career as a rap artist. His music blends jazz, funk, hip-hop, and soul; along with social consciousness and a sense of humor.

Dred Scott's debut album, Breakin' Combs on A&M Records, was released in 1994. The album achieved moderate success, thanks to the underground singles "Check the Vibe" and "Back in the Day", which featured R&B singer and future wife Adriana Evans. The pair met while in college, which led to Adriana's appearance on Scott's "Breakin' Combs".

In 1995, Scott and Evans wrote and recorded her pioneering self-titled debut album on Capitol Records released in 1997. The album featured Scott's hip-hop-centric production backing Evans' jazz-influenced vocals; combined with live instrumentation, it was a significant departure from the R&B of the day. Changes at Capitol landed Adriana and her debut record on RCA/Loud Records and it was officially released in 1997. The two have since collaborated on subsequent Evans' albums El Camino, Nomadic, Kismet and her most recent Walking with the Night.

== Discography ==
=== Albums ===
- Breakin' Combs (1994)

=== Singles ===
- "Nutin' Ta Lose", 1993
- "Check the Vibe", 1994
- "Back in the Day"/"Can't Hold It Back", 1994
- "Remember the Love Rap", 2005

=== Collaboration appearances ===
- DJ Deckstream

"Memory of Melodies" (featuring Dred Scott & Adriana Evans)

- Alphabet Soup

Layin' Low in the Cut (1995)
song "Music in my Head"

=== As producer ===
- Adriana Evans (1997)
- Nomadic (2004)
- Kismet (2005)
- El Camino (2007)
- Walking with the Night (2010)

=== Soundtracks ===
- Hoodlums (1997)

song "Lucky Dayz" performed by Adriana Evans

- Ride (1998)

song "Never Say Goodbye" performed by Adriana Evans (feat. Phife)
