= Underground Connection =

Studio album by PMD & DJ Honda
- Released: April 27, 2002
- Recorded: 2001–2002
- Genre: Hip-hop
- Length: 41:00
- Label: DJ Honda
- Producer: PMD (exec.); DJ Honda (also exec.)

PMD chronology
Bu$ine$$ i$ Bu$ine$$ (1996)	Underground Connection (2002)	The Awakening (2003)

DJ Honda chronology
h III (2001)	Underground Connection (2002)	Reason (Soundtrack) (2005)

Underground Connection is a collaborative studio album by American rapper PMD and Japanese producer DJ Honda. It was released on April 27, 2002 via DJ Honda Recordings, and is produced entirely by DJ Honda. The album features guest appearances from 275, Buttah, CB Mass, Devyn, Don Fu-Quan, J-Boogie and Rob Jackson.

== Track listing ==
1. "Underground Connect"
2. "Beginning To End" (Live)
3. "Beginning To End"
4. "Honda 1"
5. "Constant Elevation"
6. "Bruce"
7. "Who Could You Trust"
8. "EPMD" (Live)
9. "Look At U"
10. "Police"
11. "Rhyme 4 Me"
12. "Hip Hop Universal"
13. "Know What I Mean"
14. "How Many"
15. "Love Is Love"
16. "Banger"
17. "Rocksteady"
18. "Watch Me"
19. "New Joint"
20. "Underground Connect"
