= Breakin' Combs =

Studio album by Dred Scott
- Released: March 22, 1994
- Recorded: 1993, Red Zone Studios; West Lake Audio
- Genre: Jazz rap; neo-soul; R&B; alternative hip hop
- Length: 59:22
- Label: Tuff Break/A&M/PolyGram
- Producer: Jonathan "Dred" Scott

Dred Scott chronology
| Small Clubs Are Dead (1993) | Breakin' Combs (1994) |

Singles from Breakin' Combs
- 1. "Nutin Ta Lose"/"Duck Ya Head" Released: 1993; 2. "Check the Vibe" Released: 1994; 3. "Back in the Day"/"Can't Hold It Back" Released: 1994

Professional ratings
Review scores
| Source | Rating |
|---|---|
| AllMusic | 3/5 stars |
| RapReviews | 8/10 |
| The Source | 3/5 stars |

Breakin' Combs is the debut studio album by American rapper and musician Dred Scott, released on March 22, 1994, by Tuff Break/A&M Records. The album was written and produced by Scott, with a sound that's influenced in the genres of soul, hip hop, jazz and reggae music. R&B/soul singer Adriana Evans is featured on the single "Check the Vibe", and "Swingin' from the Tree". Breakin' Combs was reissued in Japan twice, in 2005 and 2009, and includes bonus tracks on both editions.

Breakin' Combs received a nomination for National Association of Independent Record Distributors' 1994 Indie Awards.

== Critical reception ==
Breakin' Combs received positive reviews from music critics. Minya Oh, in her review for The Source, highlighted the album's diversity in styles, but thought that the album's quality varied across different tracks. She commended the album's production for its "quality basslines, sharp drums and catchy choruses", but found the instrumentals uninspiring, as she believed Dred Scott excelled as a lyricist. Vincent Thomas of AllMusic disagreed, as he thought that "Scott was always a better producer than rapper". Calling the album "expertly produced", he added that Breakin' Combs failed to achieve mainstream success as it was released alongside numerous classic albums. Discussing the album in a retrospective review, Steve Juon of RapReviews wrote: "Dred Scott showed the perfect balance between having one foot firmly planted in history with the other stepping forward toward rap’s future".

== Track listing ==
| No. | Title | Writer(s) | Length |
|---|---|---|---|
| 1. | "Back in the Day" | Dred Scott | 4:43 |
| 2. | "Duck Ya Head" (featuring Da Grinch) | Dred Scott | 4:48 |
| 3. | "Can't Hold It Back" | Dred Scott | 4:23 |
| 4. | "Check the Vibe" (featuring Adriana Evans) | Adriana Evans, Dred Scott | 3:31 |
| 5. | "Dirty Old Man" | Dred Scott | 0:37 |
| 6. | "The Story" (featuring Big Domino) | Dred Scott | 3:44 |
| 7. | "To da Old School" | Percy Chapman, Dred Scott | 1:38 |
| 8. | "Funky Rhythms" | Percy Chapman, Dred Scott | 4:06 |
| 9. | "Swingin' from the Tree" (featuring Adriana Evans) | Dred Scott | 3:33 |
| 10. | "Intro" | Dred Scott | 0:40 |
| 11. | "Nutin' ta Lose" | Dred Scott | 5:01 |
| 12. | "Liar" (featuring Tracy McGreggor) | Dred Scott | 3:26 |
| 13. | "Rough E Nuff" | Dred Scott | 4:52 |
| 14. | "My Mind is Driftin'" | Dred Scott | 4:00 |
| 15. | "They Don't Know" | Big Domino, Dred Scott | 4:21 |
| 16. | "Frankie's Groove" | Dred Scott | 5:58 |

Japan bonus tracks (2005)
| No. | Title | Writer(s) | Length |
|---|---|---|---|
| 17. | "Remember the Love Rap" | Jonathan Dred Scott | 4:05 |
| 18. | "Candy Man" (featuring Adriana Evans) | Jonathan Dred Scott | 4:09 |
| 19. | "Encore for the Hardcore" (featuring Adriana Evans) | Dred Scott | 3:39 |
| 20. | "Back in the Day (Unreleased Remix)" | Dred Scott | 4:46 |

Japan Bonus Tracks (2009)
| No. | Title | Writer(s) | Length |
|---|---|---|---|
| 17. | "Remember the Love Rap" (featuring Adriana Evans) | Jonathan Scott, Adriana Evans | 4:05 |
| 18. | "Candy Man" (featuring Adriana Evans) | Jonathan Dred Scott | 4:09 |
| 19. | "Regina" | Jonathan Dred Scott | 3:48 |

Notes

- On the 2005 Japan deluxe edition, the bonus tracks is listed as, Track 1: "Remember the Love Rap" and Track 2: "Candy Man".

== Personnel ==
- Adrian Evans: Vocals [featuring] (Tracks 4, 9)
- Dred Scott: Lead vocals, Vocals
- Percy L. Chapman: Vocals (Track 7, 8)
- Danny Grissett: Keyboards (Track 16)
- Osama Alfifi: Bass (Tracks 9, 16)
- Rastine Calhoun: Saxophone (Tracks 1, 11, 16,), Flute (Tracks 2)
- Darryl 'JMD' Moore: Drums (Tracks 16)
- Big Domino: Backing vocals (Tracks 6, 15)
- Andrew Padgett: Vocals [Voice DJ] (Tracks 2, 6, 10)
- Shah Skills: Record Scratches (Track 1)

== Credits ==
- Executive producer – Evan "E-Man" Forster
- Producer and arranged By – Dred Scott
- Mixed by Eric Sarafin
- Mixed By [Assistant] – Bryan Davis, Husky*
- Mastered by Brian Gardner
- Recorded by Eric Sarafin (tracks: 2, 11), Greg "Mr. Sincere" Mull*
- Recorded By [Assistant] – Andrew Padgett (tracks: 1, 3 to 10, 12 to 16)
  Charlie "The Wonder Boy" Essers*, Kevin Wright (tracks: 1, 3 to 10, 12 to 16)
  Victor McCoy (tracks: 1, 3 to 10, 12 to 16)
