= Live Evil (song) =

Single by Flatlinerz

from the album U.S.A.
- B-side: "Rivaz of Red"
- Released: 1994
- Recorded: 1994
- Genre: Horrorcore
- Length: 3:51
- Label: Def Jam
- Songwriter(s): Redrum, Tempest, Gravedigger
- Producer(s): DR Period

Flatlinerz singles chronology
"Satanic Verses" (1994)	"Live Evil" (1994)

"Live Evil" is the second and final single released from the Flatlinerz' debut album, U.S.A. It was released in 1994 through Def Jam Recordings and was produced by DR Period. The song peaked at #35 on the Hot Rap Singles and #28 on the Hot Dance Music/Maxi-Singles Sales.

== Single track listing ==
=== A-Side ===
1. "Live Evil"- 3:50 (LP Version)
2. "Live Evil"- 3:51 (Radio Edit)
3. "Live Evil"- 3:14 (Acapella)

=== B-Side ===
1. "Live Evil"- 3:51 (Instrumental)
2. "Rivaz of Red"- 4:32 (LP Version)
3. "Rivaz of Red"- 4:33 (Instrumental)
