= Adriana Evans (album) =

Studio album by Adriana Evans
- Released: April 15, 1997
- Recorded: 1995–1997
- Genres: Neo soul; R&B; jazz; hip hop
- Length: 50:59
- Label: Loud / RCA
- Producers: Dred Scott, Adriana Evans

Adriana Evans chronology
| Adriana Evans (1997) | Nomadic (2004) |

Singles from Nomadic
- 1. "Love Is All Around" Released: 1997; 2. "Seein' Is Believing" Released: 1997

Professional ratings
Review scores
| Source | Rating |
|---|---|
| Allmusic | 3/5 stars |
| Muzik | 6/10 |
| USA Today | 3/4 stars |

Adriana Evans is the self-titled debut studio album by American neo soul artist Adriana Evans, released on April 15, 1997, through Loud Records.

All of the tracks on the album were written and produced by rapper Dred Scott and Evans. The album made it to two Billboard charts, doing fairly well on the Top R&B/Hip-Hop Albums and the Top Heatseekers, though it did not chart on the Billboard 200. Two singles also made it to the Billboard charts, "Love is All Around" peaking at #65 and "Seein' is Believing" at #50 on Billboards Top R&B Singles chart.

== Track listing ==
All tracks written by Adriana Evans and Johnathan "Dred" Scott

| No. | Title | Length |
|---|---|---|
| 1. | "Love Is All Around" | 3:48 |
| 2. | "Seein' Is Believing" | 4:09 |
| 3. | "Heaven" | 4:14 |
| 4. | "Reality" | 4:21 |
| 5. | "Hey Brother" | 4:00 |
| 6. | "Trippin'" | 4:06 |
| 7. | "I'll Be There" | 4:22 |
| 8. | "Love Me" | 3:45 |
| 9. | "Looking for Your Love" | 4:16 |
| 10. | "Swimming" | 4:16 |
| 11. | "Say You Won't" | 5:03 |
| 12. | "In The Sun" | 4:39 |

Japanese edition (bonus track)
| No. | Title | Length |
|---|---|---|
| 13. | "Reality" (Thayod Remix W/Rap) (featuring Xzibit and K-Borne) | 4:45 |

== Credits ==
- Producer – Jonathan "Dred" Scott
- Producer [Additional] – Adriana Evans (tracks: 1 to 4, 6, 7, 9, 11)
- Co-producer – Rastine Calhoun (tracks: 1 to 4, 6, 7, 9, 11)

== Personnel ==
- Duane Benjamin – trombone
- Gary Bias – baritone sax
- Kevin Brandon – bass
- Sekou Bunch – bass
- Bette Byers – viola
- Rastine Calhoun III – flute, arranger, conductor, tenor sax, producer, arp
- Mark Cargill – violin
- Susan Chatman – violin
- Andy Cleaves – trumpet, flugelhorn
- Luis Conte – percussion, conga
- Craig T. Cooper – guitar
- Evette Devereaux – violin
- Adriana Evans – vocals, producer
- Michael Allen Harrison – violin
- William Henderson – violin
- Herman Jackson – keyboards, fender rhodes
- Grant Lou – art direction, design
- Miguel Martinez – cello
- Eric McKain – percussion, tambourine, claves
- Myron McKinley – piano
- Wil Miller – trumpet, flugelhorn
- Joseph Mitchell – bells, orchestral bells
- Jorge Moragu – viola
- Patrick Morgan – violin
- Greg Mull – engineer
- Charles Owens – flute, oboe
- Eric Sanafin – mixing
- Harry Scorzo – violin
- Dred Scott – producer
- Jacqueline Suzuki – violin
- Robert L. Watt – French horn
- Jerome Webster – violin
- Gregory Williams – French horn
- Hershel Wise – viola

== Charts ==
| Chart (1997) | Peak position |
|---|---|
| US Top R&B/Hip-Hop Albums (Billboard) | 33 |
| UK R&B Albums (Official Charts) | 25 |
| US Top Heatseekers (Billboard) | 19 |

=== Singles ===
| Year | Single | Chart positions |
| Year | Single | US R&B |
|---|---|---|
| 1997 | "Love Is All Around" | 65 |
| 1997 | "Seein' Is Believing" | 50 |
