= U.S.A. (Flatlinerz album) =

Studio album by Flatlinerz
- Released: September 6, 1994
- Recorded: 1993–1994
- Studio: Chung King (New York, NY); Next Level (New York, NY); Greene St. (New York, NY)
- Genre: Horrorcore
- Length: 56:16
- Label: Def Jam
- Producer: Crush; DR Period; Kool Tee; Rockwilder; Tempest

Flatlinerz chronology
U.S.A. (1994)	Definitive Creepy Collection (2014)

Singles from U.S.A.
- 1. "Rivaz of Red" Released: July 12, 1994; 2. "Satanic Verses" Released: August 23, 1994; 3. "Live Evil" Released: 1994

U.S.A. (stands for "Under Satan's Authority") is the only studio album by American horrorcore trio Flatlinerz. It was released on September 6, 1994, via Def Jam Recordings. The recording sessions took place at Chung King Studios, Next Level Studios, and Greene St. Recording, in New York. The album was produced by Tempest, Rockwilder, Crush, DR Period, and Kool Tee, with Kenny Lee and Russell Simmons serving as executive producers. It features guest appearances from Gravemen, Kool Tee, Mayhem, Omen, Rockwilder, and the Headless Horsemen.

The album peaked at number 65 on the Top R&B/Hip-Hop Albums and number 24 on the Top Heatseekers and found controversy for its satanic themes. Also, the three music videos the group shot for the album, "Live Evil", "Satanic Verses" and "Rivaz of Red", were barely played because of things such as frontman Redrum rhyming while hanging from a noose and Gravedigger rhyming from a crucifix. The album only sold 36,000 copies and the group, along with the Headless Horsemen and Omen, was dropped from Def Jam. Three singles were released, but only "Live Evil" made it to the charts, making it to No. 35 on the Hot Rap Singles.

== Critical reception ==
Professional ratings
Review scores
Source	Rating
AllMusic	2/5 stars

The New York Times wrote that "the Flatlinerz use the slow-moving piano melodies and minor chords of horror-film soundtracks to drive their music, adding screeching birds and tolling church bells for spice."

In 2009, Fangoria named U.S.A. as an iconic horrorcore album.

== Track listing ==
No.	Title	Writer(s)	Producer(s)	Length
1.	"Intro"			2:27
2.	"Good Day to Die" (featuring Kool Tee, Omen, Mayhem and Gravemen)	Jamel Simmons; Darnell Cunningham; Juan Clarke; Tadone Wilson; Thomas McQueen	Kool Tee; Crush	5:10
3.	"Scary Us"	Simmons; Cunningham; Clarke; Wilson; McQueen	Kool Tee; Crush	3:43
4.	"Flatline"	Simmons; Cunningham; Clarke; Dana Stinson; Erick Sermon; Parrish Smith; Roger Troutman; David Gamson	Rockwilder; Tempest	4:18
5.	"Sonic Boom"	Simmons; Cunningham; Clarke; Stinson; Sue Ann Carwell; Phillip L. Stewart II; Tony Haynes	Rockwilder; Tempest	4:20
6.	"Brooklyn/Queens (Skit)"	Simmons; Cunningham; Clarke; Stinson	Rockwilder; Tempest	0:24
7.	"718"	Simmons; Cunningham; Clarke; Stinson; Keith Elam; Chris Martin	Rockwilder; Tempest	4:11
8.	"Run"	Simmons; Cunningham; Clarke; Wilson; McQueen	Kool Tee; Crush	3:25
9.	"Body n' a Blunt (Skit)"	Simmons; Cunningham; Clarke	Tempest	0:17
10.	"Whydyadoit (Skit)"	Simmons; Cunningham; Clarke; Stinson	Rockwilder; Tempest	1:00
11.	"Takin' Em Underground"	Simmons; Cunningham; Clarke; Stinson	Rockwilder; Tempest	4:56
12.	"Graveyard Nightmare" (featuring Rockwilder)	Simmons; Cunningham; Clarke; Stinson	Rockwilder; Tempest (co.)	4:08
13.	"One Armed Bandit (Skit)"	Simmons; Cunningham; Clarke	Tempest	0:55
14.	"Rivaz of Red"	Simmons; Cunningham; Clarke; Stinson; Reginald Noble; Rick James; Jesse Stone; Billy Jones; Sylvia Robinson	Rockwilder; Tempest	4:32
15.	"Satanic Verses" (featuring the Headless Horsemen)	Simmons; Cunningham; Clarke; J. Leroy; M. Gardner; Darryl Pittman	DR Period; Divine Campbell (co.)	4:23
16.	"War Zone"	Simmons; Cunningham; Clarke; Pittman	DR Period; Divine Campbell (co.)	3:15
17.	"Beware... (Satanic Verses Skit)"	Simmons; Cunningham; Clarke	Tempest	1:01
18.	"Live Evil"	Simmons; Cunningham; Clarke; Pittman	DR Period; Divine Campbell (co.)	3:51
Total length:				56:16

Sample credits

- Track 4 contains elements from "Crossover" by EPMD and "Party Groove (Instrumental)" by Showbiz and A.G.
- Track 5 samples the song "Seven Days, Seven Nights" by Sue Ann Carwell
- Track 7 contains a sample from "Step in the Arena" by Gang Starr
- Track 14 embodies portions of "Tonight's da Night" by Redman and "I'm Gonna Take Your Love" by Brother to Brother

== Personnel ==
- Jamel "Redrum" Simmons – main artist, vocals, sleeve notes
- Darnell "Gravedigger" Cunningham – main artist, vocals, sleeve notes
- Juan "Tempest" Clarke – main artist, vocals, producer, sleeve notes
- Tadone "Kool Tee" Hill – featured artist, producer
- Devon "Omen" Purkiss – featured artist
- Gravemen – featured artist
- Mayhem – featured artist
- Dana "Rockwilder" Stinson – featured artist, producer
- J. Leroy of the Headless Horsemen – featured artist
- M. Gardner of the Headless Horsemen – featured artist
- Nora T. – backing vocals
- Anthony "Trace Bass" Brown – bass
- Richard "Rich" Keller – bass, electric guitar, recording, mixing
- Darryl "DR Period" Pittman – keyboards, percussion, programming, producer, arranger
- Thomas "Crush" McQueen – producer
- Divine Campbell – co-producer, arranger
- Kenny Lee – executive producer
- Russell Simmons – executive producer
- Danny Clinch – photography
- John Blackford – illustration
- The Drawing Board – design

== Charts ==
Chart (1994)	Peak position
US Top R&B/Hip-Hop Albums (Billboard)	65
US Heatseekers Albums (Billboard)	24

=== Singles ===
Year	Song	Chart positions
Year	Song	US Rap
1994	"Live Evil"	35
1994	"Satanic Verses"	—
1994	"Rivaz of Red"	—
