= Yaggfu Front =

American hip hop group

- Also known as: Yaggfu; Y.A.G.G.F.U. Front
- Origin: Raleigh-Durham, North Carolina, United States
- Genres: Hip hop
- Years active: 1991–1995, 2002–present
- Labels: Mercury/PolyGram Records; Mends Records
- Members: Spin 4th (or Big Spin); D'Ranged & Damaged (or DND); Jingle Bel (or JB)
- Website: http://www.MySpace.com/Yaggfu https://twitter.com/YaggfuFRONT http://www.yaggfufront.com

Yaggfu Front is a hip hop group from North Carolina. Their group name is an acronym which stands for You Are Gonna Get Fucked Up (if you) Front. Band members are Spin 4th, D'Ranged & Damaged and Jingle Bel. Working as late night DJs at NCSU Radio Station WKNC, they landed a record deal with Mercury Records and released their first single, "Lookin’ For A Contract" in early 1993. In 1994, they released their first studio album, Action Packed Adventure, a concept album with jazz influences. The album received 3.5 mics out of 5 in the hip-hop magazine The Source in February 1994. The album was barely promoted and did not sell well, prompting the group to request that they be released from PolyGram Records. They disappeared until 2002, around which point some members of the group were working with the Demigodz. Around that time, they released The Secret Tapes, a compilation of material recorded during their most successful stint in the game, 1992 to 1995.

== Main albums ==
Album information
Action Packed Adventure!
- Released: March 6, 1994
- Singles: "Busted Loop", "Left Field", "Lookin' For A Contact"
The Secret Tapes (compilation album)
- Released: October 15, 2002
