= West Coast Bad Boyz: High fo Xmas =

Compilation album by Various artist as West Coast Bad Boyz
- Released: November 8, 1994
- Recorded: 1994
- Genre: Christmas music, gangsta rap, West Coast hip-hop
- Label: No Limit
- Producer: Al Eaton, E-A-Ski, CMT, Lil' Ric, Felton Piot, Larry Dee

No Limit compilation chronology
West Coast Bad Boyz 1 (1994)	High fo Xmas (1994)	Down South Hustlers (1995)

West Coast Bad Boyz: High fo Xmas is a compilation album by No Limit Records. It was released on November 8, 1994, and features hip-hop Christmas songs.

== Track listing ==
No.	Title	Length
1.	"High fo Xmas" (Master P, Silk, San Quinn, and JT the Bigga Figga)	5:13
2.	"Intro (Jail Cells)" (Pizzo Heaterman)	0:27
3.	"Lock Up fo Xmas" (King George)	4:48
4.	"Talk"	0:37
5.	"Jacking fo da Holidays" (Master P)	4:34
6.	"Chillin n da Game" (Mafiosos)	4:44
7.	"Ghetto Nite"	1:20
8.	"Christmas in da Ghetto" (Master P and C-Murder)	4:31
9.	"Hood Carols"	0:31
10.	"Rev Do Wrong X-mas Party" (Big Ed, Dangerous Dame, and Lil' Ric)	5:13
11.	"No Limit Party" (Master P)	5:09
