= Action Packed Adventure =

Action Packed Adventure! (OST)

Studio album by Yaggfu Front
- Released: 1994
- Recorded: 1992–1993
- Genre: Underground hip hop
- Length: 58:33
- Labels: Mercury; Polygram
- Producers: Yaggfu Front; New Vibe Messengers, Minnesota

Yaggfu Front chronology
Action Packed Adventure! (OST) (1994)	The Secret Tapes (2002)

Singles from Action Packed Adventure
- 1. "Lookin' for a Contract" Released: January 1993 (This song was left off the final album); 2. "Busted Loop" Released: September 1993; 3. "Left Field" Released: 1994

Action Packed Adventure!, also known as Action Packed Adventure! (Original Motion Picture Soundtrack), is the debut album by the rap group Yaggfu Front. It has been compared to the Pharcyde & Das EFX for its quirky and somewhat playful lyrics. The first single was "Left Field". The title track is about the group's efforts to obtain a recording contract.

== Critical reception ==
Professional ratings
Review scores
Source	Rating
AllMusic	4/5 stars
Robert Christgau	(choice cut)
The Source	3.5/5 stars

The Independent wrote: "The montage of found-sounds that separates the tracks—answerphone messages, fake announcements etc.—may be directly descended from De La Soul, but the vocal style here is less relaxed, more in the vein of speed-rappers like Das EFX. Fitting syllables to beats like complex jigsaw puzzles, their incessant rap style can ultimately be as wearing as their vocabulary is impressive." DJ Mighty Mi, in a review for The Source, praised the production of the album, highlighting the "true basslines and nicely-filtered loops", and commended the group for their "left-field lyrical approach".

== Track listing ==
#	Title	Time
1	"Fanfare & Previews"	3:25
2	"Where'd You Get Your Bo Bo's?"	4:05
3	"Trooper 101"	4:20
4	"Mr. Hook"	3:51
5	"Busted Loop"	4:17
6	"Fruitless-Moot"	3:20
7	"Black Liquid"	3:29
8	"Slappin' Suckas Silly" [LP Remix]	4:21
9	"Action Packed Adventure"	4:29
10	"Left Field"	4:00
11	"Hold 'Em Back (What's the Meaning?)"	3:54
12	"Uptown Downtown"	3:15
13	"Frontline"	5:27
14	"Sweet Caroline"	1:58
15	"My Dick Is So Large" (bonus track)	4:22
