= DJ Honda =

Japanese DJ and music producer

DJ Honda 本田勝裕
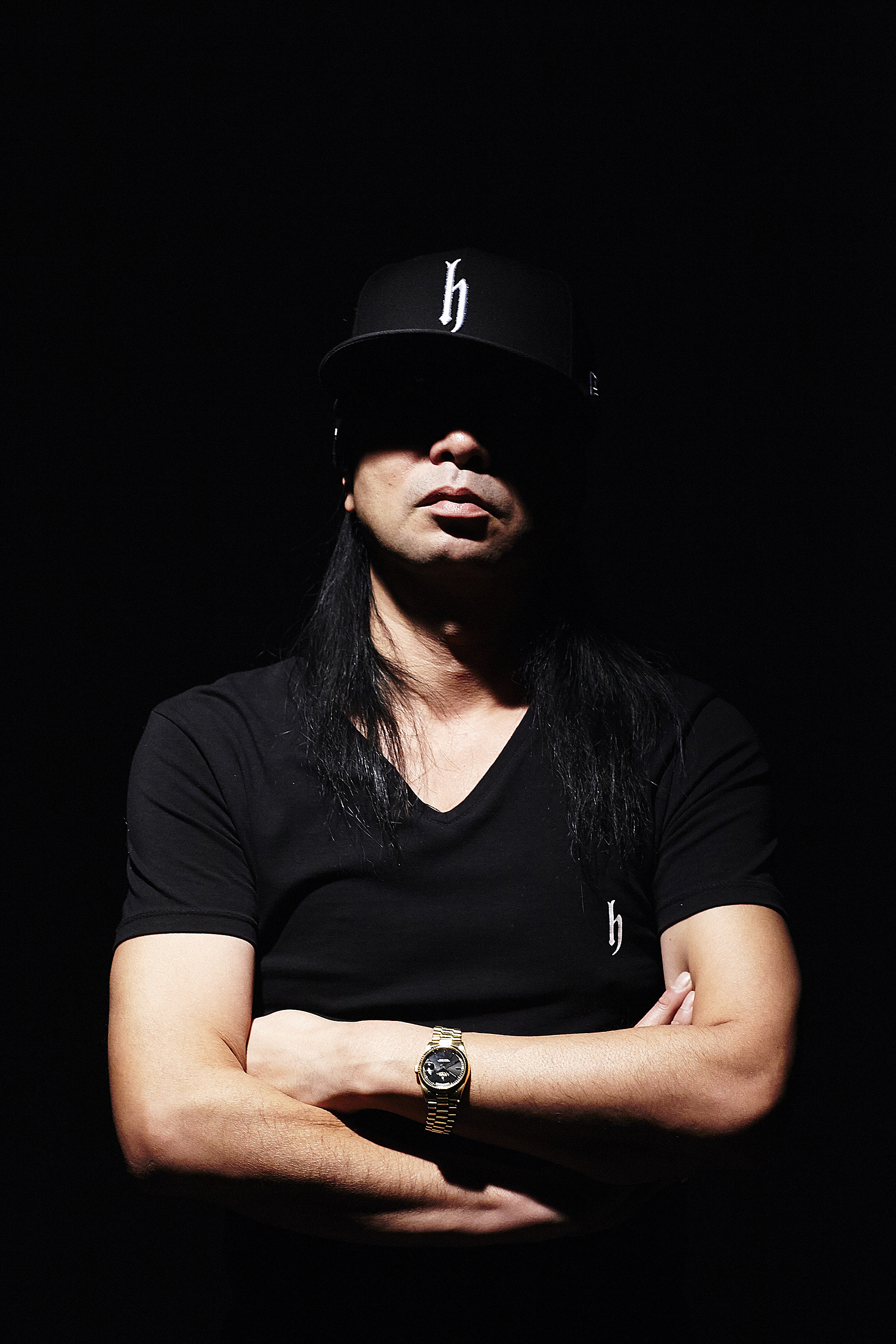
- DJ Honda in 2015

Background information
- Born: Katsuhiro Honda; 1965 (age 60–61); Hokkaidō, Japan
- Origin: Tokyo, Japan
- Genre: Hip-hop
- Occupations: DJ; record producer
- Instrument: Turntables
- Years active: 1992–present
- Labels: Sony Japan; Relativity; DJ Honda Recordings
- Website: djhonda.com

Katsuhiro Honda (本田勝裕, Honda Katsuhiro), better known as DJ Honda, is a Japanese record producer and DJ best known for his 1995 self-titled eponymous debut, DJ Honda (also shortened to h).

== Biography ==
DJ Honda moved to Tokyo at 17 years old to play in an American influenced rock band called 'The Clique' as the vocalist and guitarist. However, the band struggled and Honda was forced to seek additional employment.

He began DJing at the popular nightclubs in a small nearby city, Shizuoka where he was first introduced to hip-hop music and various turntable techniques, including scratching & beat juggling.

Eventually, Honda landed gigs in Tokyo's largest clubs while perfecting his turntable techniques. DJ Honda also appeared on Tokyo radio stations and remixed popular tracks for local record companies.

=== 1990s ===
After entering New York City's New Music Seminar's Battle for World Supremacy in 1992 and placing runner up, DJ Honda decided to move to Los Angeles to make a buzz for himself in the United States. It was here where DJ Honda forged notable contacts such as Ice-T, Eazy-E, Tha Alkaholiks, Xzibit & many other West Coast talents. Sony Music Japan then approached DJ Honda for a recording contract where he eventually released two albums: h, DJ Honda & h II.

After securing this new recording contract with Sony, DJ Honda launched his signature h, DJ Honda collection including "h" baseball caps, men's clothing, accessories such as sunglasses, neck ties, umbrellas, shoe line, wallets, etc.

Back in New York City, he cultivated many valuable relationships with artists like Melle Mel, Grandmaster Caz, Prince Whipper Whip, Universal Zulu Nation including Afrika Bambaataa as well as some of the emcees who would later be featured on his self-titled debut LP album, h, DJ Honda: Common, Redman, Gang Starr, Fat Joe, Biz Markie, Donald D, JuJu & Psycho Les of The Beatnuts, Brand Nubian's Grand Puba & Sadat X, and more.

Following the success of h, dj honda album released in U.S. and Japan Versions, Honda released his sophomore compilation, h II which featured acclaimed emcees such as Mos Def, KRS-One, The Beatnuts, Cuban Link, Keith Murray, De La Soul, Missin' Linx, & more.

"Trouble In the Water", the first single from h II featured De La Soul. The second single from h II was DJ Honda & Mos Def's collaboration, "Travellin' Man." Its music video was shot in various places around the world from Brazil to South Africa. dj honda toured the world after h, dj honda and then again after releasing h II.

=== 2000s ===
DJ Honda left Sony Music Japan to embark on opening his own, launching independent record label, "dj honda RECORDINGS" simultaneously in New York City and Tokyo with Seoul, South Korea branch office opening in 2002.

Honda released two albums on Christmas Day, 1999: h 2000, a compilation album featuring all production by Honda coupled with New York's prominent emcees and Turntablist Revolution: I.T.F. World DJ Compilation Album Vol. 1, a compilation of scratches & beat juggling tracks by turntablists from around the world.

The first official U.S. & international single, "El Presidente" with Jeru the Damaja was distributed by RED and the music video was in rotation on national TV stations such as B.E.T.'s Rap City, MTV2, and other local cable shows.

DJ Honda released his junior compilation album titled h III in Japan and Korean Versions only. He enlisted New York lyricists: M.O.P., Teflon, The Beatnuts, Gravediggaz, Jeru The Damaja, Parish "PMD" Smith of EPMD, Triple Seis, 8 Off Agallah, Black Attack along with Rob Jackson, DJ Alladin, and more.

He collaborated solo with one emcee on an album titled "Underground Connection" with Parish "PMD" Smith of the duo group EPMD. It was released in Japan and S. Korea with bonus tracks from Korean hip-hop artists, Erick Sermon and a few other emcees.

DJ Honda opened his U.S. flagship retail store in SoHo, New York City in June 2000 which sold music, his clothing and accessory collection, "h, DJ Honda", and held live DJ sessions, events and sake parties. Following the footsteps of the "h 272" Store in NYC, four satellite "h, DJ Honda" stores opened their doors in Seoul, South Korea.

With the rise of DJ Honda's popularity in South Korea, 2002 World Hip Hop Clan Festival organizers invited DJ Honda to perform live in front of over 10,000 fans. DJ Honda brought EPMD with him on this Korean tour. DJ Honda also performed at the subsequent 2003 World Hip Hop Clan Festival as well bringing Parish "PMD" Smith, Strong Island's K-Solo, & Headcrack, a NYC underground emcee.

In April 2004, DJ Honda launched "DHF Films" in New York City & Tokyo where he produces and distributes documentaries, DJ battle DVDs, Japanese hip-hop dance DVDs, & more. In June 2004, he released The Best of DJ Honda, a double CD with 81 tracks including all the tracks that DJ Honda had released worldwide. The Best of DJ Honda was licensed by Atoll/Warm Music in Paris, France.

In March 2009, DJ Honda & Problemz released All Killa/No Filla album (Japan Version) to pave the way for DJ Honda's, DJ Honda IV. Three singles have been released from this album: "Da Payback", "NY/NY", & "Give It Up". Problemz, a Brooklyn native, has worked with DJ Honda extensively since the debut album h, DJ Honda. On October 12, 2008, DJ Honda & Problemz performed live at the International Arts Festival in New Orleans, Louisiana alongside artists such as The Game, Tamia, Lloyd and more.

DJ Honda has been creating the soundtrack for QD3 Entertainment's documentary film, The MC: Why We Do It, Stuck: independent film starring Mena Suvari & Stephen Rea, Hip Hop Honey's DVD, Namco Bandai's videogame, The Fast and the Furious, as well as many MTV shows such as Rob & Big and Run's House.

=== 2010s ===
DJ Honda worked on several projects including h Mental Vol. 5 which is a collection of DJ Honda beats, DJ Honda V, and Reason, a biographical documentary film about DJ Honda's life & career in English and Japanese versions.

DJ Honda joined a famous trumpeter Terumasa Hino's project and drop album Unity -h factor-.

He continued to make beats and drop albums with Japanese artists such as B.I.G. JOE, 紅桜 operating mainly in Japan with Japanese artists.

== Discography ==
=== Studio albums ===
- h (1995: Japan/1996: U.S.)
- Remixes (1995)
- h II (1997: Japan/1998: U.S.)
- Turntablist Revolution: I.T.F. World DJ Championship Album Vol. 1 (1999)
- h 2000 (1999)
- h III (2001: Japan/2002: Korea)
- Underground Connection (2002)
- The Best of DJ Honda, Vol. 1 (2004)
- The Best of DJ Honda, Vol. 2 (2004)
- Samurai Sword (2005)
- DJ Honda Mix, Vol. 1: The Best of DJ Honda (2005) (iTunes exclusive)
- Reason (2005)
- All Killa / No Filla with Problemz of Missin' Linx (2009)
- h Mental (2009)
- h IV (2009)
- Unfinished Connection (2015)
- dark side (2019)
- Golden Age (2022)
- hV.2 (2026)

=== EPs ===
- Straight Talk from NY (1996)
- We Don't Play (2000)
- dark side ~prelude~ (2019)

=== Singles ===
- "Trouble in the Water" (1998)
- "Travellin' Man" (1998)
- "El Presidente" (2000)
- "Real to Me" (2001)
- "Reason Chapter 1" (2005)
- "Reason Chapter 2" (2005)
- "Da Payback" (2009)
- "NY/NY" (2009)
- "Give It Up" (2009)
- "Another Day" (2009)
- "Magnetic Arts" (2009)
- "Shine On" (2012)
- "I Need More" (2013)
- "All I Need Is Love" (2013)
- "It Ain't Over 'Til It's Over" (2014)
- "Low Key" (2014)
- "Still" (2017)
- "A Rapper Got Killed Again" (2019)
- "My Rap Weeps Gently" (2020)
- "昔愛した、、" (h beat Remix) (2020)
- "Slow Down Theory" (2022)
