= Nomadic (Adriana Evans album) =

Studio album by Adriana Evans
- Released: March 22, 2004; November 9, 2009 (Re-issue)
- Recorded: 2002, 2003
- Studio: Hyde Street Studios (San Francisco, California); Clear Lake Studios, (Burbank, California)
- Genre: R&B; rock; funk; soul; reggae; samba; jazz
- Length: 44:08
- Label: Next Thing; Animatedcartun
- Producer: Jonathan 'Dred' Scott

Adriana Evans chronology
Adriana Evans (1997)	Nomadic (2004)	Kismet (2005)

Singles from Nomadic
- 1. "7 Days" Released: March 2004; 2. "Remember the Love" Released: 2005

Nomadic is the second studio album by American neo soul singer Adriana Evans, released in March 2004 on the independent label Next Thing. The album featured two singles, "Remember the Love" and "7 Days". Nomadic was re-issued in 2009 with enhanced media ("7 Days" music video). The lead single, "Remember the Love", was used as the theme song for Logo's TV series, Noah's Arc and is featured on its soundtrack album.

== Track listing ==
All tracks written by Adriana Evans and Johnathan "Dred" Scott

No.	Title	Length
1.	"Intro: Walk into the Sun"	1:01
2.	"Remember the Love" (Samba Soul Mix)	4:14
3.	"Cold As Ice"	3:43
4.	"In Search of..."	3:51
5.	"What It Is"	4:15
6.	"Something"	4:01
7.	"I Had a Dream"	3:41
8.	"Midnight in Bahia"	3:03
9.	"7 Days"	3:48
10.	"Morning Light"	2:04
11.	"I Hear Music"	4:09
12.	"Rollin' On"	4:23
13.	"Former Self"	3:55
14.	"7 Days" (Enhanced music video)

== Notes ==
- The music and artwork for this re-issue is identical to the 2004 release except for the CDs enhanced portion containing a music video for the song, "7 Days".

== Personnel ==
- Adriana Evans: Lead vocals, Background vocals
- Producer: Jonathan Scott
- Hakeem Williams: Piano (Track 1)
- Jay Frisco: Acoustic Guitar (Track 4)
- Sal Mendez: Bass Guitar (Track 1)
- Yohimba: Electric Guitar (Track 4)
- Darryl Crocks: Acoustic, Bass Guitar (Tracks 3, 12, 13)
- Joe Conrad: Electric Guitar (Track 5)
- Trevor Lawrence: Drums (Track 7)
- Greg Moore: Guitar
- Javier Espinosa: Guitar (Track 7)
- Michael Lazer: Mastered
- Preston Boebel [Additional] Mixer
- Vito Colapietro II [Additional] Mixer (Track 2)
- Charlie Beuter: Mixer

== Credits ==
- Producer – Jonathan "Dred" Scott*
- Co-producer – Adriana Evans
- All tracks written by – Adriana Evans and Jonathan Dred Scott
