= Flatlinerz =

American horrorcore group

- Origin: Brooklyn, New York City, U.S.
- Genres: Horrorcore
- Years active: 1992–1995, 2014–present
- Label: Def Jam
- Members: Tempest; Gravedigger; Redrum
- Website: horrorcore.net

Flatlinerz is a horrorcore group from New York City. They are responsible for introducing the term "horrorcore" with their 1994 release U.S.A. (Under Satan's Authority).

== Biography ==
The group is Redrum (Jamel Simmons, son of Danny Simmons, nephew of Russell Simmons and Rev Run) and two other emcees: Gravedigger and Tempest. FLM was an extension of the Flatlinerz (Flatline Massive) which included artists Butter, Mayhem, and OMN999 (Omen).

Def Jam targeted the Flatlinerz as an alternative to gangsta rap, which was dominating hip hop music at that time. The term "horrorcore" is a fusion of hardcore hip hop and horror.

The video for "Live Evil" featured Redrum rhyming while hanging from a noose. The second and last video ("Satanic Verses"), features Tempest eating guts from a body, Redrum restrained with rats crawling on him, and Gravedigger rhyming on a crucifix.

In June 2014, The Flatlinerz announced via Facebook, that it reformed and are working on a new project. In September 2014 it was announced that a 20th-anniversary release of U.S.A. The Definitive Creepy Collection which included new and lost tracks from the Flatlinerz.

On October 27, 2014, The Flatlinerz performed its first live performance in 20 years at Twiztid's Fright Fest show at the Town Ballroom in Buffalo, NY with Kamp Crystal Lake and Kung Fu Vampire.

On June 6, 2016, The Flatlinerz released the first of a three part EP trilogy set titled "6ix: Chapter 1" via its web site through the group's own newly formed independent label Horror House Entertainment. The album is a ten track EP of all brand-new Flatlinerz music.

On June 6, 2017, The Flatlinerz released the second installment of the 6ix trilogy titled "66ix: Chapter 2" on Horror House Entertainment. The EP has 7 brand new tracks and a bonus remix track of "Down Here" from Chapter 1. The first single off the album was "Da Linerz Iz Attackin" produced by Rockwilder.

On June 6, 2018, The Flatlinerz released the final installment of the 6ix trilogy titled "666ix: Chapter 3" on Horror House Entertainment. The EP has 10 brand new tracks completing the 6ix saga. The first single off the album was the controversial "Gucci's Different".

== Discography ==
Studio albums

- U.S.A. (1994)
