= Expansion Records =

British record label

- Founded: 1984
- Distributor: Essential Music
- Genre: Soul & Various Black Music
- Country of origin: United Kingdom
- Official website: Expansion Records.com

Expansion Records is a British record label founded by Northern Soul DJ Richard Searling and Soul Bowl owner John Anderson. In 1989, DJ, author, and journalist Ralph Tee joined the label, and both he and Searling have been running Expansion Records.

== Label history ==
In 1986, Expansion released its first twelve-inch record with the catalogue ref: EXPAND1 (in 1986) – "Love Me Anyway" by US band WQBC (via a distribution deal with PRT).

In 2004, Graphic Designer & DJ Simon Strutt rebranded the Expansion Records identity and created the 'e' logo to brand stamp each music release.

In 2010, Expansion released EXPAND100 ("Weatherman" by Adriana Evans).

At various times in its 25-year history artists that have signed to Expansion have included Leon Ware, Stephanie Mills, Leroy Hutson, Angie Stone, Gwen McCrae, Howard Hewett, Keni Burke, Lenny Williams, Rick James, Ronnie McNeir, and Evelyn 'Champagne' King, Maysa.

== Current/former artists ==
- Adriana Evans
- Dira
- Frank McComb
- Leon Ware
- Maysa Leak
- Stephanie Mills
- Keni Burke
- David Lasley
- Lenny Williams
- Helen Baylor
- Cool Million
- Angie Stone
- Howard Hewett
- Jean Carne
- Ronnie McNeir
- Leroy Hutson
- Trina Broussard
- Evelyn 'Champagne' King
- Rick James
- Peggi Blu
- Jabari Grover
- Kim Tibbs
- Gary Taylor
- Brit Funk Association

== 12" Discography ==
- EXPAND 1 WQBC: Love Me Anyway
- EXPAND 2 ANDREW BARRAX: Just Can't Seem To Forget
- EXPAND 3 LEO’S SUNSHIPP: Give Me The Sunshine
- EXPAND 4 CHAS: For Your Love
- EXPAND 5 CLARENCE MANN I'll Be Around
- EXPAND 6 RONNIE McNEIR: Follow Your Heart
- EXPAND 7 GENERAL CROOK: Mainsqueeze
- EXPAND 8 JAMES KING: Memory
- EXPAND 9 CURTIS REED: Exit 23
- EXPAND 10 LESLIE DRAYTON: Dreamer
- EXPAND 11 RONNIE MCNEIR: I'm So in Love With You Baby
- EXPAND 12 JAMES KING: Storyteller
- EXPAND 15 DUTCH ROBINSON: Low Down
- EXPAND 16 SNOW : Every Time You're Around
- EXPAND 17 RONNIE McNEIR: Searching
- EXPAND 18 GLAZE: Promises
- EXPAND 19 HELEN BAYLOR: There's No Greater Love
- EXPAND 20 HELEN BAYLOR: Oasis
- EXPAND 21 LEON WARE: Shoulda Been You
- EXPAND 22 AJA: Shine
- EXPAND 23 CALVIN BROOKS: My Favourite Thing
- EXPAND 24 LEROY HUTSON: Share Your Love
- EXPAND 25 CORNELL BROWN: 5 Minutes of Love Talk
- EXPAND 26 HELEN BAYLOR: Victory
- EXPAND 27 BILLY & SARAH GAINES: I Found Someone
- EXPAND 28 JOSIE JAMES: Win Your Love
- EXPAND 29 MATT COVINGTON: We Got One
- EXPAND 30 VERNESSA MITCHEL: Be For Real
- EXPAND 31 SOUL SAUCE SAMPLER
- EXPAND 32 JOSIE JAMES: Morning Glow
- EXPAND 33 CHRIS BALLIN: Stay Away From You
- EXPAND 34 FRESH AIR: Miss You
- EXPAND 35 LORENZO: Tic Toc
- EXPAND 36 GWEN McCRAE: I Can Only Think of You
- EXPAND 37 EL COCO: One Step Back For Love
- EXPAND 38 GARY TAYLOR: A.P.B.
- EXPAND 39 BILLY & SARAH GAINES: Love's The Key
- EXPAND 40 VICTOR HAYNES: Caught Up
- EXPAND 41 DENNIS AUSTIN: I'll Shine For You
- EXPAND 42 RICK WEBB: Think About It
- EXPAND 43 THE VALENTINE BROTHERS: This Kind of Love
- EXPAND 44 BILLY VALENTINE: Ja Miss Me
- EXPAND 45 SOUL SAUCE SAMPLER VOL.3
- EXPAND 46 JAMARIAH: Beverly
- EXPAND 47 INGRAM: My Sabrina Tequina
- EXPAND 48 KYMIZTRE: Come Share Your Love
- EXPAND 49 DAWKINS & DAWKINS: Miracle
- EXPAND 50 JOUS: Another Lonely Night
- EXPAND 51 VICTOR HAYNES: Don't Want Nobody Else
- EXPAND 52 GARY TAYLOR: Restless
- EXPAND 53 GARY: Rockin U Tonite
- EXPAND 54 SOUL SAUCE SAMPLER VOL.4
- EXPAND 55 HOWARD HEWETT: This Love Is Forever
- EXPAND 56 TRINA PERRY: I Can't Get Enough
- EXPAND 57 TERRY GARMON: Anyway
- EXPAND 58 EVELYN 'CHAMPAGNE' KING: I Think About You
- EXPAND 59 NICOLE JACKSON: I Like
- EXPAND 60 SOUL SAUCE SAMPLER VOL.5
- EXPAND 61 JIVE: Jive
- EXPAND 62 VOICES IN CONTROL E.P
- EXPAND 63 REBBIE JACKSON E.P.
- EXPAND 64 SYLVIA STRIPLIN
- EXPAND 65 RONDEY MANNSFIELD Call Me
- EXPAND 66 KENI BURKE I Need Your Love/Indigenous Love
- EXPAND 67 KASHIF: Good Ol' Days/Bed You Down
- EXPAND 68 PHILLIPPE: Listen To Me
- EXPAND 69 PATTERSON TWINS: I Need Your Love
- EXPAND 70 KUH LEDESMA: Dreaming
- EXPAND 71 LEW KIRTON: Heaven in the Afternoon
- EXPAND 72 HOLLOWAY: Everything You Do
- EXPAND 73 ROBBIE DANZIE (Love) Undeniable
- EXPAND 74 ATLANTIC STARR: You
- EXPAND 75 GERRY DeVEAUX Front of the Line
- EXPAND 76 JIMMY COBB So Nobody Else Can Hear
- EXPAND 77 LENNY WILLIAMS Gotta Lotta Luv
- EXPAND 78 MAYSA LEAK The Bottle
- EXPAND 79 WIZDOM I'm So in Love With You/DeBOUSE Every Fellas Girl
- EXPAND 80 ANDRE DE LANG Could You Be My Favourite Girl
- EXPAND 81 MYSTIC MERLIN Mr. Magician
- EXPAND 82 4 BELOW ZERO My Baby's Got E.S.P.
- EXPAND 83 RENE & ANGELA: Secret Rendezvous
- EXPAND 84 SHEREE BROWN: It's A Pleasure
- EXPAND 85 FREEDOM: Get Up & Dance
- EXPAND 86 KLOUD 9: On Kloud 9 EP
- EXPAND 87 MAYSA: Family Affair/The Bottle
- EXPAND 88 KLOUD 9 EP
- EXPAND 89 LONNIE HILL: Galveston Bay/Cold Winter in the Ghetto
- EXPAND 90 CARMEN RODGERS: The Way/Dream
- EXPAND 91 ALYSON WILLIAMS: Soft & Warm
- EXPAND 92 STEPHANIE MILLS: Born For This EP
- EXPAND 93 RICK JAMES Taste (Withdrawn)
- EXPAND 94 EVERYDAY PEOPLE EP
- EXPAND 95 HOPE COLLECTIVE: Give And Let Live
- EXPAND 96 STEPHANIE MILLS: Free (Master at Work remixes)
- EXPAND 97 DIPLOMATS OF SOUL: Someday
- EXPAND 98 MAYSA: Runnin' (Original/Reel People Remixes)
- EXPAND 99 KARL FRIERSON: Ten Minutes/Tall Green Grass
- EXPAND 100 ADRIANA EVANS: Weatherman/Surrender
