= Business Is Business (PMD album) =

Studio album by PMD
- Released: October 22, 1996
- Recorded: 1995–1996
- Genre: Hip-hop
- Label: Relativity
- Producer: PMD (exec.); Agallah; Charlie Marotta; DJ Scratch; Fabian Hamilton; Solid Scheme

PMD chronology
Shade Business (1994)	Business Is Business (1996)	Underground Connections (2002)

Singles from Business is Business
- 1. "Rugged-n-Raw" Released: September 10, 1996; 2. "It's the Pee" Released: April 8, 1997

Professional ratings
Review scores
Source	Rating
AllMusic	4.5/5 stars
Muzik	6/10
RapReviews	2/10
The Source	2.5/5 stars

Business Is Business (stylized as Bu$ine$$ I$ Bu$ine$$) is the second solo studio album by the American rapper PMD. It was released on October 22, 1996, through Relativity Records. The production was handled by Agallah, Charlie Marotta, DJ Scratch, Solid Scheme and Fabian Hamilton with PMD serving as executive producer. It features guest appearances from Das EFX, M.O.P. and Nocturnal.

The album debuted at number 180 on the Billboard 200 and number 29 on the Top R&B/Hip-Hop Albums.

Two singles were released from the album, "Rugged-n-Raw" featuring Das EFX, and "It's the Pee" featuring Mobb Deep. Both were minor hits on the R&B and Rap charts.

== Track listing ==
No.	Title	Writer(s)	Producer(s)	Length
1.	"Intro"			1:16
2.	"Business Is Business"	Parrish J. Smith; Angel Aguilar	8-Off	4:05
3.	"Leave Your Style Cramped"	Smith; Charlie Marotta	Charlie Marotta	1:56
4.	"Rugged-n-Raw"	Smith; Aguilar	8-Off	4:06
5.	"What Cha Gonna Do" (featuring Das EFX)	Smith; Andre Weston; William Hines; Chris Charity; Derek Lynch	Solid Scheme	3:38
6.	"Never Watered Down" (featuring Nocturnal)	Smith; Yasin Muhammedi; Aguilar	8-Off	4:16
7.	"It's the Pee"	Smith; Charity; Lynch	Solid Scheme	4:26
8.	"Kool Kat"	Smith; Marotta	Charlie Marotta	4:38
9.	"Interlude"			1:10
10.	"It’s the Ones" (featuring M.O.P.)	Smith; Jamal Grinnage; Eric Murray; Fabian Hamilton	Fabian Hamilton	3:26
11.	"Nuttin' Move" (featuring Das EFX)	Smith; Weston; Hines; George Spivey	DJ Scratch	4:15
12.	"I’m a B-Boy"	Smith; Spivey	DJ Scratch	3:54
13.	"Rugged-n-Raw (Remix)" (featuring Das EFX)	Smith; Weston; Hines; Aguilar	8-Off

== Charts ==
Chart (1996)	Peak position
US Billboard 200	180
US Top R&B Albums (Billboard)	29
