= Adriana Evans =

American R&B and soul singer-songwriter

- Also known as: Adriana Madera
- Born: Adriana Evans; 1974 (age 51–52); San Francisco, California, United States
- Origin: Los Angeles, California, United States
- Genres: R&B; hip hop; soul; funk; jazz; Afro-Cuban jazz; Latin jazz; rock
- Occupations: Musician; songwriter; producer
- Instruments: Vocals; scatting
- Years active: 1986–present
- Labels: Loud; Universal Music; Next Thing; Expansion; Guerilla
- Website: adrianaevans.com

Adriana Evans (also known as Adriana Madera; born 1974) is an American R&B and soul singer-songwriter. She was born in San Francisco, the daughter of jazz singer Mary Stallings. Her debut album, entitled Adriana Evans, was released in 1997 and peaked at #33 on the Billboard Top R&B/Hip-Hop Albums chart.

== Music career ==
Paul Stewart, CEO of PMP records, played a crucial role in helping Adriana Evans get a deal with Capitol Records during the 1990s. Stewart was attracted to Evans after hearing a demo featuring her and having seen her in the video for Scott's "Check the Vibe." As Capitol Records folded, Stewart brought Evans onto his PMP Records where she released her self-titled debut album.

Adriana's self-titled debut album featured two singles, "Love Is All Around" and "Seein' Is Believing." The two singles charted, with the former reaching #65 on the R&B charts and the latter reaching #50.

After the release of her debut record, Adriana became disillusioned with the music industry, took refuge in Brazil, and didn't record a follow-up until 2004's Nomadic, an album that explored various genres, held together by a theme of what she described as "African music." The next year she released Kismet (a compilation album). In 2007 Evans released El Camino, an album that, more than her previous records, was influenced by her stay in Brazil. Evans' fifth LP, Walking with the Night, was released in 2010; "Weatherman" was the album's first single.

=== Noah's Arc ===
Adriana recorded new songs for the soundtrack to Logo TV's hit television series Noah's Arc. The song Remember Love was used both seasons in 2005 and 2006 as the opening theme. Songs from her 2004 album Nomadic and 2007's El Camino also appears on the soundtrack.

== Discography ==
=== Albums ===
- Adriana Evans (1997)
- Nomadic (2004)
- Kismet (2005)
- El Camino (2007)
- Walking with the Night (2010)

=== Singles ===
- "Reality" (1995)
- "Love Is All Around", 1997
- "Seein' Is Believing", 1997
- "Remember the Love", 2004
- "7 Days", 2004
- "Hey Now", 2006
- "All for Love", 2007
- "Before You", 2007
- "Weatherman", 2010
- "Suddenly", 2010

=== Soundtracks ===
- Hoodlum (1997)
- Ride (1998)
- Noah's Arc: season 1 & 2 TV series (2006)
- Noah's Arc: Jumping the Broom (2008)

=== Collaboration appearances ===
- Dred Scott – Breaking Combs (1994)

songs – lead vocals performed on "Check the Vibe", "Swingin' from the Tree"

- Dred Scott – Small Clubs Are Dead (1995)
- DJ Deckstream – Soundtracks (2007)

song – lead vocals performed on "Memory of Melodies"
(written by Adriana Evans, Dred Scott, DJ Deckstream)
