= Horrorcore =

Subgenre of hip hop

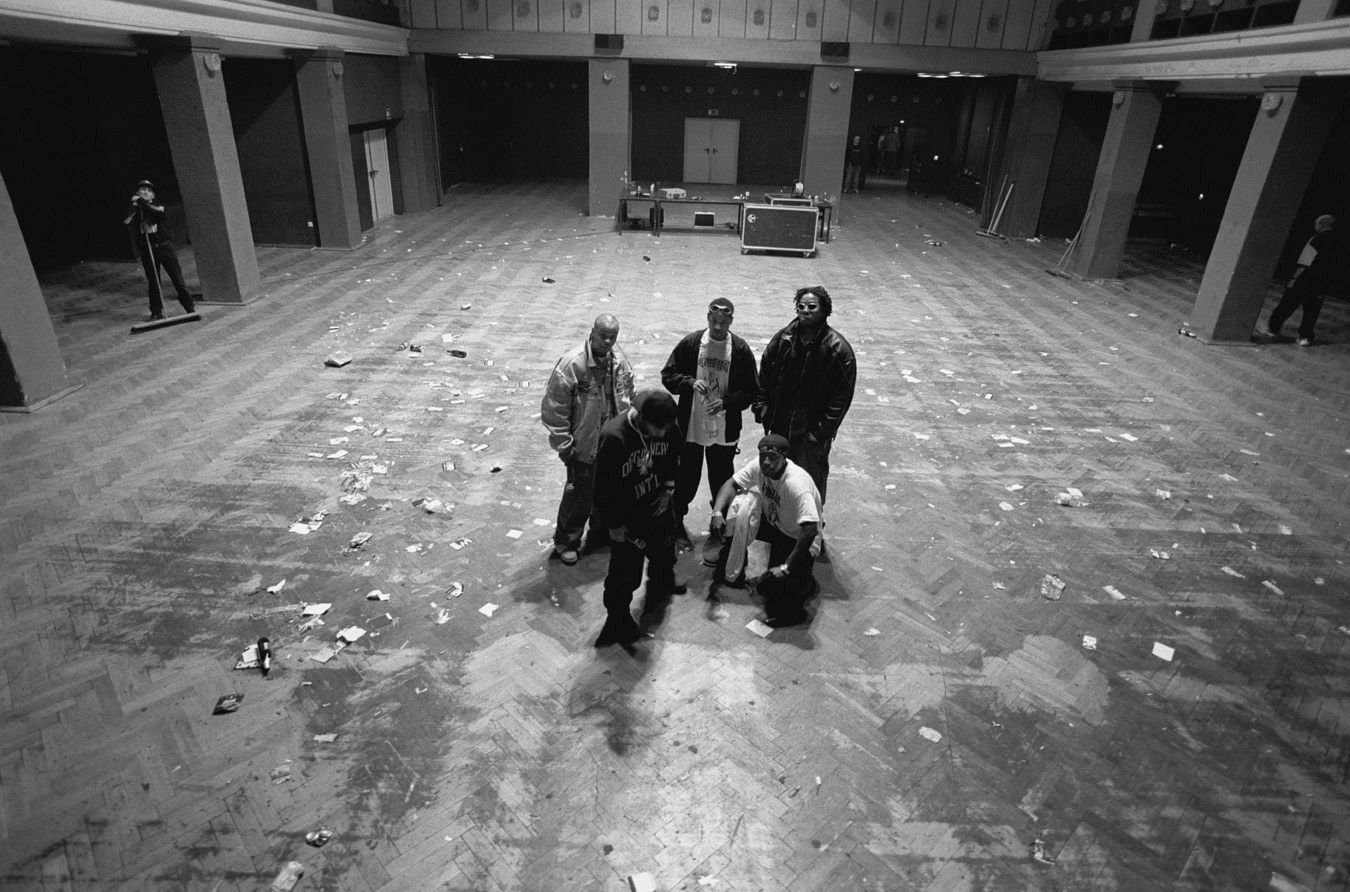
- Gravediggaz, a pioneering horrorcore group, whose violent, horror-themed lyrics have been considered key to giving the subgenre its identity and shape.
- Other names: Shock rap; horror hip-hop; horror rap; death hip-hop; death rap; murder rap; psycho rap
- Stylistic origins: Shock rock; horror fiction; shock value; hardcore hip-hop; gangsta rap
- Cultural origins: Early-mid 1980s, United States

Local scenes
- Detroit; Houston; Memphis

Other topics
- Horror punk; death metal; deathrock; rap metal; psychobilly; witch house; juggalo

Horrorcore (also known as shock rap, psycho rap, horror hip-hop, horror rap, death hip-hop, death rap, or murder rap) is a subgenre of hip-hop based on horror-themed and often darkly transgressive lyrical content and imagery. Its origins derived from certain hardcore hip-hop and gangsta rap artists, such as the Geto Boys, who began to incorporate supernatural, the occult, and psychological horror themes into their lyrics. Other early originators and influences on the genre include Eminem, Gravediggaz, Flatlinerz, Insane Clown Posse, Esham, Brotha Lynch Hung, Ganksta N.I.P, Kool Keith, Insane Poetry, sKitz Kraven, and Tech N9ne.

Unlike most hardcore hip-hop and gangster rap artists, horrorcore artists often push the violent content and imagery in their lyrics beyond the realm of realistic urban violence, to the point where the violent lyrics become gruesome, ghoulish, unsettling, or inspired by slasher films or splatter films. While exaggerated violence and the supernatural are common in horrorcore, the genre also frequently presents more realistic yet still disturbing portrayals of mental illness and drug abuse. Some horrorcore artists eschew supernatural themes or exaggerated violence in favor of more subtle and dark psychological horror imagery and lyrics.

Horrorcore has incited controversy, with some members of the law enforcement community asserting that the genre incites crime. Fans and artists have been blamed for numerous high-profile instances of violent criminal activity, including the Columbine High School massacre, the Farmville murders, murders of law enforcement officers, and gang activity.

== Characteristics ==
Horrorcore defines a style of hip-hop music that focuses primarily on dark, violent, gothic, transgressive, macabre and/or horror-influenced topics such as death, psychosis, psychological horror, mental illness, satanism, self-harm, cannibalism, mutilation, suicide, murder, torture, drug abuse, and supernatural or occult themes. The lyrics are often inspired by horror movies and are performed over moody, hardcore beats. According to rapper Mars, "If you take Stephen King or Wes Craven and you throw them on a rap beat, that's who I am". Horrorcore was described by Entertainment Weekly in 1995 as a "blend of hardcore rap and bloodthirsty metal". The lyrical content of horrorcore is sometimes described as being similar to that of death metal, and some have referred to the genre as "death rap". Horrorcore artists often feature dark imagery in their music videos and base musical elements of songs upon horror film scores.

== History ==
=== Origins ===
LA Weekly listed Jimmy Spicer's 1980 single "Adventures of Super Rhyme" as the first example of "proto-horrorcore", due to a lengthy segment of the song in which Spicer recounts his experience of meeting Dracula. The group Dr. Jeckyll and Mr. Hyde specialized in horror-themed music. Dana Dane's song "Nightmares" related a frightening narrative.

Since 1986, Ganxsta N.I.P. has performed horror-themed lyrics that he has described as "Psycho Rap", but he was not commonly considered to be horrorcore until the term came into mainstream prominence. Ganxsta N.I.P. has written lyrics for other groups, including Geto Boys, who were also an influence on the early horrorcore sound.

In 1988, DJ Jazzy Jeff & The Fresh Prince released "A Nightmare on My Street", which described an encounter with Freddy Krueger, and the Fat Boys recorded the similarly themed "Are You Ready for Freddy" for the film A Nightmare on Elm Street 4: The Dream Master and its soundtrack. 1988 is also the year His Majesti (Shakespeare the One Man Riot and Drew Roc aka Insane Poetry) released "Armed & Dangerous", followed by their debut single "Twelve Strokes Till Midnight", one of the first examples of music specifically made to be horrorcore. The following year saw the release of Boomin' Words from Hell, the debut album of Detroit-based rapper Esham, who would become particularly influential on Midwest horrorcore (though he rejects the term, preferring "acid rap").

Although Kool Keith claimed to have "invented horrorcore", the first use of the term appeared on the group KMC's 1991 album Three Men With the Power of Ten. Nonetheless, Kool Keith brought significant attention to horror-influenced hip-hop with his lyrical content as a part of the Ultramagnetic MC's and his 1996 debut solo album, Dr. Octagonecologyst.

In 2024, writers at Complex described Nas' 1994, debut studio album, Illmatic, as "shocking, borderline horrorcore (before horrorcore was a genre)". The album showcased Nas's early-'90s style of rap and was credited with generating significant hype for the MC.

=== Rise in the hip-hop genre ===
The Geto Boys' debut album, Making Trouble, contained the dark and violent horror-influenced track "Assassins", which was cited by Violent J of the horrorcore group Insane Clown Posse in his book Behind the Paint as the first recorded horrorcore song. He writes that the Geto Boys continued to pioneer the style with their second release, Grip It! On That Other Level, with songs such as "Mind of a Lunatic" and "Trigga-Happy Nigga". The Geto Boys' 1991 album, We Can't Be Stopped, was also influential on the horrorcore genre and contained themes of paranoia, depression, and psychological horror, especially in the track "Chuckie", and "Mind Playing Tricks on Me".

While rappers in the underground scene continued to release horrorcore music, including Big L, Insane Poetry, and Insane Clown Posse, the mid-1990s brought an attempted mainstream crossover of the genre.

According to the book Icons of Hip Hop, horrorcore gained mainstream prominence in 1994 with the release of Flatlinerz' U.S.A. (Under Satan's Authority) and Gravediggaz' 6 Feet Deep (released overseas as Niggamortis). The Flatlinerz and Gravediggaz, along with the Geto Boys, Insane Clown Posse and Kool Keith, remain the most important artists in the development of horrorcore as a specific genre.

In 1995, an independent horror film called The Fear was released with a soundtrack consisting entirely of horrorcore songs, including Insane Clown Posse's biggest radio hit, "Dead Body Man" and a title track ("The Fear (Morty's Theme)") by Esham. 1995 also saw the release of Three 6 Mafia's debut album, Mystic Stylez, which touched on heavy drug use, ritualistic sex, mass murder, torture, and Luciferianism. Bone Thugs-N-Harmony's E. 1999 Eternal, released in the same year, contains tales of the occult throughout, specifically on songs such as "Mr. Ouija 2", "Mo' Murda", "East 1999", and "Da Introduction". Tension would soon rise between Bone Thugs and Three 6 over their presumed similarities in style and use of dark imagery.

In 2009, dark music-themed website Fangoria named Tech N9ne's 2001 album Anghellic as an iconic and influential album to the genre, the artist, and hip-hop as a whole.

Horrorcore is generally not popular with mainstream audiences, though in some cities, like Detroit, it is the dominant style of hip-hop, with Detroit-based performers such as Insane Clown Posse and Eminem, as well as Twiztid, having been commercially successful throughout the US. Horrorcore has thrived in Internet culture. Every Halloween since 2003, horrorcore artists worldwide have gotten together online and released a free compilation titled Devilz Nite. According to the January 2004 BBC documentary Underground USA, the subgenre "has a massive following across the US" and "is spreading to Europe". Rolling Stone in 2007 referred to it as a short-lived trend that generated "more shlock than shock".

=== Present-day horrorcore ===
In 2019, experimental trio clipping. released There Existed an Addiction to Blood, described as a "transmutation of horrorcore".

Horrorcore influence has embedded itself into other genres and artists as a way to expand on real world problems and how it effects the African American culture in its whole.

== Controversy ==
In September 1996, Joseph Edward "Bubba" Gallegos, an 18-year-old from Bayfield, Colorado, killed his roommates after ingesting methamphetamine and listening repeatedly to horrorcore rapper Brotha Lynch Hung's song "Locc 2 da Brain". Brotha Lynch Hung is considered a horrorcore pioneer and even created his own horrorcore sub-category called "Ripgut" which is known for even more graphic lyrics dealing with hardcore gore, torture, and cannibalism. After attempting to kill his ex-girlfriend and taking two other students hostage, Gallegos was in turn killed by police. Gallegos was said to be a massive fan of Brotha Lynch Hung and his minister suggested that the music played a role in the killings, although he provided no evidence to back up that claim. Similar claims have been made about other violent acts and music, although there is "wide disagreement among experts over what effect—if any—music with violent content has on listeners".

In 1999, horrorcore group Insane Clown Posse (ICP) was considered a potential influence on school shooters Eric Harris and Dylan Klebold. ICP responded that if the shooters had been "Juggalos" (fans of ICP), they would have "gotten the whole damn school". However, Brooks Brown, the best friend of Dylan Klebold and a friend of both the shooters, was a Juggalo and had introduced Klebold to Insane Clown Posse's music.

Some police departments in the United States claim that Juggalo gangs have been linked to violent crimes. Arizona Department of Public Safety Detective Michelle Vasey has expressed concern at what she describes as the Juggalos' high potential for violence, stating, "The weapons, they prefer, obviously, hatchets ... We've got battle-axes, we've got machetes, anything that can make the most violent, gruesome wound", and, "Some of the homicides we're seeing with these guys are pretty nasty, gruesome, disgusting homicides, where they don't care who's around, what's around, they're just out to kill anybody". A 2017 Denver Police Department guide claimed that even Juggalos who are not affiliated with a gang are prone to commit "murder, shootings, kidnapping, rape, necrophilia, cannibalism, assault, and arson", and that "such acts give a Juggalo a sense of pride and street credit amongst peers", although it acknowledged that the author had not "been able to find a significant source of collected data on the Juggalos" to substantiate those claims. Allegedly horrorcore-related criminal activity has, in rare cases, even included ad-hoc domestic terrorism, such as when a Juggalo-led terrorist cell calling itself the Black Snake Militia attempted to raid a National Guard armory in 2012.

== See also ==
- Halloween music
