= Shade Business =

Shadē Business

Studio album by PMD
- Released: September 27, 1994
- Recorded: 1993–94
- Studio: Blackzone; North Shore; Albany Projects; Mark 45 King; Ete Land Dungeon
- Genre: Rap
- Length: 51:23
- Label: RCA
- Producer: Charlie Marotta; DJ Scratch; Jesse West; PMD; the 45 King

PMD chronology
Business Never Personal (1992)	Shadē Business (1994)	Bu$ine$$ I$ Bu$ine$$ (1996)

Singles from Shade Business
- 1. "I Saw It Cummin'" Released: August 15, 1994; 2. "Swing Your Own Thing" Released: December 12, 1994

Shadē Business is the debut solo studio album by American rapper PMD, released on September 27, 1994. It was produced by PMD, DJ Scratch, Charlie Marotta, the 45 King, and Jesse West. It features guest appearances from 3rd Eye, Top Quality, Zone 7, and Das EFX. The album peaked at number 42 on the Billboard 200.

"Swing Your Own Thing" is the second single taken from album. It was not as successful as his previous single, only making it to 40 on the Billboard's Hot Rap Singles.

== Critical reception ==
Professional ratings
Review scores
Source	Rating
AllMusic	3/5 stars
RapReviews	3/10

Trouser Press noted that "Smith expends a lot of energy making the simple sound difficult, spewing wordy boasts and celebrity similes inna old-school style." The Spin Alternative Record Guide praised the production but missed the "chemistry" of EPMD. In 1999, Ego Trip's Book of Rap Lists considered Shadē Business to be the sixth most disappointing debut rap album.

== Track listing ==
Darkside
No.	Title	Writer(s)	Producer(s)	Length
1.	"Shade Business"	Parrish Smith; James Vanleer; Bobby Rush	PMD	3:44
2.	"In the Zone"	Smith	PMD	4:16
3.	"Steppin' Thru Hardcore"	Smith	PMD	3:40
4.	"Respect Mine"	Smith	PMD	4:24
5.	"Here They Cum" (featuring Das EFX)	Smith; Andre Weston; Willie Hines	PMD	3:29
6.	"Back to the Rap"	Smith	PMD; Charlie Marotta	3:13
7.	"I'll Wait" (featuring Zone 7)	Smith; R. Harris; L. Bass; Clarence Haskins	DJ Scratch	5:22

Zoneside
No.	Title	Writer(s)	Producer(s)	Length
8.	"I Saw It Cummin'"	Smith; George Spivey; Andrew Noland; Walter Morrison; Leroy Bonner; Marshall Jones; Ralph Middlebrooks	PMD; DJ Scratch	4:02
9.	"Swing Your Own Thing"	Smith	PMD	3:39
10.	"Fake Homeyz" (featuring Top Quality and 3rd Eye)	Smith; T. Robinson; Jesse Williams	PMD	3:36
11.	"Phuck It Up Scratch" (featuring Al B.)	Smith	PMD	2:47
12.	"Back Up or Get Smacked Up"	Smith	PMD	2:47
13.	"Thought I Lost My Spot"	Smith	The 45 King; PMD (co.)	4:04
14.	"No Shorts and No Sleep" (featuring Top Quality, 3rd Eye and Zone 7)	Smith; Robinson; Williams; Harris; Bass; S. Jones	Jesse West	5:07
Total length:				51:23

Bonusside
No.	Title	Length
15.	"Shadē Business" (The Beatnuts Remix)	3:52
16.	"I Saw It Cummin'" (Zone Mix)	4:00
17.	"I Saw It Cummin'" (Back Alley Bozack Mix)	3:46
18.	"I Saw It Cummin'" (Underground Funk Mix)	4:00
19.	"Swing Your Own Thing" (Izum Remix)	3:20
20.	"Many Often Wonder"	2:57

Sample credits

- Track 1 contains a sample from "I've Been Watching You" by Southside Movement
- Track 4 contains samples from "Miss Lady Brown" by the Chambers Brothers
- Track 7 contains samples from "I Got a Thang, You Got a Thang, Everybody Got a Thang" by Funkadelic
- Track 8 contains samples from "Funky Worm" by Ohio Players
- Track 9 contains samples from "Bounce, Rock, Skate, Roll, Part 1" performed by Vaughan Mason & Crew

Notes

- Track 11 is omitted in clean version.

== Personnel ==
- Parrish "PMD" Smith – main artist, producer (tracks: 1–6, 8–12), co-producer (track 13), recording & mixing (tracks: 1–6, 8–10)
- Andre "Krazy Drayz" Weston – featured artist (track 5)
- William "Skoob" Hines – featured artist (track 5)
- Zone 7 – featured artists (track: 7, 14)
- T. "Top Quality" Robinson – featured artist (tracks: 10, 14)
- Jesse "3rd Eye" Williams – featured artist (tracks: 10, 14), producer & recording (track 14)
- Al B. – featured artist (track 11)
- Charlie Marotta – producer (track 6), recording (tracks: 1–11), mixing (tracks: 1–5, 7–11)
- George "DJ Scratch" Spivey – scratches, producer (tracks: 7, 8), recording & mixing (tracks: 7, 11)
- Mark "The 45 King" James – producer & mixing (track 13)
- Norman G. Balla 'Kaotic' – mixing (track 13)
- Lyle Owerko – art direction, design
- Gary Spector – photography

== Charts ==
Chart (1994)	Peak position
US Billboard 200	65
