= PMD (rapper) =

American rapper (born 1968)

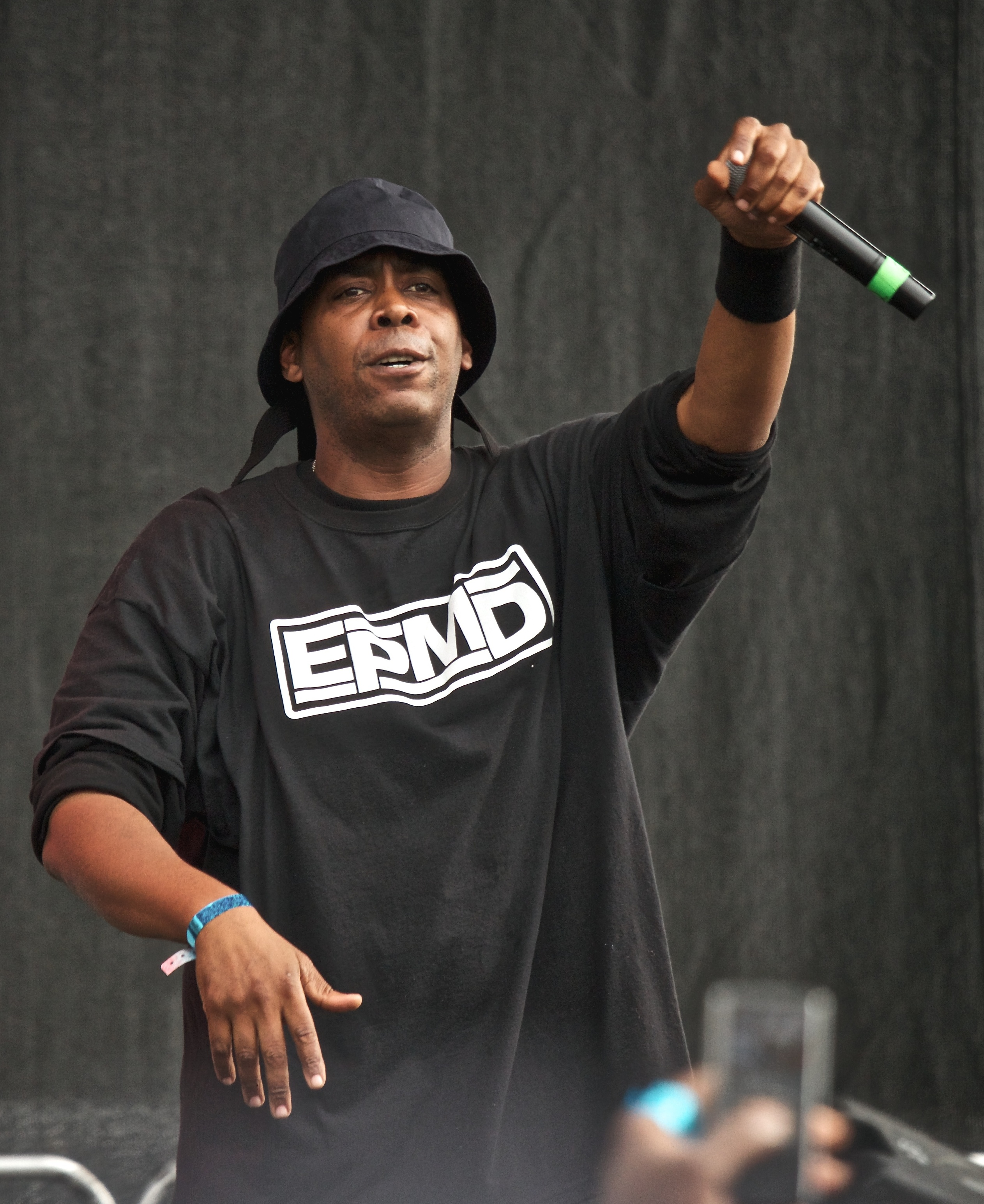
- PMD performing in 2013

Background information
- Born: Parrish J. Smith; May 13, 1968 (age 58); Brentwood, New York, U.S.
- Genre: East Coast hip-hop
- Occupations: Rapper; record producer
- Years active: 1987–present
- Labels: RCA; Relativity; Solid Records; RBC; Hit Squad
- Member of: EPMD; Hit Squad

Parrish J. Smith (born May 13, 1968), better known as PMD ('Parrish Mic Doc' or 'Parrish Making Dollars'), is an American rapper from Brentwood, New York, a member of EPMD and Hit Squad.

== Career ==
He attended Brentwood High School,, is an alumnus of Southern Connecticut State University, and has released four full-length solo albums, one extended play, seven EPMD albums with Erick Sermon, a collaborative album with Japanese hip-hop producer DJ Honda, and a collaborative project with Sean "Big Baby" Strange and German hip-hop group Snowgoons.

== Discography ==
=== Solo albums ===
List of studio albums, with selected chart positions
Title	Album details	Peak chart positions	
Title	Album details	US	US R&B/HH
Shade Business	Released: September 27, 1994; Label: RCA	65	12
Bu$ine$$ I$ Bu$ine$$	Released: October 22, 1996; Label: Relativity/Epic Records	180	29
The Awakening	Released: June 17, 2003; Label: Solid Records/Traffic Entertainment Group	—	—
Busine$$ Mentality	Released: September 29, 2017; Label: Goon MuSick/RBC	—	—
"—" denotes releases that did not chart, or was not released in that country.

=== EPs ===
List of extended plays
Title	Album details
New Business (From My Hood to Your Hood)	Released: September 13, 2013; Label: RBC Records

=== Collaborative albums ===
List of collaborative studio albums
Title	Album details
Underground Connection (with DJ Honda)	Released: 2002; Label: DJ Honda Recordings
Welcome to the Goondox (with Snowgoons & Sean Strange)	Released: April 9, 2013; Label: Goon MuSick

=== Charted singles ===
Year	Single	Chart positions			Album
Year	Single	US	US R&B	US Rap	Album
1994	"I Saw It Cummin'"	89	65	12	Shade Business
1994	"Swing Your Own Thing"	—	—	40	Shade Business
1996	"Rugged-n-Raw" (featuring Das EFX)	—	89	19	Business Is Business
1997	"It's the Pee" (featuring Mobb Deep)	—	82	31	Business Is Business
