= Cormega discography =

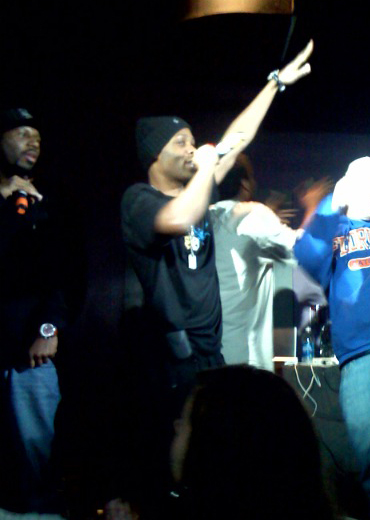
- Cormega performing in 2008
- Studio albums: 5
- EPs: 1
- Soundtrack albums: 1
- Compilation albums: 2
- Singles: 11
- Collaboration albums: 1

The discography of American rapper Cormega, consists of eight studio albums, two compilation albums, one extended play, and 11 singles.

In 1996, Cormega was featured on the Nas song "Affirmative Action" alongside fellow rappers AZ and Foxy Brown. They together formed a rap group called The Firm. Because of his performance on the song, Cormega was signed to Def Jam Recordings and recorded his first studio album The Testament. However, he was replaced with Nature in The Firm and later released from Def Jam, indefinitely shelving The Testament.

He nevertheless released his debut studio album, The Realness through LandSpeed Records and his own imprint Legal Hustle Records. The album gained both critical and commercial success, peaking at number 111 on the U.S. Billboard 200. It was supported by two singles: "You Don't Want It" and "Get Out My Way". The following year, he released his next studio album, The True Meaning, to further success and acclaim, it became his highest-charting entry on the U.S. Billboard 200, peaking at number 95 on the chart. It contained the singles "Built for This" and "The Come Up", the latter which featured Large Professor.

In 2002, Body Shop Records released an authorized/unauthorized compilation titled Hustler/Rapper: Unreleased classics, collabo's + Freestyles.

In 2004, he released his first compilation album, Legal Hustle. The Testament, originally recorded in the late 90s, was released as his third studio album in 2005. It was supported by one single, "One Love". In 2009, he released his fourth studio album Born and Raised via Aura Records. It included the single "Dirty Game". He released another compilation album, Raw Forever, in 2011.

In 2014, Cormega released his fifth studio album Mega Philosophy through Slimstyle Records. In 2018, he released his first extended play, Mega.

== Albums ==
=== Studio albums ===
List of studio albums, with selected chart positions
Title	Album details	Peak chart positions		
Title	Album details	US	US R&B	US Ind.
The Realness	Released: July 24, 2001; Label: Legal Hustle Records, Landspeed Records; Formats: CD, LP, cassette, digital download	111	24	4
The True Meaning	Released: June 11, 2002; Label: Legal Hustle Records; Formats: CD, LP, cassette, digital download	95	25	5
The Testament	Released: February 22, 2005; Label: Legal Hustle Records; Formats: CD, LP, cassette, digital download	—	76	46
Born and Raised	Released: October 20, 2009; Label: Aura Records; Formats: CD, digital download	—	56	—
Mega Philosophy	Released: July 22, 2014; Label: Slimstyle Records; Formats: CD, LP, cassette, digital download	—	30	—
The Realness II	Released: October 7, 2022; Label: Viper Records; Formats: CD, LP, cassette, digital download	—	—	—
"—" denotes a recording that did not chart or was not released in that territory.

=== Compilation albums ===
List of compilation albums, with selected chart positions
Title	Album details	Peak chart positions		
Title	Album details	US	US R&B	US Ind.
Legal Hustle	Released: May 25, 2004; Label: Koch Records; Formats: CD, LP, digital download	174	22	8
Raw Forever	Released: September 27, 2011; Label: Aura Records; Formats: CD, digital download	—	—	—
"—" denotes a recording that did not chart or was not released in that territory.

=== Collaboration albums ===
List of collaboration albums, with selected chart positions
Title	Album details	Peak chart positions		
Title	Album details	US	US R&B	US Ind.
My Brother's Keeper (with Lake)	Released: August 22, 2006; Label: Fastlife; Formats: CD, digital download	—	—	—
"—" denotes a recording that did not chart or was not released in that territory.

=== Soundtrack albums ===
List of soundtrack albums, with selected chart positions
Title	Album details	Peak chart positions		
Title	Album details	US	US R&B	US Ind.
Who Am I?	Released: October 23, 2007; Label: Legal Hustle Entertainment; Formats: CD, DVD	—	—	—
"—" denotes a recording that did not chart or was not released in that territory.

== Extended plays ==
List of extended plays, with selected chart positions
Title	Album details	Peak chart positions		
Title	Album details	US	US R&B	US Ind.
Mega	Released: December 26, 2018 Re-Released: April 10, 2020; Label: Aura, Cormega Music; Formats: CD, LP, cassette, digital download	—	—	—
"—" denotes a recording that did not chart or was not released in that territory.

== Singles ==
Title	Year	Peak chart positions	Album
Title	Year	U.S. Rap	Album
"You Don't Want It"	2000	41	The Realness
"Get Out My Way"	2001	—	The Realness
"Built for This"	2002	—	The True Meaning
"The Come Up" (featuring Large Professor)	2002	—	The True Meaning
"Let It Go" (featuring M.O.P.)	2004	—	Legal Hustle
"Dangerous" (featuring Unda P. and Vybz Kartel)	2004	—	Legal Hustle
"One Love"	2005	—	The Testament
"The Saga (The Remix)"	2007	—	non-album singles
"Fresh" (featuring Red Alert, PMD, Grand Puba, KRS-One and Big Daddy Kane)	2008	—	non-album singles
"Dirty Game"	2009	—	Born and Raised
"Guns and Butter" (featuring Gunplay)	2016	—	non-album single

== Guest Appearances ==
Title	year	Artist	Album
Set it Off	1992	PHD	Without Warning
Affirmative Action	1996	The Firm	It Was Written
"U Got Me Goin' (Remix)"	1996	II D Extreme	—N/a
"What's Ya Poison"	1999	Mobb Deep	Murda Muzik
"Who Can I Trust?"	1999	Lil Wayne	Violator: The Album
"On the Real"	2000	Screwball, Havoc	Y2k: The Album
"Three"	2000	Prodigy	H.N.I.C.
"Cormega Interlude"	2000	Tony Touch	The Piece Maker
"Da Bridge 2001"	2000	Da Bridge	Nas & Ill Will Records Presents QB's Finest
"They Force MY Hand"	2001	Tragedy Khadafi	Against All Odds
"Loyalty"	2001	Screwball	Loyalty
"All I Need Is You"	2001	Hi-Tek, Jonell	Hi-Teknology
"We Gon Buck"	2001	Capone-n-Noreaga, Lake	Lake Ent. Prs.: 41st Side
"The Jump Up"	2001	benzino, Superb, Raekwon	The Benzino Project
"U Crazy"	2002	The Beatnuts	The Originators
"Back Against the Wall"	2007	Statik Selektah, Royce da 5'9"	Spell My Name Right: The Album
"No Holding Back"	2007	Statik Selektah, AZ	Spell My Name Right: The Album
"Back At It (Remix)"	2008	Little Brother	And Justus for All
"Radiant Jewels"	2009	RZA, Sean Price, Raekwon	Wu-Tang Chamber Music
"Born Survivor"	2010	Inspectah Deck	Manifesto
"Catch the Thrown"	2012	Public ENemy	Most of My Heroes...
"focused Up"	2012	Large Professor, Tragedy Khadafi	Professor @Large
"Power"	2013	Ill Bill, O.C.	The Grimey Awards
"Ruff Town"	2013	Roc Marciano	The Pimpire Strikes Backeth
"War Scars"	2014	Roc Marciano	Marci Beaucoup
"The Warrior, The Philosopher, & The Rebel"	2014	A-Villa, Lil' Fame, Killer MIke	Carry on Tradition
"Fallen Soldiers"	2014	Havoc	13 Relloaded
"Industry Rmx 2"	2015	Large Professor, Roc Marciano, Inspectah Deck	Re:Living
"Hear Me Now"	2016	Havoc & The Alchemist	The Silent Partner
"Capitol Hill"	2017	Kool G Rap, Sheek Louch, Manolo	Return of the Don
"They Got Sonny"	2020	Conway the Machine & The Alchemist	LULU
"Full Circle"	2020	The Firm	King's Disease
"Deceitful Intentions"	2023	Lloyd Banks	Course of the Inev. 3
"it's Different"	2023	Statik Selektah, M.O.P.	Round Trip
"Weight of the World"	2024	Rome streetz	Hatton Garden Holdup
