= The Alchemist production discography =

This is a list of all of the songs that The Alchemist has produced.

== 1997 ==
=== Dilated Peoples ===
- "Third Degree" (featuring Defari)
- "Confidence"

== 1998 ==
=== Buc Fifty – Still Breathin'/Dead End Street (CDS) ===
- "Still Breathin'"
- "Dead End Street"

=== Baron Ricks – Rags to Riches (CDS) ===
- "Harlem River Drive"

=== The High and Mighty – Eastern Conference Finals ===
- "Open Mic Night" (feat. Rasheed & Baby Black)
- "E = mc2" (feat. Evidence)

== 1999 ==
=== Defari – Focused Daily ===
- "Focused Daily"
- "Killing Spree"
- "Checkstand 3"

=== Group Home – A Tear for the Ghetto ===
- "Stupid Muthafuckas (30 Minutes to War)"

=== The High and Mighty – Home Field Advantage ===
- "Top Prospects" (feat. Evidence & Defari)
- "Open Mic Night" (Remix) [feat. Thirstin Howl III & Wordsworth]

=== – Sun, Moon, and Stars (CDS) ===
- "The Conflict"

=== Various Artists – Violator: The Album ===
- "Who Can I Trust?" - Lil Wayne & Cormega {co-produced by Jonathan Williams}

=== Rascalz – Global Warning ===
- "On the Run"

=== Mobb Deep – Murda Muzik ===
- "Thug Muzik"
- "The Realest" (feat. Kool G Rap)

=== Various Artists – GTA III (soundtrack) ===
- "I'm the King" - Royce da 5'9"

=== Terror Squad – Terror Squad: The Album ===
- "99 Live"
- "Bring It On"

=== Swollen Members – Balance ===
- "Front Street"
- "Circuit Breaker"
- "Strength"
- "Horrified Nights"

=== Pharoahe Monch – Internal Affairs ===
- "No Mercy" (feat. M.O.P.)

=== Maylay Sparks – Crazy ===
- "It's Ours"

=== Buc Fifty - Metal's Advocate (CDS) ===
- "Metal's Advocate"
- "Permanent Scars" (featuring Agallah)

=== Various Artists - Defenders of the Underworld (CDS) ===
- "Worst Enemy"

=== Agallah – Crookie Monster (CDS) ===
- "The Crookie Monster" {co-produced by Agallah}

=== Casual – VIP (CDS) ===
- "I Gotta Get Down"

=== Black Attack – My Word (CDS) ===
- "What the F#*! (Going On in Here!?)" [feat. Missin' Linx]

== 2000 ==
=== Missin' Linx – Exhibit A ===
- "Family Ties" (featuring Freddie Foxxx)

=== Freddie Foxxx – Industry Shakedown ===
- "Tell 'Em I'm Here"
- "Stock in This Game"

=== Dilated Peoples – The Platform ===
- "The Platform"
- "Guaranteed"
- "The Main Event"
- "Annihilation"
- "The Last Line of Defense"

=== Prodigy – H.N.I.C. ===
- "Keep It Thoro"
- "Three" (feat. Cormega)
- "Trials of Love" (feat. B.K.)
- "Veteran's Memorial"

=== Capone-N-Noreaga – The Reunion ===
- "Queens" (feat. Complexions)
- "Bang Bang" (feat. Foxy Brown)

=== Various Artists – Lyricist Lounge 2 ===
- "The Grimy Way" - Big Noyd & Prodigy
- "Right & Exact" - Dilated Peoples

=== Various Artists – QB's Finest ===
- "Money" - Mr. Challace

=== Tony Touch – The Piece Maker ===
- "Get Back" - D12
- "Basics" - Prodigy
- "Cormega Interlude"

=== Everlast – Eat at Whitey's ===
- "Deadly Assassins"

=== Cypress Hill - Rap Superstar (CDS) ===
- "Rap Superstar (Alchemist Remix)"

=== Black Ops - Battle Cry VlS ===
- "Battle Cry" (Thunderground Mix)

=== Buc Fifty – CDS ===
- "Electric Chair Rhymin'"

=== Severe – CDS ===
- "If Words Could" (feat. O.C.)
- "My Way"

== 2001 ==
=== Big Pun – Endangered Species ===
- "Mamma"

=== Fat Joe – Jealous Ones Still Envy (J.O.S.E.) ===
- "Definition of a Don" (feat. Remy Ma)

=== Guru – Baldhead Slick & da Click ===
- "In Here" (feat. Black Jesus, Killah Priest & Timbo King)
- "Collecting Props" (feat. Mr. Moe & Pete Powers)

=== Cormega – The Realness ===
- "Fallen Soldiers" (Remix)

=== Jadakiss – Kiss tha Game Goodbye ===
- "We Gonna Make It" (feat. Styles P)
- "Feel Me"

=== Lake Entertainment Presents: The 41st Side ===
- "Crush Linen" - Lake
- "Let 'Em Hang" - Nas, Lake & V12
- "We Gon' Buck" - Cormega, Capone-N-Noreaga & Lake

=== Dilated Peoples – Expansion Team ===
- "Live on Stage"
- "Worst Comes to Worst"
- "Panic"

=== Smut Peddlers – Porn Again ===
- "The Red Light"

=== Ghostface Killah – Bulletproof Wallets ===
- "The Forest"
- "The Juks" (feat. Trife)
- "Street Chemistry"

=== Swollen Members – Bad Dreams ===
- "Bad Dreams"
- "Dark Riders"

=== Madchild + Moka Only are… Perfect Strangers ===
- “Forefront”

=== Mobb Deep – Infamy ===
- "Get at Me"

=== Agallah – Da Mixtape Iz the Album ===
- "Sun You Know How It Goes"

=== Buc Fifty – Locked Down ===
- "Scandalous" (featuring J-Ro)
- "Locked Down"
- "Buc Buc Buc"

=== Various Artists - Lyrics of Fury Vol. 1 ===
- "Boy's About to Flip" - Buc Fifty
- "Forefront" - Perfect Strangers

=== Tha Eastsidaz – Duces 'n Trayz: The Old Fashioned Way ===
- "Friends" (featuring Kokane)
- "Connected" (featuring Mobb Deep & Kokane)

== 2002 ==
=== Crimewave – Scripturewon: The Beginning Of ===
- "Johnny"

=== Boot Camp Click - The Chosen Few ===
- "Let's Get Down 2 Bizness"

=== D&D Crew – D&D Project II ===
- "Kill It" - R.A., Agallah, Guru & Channel Live

=== Royce da 5'9" – Rock City 2.0 ===
- "D-Elite Pt.2" (feat. Doze Detroit Homies)

=== Saigon - CDS ===
- "We da Click" (featuring Big Twins)

=== Cormega – The True Meaning ===
- "The Legacy"

=== Nas – The Lost Tapes ===
- "My Way"
- "No Idea's Original"

=== – God's Son ===
- "Book of Rhymes"
- "Mastermind"
- "Revolutionary Warfare" (featuring Lake)
- "Thugz Mirror (Freestyle)"

=== Infamous Mobb – Special Edition ===
- "Intro"
- "IM³"
- "Killa Queens" (feat. Prodigy & Big Noyd)
- "Special Edition"
- "The Family" (Skit)
- "Mobb Niggaz (The Sequel)" [feat. Prodigy]
- "Back in the Days" (feat. Chinky)
- "B.I.G. – T.W.I.N.S."
- "We Strive" (feat. Ty-Maxx)
- "Reality Rap" (feat. Blitz & Kaos)

=== Linkin Park – Reanimation ===
- "Frgt/10" (featuring Chali 2na)

=== Fat Joe – Loyalty ===
- "Bust at You" (featuring Scarface, Tony Sunshine & Baby)

=== Krumbsnatcha - Respect All Fear None ===
- "Streets Is Calling" (featuring Mexicana)

=== Buc Fifty – Battle Axe Warriors II ===
- "Bangin'"

=== Styles P – A Gangster and a Gentleman ===
- "A Gangster and a Gentleman"
- "Black Magic" (feat. Angie Stone)

=== 50 Cent – "Wanksta" ===
- "Wanksta (Alchemist Remix)"

=== Snoop Dogg presents: Doggystyle All-Stars – Welcome to tha House Vol. 1 ===
- "Hey You!" - Snoop Dogg, Soopafly, E. White

=== DJ Babu – Duck Season Vol. 1 ===
- "The Man, the Icon" - Big Daddy Kane

== 2003 ==
=== Big Noyd – Only the Strong ===
- "Only the Strong"
- "Shoot 'Em Up (Bang Bang) Part 1"
- "Noyd Holdin' It Down"
- "Shoot 'Em Up (Bang Bang) Part 2"
- "Air It Out"
- "N.O.Y.D."

=== PMD – The Awakening ===
- "The Awakening"

=== Royce da 5'9" – Build & Destroy: The Lost Sessions ===
- "U Don't Know Me"
- "I Won't Be"

=== Tragedy Khadafi - Still Reportin'... ===
- "Stay Free" (featuring Littles)

=== Various Artists – Beef (OST) ===
- "Drama" - Prodigy & Big Twin

=== Mobb Deep – Free Agents: The Murda Mixtape ===
- "The Illest"
- "Backwards"
- "Serious"
- "Fourth of July"
- "The Thirst"

=== Raze – Fallback ===
- "Fallback"

=== Prozack Turner – Death, Taxes and Prozack ===
- "Dear Old Dad"

=== Million – Million A.K.A. Endiana Jonez ===
- "No Matta"
- "Da Drama"

=== Ill Bill - Howie Made Me Do It ===
- "The Name's Bill"

=== Craig G – This Is Now!!! ===
- "Wrong Chick"

=== Sheek Louch – Walk witt Me ===
- "Turn It Up"

=== State Property – The Chain Gang Vol. 2 ===
- "Still in Effect" (featuring Freeway & Neef)

=== Eminem – Straight from the Lab ===
- "Monkey See, Monkey Do"

== 2004 ==
=== Saigon – Warning Shots ===
- "Stocking Cap"
- "Yes"

=== Poverty – Rise From Ruin ===
- "Rise From Ruin"
- "The Pawn"
- "Life Sucks"

=== Uno Dos – Among the Elite ===
- "Niggaz Ain't Built"

=== Jadakiss – Kiss of Death ===
- "Still Feel Me"

=== Papoose – Election Day (Papoose for the Streets) ===
- "Two Step (featuring Prodigy & Grafh)

=== Lakey the Kid - "One Never Knows" ===
- "One Never Knows" (featuring Nas)

=== Dilated Peoples – Neighborhood Watch ===
- "Marathon"
- "Neighborhood Watch"
- "Poisonous"
- "World on Wheels"

=== Snoop Dogg – R&G (Rhythm & Gangsta): The Masterpiece ===
- "(Intro) I Love to Give You Light"

=== Cypress Hill – Till Death Do Us Part ===
- "Latin Thugs"

=== Infamous Mobb – Blood Thicker Than Water Vol. 1 ===
- "Gunz Up"

=== Mobb Deep – Amerikaz Nightmare ===
- "Win or Lose"
- "Got It Twisted"
- "When U Hear The"
- "Got It Twisted (Remix)" [feat. Twista]

=== Nelly – Sweat ===
- "Playa" (feat. Mobb Deep)

== 2005 ==
=== AP.9 – Mac Dre Presents Thizz Nation Volume 4 ===
- "In My Life"

=== Diamond D – The Diamond Mine ===
- "Y'all Niggaz Need to Know"

=== Sheek Louch – After Taxes ===
- "Movie Niggas"

=== Big Shug – Who's Hard? ===
- "Who? (Got My Back)"
- "Who's Hard?"

=== Elzhi – Witness My Growth ===
- "The Alchemist"

=== 113 – 113 Degrés ===
- "L'école du Crime (featuring Mobb Deep)"

=== Tragedy Khadafi – Thug Matrix ===
- "Stay Free (featuring Littles)"
- "Love Is Love (featuring Jinx)"

=== Funkmaster Flex - The Car Show ===
- "Just a Touch" (featuring 50 Cent & Paul Wall)

=== Jae Millz – Back to the Future ===
- "Take a Betta Look"

=== Chryme Fam – The EP XL ===
- "Street Shit"

=== Big Noyd – On the Grind ===
- "Louder (featuring Prodigy)"

=== Saigon - CDS ===
- "E.A.T."

== 2006 ==
=== B-Real – The Gunslinger, Pt. II: Fist Full of Dollars ===
- "Put on Your Vest (featuring Defari)

=== Blaq Poet – Rewind: Deja Screw ===
- "Bloody Mess"

=== Pitch Black – Revenge ===
- "Put That Work In"

=== Big Noyd – The Stick Up Kid ===
- "That's How You Get Dead"

=== Nashawn – Napalm ===
- "Write Your Name"

=== Defari – Street Music ===
- "Make My Own"

=== Swollen Members – Black Magic ===
- "Weight" (featuring The Alchemist & Ghostface Killah)

=== Styles P – Time Is Money ===
- "I'm Black (featuring Floetry)"

=== Cam'ron – Killa Season ===
- "Wet Wipes"

=== Dilated Peoples – 20/20 ===
- "Back Again"
- "20/20"

=== Agallah – You Already Know ===
- "Ride Out (O.G.G.G.)"
- "On the Ave"

=== Various Artists – The Re-Up ===
- "We Ride for Shady" - Obie Trice featuring Cashis)
- "There He Is" - Bobby Creekwater
- "Tryin' ta Win" - Stat Quo

=== Mobb Deep – Blood Money ===
- "The Infamous"

=== Planet Asia – The Medicine ===
- "Over Your Head" (Produced with Evidence)

=== Ras Kass – Eat or Die ===
- "Get It In"

=== Raze – Full Scale: G-Check ===
- "Bosses"

=== Hollow da Don – Houston to NY ===
- "Hold Me Down"

=== Scarface and The Product – One Hunid ===
- "G-Type"

=== Mistah F.A.B. – Recess (A Play Your Position Extra) ===
- "Fuck a Chorus"

== 2007 ==
=== Cormega – Who Am I? ===
- "Who Am I"
- "718" (not LP version)

=== Prodigy – Return of the Mac ===
- Entire Album

=== Joell Ortiz – The Brick: Bodega Chronicles ===
- "BQE"

=== Dilated Peoples – The Release Party ===
- "Spit It Clearly"

=== Tragedy Khadafi – The Death of Tragedy ===
- "Milk Murder"

=== N.O.R.E. – Cocaine on Steroids ===
- "Drink Champ"

=== Pharoahe Monch – Desire ===
- "Desire (featuring Showtyme)"

=== Evidence – The Weatherman LP ===
- "Letyourselfgo (featuring The Alchemist)"
- "Chase the Clouds Away"
- "Evidence Is Everywhere"
- "Line of Scrimmage"
- "Born in LA"

=== Styles P – Super Gangster (Extraordinary Gentleman) ===
- "Green Piece of Paper"
- "All I Know is Pain (featuring The Alchemist"

=== Prodigy – The Pre Mac ===
- "That's Why Nigga"
- "550 Benz"
- "Straight Murder (featuring 50 Cent)"
- "What A Real Mobb Do (featuring Big Twins)"

=== Infamous Mobb – Reality Rap ===
- "Reality Rap"
- "Hustle Hard" (featuring The Alchemist)

=== Illa Ghee – Bullet and a Bracelet ===
- "Maintenance Man"

== 2008 ==
=== AX – Con (PSP Game OST) ===
- "The Champ"

=== La the Darkman – Return of the Darkman ===
- "Fresh Flowers"

=== DJ Muggs and Planet Asia – Pain Language ===
- "Pain Language (Alchemist remix)

=== Fat Joe – The Elephant in the Room ===
- "My Conscience (featuring KRS-One)"

=== Prodigy – H.N.I.C. Pt. 2 ===
- "The Life"
- "Young Veterans"
- "Illuminati"
- "Veteran's Memorial Part II"
- "Dirty New Yorker (featuring Havoc)"
- "Represent Me"
- "The Dough"

=== Lil Wayne – Tha Carter III ===
- "You Ain't Got Nuthin" (featuring Fabolous & Juelz Santana)

=== I.A.Dap – Lil' Dap ===
- "Intro I.A.Dap"
- "Get It"

=== Termanology – Politics As Usual ===
- "Hood Shit (featuring Prodigy)"

=== Various Artists - Fresh Rhymes and Videotape Vol. 1 ===
- "The Last Shall Be First" (Dilated Peoples)
- "Left Out in the Cold" (Aceyalone, The Alchemist, 88-Keys)

=== Bekay – Hunger Pains ===
- "I Am"

=== Evidence – The Layover EP ===
- "So Fresh" (featuring The Alchemist)
- "The Far Left" (featuring The Alchemist & Fashawn)
- "To Be Determined" (featuring Aloe Blacc & Elzhi)

== 2009 ==
=== B-Real – Smoke N Mirrors ===
- "6 Minutes" (featuring Young De & Tekneek)

=== Capone-N-Noreaga – Channel 10 ===
- "Follow the Dollar"

=== Jadakiss – The Last Kiss ===
- "Death Wish" (featuring Lil Wayne)

=== Soul Assassins – Intermission ===
- "Classical" (featuring Evidence & Sick Jacken)
- "Gunshots" (featuring The Alchemist & Chace Infinite)

=== La Coka Nostra – A Brand You Can Trust ===
- "Choose Your Side" (featuring Bun B)

=== Fabolous – Loso's Way ===
- "Lullaby"

=== Sick Jacken - Stray Bullets ===
- "Born in LA" (featuring Evidence & Chance Infinite)

=== Slaughterhouse - Slaughterhouse ===
- "Microphone"

=== Raekwon – Only Built 4 Cuban Linx... Pt. II ===
- "Surgical Gloves"

=== Termanology – Hood Politics VI: Time Machine ===
- "I See Dead People"

=== Big Twins – The Project Kid ===
- "When I Walk Away" (featuring The Alchemist)
- "Wanna Be Down"
- "Smart Niggaz" (featuring Krondon)

== 2010 ==
=== B.o.B – May 25th ===
- "Gladiators" (featuring J. Cole)

=== Cam'ron and Vado – Boss of All Bosses 2.5 ===
- "Ya' Killin' Me" (featuring Kid Cudi)

=== Capone-N-Noreaga – The War Report 2: Report the War ===
- "Pain"

=== DJ Kayslay – More Than Just a DJ ===
- "Hustle Game" (featuring Bun B, Webbie, Lil Boosie & Nicole Wray)

=== Gangrene – Gutter Water ===
- "Not High Enough"
- "Gutter Water" (featuring Raekwon)
- "Get into Some Gangster Shit" (featuring Planet Asia)
- "Chain Swinging"
- "Breathing Down Yo Neck" (featuring M.E.D.)
- "From Another Orbit" (featuring Roc C)
- "Standing in the Shadows"
- "Brass Knuckle Rap" (featuring Guilty Simpson)

=== – Sawblade EP ===
- "Freshest Rhymes"
- "Operating Room"

=== Hollow da Don – Money Changes, Loyalty Don't ===
- "Greatness"

=== Inspectah Deck – Manifesto ===
- "The Champion"

=== Planet Asia and Gold Chain Military – Chain of Command ===
- "GCM Meets ALC"

=== Raekwon – Cocainism Vol. 2 ===
- "Big Beat"
- "Wallys & Pringles"

=== Rakaa – Crown of Thorns ===
- "Upstairs"
- "Aces High" (featuring Evidence, Defari & Fashawn

=== Ras Kass – A.D.I.D.A.S. (All Day I Dream About Spittin) ===
- "Linguistics"

=== Roc C – Scapegoat ===
- "I'm Ready" (featuring Glasses Malone)

=== Statik Selektah – The Left-Overs (Of Whats to Come) EP ===
- "On the Corner" (featuring Big Twins, Freddie Gibbs, Planet Asia & Tri-State)

=== Styles P – The Green Ghost Project ===
- "Make Millions from Entertainment"

== 2011 ==
=== Blu – j e s u s ===
- "d o o w h o p +"

=== ChrisCo – How Does It Feel EP ===
- "Intro"
- "We Run It" (featuring Jon Connor & Marv Won)
- "Drop That" (featuring Crooked I & Young Knox)
- "How Does It Feel"
- "A Different High" (featuring Obie Trice & Killa Kyleon)

=== Curren$y – Covert Coup ===
- Entire EP

=== Dirt Nasty – Nasty as I Wanna Be ===
- "As Nasty as I Wanna Be"

=== Evidence – Cats and Dogs ===
- "The Liner Notes" (featuring Aloe Blacc)
- "The Red Carpet" (featuring Raekwon, Ras Kass)
- "James Hendrix" (Evidence & The Alchemist, as "StepBrothers")
- "Crash"
- "Where You Come From?" (featuring Rakaa Iriscience, Lil' Fame, Termanology)
- "Sleep Deprivation"

=== Hollow da Don – Loyalty Is a Way of Life ===
- "Hollow ta Con" (featuring Conceited)

=== Kool G Rap – Riches, Royalty, Respect ===
- "American Nightmare" (featuring Havoc)

=== M.E.D. – Bang Your Head 3 (Special Edition) ===
- "Bounce Back"

=== – Classic ===
- "War & Love" (featuring Oh No)

=== Mobb Deep – Black Cocaine (EP) ===
- "Get It Forever" (featuring Nas)
- "Black Cocaine"
- "Waterboarding"

=== – Steaming ===
- "Love Ya'll More"
- "Dog Shit" (featuring Nas)
- "Whole Lotta Thug"

=== N.O.R.E. – Scared Money EP ===
- "Slime Father" (feat. Cory Gunz)

=== Prodigy – The Ellsworth Bumpy Johnson EP ===
- "The One and Only"
- "For One Night Only"

=== Raekwon – Shaolin vs. Wu-Tang ===
- "Ferry Boat Killaz"

=== Reks – Rhythmatic Eternal King Supreme ===
- "Why Cry" (featuring Styles P)

=== Rick Ross ===
- "Perfectionist" (featuring Meek Mill)

=== Roc C – Stoned Genius ===
- "Starchild" (featuring The Alchemist)

=== Roc Marciano and Gangrene – Greneberg ===
- "Papercuts"
- "Sewer Gravy"
- "Hoard 90"

=== Royce da 5'9" – Success Is Certain ===
- "I Ain't Coming Down"

=== Sir Michael Rocks – Premier Politics ===
- "Neiman Marcus"
- "She Gotta Have It"

=== STS – The Illustrious ===
- "The Interview"

== 2012 ==
=== Awar – The Laws of Nature ===
- "Tunnel Vision"
- "I Arrived" (featuring Latoiya Williams)
- "Strictly Business"
- "Cut Throat Rap" (featuring Roc Marciano & Grafh)

=== Battles – Dross Glop 2 ===
- "Futura" (The Alchemist remix)

=== Bishop Lamont – The Layover ===
- "I Swear" (featuring Royce da 5'9" & Swish)

=== Bodega Bamz – Strictly 4 My P.A.P.I.Z. ===
- "Tres Puntos" (featuring A$ton Matthews)

=== Dave East – No Regrets ===
- "Waste My Time"

=== Domo Genesis – No Idols ===
- Entire Album

=== Durag Dynasty ===
- "Glass of Astonishment"
- "The World's Most Dangerous"
- "Spudnik Webb" (featuring Blu & Killa Kali)

=== Gangrene – Vodka and Ayahuasca ===
- "Drink Up" (featuring Roc Marciano)
- "Dump Truck" (featuring Prodigy)
- "Due Work"
- "Dark Shades" (featuring Evidence & Roc C)
- "Livers for Sale"
- "Dream Nap"

=== Hodgy Beats – Untitled (EP) ===
- "Cookie Coma"
- "In a Dream"

=== Joey FaTTs – Chipper Jones Vol. 2 ===
- "Wave Matthews Band" (featuring A$AP Yams & Da$h)

=== Meyhem Lauren – Mandatory Brunch Meetings ===
- "Brand Name Marijuana"

=== Prodigy – H.N.I.C. 3 ===
- "Without Rhyme or Reason"
- "Slept On"
- "Live"
- "Serve Em"

=== Prodigy – The Bumpy Johnson Album ===
- "The One and Only"
- "Medicine Man"
- "For One Night Only"

=== Roc Marciano – Reloaded ===
- "Flash Gordon"
- "Pistolier"
- "Paradise for Pimps"

=== Sean Price – Mic Tyson ===
- "Genesis of the Omega"
- "Bar-Barian"
- "STFU Part 2"
- "Bully Rap" (featuring Realm Reality)

=== Action Bronson and The Alchemist – Rare Chandeliers ===
- Entire Album

=== ScHoolboy Q – Habits and Contradictions ===
- "My Homie"

=== Slaughterhouse – On the House ===
- "All on Me"

=== Styles P – The Diamond Life Project ===
- "The Myth"

=== Termanology and Lil' Fame – Fizzyology ===
- "Fizzyology"

=== The Alchemist – Yacht Rock (EP) ===
- (Side A) (featuring Action Bronson, Roc Marciano & Oh No)
- (Side B) (featuring Big Twins, Chuck Inglish & Blu)

=== Willie the Kid – The Cure 2 ===
- "Waste Not.Want Not"

== 2013 ==
=== Durag Dynasty – 360 Waves ===
- Entire Album

=== Domo Genesis ===
- "Drugs Got Me Spiritual" (featuring Remy Banks)

=== Prodigy – Albert Einstein ===
- Entire Album

=== The Alchemist – SSUR (EP) ===
- "Camp Registration" (featuring Step Brothers, Action Bronson, Blu & Domo Genesis) {co-prod. by Bombay da Realest Music}
- "1010 Wins" (featuring Domo Genesis, Action Bronson, Meyhem Lauren, Roc Marciano & Despot)
- "Tesla" (featuring Domo Genesis, Freddie Gibbs & Hodgy Beats)

=== Mac Miller – Watching Movies with the Sound Off ===
- "Red Dot Music" (featuring Action Bronson)

=== Statik Selektah – Extended Play ===
- "Live from the Era" (featuring Pro Era) {co-prod. by Statik Selektah}

=== Joey Bada$$ – Summer Knights ===
- "Trap Door"

=== Willie the Kid – Masterpiece Theatre (EP) ===
- Entire EP

=== Earl Sweatshirt – Doris ===
- "Uncle Al"

=== Agallah – Red V ===
- "Identity Theft"

=== Step Brothers ===
- "Nothing to See" / "Hear" {co-prod. by Evidence}
- "Ron Carter"

=== Boldy James – My 1st Chemistry Set ===
- Entire Album

=== Roc Marciano – The Pimpire Strikes Back ===
- "Sincerely Antique" (featuring Action Bronson & Willie the Kid)
- "Ten Toes Down" (featuring Knowledge The Pirate)

== 2014 ==
=== Agallah – Past and Present ===
- "Open Invitation"
- "The Gods Must Be Crazy"

=== Step Brothers – Lord Steppington ===
- Entire Album

=== Schoolboy Q – Oxymoron ===
- "Break the Bank"

=== Prodigy – Albert Einstein: P=mc2 (Bonus EP) ===
- "Mightier Pen"
- "Infamous Allegiance"
- "Gnarly"
- "Murder Goes Down"

=== A$ton Matthews – A$ton 3:16 ===
- "Money, Mackin, Murda"

=== Mobb Deep – The Infamous Mobb Deep ===
- "Lifetime"

=== Various Artists – The Boondocks Mixtape (Season 4) ===
- Killer Mike – "The Boonies"

=== D.I.T.C. – The Remix Project ===
- "We All (Alchemist Remix)" [featuring O.C. & A.G.]

=== Trash Talk – No Peace ===
- "Amnesiatic"
- "Reprieve"

=== Mickey Facts - 740 Park Avenue ===
- "Still Better Than You" {co-produced by Mickey}

=== Big Twins – TG1 ===
- "Fuck All Ya"

=== Dilated Peoples – Directors of Photography ===
- "Cut My Teeth"
- "L.A. River Drive" (featuring Sick Jacken)

=== Earl Sweatshirt ===
- "45"

=== Termanology – Shut Up and Rap ===
- "El Wave" (featuring Willie the Kid & Reks) {co-prod. by Statik Selektah}

=== Militainment – N.O.R.E. Presents: DRINKS ===
- "Change Ya Life" - N.O.R.E., Cityboy Dee, Sanogram & Smoova

=== Fashawn – FASH-ionably Late ===
- Entire EP

== 2015 ==
=== Blu – Soul Amazing (Part Five) [The Alchemist Edition] ===
- "Cobb"
- "Palisades" (featuring Big Twin, Killa Kali & Planet Asia)

=== Fashawn – The Ecology ===
- "Letter F"

=== Action Bronson – Mr. Wonderful ===
- "Terry"
- "Falconry" (featuring Meyhem Lauren & Big Body Bes)
- "Galactic Love"

=== Earl Sweatshirt and Action Bronson ===
- "Warlord Leather"

=== Big Twins – Thrive 2 ===
- "Live Life"

=== Joey Bada$$ ===
- "Aim High" {co-prod. by Harry Fraud}

=== Ab-Soul ===
- "47 Bars"

=== Squala Orphans - Radical Eyez ===
- "Death on a Dollar Bill"
- "1013"

=== Kamiyada - Yada Yada ===
- "Happy Pills"

=== Oh No & The Alchemist – Music of Grand Theft Auto V ===
- Gangrene – "Play It Cool" (featuring Samuel T Herring & Earl Sweatshirt)
- Tunde Adebimpe – "Speedline Miracle Masterpiece" (featuring Sal P & Sinkane) {produced with Josh Werner & Sinkane}
- Phantogram – "K.Y.S.A." {produced with Josh Carter}
- MNDR – "Lock + Load" (featuring Killer Mike)
- Wavves – "Leave"
- Currensy & Freddie Gibbs – "Fetti"
- Action Bronson & Danny Brown – "Bad News"

=== Gangrene – You Disgust Me ===
- "Sheet Music" (featuring Sean Price & Havoc) {co-prod. by Party Supplies}
- "The Man with the Horn"
- "Noon Chuckas"
- "Just for Decoration" (featuring Evidence & Chuck Strangers)
- "The Hidden Hand"

=== IGT - The Alpha and Omega ===
- "Get It Cranked"

=== Eearz – Eearz to da Streets ===
- "Chain Reaction" {co-prod. by Mike WiLL Made-It}

=== The Game – The Documentary 2.5 ===
- "Like Father Like Son 2" (featuring Busta Rhymes)

=== 50 Cent – The Kanan Tape ===
- "Body Bags"

=== Talib Kweli - Fuck the Money ===
- "The Venetian" (featuring Ab-Soul)

== 2016 ==
=== The Alchemist – Craft Singles (45 Vinyl Series) ===
- Schoolboy Q – "Hoover Street (Original Version)"
- MC Eiht & Spice 1 – "Any Means"
- MC Eiht & Spice 1 – "Supply"
- Blu – "Cobb"
- Blu – "Palisades"
- Migos & Mac Miller – "Jabroni"
- Roc Marciano – "All for It"
- Curren$y & Lil Wayne – "Fat Albert"

=== Curren$y and The Alchemist – The Carrollton Heist ===
- Entire Album

==== The Carrollton Heist Remixed ====
- "Drowsy (Remix)" [featuring Action Bronson]

=== Your Old Droog ===
- "Hip-Hop Head"

=== Smoke DZA – He Has Risen ===
- "It's Real" {co-prod. by Harry Fraud}

=== AG da Coroner – Sip the Nectar ===
- "The Stick Up"

=== Westside Gunn – FLYGOD ===
- "Dudley Boyz" (featuring Action Bronson)

=== Kempi – Rap 'n Glorie ===
- "Herder"
- "Ik Wil Nikes" (featuring Willem)
- "King Kong" / "Observeer" (featuring Klemma)
- "D Boy"

=== Durag Dynasty ===
- "Class Picture" (featuring Domo Genesis)

=== Meyhem Lauren – Piatto D'Oro ===
- "Dragon vs. Wolf" (featuring Action Bronson)

=== Griselda Records – Don't Get Scared Now ===
- "Ajax" - Westside Gunn & Conway

=== Havoc and The Alchemist – The Silent Partner ===
- Entire Album

=== Smoke DZA – George Kush da Button (Don't Pass Trump the Blunt) ===
- "GT Performer" (featuring Action Bronson & Green R Fieldz)

=== Jace ===
- "On My Way" (featuring OG Maco)

=== Schoolboy Q – Blank Face LP ===
- "Kno Ya Wrong" (featuring Lance Skiiiwalker) {produced with J.LBS}

=== Reks – The Greatest X ===
- "Kites"

=== Cohen@Mushon – Yamim Arukim / ימים ארוכים ===
- "Ein Shum Be'aya" / "אין שום בעיה" (featuring Michael Swissa)

=== Action Bronson ===
- "Descendant of the Stars (Traveling the Stars Theme)"

=== Danny Brown – Atrocity Exhibition ===
- "White Lines"

== 2017 ==
=== The Alchemist – Craft Singles (45 Vinyl Series) ===
- Mach-Hommy – "Brand Name"

=== Prodigy – Hegelian Dialectic (The Book of Revelation) ===
- "Mystic"

=== Quelle Chris – Being You Is Great, I Wish I Could Be You More Often ===
- "Pendulum Swing" (featuring Homeboy Sandman)

=== Your Old Droog – Packs ===
- "Winston Red"

=== Kendrick Lamar ===
- "The Heart Part 4" (produced with Syk Sense, Axlfolie, & DJ Dahi)

=== Kendrick Lamar – DAMN. ===
- "FEAR."

=== Jay Worthy – Fantasy Island ===
- "Stepping Out" (featuring $Ha Hef)
- "Lost My Lex"
- "Rising Sun" (featuring Rugotti)
- "Boomerang" (featuring Polo100 & Big Body Bes) (produced with Budgie Beats)
- "Lil Freaks" (featuring Rugotti)
- "Miss You" (featuring Conway the Machine)
- "Four Fifteens" (featuring Meyhem Lauren & Ray Wright)

=== MF Doom – The Missing Notebook Rhymes ===
- "DOOMSAYERS"

=== Mr. Muthafuckin' eXquire - Brainiac ===
- "Strawberry Waterfalls"

=== Sean Price – Imperius Rex ===
- "Imperius Rex"

=== Action Bronson – Blue Chips 7000 ===
- "La Luna" (produced with Woody Jackson)
- "TANK" (featuring Big Body Bes)

=== Westside Gunn and MF Doom – WESTSIDEDOOM ===
- "2Stings"

=== Statik Selektah – 8 ===
- "Disrespekt" (featuring Prodigy) {produced with Statik Selektah}

=== Talib Kweli - Radio Silence ===
- "The Magic Hour"

== 2018 ==
=== Everlast - Whitey Ford's House of Pain ===
- "Dream State" {co-produced by Everlast & Divine Styler}

=== Evidence – Weather or Not ===
- "Throw It All Away"
- "Powder Cocaine" (featuring Slug and Catero)
- "Sell Me This Pen" (featuring The Alchemist and Mach Hommy)
- "Love Is a Funny Thing" (featuring Styles P, Rapsody, and Khrysis)

=== The Alchemist – Lunch Meat EP ===
- Entire EP

=== Awar - Spoils of War ===
- "Me Against the World"

=== AG - Taste of AMBrosia ===
- "Everything is Backwards"

=== Compound ===
- "Budz" (featuring Westside Gunn & Conway)

=== Westside Gunn – Supreme Blientele ===
- "Elizabeth"
- "Mean Gene"
- "Brossface Brippler" (featuring Benny the Butcher and Busta Rhymes)

=== The Alchemist – Craft Singles (45 Vinyl Series) ===
- Roc Marciano – "In Case You Forgot"
- Wiz Khalifa – "Universal Studios"

=== alt-J – Reduxer ===
- "Deadcrush" (featuring Danny Brown) (co-Produced by Trooko)

=== Roc Marciano – Behold a Dark Horse ===
- "Fabio"

=== Kool G Rap & .38 Spesh - Son of G Rap ===
- "Landmine" (featuring Ransom)

=== Curren$y, Freddie Gibbs and The Alchemist – Fetti ===
- Entire EP

=== Chuck Strangers - Consumers Park ===
- "Fresh"

=== The Alchemist ===
- "Fork in the Pot" (featuring Westside Gunn, Conway, & Schoolboy Q)
- "94' Ghost Shit" (featuring Westside Gunn & Conway)

=== Westside Gunn – Hitler Wears Hermes VI ===
- "Gigis"
- "Niggas in Puerto Rico" (featuring Benny the Butcher and Flee Lord)

=== Benny the Butcher – Tana Talk 3 ===
- "Rubber Bands & Weight"
- "Broken Bottles"
- "97 Hov" (produced with Daringer)
- "Fifty One" (featuring Westside Gunn)

=== The Alchemist – Bread EP ===
- Entire EP

=== Conway the Machine – EIF2: Eat What You Kill! ===
- "224 May Block"
- "Overdose"

== 2019 ==
=== Meyhem Lauren ===
- "Still Playing Celo"

=== Anderson Paak – Ventura ===
- "Make It Better" (featuring Smokey Robinson) {Produced with Anderson Paak & Fredwreck}

=== Westside Gunn – Flygod Is an Awesome God ===
- "Sensational Sherri"

=== Benny the Butcher – The Plugs I Met ===
- "Took the Money to the Plug House"
- "5 to 50" (featuring India)

=== Nas – The Lost Tapes II ===
- "It Never Ends"

=== The Cool Kids and The Alchemist – Layups ===
- "Layups"
- "Polansky" (featuring Boldy James & Shorty K)
- "WTF" (featuring Boldy James)

=== Westside Gunn – Hitler Wears Hermes 7 ===
- "Kool G" (featuring Conway The Machine & Benny The Butcher) {Produced with Daringer}
- "Lucha Bros" (featuring Curren$y & Benny The Butcher)
- "Outro"

=== Earl Sweatshirt – Feet of Clay ===
- "Mtomb" (featuring Liv.e)

2020 Deluxe Edition

- "Whole World" (featuring Maxo)

=== Action Bronson and The Alchemist – Lamb Over Rice ===
- Entire EP

=== D.I.T.C. - The Remix Project ===
- "We All"

=== Wiz Khalifa ===
- "Tequila Shots in the AM"

=== Step-Brothers ===
- "Burnt Tree"
- "How to Surf"

=== Schoolboy Q ===
- "W.Y.G.D.T.N.S."

=== Conway the Machine – Look What I Became ===
- "No Woman No Kids"

=== Alchemist – Yacht Rock 2 ===
- Entire Album

=== Boldy James and The Alchemist – Boldface EP ===
- Entire EP

=== Mach-Hommy – Wap Konn Jòj! ===
- "Chiney Brush" (featuring Quelle Chris)

== 2020 ==
=== Eminem – Music to Be Murdered By ===
- "Step Dad" {Produced with Eminem & Luis Resto}

=== Roc Marciano - Marcielago ===
- "Saw"

=== Boldy James and The Alchemist – The Price of Tea in China ===
- Entire Album

(Deluxe Version)

- "Pots and Pans" (featuring The Cool Kids & Shorty K)
- "Belvedere"
- "Bernadines"
- "Don Flamingo" (featuring El Camino

=== Eto - The Beauty of It ===
- "The Pot"

=== Jay Electronica – A Written Testimony ===
- "The Neverending Story" (featuring JAY-Z)

=== Conway the Machine and The Alchemist – LULU ===
- Entire EP

=== Westside Gunn – Pray for Paris ===
- "500 Dollar Ounces" (featuring Freddie Gibbs & Roc Marciano)
- "Claiborne Kick" (featuring Boldy James)

=== Freddie Gibbs and The Alchemist – Alfredo ===
- Entire Album

=== WIllie the Kid - Capital Gains ===
- "Brewster's Millions" (featuring Currensy)

=== Conway the Machine – From King to a God ===
- "Dough & Damani" {Produced with Daringer}

=== Hus Kingpin - The Hidden Painting ===
- "The Fight Club" (featuring Kurupt)

=== Action Bronson – Only for Dolphins ===
- "Sergio"

=== Jay Worthy - Two4One ===
- "Rainy Nights in SF" (featuring Larry June)
- "The Routine" (featuring J Perico)

=== Westside Gunn – Who Made the Sunshine ===
- "All Praises" (featuring Boldy James & Jadakiss)
- "Liz Loves Luger" (featuring Armani Caesar)

=== Mach-Hommy - Mach's Hard Lemonade ===
- "Smoked Caldon"
- "Clout Dracula"

== 2021 ==
=== The Alchemist – Carry the Fire ===
- Entire EP

=== billy woods - Brass ===
- "Giraffe Hunts"

=== Denzel Curry and Kenny Beats – UNLOCKED 1.5 ===
- "' Cosmic '.m4a" (featuring Joey Bada$$) {Produced with Kenny Beats}

=== Armand Hammer and The Alchemist – Haram ===
- Entire Album

=== Conway the Machine – La Maquina ===
- "200 Pies" (featuring 2 Chainz)

=== The Alchemist – This Thing of Ours ===
- Entire EP

=== Boldy James and The Alchemist – Bo Jackson ===
- Entire Album

=== Mello Music Group - Bushido ===
- "Iron"

=== Westside Gunn – Hitler Wears Hermes 8: Side B ===
- "Ostertag" (featuring Stove God Cooks)

=== AZ – Doe or Die II ===
- "Ritual" (featuring Conway the Machine & Lil Wayne)

=== The Alchemist – This Thing of Ours 2 ===
- Entire EP

=== Zack Fox ===
- "Shut the f*ck up talking to me"

=== Russ – CHOMP 2 ===
- "Distance" (featuring Conway the Machine & Ghostface Killah)

=== Boldy James and The Alchemist – Super Tecmo Bo ===
- Entire Album

=== The Alchemist – Cycles (Original Score) ===
- "The Jump"
- "The Cold"
- "The Discomfort"
- "The Bravery"
- "The Void"
- "The Return"

== 2022 ==
=== Earl Sweatshirt – Sick! ===
- "Old Friend"
- "Lye"

=== Dr. Dre – GTA Online: The Contract ===
- "Diamond Mind" (featuring Nipsey Hussle and Ty Dolla $ign) {Produced with Dr. Dre, Mike & Keys}

=== Curren$y and The Alchemist – Continuance ===
- Entire Album

=== Conway the Machine – God Don't Make Mistakes ===
- "Piano Love"
- "God Don't Make Mistakes" (featuring Annette Price) {produced with Swarvy}

=== The Alchemist – Craft Singles (45 Vinyl Series) ===
- Kool G Rap – "Diesel"

=== Benny the Butcher – Tana Talk 4 ===
- "Johnny P's Caddy" (featuring J. Cole)
- "Super Plug"
- "Weekend in the Perry's" (featuring Boldy James)
- "Thowy's Revenge"
- "Billy Joe"
- "Bust a Brick Nick"
- "Mr. Chow Hall"

=== Action Bronson – Cocodrillo Turbo ===
- "Estaciones" (featuring Hologram)
- "Jaws"
- "Subzero"

=== Armand Hammer – WHT LBL ===
- "Shellfish"
- "Resin"

=== Kendrick Lamar – Mr. Morale and the Big Steppers ===
- "We Cry Together" (featuring Taylour Paige)

=== Evidence ===
- "Nothing Stays in Las Vegas"

=== Rick Hyde – Stima ===
- "Poza" (featuring Rome Streetz)

=== Elucid – I Told Bessie ===
- "Nostrand" (featuring Billy Woods)

=== Roc Marciano and The Alchemist – The Elephant Man's Bones ===
- Entire Album

==== The Elephant Man's Bones: ALC Release 2020 ====
- "DNA"
- "Turkey Wings"

=== Black Soprano Family – Long Live DJ Shay ===
- "Pandemic Flow" - Rick Hyde, Conway The Machine, Cory Gunz

=== Freddie Gibbs – $oul $old $eperately ===
- "Blackest in the Room"

=== Cormega – The Realness II ===
- "Glorious" (featuring Nas)

=== Westside Gunn – 10 ===
- "Red Death" (featuring Griselda, Stove God Cooks, Rome Streetz, Armani Caeser, Jay Worthy and Robby Takac)

=== Rome Streetz – Kiss the Ring ===
- "Long Story Short"

== 2023 ==
=== Hit-Boy – SURF OR DROWN ===
- "Slipping Into Darkness" (with The Alchemist) {Produced with Hit-Boy}

=== Larry June and The Alchemist – The Great Escape ===
- Entire Album

=== Russ – CHOMP 2.5 ===
- "Easy"

=== The Alchemist – Flying High ===
- Entire EP

=== Travis Scott – Utopia ===
- "LOST FOREVER" (featuring Westside Gunn) {Produced with Travis Scott, James Blake and Dom Maker}

=== The Alchemist – Craft Singles (45 Vinyl Series) ===
- Vince Staples – "Lonnie P"
- Curren$y & The Alchemist – "No Yeast (Remix)" [featuring Westside Gunn and Boldy James]

=== Big Hit - The Truth Is in My Eyes ===
- Man, I'm Rollin'

=== BLK ODYSSY - Diamonds & Freaks ===
- "Judas and the Holy Mother of Stank" {Produced with BLK ODYSSEY}

=== Earl Sweatshirt and The Alchemist – Voir Dire ===
- Entire Album

=== – Voir Dire: Streaming Release ===
- "Heat Check"
- "Mancala" (featuring Vince Staples)
- "The Caliphate" (featuring Vince Staples)

=== Mike, Wiki & The Alchemist – Faith Is a Rock ===
- Entire Album

=== Maxo – DEBBIE'S SON ===
- "Another. Land"
- "Eyes on Me"

=== Danny Brown – Quaranta ===
- "Tantor"

=== The Alchemist ===
- "Nothing Is Freestyle"

=== The Alchemist – Flying High: Part Two ===
- Entire EP

=== Drake – For All the Dogs: Scary Hours Edition ===
- "Wick Man"

== 2024 ==
=== Courtney Bell & Royce da 5'9" - Microdose Darkside ===
- "Westside"

=== Benny the Butcher – Everybody Can't Go ===
- "Jermaine's Graduation"
- "Big Dog" (featuring Lil Wayne)
- "TMVTL"
- "Buffalo Kitchen Club" (featuring Armani Caesar)
- "Griselda Express" (featuring Westside Gunn, Conway the Machine and Rick Hyde)

=== Hit-Boy & The Alchemist – THEODORE & ANDRE ===
- "MORRISSEY"

=== ScHoolboy Q – Blue Lips ===
- "Lost Times" (featuring Jozzy) {Produced with DJ Fu}

=== Chuck Strangers – A Forsaken Lover's Plea ===
- "Sermonette"
- "Ski'd Up"

=== Roc Marciano – MARCIOLOGY ===
- "Bad Juju" (featuring Larry June)
- "Higher Self" (featuring T.F and Flee Lord)

=== J. Cole – Might Delete Later ===
- Stickz N Stonez {Produced with Billa Joints}

=== Gangrene - Heads I Win, Tails You Lose ===
- Dinosaur Jr.
- The Gates of Hell (featuring ANKHLEJOHN)
- Free Money Interlude
- Espionage
- Magic Dust (featuring Evidence) {Produced with A.J. Hall}
- Just Doing Art (featuring Boldy James)
- Royal hand
- Muffler Lung

=== Kendrick Lamar ===
- "Meet the Grahams"

=== Conway the Machine – SFK ===
- "The Red Moon in Osaka" (featuring Raekwon)

=== Big Hit, Hit-Boy & The Alchemist - Black & Whites ===
- Drug Tzar
- Heartless {Produced with Hit-Boy}
- Foreclosure {Produced with Hit-Boy}
- Temperature Check
- Champion
- Dirtball

=== Action Bronson - JOHANN SEBASTIAN BACHLAVA THE DOCTOR ===
- Sega
- Citrus Wahoo (featuring Meyhem Lauren)
- NBA Leather on NBC

=== Boldy James & The Alchemist ===
- "Ten Pints"

=== Big Sean - Better Me Than You ===
- Together Forever {Bonus Track}

=== A$AP Rocky - Don't Be Dumb ===
- Ruby Rosary (featuring J. Cole)

=== The Alchemist – The Genuine Articulate ===
- Entire EP

=== The Alchemist ===
- "Floppy Discs"

=== Roc Marciano & The Alchemist – The Skeleton Key ===
- Entire Album

== 2025 ==
=== Larry June, 2 Chainz & The Alchemist – Life Is Beautiful ===
- Entire Album

=== Zelooperz & Real Bad Man - Dear Psilocybin ===
- "In the Wind" (featuring The Alchemist)

=== The High & Mighty - The Sound of Market ===
- "Rose Bowl" (featuring Your Old Droog)

=== Fly Anakin - This Forever Dream ===
- "Corner Pocket" (featuring Quelle Chris and The Alchemist)

=== billy woods. - GOLLIWOG ===
- "Counterclockwise"

=== Erykah Badu ===
- "Next to You" (with The Alchemist)

=== Freddie Gibbs & The Alchemist – Alfredo 2 ===
- Entire Album

=== Evidence - Unlearning, Volume 2 ===
- "Memories" (featuring Larry June)
- "Define Success"
- "Rain Every Season" (featuring The Alchemist)
- "Laughing Last"

=== Jay Worthy - Once Upon a Time ===
- "The Outcome" (featuring The Alchemist, Westside Gunn, Dave East, and Ab-Soul)

=== Mobb Deep - Infinite ===
- "Gunfire"
- "Taj Mahal"
- "Score Points"
- "My Era"

=== Armand Hammer & The Alchemist - Mercy ===
- Entire Album

== 2026 ==
Before The World Blows- Erykah Badu & The Alchemist

(Entire Album ) August 28th release date
