= Raw Forever =

Compilation album by Cormega
- Released: September 27, 2011
- Recorded: 2010–2011
- Genre: East Coast hip hop
- Length: 1:17:40
- Label: Aura Records
- Producers: Nashiem Myrick; Dave Atkinson; Jae Supreme; Havoc; Big Ty; Spunk Bigga; DR Period; Hangmen 3; DJ Premier; Large Professor; Sha Money XL

Cormega chronology
Born and Raised (2009)	Raw Forever (2011)	Mega Philosophy (2014)

Raw Forever is the second compilation album by American rapper Cormega. It was released on September 27, 2011, under Aura Records. The first disc is a collection of Cormega' biggest hits and most well-known songs, the second disc consists of 11 new remixes recorded with live instrumentation performed by the band The Revelations.

== Track listing ==
By iTunes.

Disc One
No.	Title	Producer(s)	Length
1.	"Love Is Love" (from The Testament)	Nashiem Myrick	4:40
2.	"Testament" (from The Testament)	Dave Atkinson	3:55
3.	"Dead Man Walking" (from The Testament)	Jae Supreme	2:09
4.	"Killaz Theme" (featuring Mobb Deep, from The Testament)	Havoc	3:43
5.	"The Saga" (from The Realness)	Big Ty	4:00
6.	"They Forced My Hand" (featuring Tragedy Khadafi, from The Realness)	Spunk Bigga	4:13
7.	"True Meaning" (from The True Meaning)	DR Period	3:51
8.	"Verbal Graffiti" (from The True Meaning)	Hangmen 3	2:46
9.	"Dirty Game" (from Born and Raised)	DJ Premier	4:00
10.	"Journey" (from Born and Raised)	Large Professor	3:11
11.	"Get Out My Way" (from The Realness)	Sha Money XL	4:29

Disc Two
No.	Title	Length
1.	"I"	2:54
2.	"II"	1:18
3.	"III" (featuring Lil' Fame and Baby Pun)	3:58
4.	"IV"	3:11
5.	"V"	1:45
6.	"VI" (featuring AZ and Nature)	2:52
7.	"VII" (featuring Blaq Poet, Tragedy Khadafi and Havoc)	3:59
8.	"VIII" (featuring Red Alert, Parrish Smith, Grand Puba, KRS-One and Big Daddy Kane)	5:04
9.	"IX"	3:36
10.	"X" (instrumental)	2:36
11.	"XI" (instrumental)	5:40
Total length:		1:17:40
