= Ayatollah (music producer) =

American hip-hop musician and producer (born 1971)

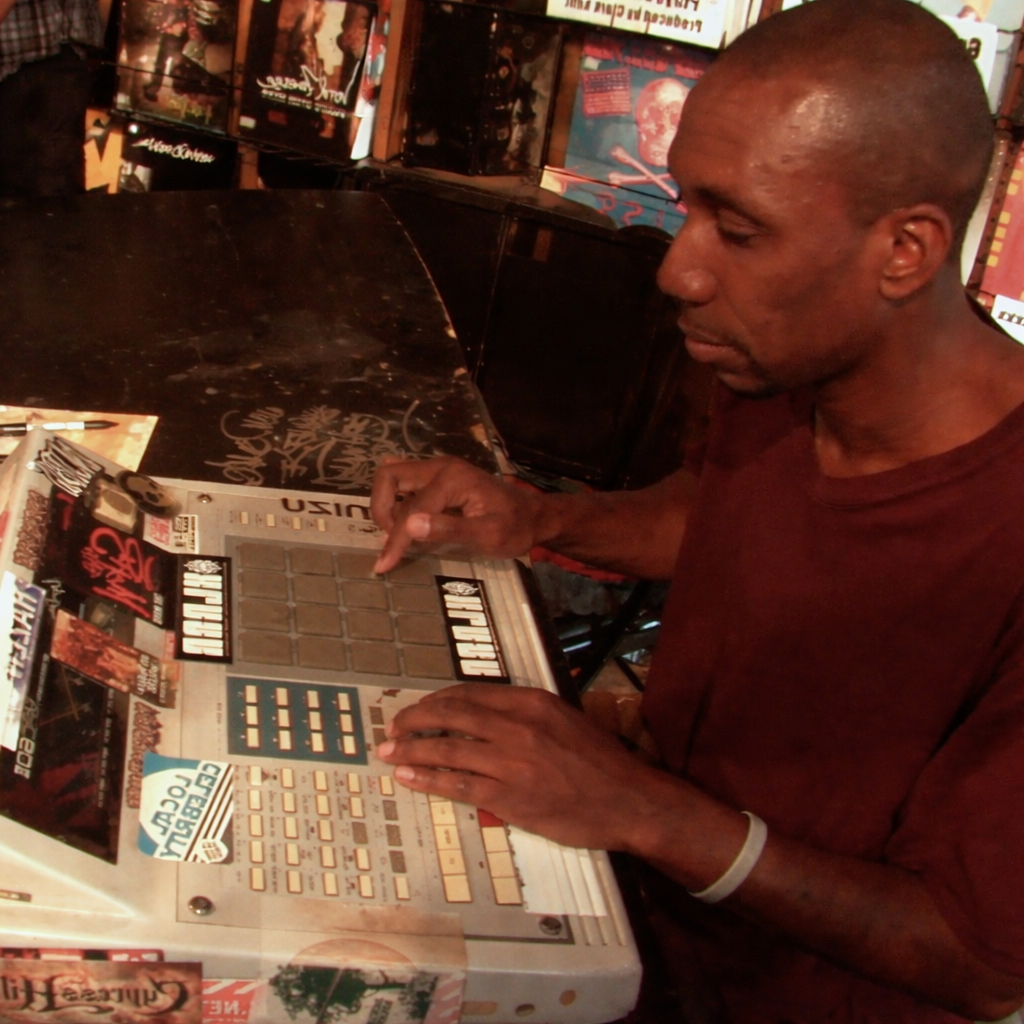
- Ayatollah in 2024

Background information
- Born: Lamont Dorrell; Jamaica, Queens, New York, U.S.
- Genres: Hip-hop; East Coast hip-hop; boom bap; jazz rap
- Occupations: Record producer; disc jockey
- Years active: 1998–present
- Labels: Rawkus; Nature Sounds
- Formerly of: Collosus; Box Cutter Brothers

Lamont Dorrell, known as Ayatollah, is an American hip-hop record producer from Jamaica, Queens, New York. He has mainly produced music for New York–based rappers, including Mos Def, Talib Kweli, Cormega, Styles P, Pharoahe Monch, Masta Ace, Sean Price, Smif-N-Wessun, Inspectah Deck, Ghostface Killah, Rakim, R.A. the Rugged Man, Tragedy Khadafi, Wordsworth, Vast Aire, Afu-Ra, Guru, Killah Priest, Ill Bill, Capone-N-Noreaga, Sadat X, Screwball, and Q-Unique.

== Career ==
Ayatollah first received mainstream recognition after producing Rawkus rapper Mos Def's 1999 single "Ms. Fat Booty", the first off his Black on Both Sides album. He went on to produce Cormega's "Rap's a Hustle", from the 2001 album The Realness, and Styles P's "The Life", featuring Pharoahe Monch (2002), among others. He also produced multiple tracks on Screwball's 2001 album, Loyalty, as well as Inspectah Deck's 2003 album, The Movement.

Ayatollah has released numerous solo albums, starting with his 2003 debut, So Many Reasons to Rhyme. In 2006, he issued Listen and Now Playing. The track "Hold U", from Now Playing, originally appeared on Masta Ace's 2001 album, Disposable Arts. He released Louder in 2007, followed by Drum Machine in 2008. He published three more albums in 2010, followed by Fingertips in 2011.

In 2012, he released a collaborative album with the Canadian rapper Moka Only, titled Bridges. In 2013, he issued the album Avant Garde, followed in 2014 by Be Real Black for Me. In 2015, he formed a trio named Colossus with the hip-hop production team Widowmaker. Their debut instrumental album, Ayatollah Presents: Colossus, was released digitally in June of that year, and a limited vinyl pressing was issued in mid-August. From 2015 to 2018, he issued multiple collaborative albums with Drasar Monumental as the Box Cutter Brothers.

== Discography ==
=== Albums ===
- So Many Reasons to Rhyme (2003)
- Personal Legend Vol. 1 (2003)
- Listen (2006)
- Now Playing (2006)
- Louder (2007)
- Drum Machine (2008)
- The Quixotic (2010)
- The Quixotic Remix EP (2010)
- Cocoon (2010)
- Live from the MPC 60 (2010)
- Fingertips (2011)
- Bridges (with Moka Only) (2012)
- Avant Garde (2013)
- Be Real Black for Me (2014)
- Who Is My Soul Brother? (2015)
- Wendee (2015)
- Ayatollah Presents: COLOSSUS (with Widowmaker) (2015)
- The Box Cutter Brothers (with Drasar Monumental) (2015)
- Box Cutter Brothers II (with Drasar Monumental) (2015)
- Weapons of Mass Production: Episode 1 (with Budget Money) (2016)
- Blaxplotiation: A Piece of the Action (with Hell Razah) (2017)
- Box Cutter Brothers – B.C.B. 4 (with Drasar Monumental) (2017)
- Box Cutter Brothers – 5 (with Drasar Monumental) (2018)
- Karmic Points (2018)
- Phantom of the Chakras (2018)
- The House of Trapdoors (with Bin Grim) (2023)
- Dekonstruktion of the Mind (with Okai) (2025)

=== Production credits ===
- Mos Def – "Ms. Fat Booty", "Know That" (featuring Talib Kweli) (Black on Both Sides, 1999)
- Mos Def & Ghostface Killah – "Ms. Fat Booty 2" (Lyricist Lounge 2, 2000)
- Cella Dwellas – "Game of Death" (The Last Shall Be First, 2000)
- Guru – "Cry" (Baldhead Slick & Da Click, 2001)
- Tragedy Khadafi – "Lift Ya Glass" (Against All Odds, 2001)
- Masta Ace – "Hold U" (featuring Jean Grae) (Disposable Arts, 2001)
- Truth Enola – "No Matter What They Say" (2001)
- Screwball – 5 tracks (Loyalty, 2001)
- Cormega – "Rap's a Hustle" (The Realness, 2001)
- Afu-Ra – "Think Before You..." (featuring Jahdan Blakkamoore) (Life Force Radio, 2002)
- Royce Da 5'9" – "Life" (featuring Amerie) (Rock City, 2002)
- Styles P (featuring Pharoahe Monch) – "The Life" (Soundbombing III / A Gangster and a Gentleman, 2002)
- Talib Kweli – "Joy" (featuring Mos Def), "The Proud" (Quality, 2002)
- The High & Mighty – "You Don't Wanna Fuck With" (featuring R.A. the Rugged Man & Havoc) (Air Force 1, 2002)
- Inspectah Deck – 6 tracks (The Movement, 2003)
- R.A. the Rugged Man – "Chains" (featuring Masta Killa & Killah Priest), "Make Luv Outro" (Die Rugged Man Die, 2004)
- Wordsworth – "Right Now", "Evol" (featuring Justin Time & Masta Ace) (Mirror Music, 2004)
- Cormega – "Bring it Back" (Legal Hustle, 2004)
- Vast Aire – "Elixir" (featuring Sadat X and Sinclair) (Look Mom... No Hands, 2004)
- Tragedy Khadafi – "No Equivalent" (Thug Matrix, 2005)
- Sean Price – "Spliff N Wessun" (featuring Ruste Juxx) (Monkey Barz, 2005)
- Sadat X – "Throw tha Ball" (Black October, 2006)
- R.A. the Rugged Man – "Windows of the World" (Legendary Classics, 2009)
- Cormega – "Rapture" (Born and Raised, (2009)
- Ill Bill – "L'Amour East" (The Grimey Awards, 2013)
- Killah Priest – "Super God" (The Psychic World of Walter Reed) (2013)
- Capone-N-Noreaga – "Future", "Not Stick You Pt. 2" (feat. Tragedy Khadafi) (Lessons, 2015)
