= Thug Matrix =

Studio album by Tragedy Khadafi
- Released: October 4, 2005
- Genre: East Coast hip hop
- Label: FastLife Music
- Producer: Havoc; Scram Jones; Now & Laterz; The Alchemist; Ayatollah; Star Blaze; Simon Wolf; Asmatik; Yatzee; Dams

Tragedy Khadafi chronology
Black Market Militia (2005)	Thug Matrix (2005)	Blood Ballads (2006)

Singles from Thug Matrix
- 1. "Break Bread" Released: September 20, 2005

Professional ratings
Review scores
Source	Rating
AllHipHop	3.5/5 stars
RapReviews	7/10

Thug Matrix is the fifth studio album by the American hip hop musician Tragedy Khadafi, released in 2005. Havoc and Raekwon make guest appearances on the album.

== Track listing ==
#	Title	Performer(s)	Producer(s)	Time
1	"Intro"	Tragedy Khadafi	-	1:59
2	"The Game"	Tragedy Khadafi, Havoc	Havoc	5:07
3	"Break Bread"	Tragedy Khadafi, Cormega	Now & Laterz	4:12
4	"Gorilla Rap"	Tragedy Khadafi, Raekwon	Scram Jones	2:57
5	"On Grind"	Tragedy Khadafi, Nature, Littles	Scram Jones	3:52
6	"Love Is Love"	Tragedy Khadafi, Jinx	The Alchemist	3:36
7	"No Equivalent"	Tragedy Khadafi, Cormega	Ayatollah	2:31
8	"Stay Free"	Tragedy Khadafi, Littles	The Alchemist	4:05
9	"Salute"	Tragedy Khadafi	Now & Laterz	2:54
10	"I Don't Wanna Live No More"	Tragedy Khadafi, Star Blaze	Star Blaze	4:16
11	"Aura"	Tragedy Khadafi, Lady Repo	Simon Wolf	2:16
12	"Lyrical Calisthenics"	Tragedy Khadafi	Asmatik	4:37
13	"Straight Death"	Tragedy Khadafi	Yatzee	5:29
14	"Blinded By Science"	Tragedy Khadafi, Havoc	Dams	2:27
