= Tragedy (disambiguation) =

Tragedy is a genre of drama.

Tragedy may also refer to:

== Film and television ==
- Tragedy (1925 film), a German silent drama film
- Tragedy (1985 film), or Surviving: A Family in Crisis, an American TV movie
- Tragedy: The Story of Queensbridge, a 2005 American documentary film
- "Tragedy" (Law & Order: Special Victims Unit), a 2003 TV episode
- "Chapter 14: The Tragedy", a 2020 episode of The Mandalorian

== Music ==
=== Performers ===
- Tragedy (band), an American punk band
- Tragedy Khadafi (born 1971), American rapper
- Tragedy, a heavy metal Bee Gees tribute band; see Corn Mo

=== Albums ===
- Tragedy (Forever Storm album) or the title song, 2013
- Tragedy (Julia Holter album), 2011
- Tragedy: Saga of a Hoodlum, by Intelligent Hoodlum (Tragedy Khadafi), 1993
- Tragedy +, by Snot, 2020
- Tragedies (album), by Funeral, 1995

=== Songs ===
- "Tragedy" (Bee Gees song), 1979; covered by Steps, 1998
- "Tragedy" (Hanoi Rocks song), 1981
- "Tragedy" (KAT-TUN song), 2016
- "Tragedy" (Thomas Wayne song), 1959
- "Tragedy", by Argent from All Together Now, 1972
- "Tragedy", by the Bats from Daddy's Highway, 1987
- "Tragedy", by Marc Anthony from Mended, 2002
- "The Tragedy", by Jeremih and Chance the Rapper from Merry Christmas Lil' Mama, 2016

== Other uses ==
- Tragedy (event), one or more deaths that bring grief to society
- The Tragedy (Picasso), a 1903 painting by Pablo Picasso
- Melpomene, Muse of Tragedy
