= Tragic (disambiguation) =

A tragic story, or tragedy, is a genre of drama.

Tragic may also refer to:

- Tragic (album), by Orange 9mm, or the title song, 1996
- "Tragic" (song), by Kid Laroi, 2020
- "Tragic", a song by Jazmine Sullivan, 2121

== See also ==
- Tragedy (disambiguation)
