= Tragedy: The Story of Queensbridge =

2005 film directed by Booker Sim

- DVD cover
- Directed by: Booker Sim
- Written by: Booker Sim
- Produced by: Malcolm Hearn, Tragedy Khadafi, Booker Sim, Poppa Mobb and Uncle La
- Starring: Tragedy Khadafi; Havoc; Prodigy; Capone; N.O.R.E. Marley Marl; Killa Sha; Blaq Poet; Poppa Mobb; Uncle La; Mike Delorean
- Edited by: Malcolm Hearn
- Music by: Tragedy Khadafi
- Release date: January 23, 2005 (Slamdance Film Festival)
- Running time: 73 minutes
- Country: United States
- Language: English

Tragedy: The Story of Queensbridge is a 2005 documentary film directed by Booker Sim for Juju Films. The film documents the streets of the Queensbridge Housing Projects of New York City, following the issues and struggles of Tragedy Khadafi aka Intelligent Hoodlum. Queens rappers Havoc, Prodigy (both from the group Mobb Deep), Capone and N.O.R.E. (both from Capone-N-Noreaga), as well as producer Marley Marl among others appeared in the film.

== Reception ==
At the review aggregator site Rotten Tomatoes, the film averaged an 80% approval rate. At the Internet Movie Database, 27 users gave a 7'8/10 media rating to the film.
