= The Realness II =

Studio album by Cormega
- Released: October 7, 2022
- Genre: Hip hop
- Length: 33:41
- Label: Cormega LLC
- Producer: Large Professor; Havoc; The Alchemist; Sha Money XL; Harry Fraud

Cormega chronology
Mega Philosophy (2011)	The Realness II (2022)

Singles from The Realness II
- 1. "Essential" Released: August 12, 2022

The Realness II is the sixth studio album by American rapper Cormega. It was released on October 7, 2022, serving as a sequel to his 2001 debut, The Realness. The album was first announced in the summer of 2022, with the lead single, "Essential," released on August 12, 2022.

The album features guest appearances from Nas, Lloyd Banks and Havoc of Mobb Deep.

== Track listing ==
No.	Title	Producer(s)	Length
1.	"Once and for All"	Domingo	1:56
2.	"Her Name"	Pops	2:58
3.	"Glorious" (featuring Nas)	The Alchemist	3:10
4.	"The Saga Resumes"	Big Ty	2:57
5.	"What's Understood"	Cormega, Sha Money XL	2:57
6.	"Life and Rhymes"	Large Professor	2:27
7.	"Grand Scheme" (featuring Lloyd Banks)	StreetRunner, Tarik Azzouz	2:42
8.	"White Roses"	Sha Money XL	2:20
9.	"Essential"	Havoc	3:05
10.	"This Life of Ours"	Camondatrack	3:06
11.	"Age of Wisdom"	Cormega	1:03
12.	"Paradise" (featuring Havoc)	StreetRunner, Tarik Azzouz	2:18
13.	"Man vs. Myth" (narrated by Russell Simmons)	Harry Fraud	2:36
Total length:			33:41
