= Still Reportin'... =

Studio album by Tragedy Khadafi
- Released: October 21, 2003
- Studio: In Ya Ear Studios (Long Island, NY)
- Genre: Hip-hop
- Length: 57:45
- Label: 25 To Life; Solid
- Producer: Ben Grimm; Booth; Dart La; Just One; Scram Jones; Sha Self

Tragedy Khadafi chronology
Against All Odds (2001)	Still Reportin'... (2003)	Black Market Militia (2005)

Singles from Still Reportin'...
- 1. "Stay Free" Released: September 9, 2002; 2. "U Make Me" Released: April 22, 2003; 3. "Hood" Released: November 11, 2003

Professional ratings
Review scores
Source	Rating
AllMusic	4/5 stars
Prefix	6/10
RapReviews	7/10

Still Reportin'... is the fourth solo studio album by American rapper Tragedy Khadafi. It was released on October 21, 2003 via 25 to Life/Solid Records. Recording sessions took place at In Ya Ear Studios in Long Island City. Production was handled by Booth, Scram Jones, Ben Grimm, Dart La, Just One and Sha Money XL. It features guest appearances from Christ Castro, Havoc, Littles, V-12, Capone and Rashida Rohan. The album peaked at number 53 on the Top R&B/Hip-Hop Albums chart in the United States. Its single "Hood" made it to number 70 on the Hot R&B/Hip-Hop Singles Sales chart.

== Track listing ==
No.	Title	Writer(s)	Producer(s)	Length
1.	"Still Reporting"	Percy Lee Chapman; Andrew Kissle	Booth	3:02
2.	"Neva Die Alone, Pt. 2"	P. Chapman; Marc Shemer	Scram Jones	3:50
3.	"The Code" (featuring Havoc and Littles)	P. Chapman; Kejuan Muchita; Alfredo Bryan; Shemer	Scram Jones	4:14
4.	"Hood" (featuring Christ Castro)	P. Chapman; C. Chapman; John Parker	Dart La	4:45
5.	"Hood Love" (featuring Rashida)	P. Chapman; Kissle	Booth	3:39
6.	"The Message (Aura Check)"	P. Chapman; Kissle	Booth	3:55
7.	"Wake the Dead (Black Aura Skit)"		Booth	1:14
8.	"Walk Wit Me (911)"	P. Chapman; Michael J. Clervoix	Sha-Self	6:01
9.	"U Make Me" (featuring Capone, Littles and V-12)	P. Chapman; Kiam Holley; Bryan; Shaun Walker; Benjamin Vargas	Ben Grimm	3:57
10.	"The Truth" (featuring Christ Castro)	P. Chapman; C. Chapman; J. Miller	Just One	3:40
11.	"Fall Back" (featuring Havoc)	P. Chapman; Muchita; Shemer	Scram Jones	3:51
12.	"Can't Figure" (featuring V-12)	P. Chapman; Vargas	Ben Grimm	4:15
13.	"Eloheem"	P. Chapman; Parker	Dart La	2:12
14.	"Crying on the Inside"	P. Chapman; Shemer	Scram Jones	5:23
15.	Untitled		Scram Jones	3:47
Total length:				57:45

== Charts ==
Chart (2003)	Peak position
US Top R&B/Hip-Hop Albums (Billboard)	53
