= Born and Raised (Cormega album) =

Studio album by Cormega
- Released: October 20, 2009
- Recorded: 2006–2009
- Genre: East Coast hip hop
- Length: 43:03
- Label: Aura Records
- Producer: Large Professor; L.E.S.; Easy Mo Bee; DJ Premier; Lil' Fame; Pete Rock; Nottz; Ayatollah; Havoc; Buckwild; DR Period; Khrysis

Cormega chronology
The Testament (2005)	Born and Raised (2009)	Raw Forever (2011)

Professional ratings
Review scores
Source	Rating
AllHipHop	7/10 stars
AllMusic	4/5 stars
HipHopDX	4/5 stars
RapReviews	8.5/10 stars

Born and Raised is the fourth studio album by Queensbridge rapper Cormega. It was released on October 20, 2009, after being pushed back several times; the album was originally to be titled Urban Legend but was changed to Born and Raised after rapper T.I. used the original title for his 2004 release (Cormega mentions this on his Who Am I DVD of video of him circa 2003). The album was met with mostly positive reviews from both fans and critics.

The song "Fresh", featuring Big Daddy Kane, KRS-One, Grand Puba, PMD and DJ Red Alert was leaked onto the internet in the middle of 2008. This caused Cormega to replace the original version, produced by Emile, with a remix by Buckwild re-titled as "Mega Fresh X" for the retail album.

== Track listing ==
No.	Title	Producer(s)	Length
1.	"Prelude" (featuring Marley Marl) / "Intro (The 3rd Coming)"	Khrysis, Cormega^{[a]} Bear One	2:34
2.	"Girl"	L.E.S., Cormega^{[a]}	2:56
3.	"Love Your Family" (featuring Havoc)	Havoc	3:54
4.	"Get It In" (featuring Lil' Fame)	Easy Mo Bee	3:12
5.	"The Other Side"	Fizzy Womack, Cormega^{[a]}	3:01
6.	"Live and Learn"	Pete Rock	2:58
7.	"Make It Clear"	DJ Premier	3:03
8.	"Journey"	Large Professor	3:12
9.	"Define Yourself" (featuring Tragedy Khadafi and Havoc)	DR Period	2:51
10.	"What Did I Do"	Nottz	2:52
11.	"Dirty Game"	DJ Premier	4:01
12.	"One Purpose"		0:40
13.	"Rapture"	Ayatollah	2:54
14.	"Mega Fresh X" (featuring DJ Red Alert, Parrish Smith, Grand Puba, KRS-One and Big Daddy Kane)	Buckwild	4:54
Total length:			43:03

Notes

- ^{^a} signifies a co-producer

== Samples ==
- "Dirty Game"
  - "Once Upon a Time (You Were a Friend of Mine)" by Barry White
- "Rapture"
  - "Mother's Theme (Mama)" by Willie Hutch
  - "Size 'Em Up" by Big L
- "Define Yourself"
  - "Go On and Cry" by Les McCann
- "Love Your Family"
  - "The Best of My Love" by T-Connection
- "What Did I Do"
  - "You're Making a Big Mistake" by The Hitchhikers
- "Girl"
  - "Gina's and Elvira's Theme" by Giorgio Moroder (performed by Helen St. John)
- "Journee"
  - "Good Inside" by Bobby Lyle
- "Make It Clear"
  - "I Can't Live Without Your Love" by Teddy Pendergrass
- "Mega Fresh X"
  - "9mm Goes Bang" by Boogie Down Productions
- "Live and Learn"
  - "What More Can a Girl Ask For" by The Whispers

== Charts ==
Chart (2009)	Peak position
US Top R&B/Hip-Hop Albums (Billboard)	56
