= Nas & Ill Will Records Presents QB's Finest =

Nas & Ill Will Records Presents QB Finest

Compilation album by QB Finest
- Released: November 21, 2000
- Recorded: 1999–2000
- Genre: Hip hop
- Length: 66:02
- Label: Ill Will; Columbia
- Producer: Al West; The Alchemist; Ez Elpee; Havoc; The Infinite Arkatechz; L.E.S.; Marley Marl; Plain Truth; Scott Storch

Singles from Nas & Ill Will Records Presents QB Finest
- 1. "Da Bridge 2001" Released: 2000; 2. "Oochie Wally" Released: January 6, 2001

Professional ratings
Review scores
Source	Rating
Allmusic	2/5 stars
The Source	3.5/5 stars

Nas & Ill Will Records Presents QB's Finest, commonly known as simply QB's Finest, is a compilation album released on November 21, 2000, and the second release from rapper Nas' new Ill Will Records imprint, distributed by Columbia Records. It featured Nas and a number of other rappers from the Queensbridge housing projects, including Mobb Deep, Nature, Nashawn, Littles, Bravehearts and Cormega, who had briefly reconciled a longtime feud with Nas.

The album also featured guest appearances from Queensbridge's hip hop legends Roxanne Shanté, MC Shan and Marley Marl, both of whom appeared on the lead single "Da Bridge 2001" (based on MC Shan's and Marley Marl's 1986 classic "The Bridge"). "Da Bridge 2001" also featured a response from Nas to Memphis Bleek, in which Nas calls out most of the Roc-A-Fella Records roster, including Memphis Bleek, Damon Dash, Beanie Sigel and Jay-Z. The album's biggest hit single was "Oochie Wally", a club anthem recorded by the Bravehearts.

== Track listing ==
No.	Title	Writer(s)	Producer(s)	Length
1.	"Intro" (performed by Jungle and Wiz)	Jabari Jones; Mike Epps	L.E.S.	2:03
2.	"Da Bridge 2001" (performed by Nas, Capone, Mobb Deep, Tragedy, Nature, MC Shan, Marley Marl, Cormega and Millennium Thug)	Nasir Jones; Kiam Holley; Kejuan Muchita; Nashawn Jones; Percy Lee Chapman; Jermaine Baxter; Corey McKay; Leshan Lewis; Shawn Moltke; Marlon Williams; Albert Johnson	L.E.S.; Nas (co.)	4:32
3.	"We Live This" (performed by Havoc, Big Noyd and Shanté)	Nasir Jones; Muchita; TaJuan Perry	Havoc	4:08
4.	"Real Niggas" (performed by Nas and Ruc)	Nasir Jones; Naquan White; Lewis	L.E.S.; Nas	4:39
5.	"Find Ya Wealth" (performed by Nas)	Nasir Jones; Lewis; Brian Bennett	L.E.S.; Nas	3:40
6.	"Straight Outta Q.B." (performed by Jungle, Cormega and Poet)	Jabari Jones; C. McKay; Wilbur Bass; Lewis; Lorenzo Patterson; Eric Wright; Andre Young; O'Shea Jackson; Clarence Haskins; Calvin Simon; Grady Thomas; Michael Williams	L.E.S.; Cormega (co.)	3:55
7.	"Oochie Wally" (remix) (performed by Nas and Bravehearts)	Nasir Jones; Lamont Porter; Jabari Jones; Eugene Gray; Epps	EZ Elpee	4:00
8.	"Our Way" (performed by Capone-N-Noreaga and Imam Thug)	Scott Storch; Holley; Victor Santiago; Michael Butler	Scott Storch	4:47
9.	"Fire" (performed by Nature)	Baxter; Lewis	L.E.S.	3:39
10.	"Power Rap" (freestyle interlude) (performed by Prodigy)	Muchita; Johnson	Havoc	2:30
11.	"Street Glory" (performed by Nas and Pop)	Nasir Jones; Lewis; Vincent Turner	L.E.S.	3:30
12.	"We Break Bread" (performed by Lord Black, Littles, Craig G and Chaos)	Lafonzo Benjamin; Alfredo Bryan; Lionel Cooper; Craig Curry; Larry Gates; Lewis; David Pickney	L.E.S.; Precision	4:43
13.	"Money" (performed by Mr. Challish)	Alan Maman; Lamont Mena	Alchemist	4:03
14.	"Self Conscience" (performed by Prodigy and Nas)	Nasir Jones; Johnson; Michael Dewar; Collin Dewar	The Infinite Arkatechz	3:15
15.	"Die 4" (performed by Infamous Mobb)	Cooper; James Chandler; Jamal Abdul Raheem; Sheldon K. Goode	Plain Truth	4:01
16.	"Kids in da P.J.'s" (performed by Nas, Bravehearts and Millennium Thug)	Nasir Jones; Jabari Jones; Gray; Epps; Nashawn Jones; C. Dewar; M. Dewar; Sean Baker; Chris Spheeris	The Infinite Arkatechz	4:35
17.	"Teenage Thug" (bonus track) (performed by Nas and Millennium Thug)	Nasir Jones; Nashawn Jones; Al West	Al West	4:02
Total length:				66:02

Though numbered correctly in the liner notes, the original compact disc pressing erroneously combined tracks one and two during mastering, throwing off the count for the rest of the tracks by one number (i.e., "We Live This" is track two, "Real Niggas" is track three, and so on). Later, corrected masters feature the "Oochie Wally" remix (which features Nas in addition to the Bravehearts) in place of the original.

Samples

- "Da Bridge 2001" contains a sample from "The Bridge", written by Marlon Williams and Shawn Moltke, and performed by MC Shan.
- "Find Ya Wealth" contains samples from "Solstice", written and performed by Brian Bennett.
- "Straight Outta Q.B." contains samples from:
  - "You'll Like It Too"; written by Clarence Haskins, Grady Thomas, Calvin Simon, and Michael Williams; and performed by Connections & Disconnections.
  - "Straight Outta Compton"; written by Lorenzo Patterson, Eric Wright, Andre Young, and O'Shea Jackson; and performed by N.W.A.
- "Kids in da PJ's" contains a sample from "The Gathering", written and performed by Chris Spheeris.

== Charts ==
=== Weekly charts ===
Chart (2001)	Peak position
US Billboard 200	53
US Top R&B/Hip-Hop Albums (Billboard)	10

=== Year-end charts ===
Chart (2001)	Position
US Billboard 200	166
US Top R&B/Hip-Hop Albums (Billboard)	55

== Singles chart positions ==
Year	Song	Chart positions				
Year	Song	Billboard Hot 100	Hot R&B/Hip-Hop Singles & Tracks	Hot Rap Singles	Rhythmic Top 40	Top 40 Tracks
2001	Da Bridge 2001	-	-	#17	-	-
2001	Oochie Wally	#26	#11	#2	#6	#36

== Certifications ==
Region	Certification	Certified units/sales
United States (RIAA)	Gold	500,000^{^}
^{^} Shipments figures based on certification alone.
