= Legal Hustle =

Compilation album by Cormega
- Released: May 25, 2004
- Recorded: 2003–2004
- Genre: Hip hop
- Length: 59:00
- Label: Koch
- Producer: Cormega; Ayatollah; Ax (The Bull); The Feil Brothers; Emile; Ill Will Fulton; J. Waxx Garfield; Jae Supreme; Spunk Bigga; Maki; J-Love

Cormega chronology
The True Meaning (2002)	Legal Hustle (2004)	The Testament (2005)

Singles from Legal Hustle
- 1. "Let It Go" Released: April 13, 2004; 2. "Dangerous" Released: June 28, 2004

Professional ratings
Review scores
Source	Rating
Allmusic	3/5 stars
RapReviews.com	8.0/10

Legal Hustle is the debut compilation album by American rapper Cormega. It was released on May 25, 2004, through Koch Records. It was supported by two singles: "Let It Go", which features M.O.P. and "Dangerous", which features Unda P. and Vybz Kartel.

The album features guest appearances from various Cormega labelmates as well as more popular rappers such as Ghostface Killah, Large Professor, AZ, Kurupt, Jayo Felony, The Jacka and others.

== Track listing ==
No.	Title	Producer(s)	Length
1.	"Intro" (featuring Doña and Miz)	Ax (The Bull), The Feil Brothers, Cormega (co-producer)	2:50
2.	"Beautiful Mind"	Cormega, Jae Supreme	2:40
3.	"Let It Go" (featuring M.O.P.)	Emile	5:37
4.	"The Bond" (featuring Doña)	Ax (The Bull)	3:13
5.	"Bring It Back"	Ayatollah	2:46
6.	"Hoody" (featuring Doña)	Cormega	2:12
7.	"Dangerous" (featuring Unda P. and Vybz Kartel)	Ill Will Fulton, J. Waxx Garfield	3:44
8.	"Tony/Montana" (featuring Ghostface Killah)	The Feil Brothers	3:35
9.	"Personified" (featuring Doña)	Spunk Bigga	3:26
10.	"Stay Up" (featuring Kira)	Cormega	4:20
11.	"Deep Blue Sea" (featuring Jayo Felony and Kurupt)	Emile	4:22
12.	"More Crime" (featuring The Jacka)	Maki	4:23
13.	"Monster's Ball" (featuring Banger, Lake and Maino)	Ax (The Bull)	3:31
14.	"Redemption" (featuring AZ)	Emile	3:36
15.	"Respect Me" (featuring Doña)	Ax (The Bull)	3:37
16.	"Sugar Ray and Hearns" (featuring Large Professor)	J-Love	1:54
17.	"The Machine" (featuring Doña and Miz)	Ax (The Bull)	3:14
Total length:			59:00

=== Sample credits ===
Sample credits adapted from WhoSampled.

- "Intro"
  - "We the People Who Are Darker Than Blue" by Curtis Mayfield
  - "Hold Me, Thrill Me, Kiss Me, Kill Me" by U2
- "Hoody"
  - "UFO" by ESG
- "Let It Go"
  - "Time" by Manfred Mann Chapter Three
- "Sugar Ray and Hearns"
  - "Do What He Wants" by Tessie Hill
- "Tony/Montana"
  - "Ships Ahoy!" by The O'Jays
- "Beautiful Mind"
  - "Ike's Mood I" by Isaac Hayes
- "Dangerous"
  - "Tempo" by Anthony Red Rose
  - "Dangerous" by Conroy Smith
- "Deep Blue Sea"
  - "Ain't No Love (Left in My Heart for You)" by High Inergy
- "More Crime"
  - "Winter Time'" by Steve Miller Band
- "Bring It Back"
  - "You've Lost That Lovin' Feelin'" by Isaac Hayes
- "Personified"
  - "I Wanna Write You a Long Song" by David Oliver
- "Stay Up"
  - "Love T.K.O." by Teddy Pendergrass
- "The Machine"
  - "Tu Y Yo" by Emmanuel

== Charts ==
Chart (2004)	Peak position
US Billboard 200	174
US Top R&B/Hip-Hop Albums (Billboard)	22
US Independent Albums (Billboard)	8
