= The Realness =

Studio album by Cormega
- Released: July 24, 2001
- Recorded: 2000–2001
- Genre: East Coast hip hop; hardcore hip hop
- Length: 49:43
- Label: Legal Hustle; LandSpeed
- Producer: Cormega; J-Love; Havoc; Big Ty; Jae-Supreme; Spank Brother; Ayatollah; Sha Money XL; Godfather Don; Spunk Bigga; The Alchemist

Cormega chronology
The Realness (2001)	The True Meaning (2002)

Singles from The Realness
- 1. "You Don't Want It" Released: 2000; 2. "Get Out My Way" Released: September 25, 2001

The Realness is the debut studio album by American rapper Cormega. It features guest appearances from Mobb Deep and Tragedy Khadafi, as well as production from Havoc of Mobb Deep, J-Love, and The Alchemist, among others. It was released via Legal Hustle Records and LandSpeed Records.

The Realness was re-released in 2007 with The True Meaning, Cormega's second album from 2002, in a double special-edition package. The album's sequel, The Realness II, was released on October 7, 2022.

== Background ==
Cormega rose to fame in the mid-90s as an original member of The Firm hip hop group, along with Nas, AZ and Foxy Brown, appearing on the song "Affirmative Action" from the Nas album It Was Written. After being booted from the group, Cormega signed a record deal with Def Jam Recordings, and recorded his first album The Testament. The album was eventually shelved, and Cormega was dropped from label, joining LandSpeed Records for his first official release.

== Critical reception ==
Professional ratings
Review scores
Source	Rating
AllMusic	4/5 stars
HipHopDX	4/5 stars
RapReviews	7/10
The Source	3.5/5 stars

The Realness received mostly positive reviews. J-23 of HipHopDX praised the album's production, calling it a "pleasant surprise". Matt Conaway of AllMusic stated that the album paints Cormega as "one of the most promising thug poets to emerge in quite sometime".

== Track listing ==
No.	Title	Producer(s)	Length
1.	"Dramatic Entrance"	J-Love	2:18
2.	"American Beauty"	Cormega	2:03
3.	"Thun & Kicko" (featuring Prodigy)	Havoc	3:56
4.	"The Saga"	Big Ty	4:00
5.	"R U My Nigga?"	Jae Supreme	3:18
6.	"Unforgiven"	Spank Brother	2:06
7.	"Fallen Soldiers"	J-love	3:39
8.	"Glory Days"	Jae Supreme	3:22
9.	"Rap's a Hustle"	Ayatollah	3:38
10.	"Get Out My Way"	Sha Money XL	4:29
11.	"You Don't Want It"	Godfather Don	2:56
12.	"5 for 40"		0:47
13.	"They Forced My Hand" (featuring Tragedy Khadafi)	Spunk Bigga	4:01
14.	"Fallen Soldiers (Remix)"	The Alchemist	4:27
15.	"Killaz Theme II (Hidden Track)" (featuring Mobb Deep)	Havoc	4:07
Total length:			49:43

Sample credits

- American Beauty
  - "I've Been Watching You" by Southside Movement
- R U My Nigga?
  - "Night Moves" by Frank McDonald
- Unforgiven'
  - "4th Movement: Passacaglia" by Yusef Lateef
- Rap's a Hustle
  - "I Choose You" by Willie Hutch
- Fallen Soldiers
  - "Beggar's Song" by Wet Willie
- They Forced My Hand
  - "Signal Your Intention" by Hodges, James and Smith
- Glory Days
  - "Each Day I Cry a Little" by Eddie Kendricks
- You Don't Want It
  - "Alone in the Ring" by Bill Conti
- Fallen Soldiers (Remix)
  - "Time" by Morning, Noon & Night

== Charts ==
Chart (2001)	Peak position
US Billboard 200	111
US Top R&B/Hip-Hop Albums (Billboard)	24
US Independent Albums (Billboard)	4

== Release history ==
Region	Date	Format(s)	Label
Various	2001	Cassette	LandSpeed
Various	2001	Vinyl	LandSpeed
Various	2001	CD	LandSpeed
Various	2014	Digital download	Slimstyle
Various	2014	Streaming	Slimstyle
