= Mega Philosophy =

Studio album by Cormega
- Released: July 22, 2014
- Recorded: 2013–2014
- Genre: Hip hop
- Length: 32:03
- Label: Slimstyle Records
- Producer: Large Professor

Cormega chronology
Raw Forever (2011)	Mega Philosophy (2014)	The Realness II (2022)

Singles from Mega Philosophy
- 1. "Industry" Released: May 18, 2014

Mega Philosophy is the fifth studio album by American rapper Cormega. The album was released on July 22, 2014 by Slimstyle Records. The entire album was produced by Large Professor. The album features guest appearances from Styles P, Black Rob, Maya Azucena, Redman, Raekwon, and The Firm members AZ and Nature.

== Background ==
In a July 2014, interview with XXL, Cormega and Large Professor spoke about why they decided to do an album together, saying: "[We first worked together] on The True Meaning, and it was an honor. And then we did something for Legal Hustle, the compilation I made, but he didn’t produce he just rapped on it, and that was fun. And then we did “Journey,” and that's the one that opened the fucking door to doing a whole album, because the feedback we got on that was phenomenal. Just out of nowhere he was like, “Yo, you know what? Let’s just start the album.” It's cool [to produce an entire record] because it's like a brotherhood almost. It's just like putting out to the world like, “Yo these guys really rock like that.” It's not just a one off where some dudes have questionable chemistry. It's like, “Yo these dudes really rock. They go on the road together and really do this.”

They also spoke about the creative process behind the album, saying: "We all get predictable sometimes, and I wanted to show real artistry and take creative risk and just do different shit with this album. I think I did it with the song “More;” I think I did it with “Industry.” “Rise” is a song I also think people wouldn't expect from me, so there's definitely some songs on it they wouldn't expect. The approach on this was different because Mega actually had a lot to do with the production. I was kind of giving him basic ideas; that's how I start anyway. I start to format it a certain way and then as we start to build it I add on to it. The process was definitely outside of anything I’ve ever done before. I'm pretty much always [in control]. Mega got a few of the sounds, like on the “Industry” song with the Lauryn Hill ad-lib. Mega put a lot into that kind of stuff. It's a challenge [to work with one producer for a whole album]. But, it's Large Professor; he's one of the greatest producers that's ever existed. It's not debatable. So when you get an opportunity with someone like that, you do it. He was gonna make me do things different than how I would normally do it. But I was welcome to the challenge, and I'm glad I did it."

== Critical reception ==
Professional ratings
Review scores
Source	Rating
HipHopDX	4/5 stars
XXL	4/5 (XL)

Mega Philosophy was met with generally positive reviews from music critics. Jesse Fairfax of HipHopDX said, "Clearly well thought out conceptually, one would be hard pressed to find a title more befitting than Mega Philosophy. Still embodying the knowledge of self associated with his career since 2001’s The Realness (long before Peter Rosenberg borrowed the term for daily gripe sessions on Hot 97), Cormega’s kingly stances are transparent at all times. Requiring just over 30 minutes to sit through, his important conviction repetitively preaches to the choir, but multiple plays will help digest the cerebral gems and complex syllables he puts to good use. Proving an ongoing chemistry with fellow everyman Large Professor, their synergy connects with the already wise while aiming to bridge gaps with the less developed." Barry Ward of XXL stated, "While at times Mega Philosophy gets a little too heavy-handed, it presents subject matters that should be addressed in this climate of mainstream dominance. Bringing hip-hop back to its true essence is a great mission, but sometimes it’s best to demonstrate what it sounds like than telling us about it. More often than not, Cormega simply shows ‘em how it’s done, making Mega Philosophy a class worth enrolling in."

== Track listing ==
- All songs produced by Large Professor.

No.	Title	Length
1.	"A New Day Begins"	1:42
2.	"MARS (The Dream Team)" (featuring AZ, Redman and Styles P)	3:13
3.	"Industry"	4:05
4.	"More" (featuring Chantelle Nandi)	3:53
5.	"Reflection"	0:41
6.	"D.U. (Divine Unity)" (featuring Nature)	3:23
7.	"Honorable" (featuring Raekwon)	2:19
8.	"Rap Basquiat"	2:50
9.	"Rise" (featuring Maya Azucena)	3:39
10.	"Home" (featuring Black Rob)	2:08
11.	"Valuable Lessons" (featuring Jarell Perry)	4:12
Total length:		32:03

== Charts ==
Chart (2014)	Peak position
US Top R&B/Hip-Hop Albums (Billboard)	30
