= The Testament (Cormega album) =

Studio album by Cormega
- Released: February 22, 2005
- Recorded: 1996–1998
- Genre: Hip-hop
- Length: 47:27
- Label: Legal Hustle
- Producer: Cormega; Dave Atkinson; Havoc; Hot Day; Jae Supreme; Nashiem Myrick; Prestige; RNS; Sha Money XL; Suga Bear

Cormega chronology
| Legal Hustle (2004) | The Testament (2005) | Born and Raised (2009) |

Professional ratings
Review scores
| Source | Rating |
|---|---|
| AllMusic | 4/5 stars |
| HipHopDX | 4/5 |
| RapReviews | 9/10 |
| Spin | B+ |

The Testament is the third studio album by American rapper Cormega. It was originally recorded as Cormega's debut album in the mid-1990s, and scheduled for a release on Def Jam Recordings, but was eventually shelved. Cormega, after many years, was finally able to obtain the masters to the album, and released it on his own Legal Hustle imprint in 2005.

The title track appeared on a CD-sampler celebrating the 10 years of Def Jam, this release lists The Testament original release date to have been September 1, 1998.

== Track listing ==
| No. | Title | Producer(s) | Length |
|---|---|---|---|
| 1. | "Intro" | Nashiem Myrick | 1:14 |
| 2. | "62 Pick Up" | Cormega | 2:52 |
| 3. | "One Love" | RNS | 3:30 |
| 4. | "Interlude" | Cormega | 0:33 |
| 5. | "Angel Dust" (featuring Havoc) | Sha Money XL | 3:32 |
| 6. | "Dead Man Walking" | Hot Day; Jae Supreme | 2:12 |
| 7. | "Montana Diary" | Nashiem Myrick | 4:45 |
| 8. | "Testament" | Dave Atkinson | 3:56 |
| 9. | "Testament" (Original Version) | Dave Atkinson | 3:48 |
| 10. | "Every Hood" (featuring Hussein Fatal and Niko) | Suga Bear | 3:41 |
| 11. | "Coco Butter" | Prestige | 4:11 |
| 12. | "Killaz Theme" (featuring Mobb Deep) | Havoc | 3:44 |
| 13. | "Love Is Love" (featuring Tiffany) | Nashiem Myrick | 4:40 |
| 14. | "Dead Man Walking" (Alternate Version) | Hot Day; Jae Supreme | 4:49 |
| 15. | "Testament" (Video) |
| Total length: | | | 47:27 |

Notes

- Track 14 is a hidden track.
- Track 15 is an enhanced CD bonus.

== Charts ==
| Chart (2005) | Peak position |
|---|---|
| US Top R&B/Hip-Hop Albums (Billboard) | 76 |
| US Independent Albums (Billboard) | 46 |
