= The True Meaning =

Studio album by Cormega
- Released: June 25, 2002
- Recorded: 2001
- Studio: C Mo' Greens Studio (New York, NY)
- Genre: East Coast hip hop
- Length: 39:42
- Label: Legal Hustle; Landspeed Records
- Producer: Alchemist; Buckwild; DR Period; Emile; Hangmen 3; Hi-Tek; Hot Day; J-Love; J "Waxx" Garfield; Large Professor

Cormega chronology
The Realness (2001)	The True Meaning (2002)	Legal Hustle (2004)

Singles from The True Meaning
- 1. "Built for This" Released: 2002

Professional ratings
Review scores
Source	Rating
AllMusic	4/5 stars
RapReviews	8.5/10
The Source	3.5/5 stars
Vibe	3.5/5 stars

The True Meaning is the second solo studio album by American rapper Cormega. It was released on June 25, 2002 via Legal Hustle/Landspeed Records. Production was handled by J "Waxx" Garfield, J-Love, Alchemist, Buckwild, DR Period, Emile, Hangmen 3, Hi-Tek, Hot Day, and Large Professor, who also provided the lone guest appearance on the album.

The album peaked at number 95 on the Billboard 200, number 25 on the Top R&B/Hip-Hop Albums and number five on the Independent Albums in the United States. Its lead single, "Built for This", reached number 58 on the Hot R&B/Hip-Hop Singles Sales.

It was critically acclaimed and won the prestigious "Independent Album of the Year" at The Source Awards 2003. He also received "Impact Artist of the Year" honors at the Underground Music Awards. It was praised for its "back to basics" formula, tight beats and fierce rhymes. Standout tracks include "Live Ya Life", "Love in Love Out" which documents Cormega's feud with fellow Queensbridge rapper Nas, and "Verbal Graffiti".

== Track listing ==
No.	Title	Writer(s)	Producer(s)	Length
1.	"Introspective"	Cory McKay; Emile Haynie	Emile	2:00
2.	"Verbal Graffiti"	McKay; Jeffrey Backues Neal; John Bynoe; Raymond Scott	Hangmen 3	2:46
3.	"Live Ya Life"	McKay; Jay Garfield	J "Waxx" Garfield	3:43
4.	"Ain't Gone Change"	McKay		0:48
5.	"The True Meaning"	McKay; Darryl Pittman	DR Period	3:52
6.	"A Thin Line"	McKay; Anthony Best	Buckwild	3:59
7.	"The Legacy"	McKay; Alan Maman	Alchemist	2:47
8.	"Love in Love Out"	McKay; Jason Elias	J-Love	3:11
9.	"The Come Up" (featuring Large Professor)	McKay; Paul Mitchell	Large Professor	2:48
10.	"Built for This"	McKay; Garfield	J "Waxx" Garfield	2:49
11.	"Soul Food"	McKay; Garfield	J "Waxx" Garfield	2:37
12.	"Take These Jewels"	McKay; Tony Cottrell	Hi-Tek	2:15
13.	"Endangered Species"	McKay; Elias	J-Love	2:56
14.	"Therapy"	McKay; Dante Franklin	Hot Day	3:11
Total length:				39:42

== Personnel ==
- Cory "Cormega" McKay – vocals, art direction, sleeve notes
- Nicky Guiland – vocals (track 3)
- Paul "Large Professor" Mitchell – vocals & producer (track 9)
- Emile Haynie – producer (track 1)
- Jeffrey Backues Neal – producer (track 2)
- John Bynoe – producer (track 2)
- Raymond "Benzino" Scott – producer (track 2)
- Jay "Waxx" Garfield – producer (tracks: 3, 10, 11)
- Darryl "DR Period" Pittman – producer (track 4)
- Anthony "Buckwild" Best – producer (track 5)
- Alan "The Alchemist" Maman – producer (track 6)
- Jason "J-Love" Elias – producer (tracks: 8, 13)
- Tony "Hi-Tek" Cottrell – producer (track 12)
- "Hot Day" Dante Franklin – producer (track 14)
- Max Vargas – recording, mixing
- Trevor "Karma" Gendron – design, layout
- Jonathan Mannion – photography
- Matthew Doszkocs – photography
- Theo Sedlmayr – legal

== Charts ==
Chart (2002)	Peak position
US Billboard 200	95
US Top R&B/Hip-Hop Albums (Billboard)	25
US Independent Albums (Billboard)	5
