= Tragedy Khadafi =

American rapper and record producer (born 1971)

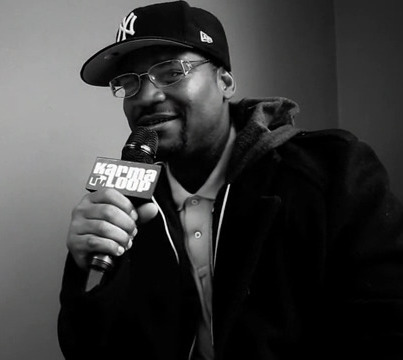
- Tragedy Khadafi in 2013

Background information
- Also known as: Intelligent Hoodlum; The Foul Mahdi; Percy Tragedy; MC Percy; MC Tragedy
- Born: Percy Lee Chapman; August 13, 1971 (age 55); Queens, New York City, U.S.
- Genre: East Coast hip-hop
- Occupations: Rapper; songwriter; record producer; record executive
- Years active: 1985–present
- Labels: Cold Chillin'; Tuff Break/A&M/PolyGram; Gee Street/V2/BMG; 25 To Life; Penalty; Money Maker; Dolo; Solid; DistroLord Digital
- Formerly of: Black Market Militia; Juice Crew

Percy Lee Chapman (born August 13, 1971), known by his stage name Tragedy Khadafi (formerly Intelligent Hoodlum), is an American rapper and record producer. Hailing from the Queensbridge Housing Projects in Long Island City, Queens, New York City, he is documented with coining the term "illmatic" during his appearance on Marley Marl's album In Control, Volume 1 (1988). The word was the inspiration for fellow New York rapper Nas' debut album of the same name.

== Biography ==
Khadafi began his career as one half of the duo Super Kids, along with Queensbridge producer DJ Hot Day. This output caught the attention of Marley Marl, who in 1986 produced the duo's single "The Tragedy (Don't Do It)", and "Stunt of the Block". Chapman was then made a junior member of the Juice Crew alongside artists such as Big Daddy Kane, Kool G Rap, and MC Shan. In 1987, he appeared as MC Percy on the B side of the 12" "Juice Crew All Stars" and on the last Super Kids single, "Hot Day Master Mix" appearing on tracks "Hip Hop Kids Live At U.S.A" and "Go Queensbridge". After a conviction that year (he was only 16 years old) for robbery charges followed by serving time in the Elmira Correctional Facility. In 1988, he appeared alongside fellow Juice Crew members on the Marley Marl compilation album In Control Vol.1, on the solo tracks "The Rebel" and "Live Motivator". While in prison, Chapman became a Five Percenter and began working under the alias "Intelligent Hoodlum", and released the self-titled album Intelligent Hoodlum on A&M Records. The album was produced by Marley Marl (with co-production by Large Professor) and contained the singles "Back to Reality", "Black and Proud," and "Arrest the President".

Chapman continued to record throughout the remainder of the 1990s releasing a follow-up Intelligent Hoodlum album titled Tragedy – Saga of a Hoodlum for A&M Records in 1993. The album spawned two singles "Street Life/Mad Brothers Know his Name" and "Grand Groove/Get Large". One of his last recordings as Intelligent Hoodlum was the title cut for the motion picture soundtrack of Posse, a Hollywood Western that told the story of an African-American gunslinger posse. This song marked the end of Chapman's overt focus on Conscious hip hop, Black history and political commentary in his verses. Working with Capone, Noreaga and Mobb Deep, recording "L.A L.A" a response to Tha Dogg Pound's "New York, New York", Intelligent Hoodlum then began working under the name Tragedy Khadafi in 1997 and created a group called "CNN" and ended up getting them signed to Penalty Records . He also executive produced the group Capone-N-Noreaga's debut album, The War Report, on which he appeared more on the album than Capone. When the latter returned to prison, Noreaga severed ties with Tragedy. In 1998, Khadafi formed the group Iron Sheiks along with his lifelong friend, Michael Butler a.k.a. Imam T.H.U.G., who was also from Queensbridge, releasing an EP, which contained the underground classic "True Confessions".

Khadafi's third album, Against All Odds, was scheduled for release in 1999, but conflict with his label stalled the release, finally being released in 2001, which was also the first appearance of emcee HeadRush Napoleon, who continued to work with Khadafi on future recordings. On the album, Khadafi dissed Noreaga and accused him of stealing his rhyming style on tracks like "Crime Nationalist" or "Blood Type". Noreaga kept the animosity going with his track "Halfway Thugs Pt. II." This was followed by Still Reportin'... in 2003. In 2005, he released Thug Matrix independently and also released an album as a member of the group Black Market Militia. Khadafi's latest releases, Blood Ballads and Thug Matrix 2, were both released in 2006.

He also starred in a documentary known as Tragedy: The Story of Queensbridge about his life and his struggles, growing up, his being a junior member of the Juice Crew, the numerous times he was incarcerated, and the toll a hard life has on a poor African-American child growing up without a father and with a mother addicted to heroin.

On December 27, 2007, Khadafi was convicted of selling narcotics and sentenced to a maximum of four years in prison. Although originally scheduled to be released on January 21, 2011, Tragedy was granted early parole, and released on June 23, 2010.

In a Reddit "Ask Me Anything" session in 2014, Tragedy Khadafi claimed he was "hurt" by the assassination of Muammar Gaddafi and calling it "an embarrassing blotch on America's history."

In 2021, Tragedy reunited with N.O.R.E on the track "We Still Here" off his Hidden Files album. The project also featured Raekwon and Planet Asia.

Over the years, Khadafi has appeared on songs with Raekwon, Kool G Rap, Big Daddy Kane, Planet Asia, Ghostface Killah, Styles P, A.G., Cormega, Sticky Fingaz, Pete Rock, KRS-ONE, Cappadonna, R.A. the Rugged Man, Jadakiss, Black Thought, Mic Geronimo, Sheek Louch, Ja Rule, Nature, Ali Vegas, Wise Intelligent, Blaq Poet, Chuck D, Reef the Lost Cauze, Canibus, Vinnie Paz, Apathy, Celph Titled, and the late DMX, among others.

Additionally, Tragedy Khadafi has made a variety of guest appearances on other rap artists’ projects, especially in the 25 years since The War Report. In 2013, Canadian producer Marco Polo, known for his extensive work with Pharoahe Monch and Masta Ace, invited Khadafi to appear on “Astonishing”, a posse cut that also featured Large Professor, O.C., and Inspectah Deck. 2017 saw him appear on “I Cried”, a song by a group of producers known as the Recordkingz. Further, WiseRap, Zicc, DJ Midnite, and E-Ratic Beats, who are all British hip hop artists, featured him on their collaborative song “In Too Deep (London 2 Queens)” in 2021.

In the 2020s, Khadafi made guest appearances on two songs by Canadian hip hop artists. In December 2021, he appeared on “Gates of Abbadon” by the Greek Orthodox Christian artist Nec Nymbl. Then, in July 2022, he appeared with Guilty Simpson, Thirstin Howl III, Bonshah, Fraction, and Ultra Magnus on “We Gon’ Stomp Shit”, a posse cut by a Bahá’í rapper from Toronto named The Mighty Rhino. In addition, he appeared on “Leviathan” and “Casino”, two songs from Billy, the most recent solo album by the Jewish rapper Ill Bill of Non Phixion and La Coka Nostra, who is from Canarsie.

As of June 2023, Khadafi's most recent guest appearance is on rapper Cuban Link's single "Jewelry".

== Discography ==
=== Studio albums ===
Album Information
Intelligent Hoodlum (as Intelligent Hoodlum)
- Released: July 10, 1990
- Label: A&M/PolyGram Records
- Formats: CD, LP, Cassette, digital download
Tragedy: Saga of a Hoodlum (as Intelligent Hoodlum)
- Released: June 22, 1993
- Label: Tuff Break/A&M/PolyGram Records
- Formats: CD, LP, Cassette, digital download
Against All Odds
- Released: June 5, 2001
- Label: Gee Street/V2/BMG Records
- Formats: CD, LP, digital download
Still Reportin'...
- Released: October 21, 2003
- Label: Solid Records
- Formats: CD, LP, digital download
Thug Matrix
- Released: October 4, 2005
- Label: FastLife Records
- Formats: CD, digital download
The Death of Tragedy
- Released: June 19, 2007
- Label: Traffic Entertainment/25 To Life Entertainment
- Formats: CD, digital download
Thug Matrix 3
- Released: September 20, 2011
- Label: 25 To Life Aura/Money Maker Entertainment
- Format: CD
Pre Magnum Opus
- Released: December 16, 2014
- Label: 25 To Life Aura
- Format: CD
The AuraPort
- Released: November 11, 2016
- Label: Not On Label
- Format: CD
The Mahdi Files
- Released: 2017
- Label: Self-Released
- Format: Digital Download
The Builders
- Released: 2018
- Label: Self-Released
- Format: Digital Download
Hidden Files
- Released: 2021
- Label: Rival
- Format: Digital Download

=== Compilation albums ===
- 2001: Thug Matrix 41-18
- 2005: Q.U. Soldier
- April 17, 2006: Blood Ballads
- May 9, 2006: Thug Matrix 2
- 2011: Hood Father
- 2017: The Kuwait Tapes

=== Collaboration albums ===
- 1998: Iron Sheiks EP (with Imam Thug as Iron Sheiks)
- 2005: Black Market Militia (with Killah Priest, Timbo King, Hell Razah and William Cooper as Black Market Militia)
- 2009: Lethal Weapon (with Trez)
- 2012: Militant Minds EP (with Blak Madeen)
- 2013: Golden Era Music Sciences (with Tragic Allies as 7 G.E.M.S.)
- 2017: Rare Fabric (with Frost Gamble)
- 2018: Immortal Titans (with BP)
- 2019: Full Metal Jacket EP (with Ras Ceylon & Dawit Justice)
- 2019: Camouflage Regime (with Vinnie Paz)
- 2021: Truth Hurts EP (with Shawneci Icecold)
- 2023: Rebel Kings EP (with Endemic Emerald)

=== Vocal appearances ===
- 1986: "The Tragedy (Don't Do It)" (from the Super Kids single The Tragedy (Don't Do It)
- 1986: "Stunt of the Block" (from the compilation EP "The Juice Crew")
- 1987: "The Super Kids Live at Hip Hop U.S.A" (from the single Hot Day Mastermix/The Super Kids Live at Hip Hop U.S.A/Go Queensbridge)
- 1987: "Go Queensbridge" (from the single Hot Day Mastermix/The Super Kids Live at Hip Hop U.S.A/Go Queensbridge)
- 1987: "Juice Crew All Stars" (from the Juice Crew All Stars single Evolution)
- 1988: "The Rebel"; "Live Motivator" (from the Marley Marl album In Control, Volume 1)
- 1991: "America Eats The Young"; "Keep Control" (from the Marley Marl album In Control, Volume 2: For Your Steering Pleasure)
- 1993: "Six Million Ways to Die" (from the Funkmaster Flex single Sad And Blue / Six Million Ways to Die)
- 1994: "Drama" (from the Str8-G album Shadow of a G)
- 1994: "To da Old School" (from the Dred Scott album Breakin' Combs)
- 1995: "Let's Be Specific" (from the Funkmaster Flex album The Mix Tape Volume 1 – 60 Minutes of Funk)
- 1996: "The Turnaround" (Thug Remix) (from the Real Live single The Turnaround)
- 1996: "First Day of Spring" (from the Mobb Deep EP "Pre Hell" – unreleased songs from "Hell on Earth")
- 1997: "Real" (from the DJ Krush album MiLight)
- 1997: "Stick You"; "Parole Violators"; "Neva Die Alone"; "T.O.N.Y. (Top of New York)"; "Channel 10"; "Stay Tuned (Thug Paradise)"; "L.A., L.A. (Kuwait Mix)"; "Black Gangstas" (from the Capone-N-Noreaga album The War Report)
- 1997: "Feelin' Inside (Touch of Thug Remix) [from Bobby Brown single Feelin' Inside)
- 1997: "Usual Suspects" (from the Mic Geronimo album Vendetta/ How to Be a Player (soundtrack))
- 1998: "Raw Footage" (from the Sporty Thievz album Street Cinema)
- 1998: "Strange Fruit" (from the Pete Rock album Soul Survivor)
- 1998: "Are You Ready?" (from the Shannel single Are You Ready?)
- 2000: "Genghis Khan" (from the Jedi Mind Tricks album Violent By Design)
- 2000: "Da Bridge 2001" (from the compilation album QB Finest)
- 2001: "They Forced My Hand" (from the Cormega album The Realness)
- 2001: "Too High Too Low" (from the Screwball album Loyalty)
- 2001: "Armageddon (Crime Side of Life)" (from the Self aka Eddie Whispers album What About My Life)
- 2001: "Get Back" (from the compilation album The 41st Side)
- 2001: "Pay Back" (from the Prodigy unreleased single Pay Back)
- 2002: "C'mon" (from the compilation album The Anti-Backpack Movement)
- 2003: "True Confessions"; "QB2G" (from the Imam Thug album Die Hard)
- 2003: "Kublai Khan" (from the Jedi Mind Tricks album Visions of Gandhi)
- 2003: "Fallen Soldiers" (from the 24k album Quotable)
- 2004: "Kingz of Queens" (from the V.V.A.A. single Kingz of Queens)
- 2005: "Think Differently" (from the compilation album Wu-Tang Meets the Indie Culture)
- 2005: "Ape Something" (from the Littles mixtape Reloaded)
- 2005: "The Revolution Won't Be Televised" (from the Full One album To the Fullest)
- 2007: "Renaissance" (from the Hell Razah album Renaissance Child)
- 2007: "One Hand Wash The Other" (from the Killa Sha album God Walk on Water)
- 2007: "911" (from the Big Left album World War Three)
- 2008: "Rebelution" (from the Almighty mixtape The Original S.I.N.)
- 2008: "Whale Head" (from the Da Evangillest mixtape Quit Ya Day Job)
- 2008: "The Damage" (from the Ras Ceylon album Scientific Non-Fiction)
- 2009: "Define Yourself" (from the Cormega album Born and Raised)
- 2009: "On the Streets" (from the Betrayl album The Life N Death of My Hood)
- 2009: "I Cried" (from the Recordkingz album Heavyweight)
- 2010: "State Ya Name" (from the UGP album The Sacrifice)
- 2010: "The Realest" (from the Gawdbless street album Frontline Killers Vol. 1)
- 2010: "Gangsta (Remix)" (from the Tefla & Jaleel album Weißt du noch?)
- 2011: "Camaraderie (Real To Real)" (from the Divine street single "Camaraderie (Real To Real)")
- 2011: "Galaxy of Queens" (from the Nutso single Galaxy of Queens)
- 2011: "The Damage (HungryBros RMX)" (from the Ras Ceylon album Gideon Force Vol. 1)
- 2011: "VII" (from the Cormega album Raw Forever)
- 2011: "Best of Both Coast" (from the Planet Asia album The Bar Mitzvah)
- 2012: "Storm G - Tossed To The Fire" (from the DirtyDef album 𝘋𝘪𝘳𝘵𝘺 𝘊𝘰𝘭𝘭𝘢𝘣𝘴)
- 2012: "7 Fires of Prophecy" (from the Vinnie Paz album God of the Serengeti)
- 2012: "Focused Up" (from the Large Professor album Professor @ Large)
- 2012: "Hood Ikon" (from the Snowgoons album Snowgoons Dynasty)
- 2012: "Salvation" (from the B Mugz album Triumph over Trust)
- 2012: "Steadily Shine" (from the Arafat & Gandhi album Two Swords)
- 2012: "Resurrection" (from the Megadon single Resurrection)
- 2012: "La pyramide des armes" (from the Baccarat & DJ Yep album Trésors de guerre)
- 2012: "ReGeneration" (from the Ras Ceylon album Gideon Force Vol. 2)
- 2012: "The Threat" (from the Babylon Warchild album The Gatekeepers)
- 2012: "Thieves In The Hallway" (from the American Poets 2099 compilation album Murderous Poetry)
- 2012: "American Me" (from the U-Krime single Thugtime / American Me)
- 2012: "Blue Magic" (from the Rome Clientel EP The Lost Catacombs)
- 2013: "Skeeoo" (from the Supraliminal album Full Script)
- 2013: "New World Over" (from the Marcanum X album Quantum Chaotica)
- 2013: "Immaculate" (from the Yusuf Abdul-Mateen album Rhyme Dawah)
- 2013: "Camouflage Unicorns" (from the N.O.R.E. album Student of the Game)
- 2013: "Ambassadors" (from the DUS album Ambassadors)
- 2013: "Let ‘Em Know" (from the DJ Skizz album B.Q.E. (Brooklyn-Queens Experience))
- 2013: "7th Dynasty" (from the compilation album Class Struggle)
- 2013: "High Society"/"Calisthenics"/"20\20 Vision" (from the Endemic album Terminal Illness Part 2)
- 2013: "Respect da Jux" (from the Triple Seis album The Underdawg)
- 2013: "Hold Ya Ground" (with Long Island emcees Dave Z (The MC) and Lantz)
- 2013: "Astonishing" (from the Marco Polo album PA2: The Director's Cut)
- 2014: "Historic" (from the HRSMN EP Historic)
- 2015: "Religion" (from the Moon Crickets mixtape The Calm Before Tte Storm)
- 2015: "U.M.A.R."; "Future"; "7 Continents"; "Elevate"; "3 on 3"; "Now"; "Foul 120" (from the Capone-N-Noreaga album Lessons)
- 2016: "Be About It" (from the Discourse album Megalomaniac)
- 2016: "Holding Back" (from the Blaq Poet & Comet album Mad Screwz)
- 2016: "New York Gangsters" (from the 5 boroughs Project Official Track)
- 2017: "High Quota" (from the GQ Nothin Pretty album Animation LP)
- 2017: "Back to Basics" (from the DJ Rybe album Channel Zero)
- 2017: "Hit" (from the Ju Muny album Unorthodox)
- 2017: "Omnipotent" (from the Endemic Emerald & Skanks the Rap Martyr album Rapsploitation)
- 2018: "N.W.O." (from the Ghostface Killah album The Lost Tapes)
- 2019: "TNT"; "TNT" (REMIX)"; "Extreme Measures" (from Truth album The Fight for Survival)
- 2021: "Real Headz" (from the collaborative single Real Headz with Sauveur Eloheem)
- 2021: “In Too Deep (London 2 Queens)” - with WiseRap, Zico, DJ Midnite, and E-Ratic Beats
- 2021: “Gates of Abbadon” (with Nec Nymbl)
- 2022: "Entourage" (from Truth album For All Intents and Purposes)
- 2022: “We Gon’ Stomp Shit” (from The Mighty Rhino’s album To Relieve The Sorrow-Laden Heart)
- 2023: "Jewelry" (with Cuban Link and Sha)
- 2023: "Leviathan"; "Casino" (from the Ill Bill album Billy)
