= Havoc (musician) =

American rapper (born 1974)

- Muchita performing in 2026

Background information
- Born: Kejuan Waliek Muchita; May 21, 1974 (age 52); New York City, U.S.
- Origin: Queens, New York City, U.S.
- Genre: East Coast hip-hop
- Occupations: Rapper; songwriter; record producer
- Years active: 1991–present
- Labels: HClass; MNRK; Babygrande; Sony; Nature Sounds; Mobb Deep Inc.; Loud
- Formerly of: Mobb Deep
- Website: havocofmobbdeep.com

Kejuan Waliek Muchita (born May 21, 1974), known professionally as Havoc, is an American rapper and record producer. He was one half of the hip-hop duo Mobb Deep with Prodigy.

== Biography ==
Havoc was born in Brooklyn, and raised in the Queensbridge Houses in Long Island City, Queens. At a later age, Havoc found out his paternal grandfather was jazz musician Bill Dixon. He graduated from the High School of Art and Design in Manhattan, New York in 1992, where he met Prodigy. He is one half of the iconic hip-hop duo Mobb Deep, and in addition to producing nearly the entire Mobb Deep catalogue, has also produced songs for MCs such as The Notorious B.I.G., Eminem, Nas, Raekwon, 50 Cent, 112, Method Man, Mariah Carey, Puff Daddy, Kanye West, LL Cool J, Rohff, Big Noyd, Lil' Kim, Capone-N-Noreaga, Foxy Brown, Onyx, and his partner Prodigy on his solo work. In 2005, Mobb Deep recorded for fellow Queens rapper 50 Cent's record label G-Unit Records and left the label in 2009, in a mutually agreed-to release.

Havoc is renowned as one of the most iconic figures in New York hip-hop. Popular music magazine Complex ranked Havoc among the top hip-hop producers of 1995 after The Infamous. Beattips.com ranked him as the 24th most influential beatmaker of all time citing his dual abilities of rapping and producing. Following The Infamous, he tweaked his skills and transitioned to a more atmospheric production style that incorporated samples from classical music, most notably visible on the 1996 album Hell on Earth. As a rapper, he is known for his hardcore lyricism and consistent flow. He also contributed background vocals and a verse on Black Moon's debut album Enta da Stage in 1993.

In July 2009, Havoc was featured alongside in J Dilla's music video for "24K Rap" off of the Jay Stay Paid album, the video was directed by Derek Pike. In 2010, Havoc produced a beat for Eminem that resulted in a song called "Untitled" which is a hidden track on Eminem's album Recovery and contributed to the iTunes bonus track to Raekwon's album Shaolin vs. Wu-Tang & Bad Meets Evil's Hell: The Sequel EP. He revealed that he plans to record a new Mobb Deep album with Nas. His third studio album 13 was released on May 7, 2013.

Havoc worked with Kavinsky on his 2013 album OutRun. He wrote the lyrics and sang the vocals for "Suburbia", the sixth track on the album. In 2016, Havoc helped produce "Real Friends" and "Famous", two tracks on Kanye West's album The Life of Pablo.

His original productions have been featured in numerous commercially successful films, well known television series and popular video games, and he is a character in Def Jam: Fight for NY. Havoc produced the New York Yankees official 2020 anthem, "Squad Up", that features verses from both Havoc and Method Man.

== Feuds ==
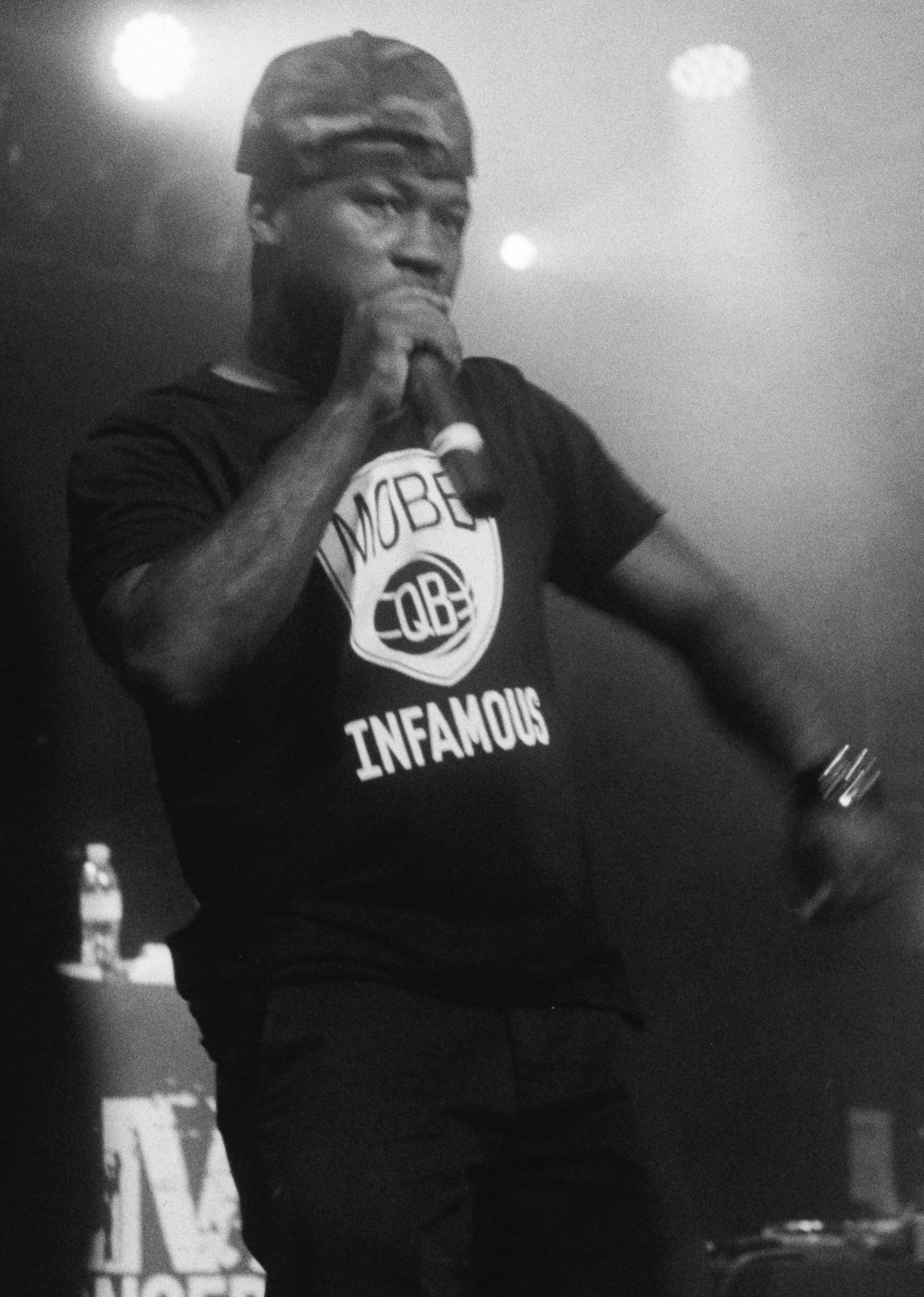
Havoc performing in 2014

In July 2012, Havoc wrote a series of derogatory comments about Prodigy on Twitter, after Prodigy denied engaging in homosexual relationships in prison. At first, Havoc claimed that his Twitter account was hacked. However, he later confirmed that he wrote the tweets and expressed his frustrations with Prodigy in an interview with AllHipHop. He stated that Mobb Deep was on an "indefinite hiatus" until the duo worked out their differences. Havoc later released a diss track aimed at Prodigy, which was titled "Separated (Real from the Fake)". Prodigy did not respond to Havoc's song and even stated publicly that Mobb Deep would eventually reconcile. In March 2013, the duo announced that they had reconciled and were going on tour.

== Discography ==
=== Studio albums ===
- 2007: The Kush
- 2009: Hidden Files
- 2013: 13
- 2014: 13 Reloaded

=== Collaboration albums ===
- 2016: The Silent Partner (with The Alchemist)
- 2020: In the Name of Prodigy (with Flee Lord)
- 2021: Extreme Measures (with Dark Lo)
- 2021: Future of the Streets (Deluxe Edition) (with Nyce da Future)
- 2021: Wreckage Manner (with Styles P)
- 2024: Everything Is...Guttr (with Ras Kass and RJ Payne)

=== Live albums ===
- 2023: The Infamous Live (with Benny Reid)

=== Mixtapes ===
- 2009: From Now On (The Mixtape)

=== Extended plays ===
- 2021: Future of the Streets (with Nyce da Future)

=== Singles ===
- 2007: "I'm the Boss"
- 2007: "Be There"
- 2009: "Watch Me" (Feat. Ricky Blaze)
- 2009: "Heart of the Grind"
- 2009: "H Is Back"
- 2009: "Always Have a Choice"
- 2010: "If You Love Me" (Feat. Sheek Louch, Joell Ortiz & Cassidy)
- 2012: "Same Shit, Different Day"
- 2012: "Separated (Real from the Fake)" (Feat. Ferg Brim)
- 2013: "Gritty" (Instrumental)
- 2013: "Tell Me to My Face" (Feat. Royce da 5'9")
- 2013: "Gone"
- 2013: "Life We Chose" (Feat. Lloyd Banks)
- 2013: "Life We Chose" (Remix) (Feat. Prodigy & Lloyd Banks)

=== Guest appearances ===
** indicates Havoc production

- 1993: "U Da Man" ---- Black Moon, Smif-n-Wessun, Dru Ha from Enta da Stage
- 1995: "Da Funk Mode" ---- Tragedy
- 1995: "Let's Be Specific" ---- Funkmaster Flex, Freddie Foxxx, Tragedy, Cool Whip, Raekwon from The Mix Tape, Volume 1: 60 Minutes of Funk
- **1996: "The Set Up" ---- Nas from It Was Written
- **1996: "No Doubt" ---- Tyrone Wheatley from NFL Jams
- **1996: "The Promise" ---- Foxy Brown from Ill Na Na
- *1997: "Parole Violators"; "Illegal Life" ---- Capone-n-Noreaga from The War Report
- **1997: "Adidas" ---- Made Men, Man Terror from How to Be a Player (soundtrack) [Vinyl Only Track]
- **1998: "Angel Dust" ---- Cormega from The Testament {released 2005}
- **1998: "Figaro Chain" ---- La the Darkman from Heist of the Century
- **1999: "Suspect Niggaz" ---- O.G.C, Buckshot from The M-Pire Shrikez Back
- **1999: "Triflin' (Mobb Deep Remix)" ---- Coko
- 2000: "On the Real" ---- Screwball from Y2K: The Album
- **2000: "Wanna Be Thugs"; "Dealt with the Bullshit" ---- Prodigy from H.N.I.C.
- **2000: "We Live This" ---- Big Noyd, Roxanne Shante from QB's Finest
- 2001: "Don't Wanna Fuck With" ---- High & Mighty, R.A. the Rugged Man from Air Force 1
- **2001: "Cardboard Box" ---- Lakey the Kid, Nature, The Jackal, Littles from The 41st Side
- **2001: "U Feel Me/Options" ---- Fat Joe, Remy Martin, Noyd, Capone from The Album V2.0
- 2002: "Thug Chronicles" ---- Kool G Rap from The Giancana Story
- **2002: "Hold Up" ---- Tony Touch, Onyx, X1 from Bacdafucup: Part II
- 2003: "The Code"; "Fall Back" ---- Tragedy Khadafi from Still Reportin'...
- 2003: "King of Kings" ---- Raekwon from The Lex Diamond Story
- 2003: "Noyd Holding It Down"; "Air It Out" ---- Big Noyd from Only the Strong
- **2003: "Hold It Now" ---- Lil' Kim from La Bella Mafia
- 2004: "D-Block to QB" ---- The Alchemist, Big Noyd, Styles P, J-Hood from 1st Infantry
- 2005: "The Game" --- Tragedy Khafadi from Thug Matrix
- 2007: "That's That" ----- Prodigy and the Alchemist from Return of the Mac
- *2009: "Define Yourself"; "Love Your Family" ---- Cormega from Born and Raised
- 2009: "Evil Deeds" ---- RZA, Ghostface KIllah from Wu-Tang Chamber Music
- 2009: "Who's Dat Guy" ---- R.A. the Rugged Man from Legendary Classics Volume 1
- 2009: "24K Rap" ---- J Dilla, Raekwon from Jay Stay Paid
- 2010: "Do It to Death" ---- Statik Selektah, Kool G Rap, Lil' Fame from 100 Proof: The Hangover
- **2011: "Your World and My World" ---- Raekwon from Shaolin vs. Wu-Tang
- 2012: "Who U Bullshittin'" ---- Prodigy from H.N.I.C. 3
- 2013: "Camouflage Unicorns" --- N.O.R.E., Tragedy from Student of the Game
- 2013: "R.I.P." ---- Prodigy, Raekwon and the Alchemist from Albert Einstein
- 2014: "A Day in the Life" ---- A-Villa, Freeway, AZ, Macie Stewart
- 2015: "Sheet Music" ---- Gangrene, Sean Price from You Disgust Me
- 2019: "Three Kings" ---- Diamond D, Erick Sermon from The Diam Piece 2
- **2020: "Bound to Take Losses" ---- Flee Lord from In the Name of Prodigy
- **2020: "Juvenile Hell" ---- Conway the Machine, Flee Lord, Lloyd Banks from From King to a God
- 2020: "Way Up" ---- Statik Selektah, Bun B, Haile Supreme from The Balancing Act
- 2021: "Money Calling" ---- Grafh, DJ Shay from Stop Calling Art Content!
- 2022: "Corvette Rally Strips" ---- Currensy, the Alchemist from Continuance
- 2022: "Paradise" ---- Cormega from The Realness II
- 2022: "Pledge Allegiance" ---- His Imperial Majesty, Cormega from His Imperial Music List No. 1
- 2023: "War Ruckas" ---- El Camino, Black Soprano Family, King Ralph from They Spit on Jesus
- 2024: "Vote or Else" ---- Bun B from Vote or Else
- 2024: "Had It Coming" ---- 38 Spesh, Lloyd Banks from Mother & Gun
- 2024: "Scientology" ---- The Alchemist from The Genuine Articulate
- 2025: "Celebration Moments" ---- The Alchemist & Hit-Boy from Goldfish
- 2025: "Pure Paradise" ---- Cormega

== Video game appearances ==
Havoc is a playable character in the video game Def Jam: Fight for NY.
