= Cormega =

American rapper

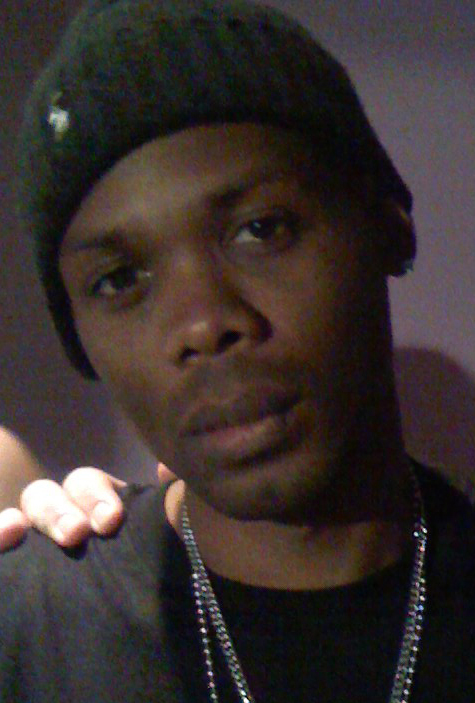
- Cormega in 2008

Background information
- Born: Corey McKay; Brooklyn, New York City, U.S.
- Origin: Queens, New York City, U.S.
- Genres: East Coast hip-hop
- Occupations: Rapper; songwriter
- Works: Cormega discography
- Years active: 1989–present
- Labels: Aura; Legal Hustle; Landspeed; Infamous; Violator
- Formerly of: The Firm

Corey McKay, better known by his stage name Cormega, is an American rapper.

== Early life ==
Cormega was born in Brooklyn and raised in Queens. He was childhood friends with Nas, Havoc and Capone, who all went on to become successful rappers. A frequent theme of his music is the countless number of his friends and family that have been killed by violence.

== Career ==
=== 1990s ===
He was featured on Hot Day's "Going Straight Up" from his album It's My Turn. He was also featured on Blaq Poet and DJ Hot Day's track "Set It Off" from their album Without Warning in 1991. During a period of incarceration, Cormega gained some attention following a shout-out from Nas on his song "One Love", from the Illmatic album released in 1994. Following his release from jail in 1995, Cormega became determined to pursue rapping. Nas included him on a song titled "Affirmative Action" on his album It Was Written released on July 2, 1996. The song also featured AZ and Foxy Brown, and became The Firm's first appearance. He was signed to Def Jam and recorded an album called The Testament. Nas, his manager Steve Stoute and producers Dr. Dre and The Trackmasters joined to form The Firm. However, Cormega was replaced with another Queensbridge artist, Nature, because Nas and/or Stoute favored Nature. That ended Cormega's friendship with Nas. After he fell out with his manager Chris Lighty and his label Violator Records his debut album The Testament was indefinitely shelved. During the recording for The Testament Cormega responded to Nas' "One Love" in the form of a letter also titled "One Love".

=== 2000s ===
In 2000, he was released from his contract and he started his own record company, Legal Hustle Records. Cormega vented his disappointment with Nas and The Firm in a mixtape song titled "Never Personal". This song was never directly pointed to Nas, but the media made it look like that. In 2001, he released his debut album, The Realness. Many of the songs share a theme of betrayal. Nas responded to Cormega on his song "Destroy and Rebuild" from his album Stillmatic. Cormega retaliated with more mixtape tracks, "A Slick Response" and "Realmatic".

Cormega's follow-up album, The True Meaning won the Source Magazine 's Underground Album of the Year award. In 2004, he followed up with Legal Hustle, a compilation album showcasing his label's artists. In 2005, he released The Testament on his own label.

On December 22, 2006, at the Nokia Theatre Times Square, Cormega appeared on stage at a Nas concert and went on to perform with Nas (and Foxy Brown as well), further evidence that their feud is over.

An album collaboration with Lakey the Kid titled My Brother's Keeper was released independently on August 22, 2006. On November 20, 2007, Cormega finally released his DVD in-the-making Who Am I?. The DVD took over four years of filming of Cormega in all aspects of his life and what others thought of Cormega, unedited. The DVD was released as a soundtrack plus DVD. Cormega intended to release an album which was to be titled Urban Legend before T.I.'s album of the same name was released (Cormega mentions this on the Who Am I DVD, dated circa 2003); the new title was Born and Raised. The album was released October 20, 2009. The first single is called "Journey."

=== 2010s ===
Cormega's latest album, Mega Philosophy, was entirely produced by frequent collaborator Large Professor.

On December 26, 2018, he released his first EP MEGA.

=== 2020s ===
Cormega appeared on Nas' King's Disease in 2020, reuniting with members of the defunct The Firm supergroup.

In November 2022, Cormega released his long-awaited next album, The Realness II, to rave reviews. It served as a sequel to his 2001 debut album The Realness.

== Discography ==
- The Realness (2001)
- The True Meaning (2002)
- The Testament (2005)
- Born and Raised (2009)
- Mega Philosophy (2014)
- The Realness II (2022)

== Film ==
- Who Am I? (2007)
