= Mobb Deep discography =

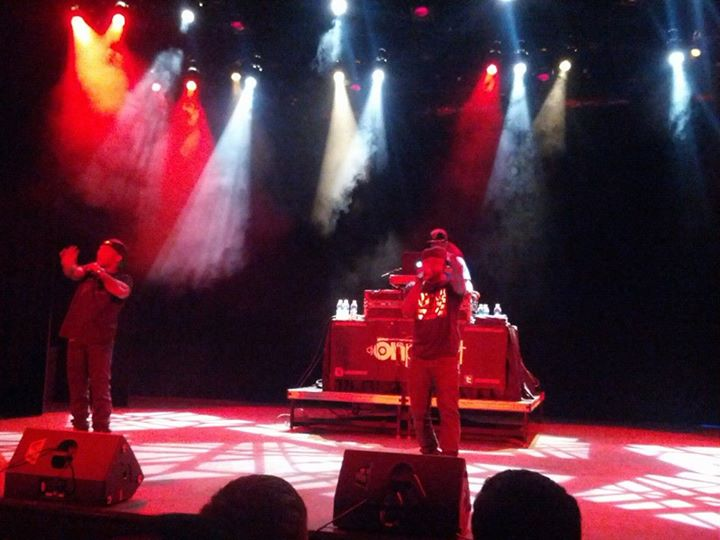
- Mobb Deep performing in 2013
- Studio albums: 9
- Extended plays: 2
- Compilation albums: 5
- Singles: 40
- Music videos: 24
- Mixtapes: 5
- Promotional singles: 7

American hip hop duo Mobb Deep have released nine studio albums, five compilation albums, five mixtapes, two extended play (EP), forty singles (including ten as a featured artist), seven promotional singles and twenty-four music videos.

== Albums ==
=== Studio albums ===
List of studio albums, with selected chart positions and certifications
Title	Album details	Peak chart positions										Certifications
Title	Album details	US	US R&B	US Rap	AUS	CAN	FRA	GER	NLD	SWI	UK	Certifications
Juvenile Hell	Released: April 13, 1993; Label: 4th & B'way; Format: CD, LP, cassette, digital download	—	—	—	—	—	—	—	—	—	—	
The Infamous	Released: April 25, 1995; Label: Loud, RCA; Format: CD, LP, cassette, digital download	18	3	—	—	43	—	—	—	—	111	RIAA: Platinum; BPI: Gold; RMNZ: Gold
Hell on Earth	Released: November 19, 1996; Label: Loud, RCA; Format: CD, LP, cassette, digital download	6	1	—	—	11	—	—	—	—	67	RIAA: Gold; BPI: Silver
Murda Muzik	Released: August 17, 1999; Label: Loud, Columbia; Format: CD, LP, cassette, digital download	3	2	—	—	6	—	67	63	—	81	RIAA: Platinum
Infamy	Released: December 11, 2001; Label: Loud, Columbia; Format: CD, LP, cassette, digital download	22	1	—	—	—	135	—	—	—	189	RIAA: Gold
Amerikaz Nightmare	Released: August 10, 2004; Label: Jive; Format: CD, LP, cassette, digital download	4	2	—	—	12	33	95	—	50	68	
Blood Money	Released: May 2, 2006; Label: G-Unit, Interscope; Format: CD, LP, digital download	3	1	1	81	6	37	38	—	42	70	
The Infamous Mobb Deep	Released: April 1, 2014; Label: Infamous, RED; Format: CD, LP, digital download	49	10	5	—	—	—	—	—	—	—	
Infinite	Released: October 10, 2025; Label: Mass Appeal; Format: CD, LP, cassette, digital download	90	24	17	—	—	—	—	—	77	—	
"—" denotes a recording that did not chart or was not released in that territory.

=== Compilation albums ===
List of compilation albums, with selected chart positions
Title	Album details	Peak chart positions	
Title	Album details	US R&B	US Rap
Infamous Allegiance Pt. 1	Released: 2004 Label: Best Of The Block Entertainment Format: CD, LP, digital download	_	_
Life of the Infamous: The Best of Mobb Deep	Released: October 31, 2006; Label: Loud, Legacy; Format: CD, LP, digital download	45	19
The Infamous Archives	Released: March 13, 2007; Label: Streetcore; Format: CD, LP, digital download	—	—
The Infamous Instrumentals	Released: February 24, 2008; Label: Green Streets; Format: CD, LP, digital download	—	—
The Safe Is Cracked	Released: April 7, 2009; Label: Siccness; Format: CD, digital download	68	—
"—" denotes a recording that did not chart.

== Extended plays ==
List of extended plays, with selected chart positions
Title	EP details	Peak chart positions		
Title	EP details	US Ind.	US R&B	US Rap
Black Cocaine	Released: November 21, 2011; Label: Infamous, RED; Format: CD, digital download	22	33	21
Survival of the Fittest	Released: May 26, 2015; Label: Mobb Deep, LLC; Format: CD, digital download	—	—	—

== Mixtapes ==
List of mixtapes, with selected chart positions
Title	Mixtape details	Peak chart positions					
Title	Mixtape details	US	US Ind.	US R&B	FRA	GER	UK
Free Agents: The Murda Mixtape	Released: April 22, 2003; Label: Landspeed, Koch; Format: CD, LP, digital download	21	1	4	84	84	152
The Mix Tape Before 9/11	Released: October 25, 2004; Label: X-Ray; Format: CD, digital download	—	—	—	—	—	—
The New Mobb Deep (with DJ Whoo Kid and The Alchemist)	Released: 2004; Label: Shadyville; Format: CD, digital download	—	—	—	—	—	—
G-Unit Radio, Pt. 17: Best in the Bizness (with DJ Whoo Kid)	Released: February 27, 2006; Label: G-Unit, Shadyville; Format: CD, digital download	—	—	—	—	—	—
G-Unit Radio, Pt. 20: Best in the Bizness: Part 2 (with DJ Whoo Kid)	Released: April 10, 2006; Label: G-Unit, Shadyville; Format: CD, digital download	—	—	—	—	—	—
"—" denotes a recording that did not chart or was not released in that territory.

== Singles ==
=== As lead artist ===
List of singles as lead artist, with selected chart positions and certifications, showing year released and album name
Title	Year	Peak chart positions						Certifications	Album
Title	Year	US	US R&B	US Rap	AUS	UK	UK R&B	Certifications	Album
"Peer Pressure"	1992	—	—	—	—	—	—		Juvenile Hell
"Hit It from the Back"	1993	—	—	18	—	—	—		Juvenile Hell
"Shook Ones (Part II)"	1995	59	52	7	—	—	—	BPI: Platinum; BVMI: Gold; FIMI: Gold; RMNZ: 3× Platinum	The Infamous
"Survival of the Fittest"	1995	69	60	10	—	—	—	BPI: Silver; RMNZ: Platinum	The Infamous
"Temperature's Rising" (featuring Crystal Johnson)	1995	—	— (Note: "Temperature's Rising" did not enter the Hot R&B/Hip-Hop Songs chart, but peaked at number ten on the Bubbling Under R&B/Hip-Hop Singles chart.)	33	—	—	—		The Infamous
"Give Up the Goods (Just Step)" (featuring Big Noyd)	1996	—	—	—	—	—	—		The Infamous
"Back at You"	1996	—	—	—	—	—	—		Sunset Park (soundtrack)
"Front Lines (Hell on Earth)"	1996	— (Note: "Front Lines (Hell on Earth)" did not enter the Billboard Hot 100, but peaked at number nine on the Bubbling Under Hot 100 Singles chart.)	57	13	—	—	—	RMNZ: Gold	Hell on Earth
"G.O.D. Pt. III"	1997	— (Note: "G.O.D. Pt. III" did not enter the Billboard Hot 100, but peaked at number one on the Bubbling Under Hot 100 Singles chart.)	64	18	—	—	—		Hell on Earth
"Hoodlum" (with Big Noyd and Rakim)	1997	—	— (Note: "Hoodlum" did not enter the Hot R&B/Hip-Hop Songs chart, but peaked at number one on the Bubbling Under R&B/Hip-Hop Singles chart.)	29	—	—	—		Hoodlum (soundtrack)
"Deadly Zone" (with Bounty Killer and Big Noyd)	1998	—	—	—	—	—	—		Blade (soundtrack)
"Quiet Storm" (solo and remix featuring Lil' Kim)	1999	— (Note: "Quiet Storm" did not enter the Billboard Hot 100, but peaked at number six on the Bubbling Under Hot 100 Singles chart.)	35	17	—	—	—		Murda Muzik
"It's Mine" (featuring Nas)	1999	—	71	25	—	—	—		Murda Muzik
"U.S.A. (Aiight Then)"	2000	—	95	36	—	—	—		Murda Muzik
"Burn" (featuring Big Noyd and Vita)	2001	99	56	14	—	—	—		Infamy
"Hey Luv (Anything)" (featuring 112)	2002	58	32	—	—	—	—		Infamy
"Get Away"	2002	—	75	—	—	—	—		Infamy
"Pray for Me" (featuring Lil' Mo)	2002	—	—	—	—	—	—		Infamy
"Gangstaz Roll"	2003	—	98	—	—	127	—		Non-album single
"Got It Twisted"	2004	64	23	18	—	—	—		Amerikaz Nightmare
"Real Gangstaz" (featuring Lil Jon)	2004	—	49	—	—	—	—		Amerikaz Nightmare
"Throw Your Hands (In the Air)"	2004	—	—	—	—	—	—		Amerikaz Nightmare
"Win or Lose"	2004	—	—	—	—	—	—		Amerikaz Nightmare
"Have a Party" (with Nate Dogg and 50 Cent)	2006	— (Note: "Have a Party" did not enter the Billboard Hot 100, but peaked at number five on the Bubbling Under Hot 100 Singles chart.)	49	23	—	—	—		Get Rich or Die Tryin' (soundtrack)
"Put Em in Their Place"	2006	—	59	—	60	75	9		Blood Money
"Give It to Me" (featuring Young Buck)	2006	—	— (Note: "Give It to Me" did not enter the Hot R&B/Hip-Hop Songs chart, but peaked at number 13 on the Bubbling Under R&B/Hip-Hop Singles chart.)	—	—	—	—		Blood Money
"Creep" (featuring 50 Cent)	2006	—	—	—	—	—	—		Blood Money
"Love Y'all More"	2012	—	—	—	—	—	—		Non-album singles
"Dog Shit" (featuring Nas)	2012	—	—	—	—	—	—		Non-album singles
"Taking You Off Here"	2014	—	—	—	—	—	—		The Infamous Mobb Deep
"Say Something"	2014	—	—	—	—	—	—		The Infamous Mobb Deep
"Against the World"	2025	—	—	—	—	—	—		Infinite
"Taj Mahal"	2025	—	—	—	—	—	—		Infinite
"Down for You" (featuring Nas and Jorja Smith)	2025	—	—	—	—	—	—		Infinite
"Look at Me" (featuring Clipse)	2025	—	—	—	—	—	—		Infinite
"—" denotes a recording that did not chart or was not released in that territory.

=== As featured artist ===
List of singles as featured artist, with selected chart positions and certifications, showing year released and album name
Title	Year	Peak chart positions										Certifications	Album
Title	Year	US	US R&B	US Rap	AUS	BEL (FL)	GER	IRL	NZ	SWI	UK	Certifications	Album
"Microphone Master (Remix)" (Das EFX featuring Mobb Deep)	1995	86	39	5	—	—	—	—	—	—	—		Hold It Down
"War's On" (The Almighty RSO featuring Mobb Deep)†	1996	—	—	—	—	—	—	—	—	—	—		Original Gangstas (soundtrack) / Doomsday: Forever RSO
"L.A., L.A." (Capone-N-Noreaga featuring Mobb Deep and Tragedy Khadafi)	1996	—	— (Note: "L.A., L.A." did not enter the Hot R&B/Hip-Hop Songs chart, but peaked at number two on the Bubbling Under R&B/Hip-Hop Singles chart.)	—	—	—	—	—	—	—	—		The War Report
"It's the Pee '97" (PMD featuring Mobb Deep)†	1997	—	82	—	—	—	—	—	—	—	—		Bu$ine$$ I$ Bu$ine$$
"The Roof (Back in Time) [Extended Mobb Deep Remix]" (Mariah Carey featuring Mobb Deep)	1998	—	—	—	—	—	—	—	—	—	87		Butterfly
"No Exit" (Loud Allstars Remix) (Blondie featuring Mobb Deep, U-God and Inspectah Deck)	1999	—	—	—	—	—	—	—	—	—	—		Non-album single
"Da Bridge 2001" (as part of QB's Finest)	2000	—	96	17	—	—	—	—	—	—	—		Nas & Ill Will Records Presents QB's Finest
"Best Love Story" (D'Mello featuring Mobb Deep)	2002	—	— (Note: "Best Love Story" did not enter the Hot R&B/Hip-Hop Songs chart, but peaked at number 21 on the Bubbling Under R&B/Hip-Hop Singles chart.)	—	—	—	—	—	—	—	—		Best Love Story
"Outta Control" (Remix) (50 Cent featuring Mobb Deep)	2005	6	11	5	15	10	8	5	12	10	7	RIAA: Platinum; BPI: Gold; RMNZ: Gold	The Massacre
"Necessary" (Ron Browz featuring Mobb Deep)	2011	—	—	—	—	—	—	—	—	—	—		Non-album single
"Street Certified" (M.O.P. featuring Mobb Deep)	2014	—	—	—	—	—	—	—	—	—	—		Street Certified
"—" denotes a recording that did not chart or was not released in that territory.

=== Promotional singles ===
List of promotional singles, showing year released and album name
Title	Year	Album
"Shook Ones"	1994	Non-album single
"Where Ya At" (with Chuck D, Ice Cube, Ice-T, Kam, RZA, Shorty, Smooth B.)	1995	One Million Strong
"Still Shinin'"	1995	Hell on Earth
"Drop a Gem on 'Em"	1996	Hell on Earth
"Where Ya From" (featuring 8Ball)	1999	Murda Muzik
"The Jump Off" (Remix) (Lil' Kim featuring Mobb Deep and Mr. Cheeks)	2003	Non-album single
"When U Hear the"	2004	Amerikaz Nightmare

== Other charted songs ==
List of other charted songs, with selected chart positions, showing year released and album name
Title	Year	Peak chart positions	Album
Title	Year	US Bub. R&B	Album
"Pearly Gates" (featuring 50 Cent)	2006	23	Blood Money

== Guest appearances ==
List of non-single guest appearances, with other performing artists, showing year released and album name † = Havoc production
Title	Year	Other artist(s)	Album
"Bloodshed and War"	1995	Da Youngsta's	I'll Make U Famous
"Like This and Like That" (All Star Mix)	1995	Monica	"Like This and Like That" single
"Live Nigga Rap"†	1996	Nas	It Was Written
"Eyes May Shine" (Remix)†	1996	Xzibit	"Eyes May Shine" single
"Hollow Tips"	1996	Wiseguys	In tha Company of Killaz
"Street Life"	1996	ACD	America Is Dying Slowly
"Recognize & Realize: Part 2"†	1996	Big Noyd	Episodes of a Hustla
"Legal Money"†	1996	Shaquille O'Neal	You Can't Stop the Reign
"Know da Game"	1997	Frankie Cutlass, Kool G Rap, M.O.P.	Politics & Bullshit
"It Could Happen to You"	1997	DJ Muggs	Soul Assassins, Chapter 1
"Rare Species (Modus Operandi)"†	1997	—N/a	Soul in the Hole (soundtrack)
"Mobb of Steel"†	1997	—N/a	Steel (soundtrack)
"Nessun Dorma"	1997	None	The Rapsody Overture
"Baby Maybe"	1998	Miss Jones	The Other Woman
"Glaciers of Ice (Freestyle)"	1998	Funkmaster Flex, Big Noyd	The Mix Tape, Vol. III
"Feel My Gat Blow"†	1998	—N/a	Slam (soundtrack)
"Killaz Theme"†	1998	Cormega	The Testament
"Play IV Keeps"†	1998	Method Man, Inspectah Deck, Streetlife, Hell Razah	Tical 2000: Judgement Day
"The Professional"	1998	DJ Clue?, Big Noyd	The Professional
"Infamous"†	1999	Charli Baltimore, Mike Delorian	Cold as Ice
"Deep Inside (Remix)"	1999	Mary J. Blige	"Deep Inside" single
"Nobody Likes Me"†	1999	—N/a	Violator: The Album
"Allustrious"†	1999	—N/a	The Corruptor (soundtrack) / Murda Muzik
"Family"	1999	Nas	Nastradamus
"Tonight"	1999	The Notorious B.I.G., Joe Hooker	Born Again
"Never Goin' Back"†	2000	None	Any Given Sunday (soundtrack)
'Shook Ones (Pt. 2)"	2000	Everlast	Loud Rocks
"Survival of the Fittest"	2000	Sick of It All	Loud Rocks
"Queens' Finest"†	2000	Capone-N-Noreaga	The Reunion
"The Best of Queens (It's Us)"	2001	DJ Clue	The Professional 2
"Holdin' Down"	2001	Jinusean, Perry	The Reign
"Connected"	2001	Tha Eastsidaz, Kokane	Duces 'n Trayz: The Old Fashioned Way
"Play"†	2001	None	Hardball (soundtrack)
"Get Shot the Fuck Up"†	2003	DJ Kay Slay, Big Noyd	The Streetsweeper, Vol. 1
"Shoot 'Em Up (Bang Bang) Part 2"	2003	Big Noyd	Only the Strong
"The Jump Off (Remix)"	2003	Lil' Kim, Mr. Cheeks	"The Jump Off" single
"One of Ours"†	2004	None	Barbershop 2: Back in Business (soundtrack)
"It's a Craze"	2004	The Alchemist	1st Infantry
"Playa"	2004	Nelly	Sweat
"En Bas"	2005	Kayna Samet	Entre Deux Je
"L'Ecole Du Crime"	2005	113	113 Degrés
"Beef"†	2005	The Notorious B.I.G.	Duets: The Final Chapter
"Okay Dun"	2005	Clinton Sparks	Maybe You Been Brainwashed
"Bidadidat"	2005	Clinton Sparks	Maybe You Been Brainwashed
"World Premiere"	2006	Bars & Hooks	The Most Notorious
"The Gold"	2006	DJ Clue	The Professional 3
"Get Clapped"	2006	Lloyd Banks	Rotten Apple
"Project Niggas"	2006	Young Buck	Chronic 2006
"Heat"	2009	Recordkingz	Heavyweight
"Wobble"†	2009	Capone-N-Noreaga	Channel 10
"Boy Back Up"	2010	DMX	Mixtape
"Road to Riches"	2010	Raekwon	None
"Gangstaz Only"	2011	L.E.P. Bogus Boys	None
"Body Bag"	2011	Tony Yayo	El Chapo
"Chinese Marines"	2012	Raekwon	Unexpected Victory
"Duel to the Death"	2012	Vinnie Paz	God of the Serengeti
"Play the Record"	2012	40 Glocc, Racq Dolo	Seedz of Makaveli
"Aim, Shoot"	2013	Papoose	The Nacirema Dream
"Dispensary"	2013	Wyclef Jean	April Showers
"How It Goes"	2013	The Alchemist, Chinky	The Cutting Room Floor 3
"Hard Life"	2016	The Lox	Filthy America... It's Beautiful
"Try My Hand"	2017	The Alchemist	The Good Book, Vol. 2

== Music videos ==
=== As lead artist ===
List of music videos as lead artist, with directors, showing year released
Title	Year	Director(s)
"Peer Pressure"	1992	Frank Sacramento
"Hit It from the Back"	1993	Unknown
"Shook Ones (Part II)"	1994	Froi Cuenta
"Survival of the Fittest"	1995	Musa Moore
"Give Up the Goods (Just Step)" (featuring Big Noyd)	1996	Froi Cuenta
"Back at You"	1996	Diane Martel
"Front Lines (Hell on Earth)"	1996	Alan Ferguson
"G.O.D. Pt. III"	1997	Steve Carr
"Hoodlum" (with Big Noyd and Rakim)	1997	Unknown
"Deadly Zone" (with Bounty Killer)	1998	Unknown
"Quiet Storm"	1999	Joseph Kahn
"It's Mine" (featuring Nas)	1999	Hype Williams
"Quiet Storm" (Remix) (featuring Lil' Kim)	1999	Hype Williams
"U.S.A. (Aiight Then)"	1999	Unknown
"The Learning (Burn)" (featuring Big Noyd and Vita)	2001	Diane Martel
"Hey Luv (Anything)" (featuring 112)	2002	Little X
"Get Away"	2002	Diane Martel
"Got It Twisted"	2004	Benny Boom
"Real Gangstaz" (featuring Lil Jon)	2004	Benny Boom
"Cobra"	2005	Akwesi
"Have a Party" (featuring Nate Dogg and 50 Cent)	2006	Jessy Terrero
"Put Em In Their Place"	2006	The Saline Project
"The Infamous" (featuring 50 Cent)	2006	Dan the Man
"Give It to Me" (featuring Young Buck)	2006	Jessy Terrero
"Last Days" (featuring Bounty Killer)	2011	Unknown
"All a Dream" (featuring The Lox)	2014	Unknown

=== As featured artist ===
List of music videos as featured artist, with directors, showing year released
Title	Year	Director(s)
"Microphone Master (Remix)" (Das EFX featuring Mobb Deep)	1995	Unknown
"War's On" (Almighty R.S.O. featuring Mobb Deep)	1996	
"LA LA" (Capone-N-Noreaga featuring Mobb Deep and Tragedy Khadafi)	1996	Unknown
"The Roof (Back in Time) [Extended Mobb Deep Remix] (Mariah Carey featuring Mobb Deep)	1998	Diane Martel
"No Exit" (Loud Allstars Remix) (Blondie featuring Mobb Deep, U-God and Inspectah Deck)	1999	Unknown
"Da Bridge 2001" (as part of QB's Finest)	2000	Nick Quested
"Best Love Story" (D'Mello featuring Mobb Deep)	2002	Unknown
"Outta Control" (Remix) (50 Cent featuring Mobb Deep)	2005	Jessy Terrero
"Henny (Remix)" (Mack Wilds featuring Mobb Deep, French Montana & Busta Rhymes)	2014	Unknown
