= Life of the Infamous: The Best of Mobb Deep =

Greatest hits album by Mobb Deep
- Released: October 31, 2006
- Genre: East Coast hip hop
- Label: Loud/Legacy
- Producers: Havoc; The Alchemist

Mobb Deep chronology
The Mix Tape Before 9/11 (2004)	Life of the Infamous: The Best of Mobb Deep (2006)	The Infamous Archives (2007)

Professional ratings
Review scores
Source	Rating
AllMusic	4/5 stars
The Encyclopedia of Popular Music	4/5 stars

Life of the Infamous: The Best of Mobb Deep is the greatest hits album from Queensbridge rap duo Mobb Deep, made up of rappers Prodigy and Havoc. It contains songs dating back to their 1993 debut album, Juvenile Hell, through their 2004 album, Amerikaz Nightmare. No Blood Money songs are on the album since those tracks are owned by Universal Music Group, not Sony Music Entertainment, the label that released this album. The disc includes "Blood Money" and "Go Head," two previously unreleased tracks. "Keep It Thoro" is the only song featured on a non-Mobb Deep album (Prodigy's H.N.I.C.).

== Track listing ==
No.	Title	Producer(s)	Length
1.	"Hit It from the Back" (from Juvenile Hell)	Mobb Deep	4:11
2.	"Survival of the Fittest" (from The Infamous)	Havoc	3:42
3.	"Shook Ones Pt. II" (from The Infamous)	Havoc	4:23
4.	"Temperature’s Rising" (featuring Crystal Johnson) (from The Infamous)	Havoc, The Abstract and Mobb Deep (co.)	4:59
5.	"Get Dealt With" (from Hell on Earth)	Havoc	3:53
6.	"Quiet Storm" (Remix) (featuring Lil' Kim) (from Murda Muzik)	Havoc, Jonathan Williams	3:54
7.	"Keep It Thoro" (from H.N.I.C.)	The Alchemist	3:06
8.	"G.O.D. Pt. III" (from Hell On Earth)	Havoc	5:14
9.	"Hell on Earth (Front Lines)" (from Hell On Earth)	Havoc	4:33
10.	"Hey Luv (Anything)" (featuring 112) (from Infamy)	Havoc	3:57
11.	"Get Away" (from Infamy)	Ez Elpee	3:33
12.	"The Learning (Burn)" (featuring Noyd and Vita) (from Infamy)	Havoc	4:11
13.	"Got It Twisted" (from Amerikaz Nightmare)	The Alchemist	3:38
14.	"Real Gangstaz" (featuring Lil Jon) (from Amerikaz Nightmare)	Lil Jon	4:04
15.	"Win or Lose" (from Amerikaz Nightmare)	The Alchemist	3:12
16.	"Blood Money" (Previously unreleased)	Havoc	4:42
17.	"Go Head" (Previously unreleased)	Havoc	4:01

== Charts ==
Chart (2006)	Peak position
US Top R&B/Hip-Hop Albums (Billboard)	45
