= Loud Records discography =

The following is a list of albums released by the record label Loud Records.

== 1990s ==
=== 1992 ===
- Twista (credited as Tung Twista) — Runnin' Off at da Mouth

=== 1993 ===
- The Alkaholiks — 21 & Over
- Mad Kap — Look Ma Duke, No Hands
- Wu-Tang Clan — Enter the Wu-Tang (36 Chambers)

=== 1994 ===
- Fresh (Music Inspired by the Film)
- Loud '95 Nudder Butters

=== 1995 ===
- The Alkaholiks — Coast II Coast
- Funkmaster Flex — The Mix Tape Volume 1 (60 Minutes of Funk)
- Mobb Deep — The Infamous
- Raekwon — Only Built 4 Cuban Linx...

=== 1996 ===
- All That: The Album (Nick)
- Cella Dwellas — Realms 'n Reality
- Delinquent Habits — Delinquent Habits
- Mobb Deep — Hell on Earth
- Off Da Hook — Off Da Hook
- Sadat X — Wild Cowboys
- Xzibit — At the Speed of Life

=== 1997 ===
- The Alkaholiks — Likwidation
- Bring Da Ruckus/A Loud Story
- Adriana Evans — Adriana Evans
- Funkmaster Flex — The Mix Tape Volume II (60 Minutes of Funk)
- Hoodlum (Music Inspired by the Motion Picture) (Interscope)
- Yvette Michele — My Dream
- Soul in the Hole (Relativity)
- Wu-Tang Clan — Wu-Tang Forever

=== 1998 ===
- Big Pun — Capital Punishment (Terror Squad)
- Davina — Best of Both Worlds
- Delinquent Habits — Here Come the Horns
- Funkmaster Flex — 60 Minutes of Funk (The Mixtape Volume III: The Final Chapter)
- Pete Rock — Soul Survivor
- Xzibit — 40 Dayz & 40 Nightz

=== 1999 ===
- The Beatnuts — A Musical Massacre (Relativity/Epic)
- Inspectah Deck — Uncontrolled Substance (Relativity)
- Mobb Deep — Murda Muzik
- No Good — Lizard Lizard
- Project Pat — Ghetty Green (Hypnotize Minds)
- Raekwon — Immobilarity
- Tash — Rap Life

== 2000s ==
=== 2000 ===
- Big Pun — Yeeeah Baby (Terror Squad)
- dead prez — Let's Get Free
- Funkmaster Flex — 60 Minutes of Funk, Volume IV: The Mixtape
- L.V. — How Long
- Loud Rocks
- Louder Than Ever Volume 1
- Luke — Luke's Freak Fest 2000 (Luke)
- Hypnotize Camp Posse — Three 6 Mafia Presents: Hypnotize Camp Posse (Hypnotize Minds)
- M.O.P. — Warriorz (Relativity)
- Prodigy — H.N.I.C. (Violator/Relativity/Infamous)
- Three 6 Mafia — When the Smoke Clears: Sixty 6, Sixty 1 (Hypnotize Minds)
- Wu-Tang Clan — The W
- Xzibit — Restless (Open Bar/SRC/Epic)

=== 2001 ===
- The Alkaholiks (credited as Tha Liks) — X.O. Experience
- The Beatnuts — Take It or Squeeze It (Epic)
- Big Pun — Endangered Species
- DJ Red Alert — Presents... Beats, Rhymes & Battles Vol. 1
- Gangsta Boo — Both Worlds *69 (Hypnotize Minds/RED)
- Killarmy — Fear, Love & War (36/Relativity)
- Mobb Deep — Infamy (Infamous)
- Project Pat — Mista Don't Play: Everythangs Workin (Hypnotize Minds/RED)
- Three 6 Mafia — Choices: The Album (Relativity/Hypnotize Minds)
- Violator: The Album, V2.0 (Violator)
- Wu-Tang Clan — Iron Flag

=== 2002 ===
- The Beatnuts — Classic Nuts Volume 1 (Epic)
- The Early Daze
- Lil' Flip — Undaground Legend (Sucka Free)
- Project Pat — Layin' da Smack Down (Hypnotize Minds)
- The X-Ecutioners — Built from Scratch
- Xzibit — Man vs. Machine (Open Bar)
