= Shook Ones =

Shook Ones may refer to:

- Shook Ones (band), an American musical group
- "Shook Ones" (song), a 1994 song by Mobb Deep
- "Shook Ones, Part II", a 1995 song by Mobb Deep
- "Shook Ones Pt. II", an episode of American TV series Euphoria
