= The Last Shall Be First (Dwellas album) =

Studio album by Dwellas
- Released: September 26, 2000
- Recorded: 1999–2000; 1997 (Main Aim)
- Genre: Hip hop
- Label: Loud
- Producers: Nick Wiz, Rockwilder, Large Professor, Ayatollah, A.D.

Dwellas chronology
| Realms 'n Reality (1996) | The Last Shall Be First (2000) |

Professional ratings
Review scores
| Source | Rating |
|---|---|
| Allmusic | 4/5 stars |

The Last Shall Be First is the second and final album released by rap group, The Dwellas (Formally Cella Dwellas). It was released on September 26, 2000, and like the group's previous album was released through Loud Records and mostly produced by Nick Wiz, with additional production by Rockwilder, Large Professor and Ayatollah. The album was met with positive reviews, but it was not a commercial success, not making it to any Billboard charts. "Main Aim" was originally a track on the Soul in the Hole soundtrack, but was also included as a bonus track on this album.

== Track listing ==
| No. | Title | Length |
|---|---|---|
| 1. | "Leakage" | 3:05 |
| 2. | "Dwellas" | 3:06 |
| 3. | "The Last Shall Be First" (Featuring Large Professor) | 3:10 |
| 4. | "Stand Up" (Released as single for airplay and promotion by Loud in '98) | 3:39 |
| 5. | "I'm Tellin' U" | 3:48 |
| 6. | "Verbal Slaughter" (Featuring Inspectah Deck) | 3:38 |
| 7. | "On the Run" | 3:52 |
| 8. | "Da Ruckus" | 3:36 |
| 9. | "Ready to Rock" | 3:54 |
| 10. | "You've Been Warned" | 3:24 |
| 11. | "Frontline" (Featuring Cocoa Brovas) | 3:54 |
| 12. | "Once Again" | 3:58 |
| 13. | "Ill Collabo" (Featuring Organized Konfusion) | 4:20 |
| 14. | "Game of Death" | 4:39 |
| 15. | "Main Aim" (from the Soul in the Hole soundtrack) | 3:31 |
