= Symptomatic of a Greater Ill =

Studio album by Darc Mind
- Released: August 29, 2006
- Recorded: 1995–1997
- Studios: Island Digital; Such a Sound; D&D Recording Studios
- Genre: Underground hip-hop
- Length: 43:00
- Label: Anticon
- Producers: G.M. Web D, X-Ray, C. Escalante, Nick Wiz

Darc Mind chronology
Symptomatic of a Greater Ill (2006)	Bipolar (2006)

Professional ratings
Review scores
Source	Rating
AllHipHop	4/5
AllMusic	4/5 stars
Dusted Magazine	favorable
HipHopSite.Com	4/5 stars
IGN	7.8/10
KEXP-FM	favorable
PopMatters	7/10 stars
The Skinny	5/5 stars
Textura	favorable
URB	4/5 stars

Symptomatic of a Greater Ill is the debut studio album by American hip-hop duo Darc Mind. It was released on Anticon on August 29, 2006. It peaked at number 29 on the Dusted Top 40 Radio Chart.

== Release ==
Symptomatic of a Greater Ill was recorded between 1995 and 1997 for Loud Records. However, the closing of the label shelved the album for years. In 2006, it was released on Anticon.

== Critical reception ==
Bram Gieben of The Skinny gave the album 5 stars out of 5, calling it "[a] lost classic, resurfacing at just the right time." Marisa Brown of AllMusic said: "It's a great record, thoughtful and aware yet still laid-back and fun, and though it took a while to be released, it's better late than never to hear this, to be reminded of everything that hip-hop can be, both in the past and hopefully, continuing on into the future." Mike Schiller of PopMatters called it "one of 2006's absolutely essential hip-hop releases".

== Track listing ==
All tracks are written by K. Holland and R. Davis.

No.	Title	Producer(s)	Length
1.	"Visions of a Blur"	G.M. Web D	4:55
2.	"U Da One"	G.M. Web D, C. Escalante	4:34
3.	"Seize the Phenom"	G.M. Web D	4:19
4.	"Knight of the Round Table"	G.M. Web D	2:03
5.	"I'm Ill"	X-Ray	4:07
6.	"Covert Op"	X-Ray	3:48
7.	"Give Me Time"	G.M. Web D	4:19
8.	"BMOC"	G.M. Web D	5:09
9.	"Fever Pitch"	G.M. Web D	3:50
10.	"Rhyme Zone"	X-Ray	2:04
11.	"Outside Looking In"	X-Ray, Nick Wiz	3:56

== Personnel ==
Credits adapted from liner notes.

- Kev Roc – vocals
- G.M. Web D – production (1, 3, 4, 7, 8, 9), co-production (2)
- X-Ray – production (5, 6, 10), co-production (11), mixing
- C. Escalante – production (2)
- Nick Wiz – production (11)
- Leo Swift – engineering
- Tony Smilos – engineering
- Shlomo Sonnenfeld – engineering
- Mike Davis – art direction, design
- Wes Winship – art direction, design
