= Rich Isaacson =

American music executive (born 1964)

- Born: Rich Isaacson; October 18, 1964 (age 62); Merrick, Nassau County, Long Island, New York, U.S.
- Occupation: Music entrepreneur
- Years active: 1991-present
- Labels: Loud Records, SRC Records
- Website: http://www.rientertainment.net/

Rich Isaacson (born October 18, 1964) is an American music executive, entrepreneur, and public servant. He is the co-founder and former President of LOUD Records and SRC, and currently runs RI Entertainment, an artist management and consulting company. Over his career, Isaacson has been associated with artists such as Wu-Tang Clan, MIKA, Akon, Gustavo Santaolalla, Charles Bradley, Mobb Deep, Melanie Fiona, and Three 6 Mafia. He also served as Executive Vice President and General Manager of Def Jam Recordings from 2018 to 2021. He was portrayed by Jared Zirilli in the Hulu Original Series “Wu Tang: An American Saga”.

== Early life and education ==
Isaacson was born in Brooklyn, New York, and raised in Merrick, Long Island. Isaacson is the son of a toy manufacturer father and doctor’s office administrator mother. He attended Cornell University’s School of Industrial and Labor Relations before earning a Juris Doctor degree from the University of Pennsylvania. He began his career as a litigation associate at the prominent New York law firm Shea & Gould, before leaving the position in 1992 to pursue an endeavor in the music industry with childhood friend Steven Rifkind.

== Loud Records and SRC ==
In 1992, Isaacson partnered with childhood friend Steve Rifkind to build LOUD Records and its companion marketing firm SRC. Together, they grew the label from a small production deal with only $3000 in monthly funding from BMG’s American startup label Zoo Entertainment, into a $100 million joint venture, signing iconic acts including Wu-Tang Clan, Mobb Deep, Big Pun, Raekwon, Xzibit, and Three6Mafia.

Isaacson, the man behind the scenes, ran the day to day operations of both LOUD and SRC and was responsible for bringing the street team concept conceived by Rifkind to market rap records, to corporate America. He also led the initial groundbreaking negotiation that brought Wu Tang Clan to LOUD Records by enabling the individual members to sign with other labels—a first in the industry. The SRC corporate street team model was adopted by major brands Nike, Pepsi, Tommy Hilfiger, Starter, Miramax Films, Hugo Boss and many others.

In 2002, Sony Music acquired LOUD and merged it with Relativity Records, where Isaacson oversaw the merger of LOUD to become a fully staffed independent label and oversaw the emergence of Relativity artists The Beatnuts, MOP and 36 Mafia as seminal groups in the hip hop community.

== The Fuerte Group ==
After LOUD, Isaacson co-founded The Fuerte Group, a music marketing, management and record label with Jerry Blair, former Executive Vice President of SONY Music. The Fuerte Group mission was to focus on the emerging Latin urban market. There, Isaacson executive produced Motown Remixed Volume 2 and Sise’s More Shine album and brought street team tactics and strategy to Fuerte’s client base which included Coca-Cola, Heineken, WWE, Western Union and Universal Music Group among others.

== Return to SRC and RI Entertainment ==
Isaacson later reunited with Rifkind who had launched a new joint venture SRC Records at Universal, where he worked with artists including Akon, David Banner, Melanie Fiona, Shontelle and Asher Roth. After SRC was purchased outright by Universal, Isaacson put his full focus on RI Entertainment.

== RI Entertainment ==
At RI Entertainment, Isaacson developed a boutique and niche international music management company with clients as diverse as global superstar MIKA, Daptone Records soul sensation Charles Bradley, 2 time Academy Award winning composer and musician Gustavo Santaolalla, Nashville based rock group SafetySuit, and Canadian platinum star Bobby Bazini.

== Def Jam Recordings (2018–2021) ==
In January 2018, Isaacson was named Executive Vice President and General Manager of Def Jam Recordings. He oversaw the operations of the iconic Hip Hop label and oversaw the rollout of several number one albums from Kanye West, Jhene Aiko, Logic, and Justin Bieber, as well as high profile releases from hip-hop luminaries like 2 Chain, Pusha T, YG, Big Sean and Jeezy.

== Publishing ==
Isaacson is active in music publishing through Merokee Music, a joint venture with Rondor Music, and VOCO Publishing, which owns rights to Xzibit’s early works. Notable copyrights include Rihanna’s “Man Down.”

== Legacy and Current Work ==
Isaacson continues to manage artists through RI Entertainment, with a focus on developing visionary, artist-driven careers. His client, MIKA, continues to work across music, film, television, and fashion; most recently returned as a mentor on Season 3 of the hit UK TV show The Piano and joined Spain’s La Voz as a coach in 2025. MIKA released his latest album Hyperlove, which entered the UK album chart at number 14 and was top ten in France. He has just launched a sold out European Arena tour and will tour the US in May of 2026.

In March of 2025, Isaacson was appointed Village Justice in his hometown of Tarrytown, NY and was subsequently elected for a 2 year term in a special election in November of 2025 to complete the term of his predecessor, who was elected to the New York State Supreme Court.
