= Darc Mind =

American hip-hop group

- Origin: Queens, New York
- Genre: Underground hip-hop
- Years active: 1990–2025
- Labels: Mindbenda Recordings, Anticon, Loud Records
- Past members: Kev Roc; X-Ray Da Mindbenda
- Website: www.mindbenda.com

Darc Mind was an underground hip-hop duo from Queens, New York. It consisted of rapper Kev Roc and producer X-Ray Da Mindbenda.

== History ==
Darc Mind recorded their debut album Symptomatic of a Greater Ill for Loud Records between 1995 and 1997. The duo released the single "Outside Looking In" in 1996. "Visions of a Blur," a track from the album, appeared on the Soul in the Hole soundtrack in 1997. However, Symptomatic of a Greater Ill had never seen the light of day until it was released on Anticon in 2006.

Darc Mind performed the song "Outside Looking In" live on KEXP-FM at Gigantic Studios on October 30, 2006. In the same year, the duo released Bipolar on Mindbenda Recordings.

X-Ray Da Mindbenda died on January 6, 2025.

== Discography ==
=== Albums ===
- Symptomatic of a Greater Ill (Anticon, 2006)
- Bipolar (Mindbenda, 2006)
- What Happened to the Art? (Mindbenda, 2019)

=== EPs ===
- Soulfood (Mindbenda, 2005)
- Antediluvian Vol. 1 (Mindbenda, 2013)
- Antediluvian Vol. 2 (Dope Folks, 2014)
- Darc Mind Wuz Here (Mindbenda, 2022)

=== Singles ===
- "Outside Looking In" (Loud, 1996)
- "Visions of Blur" (Mindbenda, 2001)

=== Compilation appearances ===
- "Visions of a Blur" on Soul in the Hole (1997)
- "On the Ropes" on On the Ropes (1999)
- "You Da One" on Monster Mixes Vol #1 (2002)
- "Covert Op" on Monsta Mixes 2 (2002)
