= The Last Shall Be First =

The Last Shall Be First may refer to:

- The Last Shall Be First (Sunz of Man album), 1998
- The Last Shall Be First (Dwellas album), 2000
- "The Last Shall Be First", an episode of Generation (TV series)

== See also ==
- Parable of the Workers in the Vineyard, from the Gospel of Matthew, the origin of the phrase
