= Temperature's Rising (song) =

Single by Mobb Deep featuring Crystal Johnson

from the album The Infamous
- Released: September 18, 1995
- Recorded: 1995
- Genre: East Coast hip hop; gangsta rap
- Length: 5:00
- Label: Loud
- Songwriters: Kejuan Muchita; Albert Johnson; Jonathan Davis; Patrice Rushen; Freddie Washington
- Producers: Q-Tip; Mobb Deep (co.)

Mobb Deep singles chronology
"Survival of the Fittest" (1995)	"Temperature's Rising" (1995)	"Give Up the Goods (Just Step)" (1996)

"Temperature's Rising" is the third single from Mobb Deep's second album, The Infamous. Produced by Q-Tip, the song features R&B singer Crystal Johnson and contains a sample of "Where There Is Love" by Patrice Rushen.

== Background ==
The song was written in the form of a letter to an associate that is hiding from the police, who went by the name Killa Black, who was also the older brother of Havoc. Killa Black, according to Prodigy in his 2011 autobiography My Infamous Life: The Autobiography of Mobb Deep's Prodigy, murdered a man over Walkman speakers, and Havoc hid Killa Black's gun in his basket of clothes. In the song, the narrator reveals that he is covering up evidence of his imprisoned friend's criminal actions, and speaks of his paranoia, fearing that the police are closing in on him.

After being released, Killa Black became a Muslim. A few years after the song was released, Killa Black committed suicide, in his mother's bathroom, from a self-inflicted gunshot wound to the head after coming home for the murder that is mentioned in the song. Prior to his suicide, he had been committed to a psychiatric hospital.

The B-side is "Give Up the Goods (Just Step)".

There is a remix to the single, also produced by Q-Tip, that utilizes the same Patrice Rushen sample that is used on the album version. The original version of the song was produced by Mobb Deep.

== Track listing ==
Side A

1. "Temperature's Rising" [Remix]
2. "Temperature's Rising" [LP Version]

Side B

1. "Give Up the Goods (Just Step)" [LP Version]
2. "Give Up the Goods (Just Step)" [Instrumental]
