= Soul in the Hole (soundtrack) =

Soundtrack album by Various artists
- Released: July 29, 1997
- Recorded: 1996–1997
- Studios: Troposphere Studios (Livingston, New Jersey); D&D Studios (New York City); Unique Recording Studios (New York City); Mystic Studios (Staten Island, New York); Da Cella (Teaneck, New Jersey); Mirror Image Studios (New York City); The Cutting Room Studios (New York City); Homeboy Studios (New York City)
- Genre: Hip hop
- Length: 65:28
- Labels: Loud Records; Relativity Records
- Producers: Da Heads, RZA, DJ Premier, M.O.P., Young Lord, Mel-Man, Nick Wiz, Mobb Deep, No I.D., Vance Wright, Sean Cane, Black Moes-Art, GM Web D, Organized Konfusion, DJ Ogee

Professional ratings
Review scores
Source	Rating
AllMusic	4/5 stars
RapReviews.com	7.5/10

Soul in the Hole is the soundtrack album to the 1997 film of the same name. It was released through Loud Records on July 29, 1997. It peaked at number 73 on the Billboard 200 chart and number 13 on the Top R&B/Hip-Hop Albums chart. The tracks "You Ain't A Killer" and "Los Angeles Times" later appeared on Big Pun's album Capital Punishment and Xzibit's album 40 Dayz & 40 Nightz respectively.

== Critical reception ==
In 2012, Complex placed it at number 20 on the "25 Best Hip-Hop Movie Soundtracks of All Time" list.

== Track listing ==
Soul in the Hole
No.	Title	Writer(s)	Producer(s)	Length
1.	"The Game of Life (Score)" (Dead Prez)	C. Gavin; L. Alford; A. Mair; V. Williams	Da Heads	5:08
2.	"Diesel" (Wu-Tang Clan featuring RZA, Method Man, U-God, Raekwon and Ol' Dirty Bastard)	Wu-Tang Clan	RZA	5:29
3.	"Against the Grain" (Sauce Money)	T. Gaither; C. Martin	DJ Premier	3:48
4.	"Ride" (M.O.P.)	J. Grinnage; E. Murry	M.O.P.	3:33
5.	"You Ain't a Killer" (Big Pun)	C. Rios; R. Frierson	Younglord	4:15
6.	"Los Angeles Times" (Xzibit)	A. Joiner; M. Bradford	Mel-Man	4:41
7.	"Main Aim" (Cella Dwellas)	A. Outlaw; C. Gerald; N. Loizedes; R. Noble; J. Williams; K. Khallel; K. Madison	Nick Wiz	3:30
8.	"Rare Species (Modus Operandi)" (Mobb Deep)	A. Johnson; K. Muchita	Mobb Deep	4:10
9.	"High Expectations" (Common)	L. Lynn; E. Wilson	No I.D.	4:15
10.	"A Child Is Born" (Brand Nubian)	D. Murphy; L. DeChalus; M. Dixon; V. Wright; E. Fletcher; M. Glover; S. Robinson; C. Chase	Vance Wright	4:21
11.	"Won on Won" (Smif-N-Wessun)	D. Matthews; T. Williams; D. Yates; C. Ridenhour; H. Schocklee	Sean C	3:54
12.	"Soul in the Hole" (Wu All-Stars featuring Timbo King, Dreddy Kruger, Shyheim and Killa Sin)	A. Wilson; S. Franklin; T. Drayton; J. Grant; T. Washington; J. Dockaery	Black Moes-Art	4:41
13.	"Visions of Blur" (Darc Mind)	K. Holland; R. Davis	X-Ray	4:55
14.	"Late Night Action" (Organized Konfusion featuring Boku Rule and Cairo of Tha Ill Rahlos)	L. Baskerville; T. Jamerson	Organized Konfusion	3:42
15.	"Your Life" (O.C. featuring U Nast)	O. Credle; S. Scott	DJ Ogee	5:24
Total length:				65:28

== Charts ==
Chart	Peak position
US Billboard 200	73
US Top R&B/Hip-Hop Albums (Billboard)	13
