= The Infamous Mobb Deep =

Studio album by Mobb Deep
- Released: April 1, 2014
- Recorded: March 30, 1998 – September 9, 2001 and late 2013 or 2014
- Genres: Hip-hop; East Coast hip-hop
- Length: 127:11
- Labels: HClass; Infamous
- Producers: Mobb Deep; Havoc; The Alchemist; Beat Butcha; Boi-1da; Gabriel Lambirth; Karon Graham; Kaytranada; Illmind; Michael Uzowuru; The Maven Boys; Om'Mas Keith; Salaam Remi; Sevn Thomas; The Abstract

Mobb Deep chronology
Black Cocaine (2011)	The Infamous Mobb Deep (2014)	Infinite (2025)

Singles from The Infamous Mobb Deep
- 1. "Taking You off Here" Released: January 31, 2014; 2. "Say Something" Released: March 12, 2014

The Infamous Mobb Deep is the eighth studio album by American hip-hop duo Mobb Deep. The album was released on April 1, 2014, by Havoc's HClass Entertainment and Prodigy's Infamous Records. The Infamous Mobb Deep is a double album that consists of one disc of new original music and another of unreleased tracks from the recording sessions of their second studio album The Infamous (1995). The album had been in development since 2011, but was delayed by a feud that occurred between Havoc and Prodigy in 2012. However, they shortly reconciled.

The duo toured to celebrate the 20th anniversary of their debut studio album in 2013. This led to the two reconvening to get back into the album's recording process. The album's production was handled by Havoc, Boi-1da, Illmind and The Alchemist, among others. The album contains guest appearances from French Montana, Juicy J, The LOX, Bun B, Busta Rhymes, Nas, and Snoop Dogg among others. The 1994 Infamous Sessions contains guest appearances from Big Noyd, Ghostface Killah, Raekwon, and Nas. The album was supported by the singles "Taking You off Here" and "Say Something".

== Background and development ==
In 2006, Mobb Deep released its seventh studio album Blood Money under 50 Cent's G-Unit Records and Interscope Records. For over the following years, the duo released various solo projects, songs and EPs, while revealing plans for their eighth studio album. However, on July 27, 2012, Havoc informed AllHipHop; the duo was on an indefinite hiatus. Members Havoc and Prodigy had dis-united, after Havoc attacked Prodigy on Twitter, and eventually a sound clip leaked on the internet of him insulting Prodigy during their concert at SXSW. Initially, Havoc claimed his accounts were hacked. However, he later admitted it was him, as he saw Twitter as an inadequate place to solve a conflict. He also stated he had a Prodigy diss track recorded.

In January 2013, Prodigy revealed he was sure he would record with Havoc in the future. The 2013's Paid Dues lineup then revealed Mobb Deep would be rejoining to perform at the March 30, 2013 event. They were later confirmed to be reuniting for Paid Dues and an international 20th anniversary tour starting in May 2013. On March 22, 2013, Havoc and Prodigy officially reunited for an interview, and touched base on the turmoil between them. Prodigy stated "At the end of the day, the music is the most important thing and our love for each other it's only right we're gonna get right back to work."

The album was then revealed to be a double album on December 17, 2013, with the second disc containing unreleased tracks and recording sessions from the duo's second studio album, The Infamous. Prodigy stated that the album would be released during March 2014 and it would now be titled The Infamous Mobb Deep. He later said the whole project would be getting back to their original gritty New York sound. Prodigy explained to XXL;

"I would just say, our signature sound is a dark, sinister-type of sound. There's certain things we're going through in our lives right now, and the lyrics are just up to date. Everything that we're saying is going on right now. Each album is like that, it's a time capsule of that time period. So now in 2014, you're gonna hear what we're going through in our lyrics, what's going through our head as grown men."

== Recording and production ==
In May 2011, Havoc announced that they were recording their self-titled eighth studio album. He revealed that the album would contain production from himself, The Alchemist, Sid Roams, DJ Premier, MTK, Cardiak and the J.U.S.T.I.C.E. League, as well as other guest appearances from rappers such as, Lil' Kim, Rick Ross, Wiz Khalifa, Odd Future and Nas on the album.

Around the May 2013 release of Havoc's third studio album, 13, Havoc announced that he and Prodigy had been in the studio for over a month working on their eighth studio album, which he stated was already "halfway done." He also mentioned that he would be doing the entire production on the album. On August 6, 2013, Prodigy announced that they had finished nine songs for the album, and confirmed the album would be titled Mobb Deep. On November 4, 2013, Prodigy revealed that The Alchemist, and possibly Action Bronson and Earl Sweatshirt would be among the few guest appearances on the album.

In a January 2014 interview with Vibe, record producer Boi-1da confirmed working significantly on the album saying, "It's new-age with that old Mobb twist to it. I was a big fan of Mobb Deep and Havoc's production, so I just reached out and me and him have been producing records together, sending stuff back and forth. I can say that I have some records on the new Mobb Deep album that me and Havoc did together. It's something I knocked off my bucket list." During an interview with XXL and Prodigy later that month, he stated that Havoc, The Alchemist, Illmind and Boi-1da would provide production on the album. He also elaborated on the unreleased material saying that it would contain never before heard skits and verses by Ghostface Killah, Raekwon, Nas, N.O.R.E. and Mobb Deep. Prodigy then confirmed in March 2014, that the album would feature rappers Bun B and Juicy J on a song called "Legendary". The track listing revealed guest appearances on the album from French Montana, The LOX, Bun B, Juicy J, Mack Wilds, Big Noyd, Busta Rhymes, and Snoop Dogg.

== Release and promotion ==
On November 21, 2011, the duo released an EP titled Black Cocaine. On January 10, 2014, Mobb Deep began touring on The Infamous Mobb Deep concert tour in promotion of the album. The 31-date North American leg of the tour will run until May 2, 2014. They will follow those dates with a European leg of the tour in the months following. On February 18, 2014, the duo released the cover artwork for the album.

On February 18, 2014, Mobb Deep revealed the album's cover artwork and a release date of April 1, 2014 for the album. Additionally, PledgeMusic took deluxe edition pre-orders for the album that gave customers the chance to receive signed T-shirts and vinyl, as well as unique experiences such as VIP drinks with Prodigy, a PledgeMusic-only show, a limited edition Infamous bike, and access to unreleased tracks. Following this, the duo will release a super deluxe version which will include a re-mastered copy of the original Infamous album and a 2012 documentary produced by Red Bull. The super deluxe version will only be available as a physical copy.

=== Singles ===
The album's first single "Taking You Off Here" was premiered on January 29, 2014 on New York's Hot 97 radio station. It was the first official song release from the album. Then two days later the song was released for digital download. On March 5, 2014, the music video was released for "Taking You Off Here". The album's second single "Say Something", produced by Illmind, was released on March 12, 2014.

== Critical reception ==
Professional ratings
Review scores
Source	Rating
AllMusic	3/5 stars
Exclaim!	9/10
HipHopDX	4/5 stars
The National	3/4 stars
Pitchfork Media	4.9/10
Rolling Stone	3/5 stars
USA Today	2.5/4 stars
XXL	4/5 (XL)

The Infamous Mobb Deep was met with generally positive from music critics. At Metacritic, which assigns a normalized rating out of 100 to reviews from critics, the album received an average score of 70, which indicates "generally favorable reviews," based on 7 reviews. Del F. Cowie of Exclaim! stated, "It's a welcome return to form that sees the group addressing the weaknesses that had hastened whispers of their decline. Havoc shares the beat-making duties with carefully curated and Mobb-tailored contributions from Illmind and Alchemist, as well as Canadians Boi-1da and Kaytranada, and reins in any commercial overtures." Writing for Rolling Stone, Christopher R. Weingarten commented "The duo's mean, scrappy eighth album is the first to truly embrace their underdog status, wrapping itself in the low-fi, Walkman-ready vibe that has dominated the best of founding members Prodigy's and Havoc's solo work on indie labels." Chisom Uzosike of XXL gave the album an XL rating, saying "The Infamous Mobb Deep is a must-have in a true Mobb Deep fan's collection. Crafting such a quality hip-hop album, two decades after your magnum opus, is a remarkable feat. Such longevity in hip-hop is rare, and Prodigy and Havoc deserve their due respect. If this is Mobb Deep's last album, this legendary duo couldn't have chosen a much better way to go out."

Martin Caballero of USA Today said, "Mobb Deep return to the spirit of its breakthrough album The Infamous on its eighth LP. That record established the Queens duo's signature brand of nihilistic raps over intoxicatingly dark instrumentals, and now The Infamous Mobb Deep doesn't stray far from that successful formula." Homer Johnsen of HipHopDX said, "There are no fun and games here. Just business. Havoc and Prodigy are as dialed in as ever. The Infamous Mobb Deep is a return to the roots of their artistic consciousness, substantiated almost 20 years ago, and with fine precision. With an all-star cast of guest lyricists and a gang of producers, The Infamous Mobb Deep is a loud wake-up call for Hip Hop. The Rap game is survival of the fittest, and Mobb Deep still roams among the strong." Adam Wordkman of The National stated, "While pairing classic with contemporary is risky, it's an interesting demonstration of the development of Mobb Deep's thuggish methodology. At two hours, though, the entire experience might test the patience of the uninitiated."

== Commercial performance ==
The album debuted at number 49 on the Billboard 200 chart, with first-week sales of 7,100 copies in the United States.

== Track listing ==
Mobb Deep
No.	Title	Producer(s)	Length
1.	"Taking You Off Here"	Havoc	3:23
2.	"Say Something"	Illmind	4:00
3.	"Get Down" (featuring Snoop Dogg)	Havoc	4:24
4.	"Dirt"	Illmind; Gabriel Lambirth; Karon Graham	2:52
5.	"Timeless"	Beat Butcha	4:25
6.	"All a Dream" (featuring The Lox)	Michael Uzowuru; Om'Mas Keith	5:06
7.	"Low" (featuring Mack Wilds)	Sevn Thomas; Havoc; Boi-1da	3:27
8.	"Murdera"	Illmind	3:25
9.	"Check the Credits"	Illmind	3:06
10.	"Gimme All That"	Havoc	3:31
11.	"Legendary" (featuring Bun B and Juicy J)	Havoc; Boi-1da; The Maven Boys	4:01
12.	"Lifetime"	The Alchemist	3:06
13.	"My Block"	Kaytranada	2:07

Deluxe edition (bonus tracks)
No.	Title	Producer(s)	Length
14.	"Henny" (featuring French Montana, Mack Wilds and Busta Rhymes)	Havoc; Salaam Remi	3:41
15.	"Conquer"	Havoc	3:22
16.	"Waterboarding"	The Alchemist	3:34
17.	"Get It Forever" (featuring Nas)	The Alchemist	3:58

The 1994 Infamous Sessions
No.	Title	Producer(s)	Length
1.	"Eye for an Eye" (featuring Nas, Raekwon and Ghostface Killah)	Mobb Deep	6:48
2.	"Skit" (featuring Raekwon and Nas)	Mobb Deep	2:31
3.	"Take It In Blood" (featuring Infamous Mobb)	Mobb Deep	5:33
4.	"Gimme the Goods" (featuring Big Noyd)	Mobb Deep	5:19
5.	"If It's Alright" (featuring Big Noyd)	Mobb Deep	5:12
6.	"Skit Mobb Deep 1995"	Mobb Deep	1:25
7.	"Survival of the Fittest (Extended Remix)" (featuring Crystal Johnson)	Mobb Deep	5:15
8.	"Temperature's Rising (Remix)" (featuring Crystal Johnson)	The Abstract^{[a]}	5:19
9.	"The Bridge" (featuring Big Noyd)	Mobb Deep	5:35
10.	"Skit" (featuring Big Noyd)	Mobb Deep	1:52
11.	"The Money" (featuring Killer Black and Karate Joe)	Mobb Deep	7:16
12.	"The Money" (Version 2)	Mobb Deep	4:33
13.	"We About to Get Hectic" (featuring Twin Gambino)	Mobb Deep	4:47
14.	"The Infamous"	Mobb Deep	4:03

- ^{^a} Mobb Deep is mistakenly credited on the album as the producer of "Temperature's Rising (Remix)"

== Charts ==
Chart (2014)	Peak position
US Billboard 200	49
US Independent Albums (Billboard)	11
US Top R&B/Hip-Hop Albums (Billboard)	10
