= Black Cocaine =

EP by Mobb Deep
- Released: November 21, 2011
- Recorded: 2011
- Genre: Hip-hop
- Length: 19:27
- Label: Infamous; RED
- Producer: Havoc; The Alchemist; Young Free; Beat Butcha

Mobb Deep chronology
The Safe Is Cracked (2009)	Black Cocaine (2011)	The Infamous Mobb Deep (2014)

Professional ratings
Aggregate scores
Source	Rating
Metacritic	61/100
Review scores
Source	Rating
The A.V. Club	C−
AllHipHop	7/10
AllMusic	3.5/5 stars
HipHopDX	3/5 stars
Pitchfork	5.4/10
Spin	7/10

Black Cocaine is an EP by hip-hop duo Mobb Deep, and the duo's first release following Prodigy's release from prison. The project was announced by producer The Alchemist through his Twitter account. The songs "Conquer", "Get It Forever" and "Waterboarding" were later featured as bonus tracks on their 2014 album The Infamous Mobb Deep.

== Sales ==
The EP sold 5,000 copies in its first week. As of March 1, 2012 the EP has sold 15,100 copies in the US.

== Track listing ==
Track listing confirmed by HipHopDX

No.	Title	Producer(s)	Length
1.	"Dead Man Shoes" (featuring Bounty Killer)	Beat Butcha	4:42
2.	"Black Cocaine"	The Alchemist	4:09
3.	"Conquer"	Havoc	3:23
4.	"Get It Forever" (featuring Nas)	The Alchemist	4:02
5.	"Last Days"	Young Free	3:13
6.	"Waterboarding" (Limited Edition Bonus)	The Alchemist	3:32
7.	"Street Lights" (Limited Edition Bonus) (featuring Dion)	J.U.S.T.I.C.E. League	4:23

== Charts ==
Chart (2011)	Peak position
US Independent Albums (Billboard)	22
US Top R&B/Hip-Hop Albums (Billboard)	33
