= Survival of the Fittest (song) =

Single by Mobb Deep

from the album The Infamous
- Released: May 29, 1995
- Recorded: 1994
- Studio: Battery Studios (New York City)
- Genre: East Coast hip hop
- Length: 3:43
- Label: Loud, RCA
- Songwriters: Kejuan Muchita, Albert Johnson
- Producer: Havoc

Mobb Deep singles chronology
| "Shook Ones, Part II" (1995) | "Survival of the Fittest" (1995) | "Temperature's Rising" (1995) |

Music video
- "Survival of the Fittest" on YouTube

"Survival of the Fittest" is a song by the American hip hop duo Mobb Deep from their second studio album, The Infamous (1995). It was released as the second single from the aforementioned album on May 29, 1995, by Loud Records. The song was produced by Havoc, using a sample of the 1976 song "Skylark" by The Barry Harris Trio and Al Cohn.

The single had mainstream success; it peaked at No. 59 and 69 on the US Cash Box Top 100 and Billboard Hot 100 charts, and became a top-10 hit on the Billboard Hot Rap Singles chart. The song received acclaim from music critics and is widely considered a classic of 1990s New York hip hop, along with the lead single from the album, "Shook Ones, Part II".

== Recording ==
"Survival of the Fittest"
A sample of the first verse, performed by Prodigy. Stereogum highlighted the song's "elongated, dying piano tones". The main sample used in the song, slowed down piano riff from "Skylark" by The Barry Harris Trio and Al Cohn, remained unknown for nearly two decades.

"Survival of the Fittest" was produced by Havoc at his apartment in Queensbridge, where the duo worked on the album, recorded at Battery Studios, and mixed at Unique Recording Studios. The instrumental for the song is based on a sample from the 1976 song "Skylark" by The Barry Harris Trio and Al Cohn. According to Prodigy, Havoc didn't like the beat at first and wanted to delete it. Prodigy asked him to play the beat to their friends and they convinced him to keep it. The lyrics for the song were written in one day. According to Schott Free, Loud's executive producer and A&R, Q-Tip helped program the drums for the song. In the interview with Complex magazine Schott Free said the drums "[intensify] the entire record" and "[add] so much" on top of the original beat, which he described as "ill", "gloomy", and "street". The original instrumental also featured a sample of a James Brown song, but it was removed after the label couldn't come to an agreement with publishers.

Speaking about his verse on "Survival of the Fittest", Havoc explained, "We were just straight hood. It wasn't no pretty boy shit. It was like, 'Yo, let's throw on our Timbs.' It didn't get more harder than that."

== Release and promotion ==
"Survival of the Fittest" was released as the second single from The Infamous on May 29, 1995. On July 8 Loud Records arranged a paintball competition to promote the single. Loud Records' artists Cella Dwellas and Raekwon, Ghostface Killah, and Loud Records' staff joined Mobb Deep in the competition.

A music video for "Survival of the Fittest" was also released. It was directed by Musa "Choice" Moore and shot in Queensbridge. The video features cameos from Ty Nitty, Nas and Puff Daddy.

In 2015, Mobb Deep released a remix of "Survival of the Fittest" in collaboration with ESPN. It was used in the network's NBA Countdown show.

== Critical reception ==
"Survival of the Fittest" received acclaim by contemporary music critics. Vibe magazine's Elliott Wilson noted that the song "[features] Mobb Deep's usual combination of deep lyrics, sinister keyboard chords, earth-shattering bass, and crisp drum tracks". Writing for Los Angeles Times, Heidi Siegmund praised the song, calling it "a mosaic of slow, stealthy beats that rarely lets in any melodic light" and commending the duo's "dark poetic talents".

== Legacy ==
"Survival of the Fittest" is widely considered a classic of 1990s New York hip hop. Consequence of Sound stated that it's "as gritty as New York hip-hop could get". HipHopDX called it "one of the most melancholy, rigid Hip Hop songs of all-time".

According to Pitchfork, the line "There's a war going on outside no man is safe from" became the album's most famous and often quoted lyrics. Complex named it one of the 100 best opening lines in hip hop history and wrote, "Prodigy's opening bars on "Survival of the Fittest" convey the high-wire balancing act that is life in America's most dangerous neighborhoods with a single phrase".

"Survival of the Fittest" was featured in the soundtrack for the 2002 film 8 Mile and the 2006 video game Marc Ecko's Getting Up: Contents Under Pressure.

== Track listing ==
Side A

1. "Survival of the Fittest" [LP Version] – 3:43
2. "Survival of the Fittest" [Remix] – 4:20

Side B

1. "Survival of the Fittest" [Extended Version] – 5:19
2. "Survival of the Fittest" [Remix Instrumental] – 5:20
3. "Survival of the Fittest" [Acappella] – 4:17

== Personnel ==
Credits are adapted from the single's liner notes.

- Mobb Deep – producer, executive producer, mixing
- Crystal Johnson – vocals (remix)
- Tim Latham – recording
- Tony Smalios – mixing
- Leon Zervos – mastering
- Chi Modu – photography
- Merge One – art direction
- Sandra "Peachie" Bynum – management
- Tami Cobbs – management
- Matt Life – A&R direction, executive producer
- Schott Free – A&R direction, executive producer
- Stretch Armstrong – A&R direction

== Charts ==
| Chart (1995) | Peak position |
|---|---|
| US Billboard Hot 100 | 69 |
| US Hot Rap Singles (Billboard) | 10 |
| US Hot R&B Singles (Billboard) | 60 |
| US Cash Box Top 100 | 59 |

== Certifications ==
| Region | Certification | Certified units/sales |
|---|---|---|
| New Zealand (RMNZ) | Platinum | 30,000^{‡} |
| United Kingdom (BPI) | Silver | 200,000^{‡} |
^{‡} Sales+streaming figures based on certification alone.
