= Give Up the Goods (Just Step) =

Single by Mobb Deep featuring Big Noyd

from the album The Infamous
- Released: January 22, 1996
- Recorded: 1994
- Genre: Hip hop
- Length: 4:02
- Label: Loud Records
- Songwriters: Kejuan Muchita, Albert Johnson, Kamaal Fareed, TaJuan Perry, Mayfield Small Jr.
- Producer: Q-Tip

Mobb Deep singles chronology
| "Temperature's Rising" (1995) | "Give Up the Goods (Just Step)" (1996) | "L.A., L.A." (1996) |

Music video
- "Give Up the Goods (Just Step)" on YouTube

"Give Up the Goods (Just Step)" is the fourth and final single from Mobb Deep's second album The Infamous, featuring Big Noyd. Produced by Q-Tip, the song contains a sample of "That's All Right With Me" by Esther Phillips.

== Background ==
Speaking with Complex, Prodigy detailed the process that went into making the song:

When we did that shit in Q-Tip's crib we first came up with the concept for that song. He lived on Linden Boulevard in Jamaica. We were in his crib and he had made the beat right there and we were like, "Oh, this is fire right here." We took it to the studio later that night. ... For that song, Q-Tip threw a record on, played it, and it was [the sample used for] LL Cool J's "Pink Cookies in a Plastic Bag Getting Crushed by Buildings." ... Because L made the song talking about pink cookies in a plastic bag, it was kind of weird. We was like, "Fuck that. We're going to make it some hardcore shit." So that's how we flipped that shit.

The song paints a grim picture of the Queensbridge Housing Project, with topics of street robbery, shootouts, drug and alcohol use and drug dealing.

== Music video ==
Much like their later hit "Burn", parts of the music video are in black and white. Most of the video takes place in a nightclub.

== Track listing ==
Side A

1. "Give Up the Goods (Just Step)" (Radio Edit)

Side B

1. "Give Up the Goods (Just Step)" (Album Version)
2. "Give Up the Goods (Just Step)" (Album Version Instrumental)
