= Shook Ones, Part II =

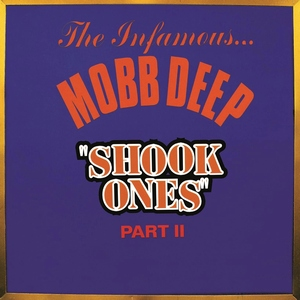

Single by Mobb Deep

from the album The Infamous
- Released: February 7, 1995
- Recorded: 1994
- Studio: Battery Studios, New York City
- Genre: East Coast hip hop; hardcore hip hop; gangsta rap
- Length: 5:26
- Label: Loud; RCA
- Songwriters: Albert Johnson; Kejuan Muchita
- Producer: Havoc

Mobb Deep singles chronology
"Hit It from the Back" (1993)	"Shook Ones, Part II" (1995)	"Survival of the Fittest" (1995)

Music video
- "Shook Ones, Part II (Official HD Video)" on YouTube

"Shook Ones, Part II" is a song by American hip-hop duo Mobb Deep, released in February 1995 by Loud and RCA Records, as the first single from their second album, The Infamous (1995). The song is a sequel to the group's 1994 promotional single "Shook Ones", with similar lyrics, but less profanity. The original song is featured on the B-side of some releases of "Shook Ones, Part II" and was also included on the international version of the group's album Hell on Earth. "Shook Ones, Part II" peaked at numbers 59 and 73 on the US Billboard Hot 100 and Cash Box Top 100 charts.

== Background and composition ==
The original "Shook Ones" was released as a promotional single in 1994 as the debut single on Mobb Deep's new label, Loud Records. Producer Havoc stated,

What made us do a remix or a part two to the first "Shook Ones" was just our nervousness about failing because we had come off of the Juvenile Hell album, which wasn't too successful. So, we were kind of paranoid. So, we made the first 'Shook Ones" and was like, "Okay, that's all right. But, let's try to fuck with this shit again" just to be sure, and we ended up making "Shook Ones Pt. II".

Havoc produced the beat for "Shook Ones, Part II" in his bedroom in the Queensbridge Houses in Queens, New York. The drums were sequenced on an Akai MPC60 and the other samples were sequenced on an Ensoniq EPS-16 Plus. The song samples a piano melody from "Jessica" by Herbie Hancock, strings from "Kitty with the Bent Frame" by Quincy Jones, and drums from "Dirty Feet" by the Daly-Wilson Big Band. The Herbie Hancock sample was slowed down and the pitch was altered to create the beat in the song. Havoc recalled that the beat was about to be deleted until Prodigy walked in and convinced him to keep it.

The narrative is told from the perspective of inner-city youths engaged in territorial warfare and struggling for financial gains. The phrase "shook one" refers to someone who may portray themselves as tough, but cowers or loses their nerve (i.e. becomes "shaken up") when faced with conflict or intimidation.

== Music video ==
The music video shows Prodigy and Havoc rapping in different parts of Queensbridge at different times of the day. It also shows Prodigy rapping while driving a car, and Havoc rapping in the backseat of a car.

Havoc recalled: "Everyone on set was hype because the record had gained so much traction. The label, the around the way crew, Prodigy and I - we were all excited to shoot a visual for the record." He also stated: "The whole video was shot in QueensBridge, which gave it a more grimey edge and authentic feel. My favorite scene is when we have the whole crew behind us, and Prodigy and I have on the Hennessy jerseys. I loved those shirts. Prodigy got them made." Havoc also commented: "The most challenging part of making the video was staying awake, because we shot non-stop from early that morning to 7am the next day."

While shooting the music video, Mobb Deep got into a fight with a man who was complaining about not getting enough screen time in the music video.

== Reception ==
In 2010 Pitchfork Media included the song at number 25 on their Top 200 Tracks of the 90s. Rolling Stone magazine placed the song on its list of The 50 Greatest Hip-Hop Songs of All Time and their list of the "Top 500 Best Songs of All Time" at No. 215. while Complex ranked "Shook Ones, Part II" at No. 23 on their list of the 25 most violent rap songs of all time. The BBC placed the song at third in their list of the greatest hip-hop songs of all time. In 2024, it was voted by Rock the Bells as the greatest Hip-Hop beat of all time.

== Legacy ==
In 1997, the song was sampled by Mariah Carey in her single "The Roof (Back in Time)". For its single remix, Mobb Deep recorded additional raps and also appeared in the music video. The song appears in the 2002 movie 8 Mile and in the 2005 video game Grand Theft Auto: Liberty City Stories. It also appears in NBA 2K13, NBA 2K18, and NBA 2K26. The line "I'm only nineteen but my mind is older" is quoted in the Hamilton song "My Shot". The title of the song is referenced in the fourth episode of the first season of the American teen drama television series Euphoria.

== Track listing ==
Side A
No.	Title	Length
1.	"Shook Ones, Part II" (LP Version)	4:27
2.	"Shook Ones, Part II" (Instrumental)	4:41
3.	"Shook Ones, Part II" (A Cappella)	3:49

Side B
No.	Title	Length
1.	"Shook Ones, Part I" (Original Version)	4:13
2.	"Shook Ones, Part I" (Instrumental)	4:13

== Charts ==
Chart (1995)	Peak position
US Billboard Hot 100	59
US Hot R&B/Hip-Hop Songs (Billboard)	52
US Hot Rap Singles (Billboard)	7
US Cash Box Top 100	73

== Certifications ==
Region	Certification	Certified units/sales
Denmark (IFPI Danmark)	Platinum	90,000^{‡}
Germany (BVMI)	Gold	300,000^{‡}
Italy (FIMI)	Gold	50,000^{‡}
New Zealand (RMNZ)	3× Platinum	90,000^{‡}
United Kingdom (BPI)	Platinum	600,000^{‡}
^{‡} Sales+streaming figures based on certification alone.
