= Free Agents: The Murda Mixtape =

Mixtape by Mobb Deep
- Released: April 22, 2003
- Genres: East Coast hip hop; hardcore hip hop
- Length: 2:04:49
- Label: Landspeed Records
- Producers: Havoc; SC; Alchemist

Professional ratings
Review scores
Source	Rating
RapReviews	8.5/10

Free Agents: The Murda Mixtape is a double mixtape album by American hardcore/East Coast hip hop duo Mobb Deep. It was released on April 22, 2003, through Landspeed Records with distribution via Koch Entertainment.

The first disc is composed of 22 tracks, and featured production from Havoc, S.C. and Alchemist with Robert Perry and Mobb Deep serving as executive producers. Recording sessions took place at Fly Studios. Tracks from 17 to 22 are classic freestyles mixed by DJ Whoo Kid. A. Dog from ACD and Big Noyd were the only guests on the disc one.

The bonus disc is composed of 19 tracks, and featured production from Havoc, Alchemist, Godfather Don, V.I.C., Bink!, Ghetto Pros. and DJ Whoo Kid. Recording sessions took place at Soundtrack Studio, at the Lab, at D&D Studios and at Chung King Studios in New York, at Soundproof in California, and at C Mo' Greens Studio. 1st Infantry, 50 Cent, Blaq Poet, Cormega, Evidence, Infamous Mobb, Kool G Rap, Littles, Tragedy Khadafi, Noyd and Godfather Don were featured on the bonus disc.

The album peaked at number 21 on the Billboard 200.

== Track listing ==
No.	Title	Length
1.	"This Is Not Supposed to Be Positive..." (Intro)	0:34
2.	"Solidified"	3:58
3.	"Survival of the Fittest 2003"	2:32
4.	"Paid in Full"	3:18
5.	"Double Shots" (featuring Big Noyd)	3:21
6.	"What Can I Do?"	2:35
7.	"Favorite Rapper"	3:09
8.	"Let's Pop" (featuring Dog)	3:49
9.	"It's Over"	2:58
10.	"The Illest"	3:42
11.	"Just Got Out the Box..." (Skit)	0:27
12.	"Narcotic"	3:45
13.	"Clap First"	3:00
14.	"Watch That Nigga"	2:05
15.	"Came Up"	2:19
16.	"Don't Call Tasha"	1:44
17.	"One Tribe..." (Skit)	0:42
18.	"Cradle to the Grave"	1:54
19.	"Tough Love"	3:07
20.	"Can't Fuck Wit"	2:06
21.	"Right Back at You"	2:19
22.	"Shook Ones"	2:10

The Bonus Disc
No.	Title	Writer(s)	Producer(s)	Length
23.	"Burn Something" (performed by Mobb Deep featuring Littles)	Kejuan Muchita; Albert Johnson	DJ Whoo Kid	3:57
24.	"Get Back" (performed by Mobb Deep featuring Big Noyd)	Muchita; Johnson; TaJuan Perry; Rodney Chapman	Godfather Don	3:35
25.	"Serious (The New Message)" (performed by 1st Infantry featuring Prodigy)	Johnson; Alan Maman	Alchemist	3:17
26.	"The Midnight Creep" (performed by 1st Infantry featuring Havoc & Twin Gambino)	Muchita; Jamal Abdul Raheem	Havoc	3:37
27.	"Fourth of July" (performed by 1st Infantry featuring Alchemist, Evidence, Prodigy & Twin Gambino)	Johnson; Michael Perretta; Abdul Raheem; Maman	Alchemist	4:54
28.	"Backwards" (performed by 1st Infantry featuring Mobb Deep)	Muchita; Johnson; Maman	Alchemist	3:40
29.	"Bang Bang" (performed by Big Noyd)	Perry; Maman	Alchemist	3:15
30.	"Air It Out" (performed by Big Noyd featuring Havoc)	Muchita; Perry; Maman	Alchemist	3:27
31.	"Bump That" (performed by Havoc featuring 50 Cent & Big Noyd)	Muchita; Perry; Curtis Jackson	Havoc	4:04
32.	"The Family (Skit)" (performed by Prodigy)			0:38
33.	"Mobb Niggaz" (performed by Infamous Mobb featuring Prodigy)	Johnson; James Chandler; Lionel Cooper; Abdul Raheem; Maman	Alchemist	4:24
34.	"Killa Queens" (performed by Infamous Mobb featuring Prodigy & Big Noyd)	Johnson; Perry; Abdul Raheem; Chandler; Cooper; Victor Padilla	V.I.C.	3:59
35.	"We Don't Give A..." (performed by Infamous Mobb featuring Havoc)	Muchita; Abdul Raheem; Chandler; Cooper	Havoc	4:23
36.	"B.I.G. T.W.I.N.S." (performed by Twin Gambino)	Abdul Raheem; Maman	Alchemist	3:03
37.	"Thun & Kicko" (performed by Cormega featuring Prodigy)	Muchita; Johnson; Cory McKay	Havoc	3:55
38.	"What's Poppin'" (performed by Tragedy Khadafi featuring Havoc)	Muchita; Percy Chapman	Havoc	4:15
39.	"The Heat Is On" (performed by Poet featuring Prodigy & Godfather Don)	Muchita; Johnson; R. Chapman; Wilbur Bass	Godfather Don	3:10
40.	"Where Ya At?" (performed by Kool G Rap featuring Prodigy)	Johnson; Nathaniel Wilson; Roosevelt Harrell; D. Hall	Bink!	3:50
41.	"Thug Chronicles" (performed by Kool G Rap featuring Havoc)	Muchita; Wilson; Padilla; Mike Herard	Ghetto Professionals	3:52
Total length:				2:04:49

== Charts ==
Chart (2003)	Peak position
French Albums (SNEP)	84
German Albums (Offizielle Top 100)	84
UK Albums (OCC)	152
UK R&B Albums (Official Charts)	30
UK Independent Albums (Official Charts)	14
US Billboard 200	21
US Top R&B/Hip-Hop Albums (Billboard)	4
US Independent Albums (Billboard)	1
