= Shook Ones (song) =

Promotional single by Mobb Deep

from the album Hell on Earth (International Version)
- Released: 1994
- Recorded: 1994
- Genre: East Coast hip-hop; hardcore hip-hop
- Length: 4:13
- Label: Loud; RCA; BMG
- Songwriter(s): Kejuan Muchita; Albert Johnson
- Producer(s): Mobb Deep

"Shook Ones" (later also known as "Shook Ones, Part I") is a 1994 promotional single by hip-hop group Mobb Deep. The song was the group's debut on Loud Records after being dropped from their previous label, 4th & B'way Records.

A sequel titled "Shook Ones, Pt. II" was the first official single of the group's second album, The Infamous. "Shook Ones" was featured on the b-side, retitled "Shook Ones Pt. I." The cut eventually made its way on the International version of the group's album Hell on Earth.

The song was also released by Think Differently Records on its compilation Originals, which featured 24 tracks including original versions, uncleared-sample versions, and unreleased-verse versions.

Lyrics from this song were sampled in the song "O-Zone" by O.C. in 1994, the same year this song was released. A sample was also used in the song "Beware" from Big Pun's album Capital Punishment in 1998 and a sample was used as the hook in Ice-T's song "Forced to Do Dirt" from his 1996 album VI - Return of the Real.
