= Realms 'n Reality =

Studio album by Cella Dwellas
- Released: March 26, 1996
- Recorded: 1994–1996
- Genre: Hip hop
- Length: 1:04:19
- Label: Loud; RCA; BMG
- Producer: Cella Dwellas; Gatman; Megahurtz; Nick Wiz; The Bluez Brothers

Cella Dwellas chronology
Realms 'n Reality (1996)	The Last Shall Be First (2000)

Singles from Realms 'n Reality
- 1. "Land of the Lost" Released: November 14, 1994; 2. "Good Dwellas" Released: July 3, 1995; 3. "Perfect Match" Released: April 7, 1996

Professional ratings
Review scores
Source	Rating
AllMusic	4/5 stars
Muzik	4/5 stars
The Source	3.5/5 stars

Realms 'n Reality is the debut studio album of American hip hop duo Cella Dwellas. It was released on March 26, 1996, through Loud Records. Production was handled by Nick Wiz, DJ Megahurtz, Gatman, The Bluez Brothers, and Cella Dwellas themselves. It features a lone guest appearance from Baybe. The album peaked at number 160 on the Billboard 200 and number 21 on the Top R&B/Hip-Hop Albums in the United States. Three singles were produced from the album: "Land of the Lost", "Good Dwellas", and "Perfect Match".

== Track listing ==
No.	Title	Writer(s)	Producer(s)	Length
1.	"Advance to Boardwalk"	Alando John Outlaw; Christopher Alexander Gerald; Nick Loizides; Andrew Smith	Nick Wiz	3:37
2.	"Mystic Freestyle"	Outlaw; Gerald; Marlon Earle; S. McKenzie	DJ Megahurtz	3:46
3.	"Perfect Match" (featuring Baybe)	Outlaw; Gerald; A. Evans; Loizides; Smith; Claydes Charles Smith; Ronald Bell	Nick Wiz	4:21
4.	"Medina Style"	Outlaw; Gerald; Earle; L. Lubin	DJ Megahurtz	3:33
5.	"Recognize 'N Realize"	Outlaw; Gerald; Loizides; Smith; Tony Hester	Nick Wiz	4:09
6.	"Cella Dwellas"	Outlaw; Gerald; Loizides; Smith	Nick Wiz	4:27
7.	"Wussdaplan"	Outlaw; Gerald	Cella Dwellas	4:21
8.	"Good Dwellas"	Outlaw; Gerald; Loizides; Smith; Les McCann	Nick Wiz	4:22
9.	"Hold U Down"	Outlaw; Gerald; Loizides; Smith	Nick Wiz	3:24
10.	"Realm 3"	Outlaw; Gerald; Reginald Ellis	The Bluez Brothers	4:12
11.	"Line 4 Line"	Outlaw; Gerald; Loizides	Nick Wiz	3:26
12.	"Worries"	Outlaw; Gerald; S. Pile	Gatman	4:01
13.	"We Got It Hemmed"	Outlaw; Gerald; Loizides; Smith	Nick Wiz	4:40
14.	"Good Dwellas (Part 2)"	Outlaw; Gerald; Loizides; Smith	Nick Wiz	3:33
15.	"Outro"	Outlaw; Gerald	Cella Dwellas	3:48
16.	"Land of the Lost"	Outlaw; Gerald; Ellis; Mel Tormé; Robert Wells	The Bluez Brothers	4:39
Total length:				1:04:19

Sample credits

- Track 3 contains excerpts from "Winter Sadness" written by Claydes Charles Smith and Ronald Bell, and performed by Kool & the Gang.
- Track 5 contains excerpts from "In the Rain" written by Tony Hester and performed by The Dramatics.
- Track 8 contains excerpts from "Go On And Cry" performed by Les McCann.
- Track 16 contains excerpts from "Born To Be Blue" written by Mel Tormé and Robert Wells.

== Personnel ==
- Alando "U.G." Outlaw – vocals, producer (tracks: 7, 15), mixing (tracks: 2, 4–15), executive producer, sleeve notes
- Christopher "Phantasm" Gerald – vocals, producer (tracks: 7, 15), mixing (tracks: 2, 4–15), executive producer, sleeve notes
- A. "Baybe" Evans – vocals (track 3)
- Nicholas C. "Nick Wiz" Loizides – producer (tracks: 1, 3, 5, 6, 8, 9, 11, 13, 14), mixing (tracks: 1, 3), engineering (tracks: 1–5, 7, 9, 11, 14)
- Andrew "DJ Slice" Smith – bassline (tracks: 1, 3, 5, 6, 8, 9, 13, 14), scratches (track 3), keyboards programming (track 7), keyboards finessing (track 9)
- Marlon "DJ Megahurtz" Earle – producer (tracks: 2, 4), scratches (track 5)
- Troy Hightower – engineering (tracks: 6, 8, 12, 13, 16)
- Reginald "Lord Digga" Ellis – producer (tracks: 10, 16)
- Norman "Witchdoctor" Glover – producer (tracks: 10, 16)
- Carlos Bess – engineering (tracks: 10, 15)
- S. "Gatman" Pile – producer (track 12)
- Tom Coyne – mastering
- Matteo "Matt Life" Glen – executive producer, A&R
- Schott "Free" Jacobs – executive producer, A&R
- Benoît Peverelli – photography
- Mike Magnaye – management, sleeve notes

== Charts ==
Chart (1996)	Peak position
US Billboard 200	160
US Top R&B/Hip-Hop Albums (Billboard)	21
