= Juvenile Hell =

Studio album by Mobb Deep
- Released: April 13, 1993
- Recorded: June 1992 – January 1993
- Studio: Unique (New York City)
- Genre: East Coast hip-hop; hardcore hip-hop
- Length: 44:46
- Label: 4th & B'way; Island
- Producer: Mobb Deep; DJ Premier; Large Professor; Dale Hogan; Keith Spencer; Kerwin Young; Paul Shabazz

Mobb Deep chronology
Juvenile Hell (1993)	The Infamous (1995)

Singles from Juvenile Hell
- 1. "Peer Pressure" Released: September 28, 1992; 2. "Hit It from the Back" Released: March 9, 1993

Juvenile Hell is the debut studio album by American hip-hop duo Mobb Deep. It was recorded when they were still in their late teens and released on April 13, 1993, through 4th & B'way Records. Juvenile Hell was recorded between 1992 and 1993 and features production from DJ Premier & Large Professor. The album produced the two singles "Peer Pressure" and "Hit It from the Back". Upon its release the album failed to chart and shortly after the duo was dropped from their label.

== Critical reception ==
Professional ratings
Review scores
Source	Rating
AllMusic	2.5/5 stars
The Source	3.5/5 stars

The San Diego Union-Tribune wrote that Juvenile Hell "arrives well rapped, and the duo's slow, sure, muscular delivery is jazzed up nicely".

== Track listing ==
No.	Title	Producer(s)	Length
1.	"Intro"	Havoc	0:47
2.	"Me & My Crew"	Dale Hogan; Keith Spencer	4:46
3.	"Locked in Spofford"	Kerwin Young; Paul Shabazz	3:51
4.	"Peer Pressure"	DJ Premier	4:15
5.	"Skit #1"	Havoc	0:19
6.	"Hold Down the Fort"	Havoc	4:07
7.	"Bitch Ass Nigga"	Kerwin Young; Paul Shabazz	3:24
8.	"Hit It from the Back"	Prodigy; Method Max	4:14
9.	"Skit #2"	Havoc	0:44
10.	"Stomp Em Out" (featuring Big Noyd)	Prodigy	3:34
11.	"Skit #3"	Havoc	0:15
12.	"Peer Pressure (The Large Professor Mix)"	Large Professor	4:13
13.	"Project Hallways"	Kerwin Young; Paul Shabazz	4:11
14.	"Flavor for the Non Believes"	Kerwin Young	3:57

== Singles chart positions ==
Year	Song	Chart positions
Year	Song	Hot Rap Singles
1993	"Hit It from the Back"	18
