= Cella Dwellas =

American hip hop group

- Also known as: The Dwellas
- Origin: Brooklyn, New York
- Genres: Alternative Hip Hop
- Years active: 1993–2003, 2011–Present
- Label: Loud Records
- Members: UG the Imagination; Phantasm the Tall Man

Cella Dwellas are an underground hip hop duo from Flatbush, Brooklyn, consisting of emcees UG and Phantasm. The group is largely known for their dark beats and lyricism. In 1997, the duo shortened their name simply to The Dwellas.

== Recording history ==
In 1994, the Cella Dwellas signed to prominent hip hop label Loud Records, and released their debut single, "Land of the Lost" which showcased UG’s lyrical skills, as he laid down a verse that is still regarded as classic. The following year, the duo made one of their earliest appearances on the Masta Ace Incorporated album Sittin' on Chrome, featured on the track "4 Da Mind" which featured a verse by Phantasm. Also in 1995, the Dwellas released a pair of singles, "Good Dwellas" and "Perfect Match", which were the duo's only charting singles. "Land of the Lost", a sequel to "Good Dwellas" and "Perfect Match" were included on the duo's 1996 debut Realms 'N Reality. The album was a moderate underground success, debuting at #160 on the Billboard 200 album chart, #21 on the R&B/Hip-Hop chart, and #10 on the Heatseekers chart. The majority of the album was produced by Nick Wiz, and it also featured beats from DJ Megahurtz, The Bluez Brothers, and the duo themselves. The album received considerable acclaim from both critics and underground fans, due to its unique lyrical style and dark, atmospheric production. Allmusic writer Michael Di Bella describes the album's style as a combination of "Dungeons and Dragons-style role-playing games, horror flicks, slick, rugged beats, and imaginative, often humorous lyrics", and called the album "an exciting and bizarre ride through two warped intellects."

UG and Phantasm returned in 2000 with a simplified name, The Dwellas, and released their second album, The Last Shall Be First, through Loud Records. The album again featured production from Nick Wiz, as well as star beat-makers like Large Professor, Ayatollah and Rockwilder. Guests on the album included Large Professor, Inspectah Deck, Cocoa Brovaz, and Organized Konfusion. The album received moderately positive reviews, but received little attention, failing to reach any Billboard chart. The album's singles, "Stand Up", "Leakage" and "Game of Death", all failed to reach the Billboard singles chart. Allmusic once again praised the album. Writer Jon Azpiri stated that the duo could "more than hold their own among hip-hop heavyweights" and said, “After listening to The Last Shall Be First, it's clear that the Dwellas have risen to another level."

For many years after The Last Shall Be First, Cella Dwellas were silent; until 2011, their only release was a 2003 single titled "Who Killed the Hip Hop", released in 2003. As of 2011, the duo had renamed themselves back to the Cella Dwellas and had released a new song, “I Put It Down”, produced by Nick Wiz.

== Discography ==
=== Albums ===
Year	Title	Chart positions	
Year	Title	U.S. Billboard 200	U.S. R&B
1996	Realms 'n Reality: Released: March 26, 1996; Label: Loud	160	21
2000	The Last Shall Be First: Released: September 26, 2000; Label: Loud	–	–

=== Guest appearances ===
- "Lyricist Lounge" and "Cypha Session III - Has Words" (from the Underground Airplay #3 compilation, 1994)
- "4 Da Mind" (from the Masta Ace Incorporated album Sittin' on Chrome, 1995)
- "Mad Hardcore" (from the Kaotic Styles single "Mad Hardcore", 1997)
- "Cranium (Remix)" (from the Gauge single "Cranium", 1998)
- "Menage a Trois" (from the Brixx album Everything Happens for a Reason, 1999)
- "The Main Event" (from the Main One single "The Main Event", 1999)
- "The Introduction" (from the Ran Reed single "The Introduction", 1999)
- "Bring it to Me" (from the Gauge single "Bring it to Me", 2000)
- "Verbal Confrontation" (from the Main One single "Verbal Confrontation", 2001)
- "Lyrical Fight" (from the Saïan Supa Crew album X-Raisons, 2002)
- "Paris New York" (from the Rost album La Voix Du Peuple, 2004)
- "What Happenz" featuring U.G. (From IDEs album Force Fed, 2007)
- "Connect 4" featuring U.G. (from the Shabaam Sahdeeq album "Relentless", 2008)
- "We Not Playing" featuring U.G. (from the Ill Bill mixtape "Howie Made Me Do It 2", 2011)
- "Rapid Fire" (from the Celph Titled & Buckwild album "Nineteen Ninety More", 2011)
- "Vintage 90s" featuring U.G. (from the CHG Unfadable single "Vintage 90s", 2015)
- "This Far" (from The Good People album "Good for Nuthin", 2019)
- "Represent, Part 2" (from the Sléo album L'essence du Kombat, 1996)
