= The Infamous =

Studio album by Mobb Deep
- Released: April 25, 1995
- Recorded: 1994
- Studios: Battery; Platinum Island; Firehouse; Unique (New York City)
- Genres: East Coast hip-hop; gangsta rap; hardcore hip-hop; boom bap; jazz rap
- Length: 66:51
- Labels: Loud; RCA; BMG
- Producers: Mobb Deep; the Abstract

Mobb Deep chronology
Juvenile Hell (1993)	The Infamous (1995)	Hell on Earth (1996)

Singles from The Infamous
- 1. "Shook Ones, Part II" Released: February 7, 1995; 2. "Survival of the Fittest" Released: May 29, 1995; 3. "Temperature's Rising" Released: September 18, 1995; 4. "Give Up the Goods (Just Step)" Released: January 22, 1996

The Infamous (stylized as The Infamous...) is the second studio album by the American hip hop duo Mobb Deep, released on April 25, 1995, by Loud Records. The album features guest appearances by Nas, Raekwon, Ghostface Killah, and Q-Tip. It was largely produced by group member Havoc, with Q-Tip also contributing production while serving as the mixing engineer. Most of the leftover songs from the album became bonus tracks for Mobb Deep's The Infamous Mobb Deep album (2014).

Upon its release, The Infamous achieved notable commercial success, debuting at number 18 on the US Billboard 200 and number 3 on the Top R&B/Hip Hop Albums charts. On February 21, 2020, the album was certified Platinum by the Recording Industry Association of America (RIAA). The album produced four singles; "Shook Ones, Part II", "Survival of the Fittest", "Temperature's Rising", "Give Up the Goods (Just Step)"; the first three singles achieved varying degrees of chart success, with "Shook Ones, Part II" being the most successful.

The album's dark style, defined by its evocative melodies, rugged beats, and introspective lyrics concerning crime in New York's inner city neighborhoods, received special recognition and critical praise. Along with albums such as Enter the Wu-Tang (36 Chambers), Illmatic and Ready to Die, The Infamous is widely credited as a major contributor to the East Coast Renaissance. Furthermore, the album is credited with helping to redefine the sound of hardcore hip hop, using its production style, which incorporated eerie piano loops, distorted synthesizers, eighth-note hi-hats, and sparse filtered basslines. In 2020, the album was ranked 369th on Rolling Stone's updated list of the 500 Greatest Albums of All Time.

== Background ==
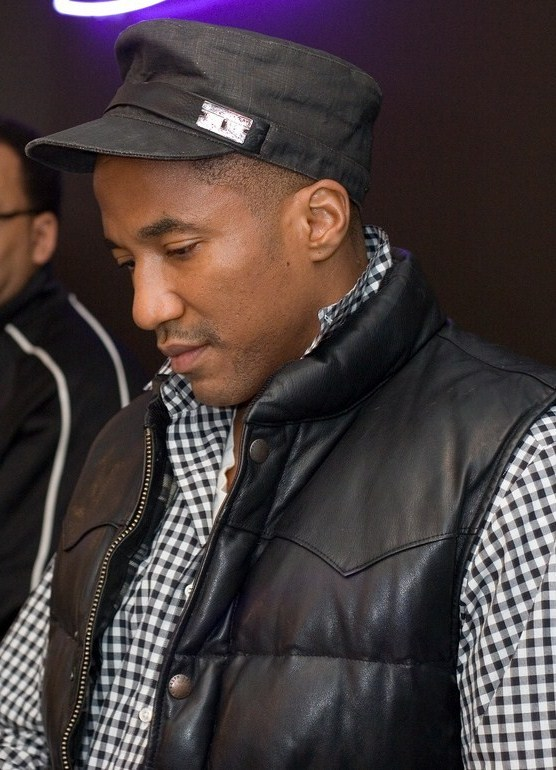
Q-Tip played an important role in the album's production and mixing

During the spring of 1993, while the group was still in their late teens, Mobb Deep released their first album Juvenile Hell under the 4th & B'way Records label. The album included production from several revered New York-based producers, including Large Professor, DJ Premier, and Public Enemy affiliate Kerwin Young, and included the underground hit single "Hit It from the Back". Due to Juvenile Hell's failure to achieve significant commercial and critical success, the duo was dropped from their label several months after the album's release. Havoc and Prodigy later described Juvenile Hell as a "learning experience".

During the summer of 1993, Loud Records was looking for another group to sign, owing to the success of Wu-Tang Clan's first single, "Protect Ya Neck", and by fall 1993, the label had signed Mobb Deep. In 1994, the group released the promotional single "Shook Ones", which served as a preview of their new sound. Unlike the duo's first album, The Infamous was mostly self-produced by Havoc and Prodigy, with outside help from Loud A&R representatives Matt Life (aka Matty C) and Schott Free, as well as A Tribe Called Quest producer Q-Tip, who discovered Mobb Deep in the early 1990s. Matt Life later recalled Q-Tip's involvements, stating, "Tip was very involved in The Infamous from early on. Probably more than people know. Tip was just a fan of theirs and I knew him from way back, so he was really helpful, giving them advice." Q-Tip's contributions to the album were credited under his alias "The Abstract".

On the group's decision to handle most of the production, Havoc later commented, "We started producing because other producers was giving us shit that we didn't like, or they was just charging too much. I didn't know nothing about producing music at the time, but I learned by watching others."

Prodigy later revealed that Nas' 1994 album Illmatic heavily influenced Mobb Deep when making The Infamous, saying that the Illmatic album made them look at themselves and helped them realize that they had not told their story correctly when they made Juvenile Hell. Nas himself makes a guest appearance in the song "Eye for a Eye (Your Beef Is Mines)" in The Infamous.

== Recording and production ==
Recording sessions for The Infamous began in 1994 and took place at Battery Studios, Platinum Island Studios, Firehouse Studios and Unique Recording in New York City. Havoc produced most of the beats in his Queensbridge apartment, with Prodigy often assisting him; earlier in their career, Prodigy taught him how to sample. Describing their minimal production setup, Prodigy said, "Our first sampler we had was an EPS-16 Plus... We had that for a little while, and when the MPC came out we bought that, and that was it. A little record player, a little mixer, and that's all we needed."

Mobb Deep initially recorded 20 songs for The Infamous, but executive producers Matt Life and Schott Free worked with them to improve the music. Matt Life recalled, "Schott worked closely with them on how the rhymes were coming and I worked closely with them on how production was coming. The first thing that I remember is them creating a semblance of the core of the first album and me creating a rough in-house version of what the album could be and throwing a sticker on the cassette." The early rough version of the album contained five or six songs, including the original versions of the album's four singles. The original "Temperature's Rising" was remade because of sample clearance issues.

Later on, Q-Tip became the album's mixing engineer; Matt Life explained, "he came in later in the sessions and said he'd help mix a couple records. And then he ended up picking a couple of records they did to re-do. Except for 'Drink Away the Pain', the songs that Tip produced were already a full song before he got to them. He liked the lyrics on those original songs, but he re-did the beats. It was the same song title, same hook, same rhymes, just new beats." Q-Tip also improved the drum programming on "Survival of the Fittest", "Up North Trip" and "Trife Life". Describing his contributions as "a totally different sound than the Tribe stuff", Q-Tip encouraged Mobb Deep to make their dark sound stand out, by telling them to add major chords to their minor key samples. Havoc later stated, "Q-Tip definitely bent his style a little bit to get with what we was doing. Like with 'Drink Away the Pain' you see him trying to get gangsta with it." Schott Free summed up Q-Tip's influence:

The album was pretty tight, but once Tip comes around he hears different things. He changes kicks, snares, whatever. Also, you get to watch Havoc implement what he had already known with a cat like Tip and Tip showing him everything he knew. Showing him a format, a formula, and even how to double on the kicks. It's just kinda ill how he just came in and just cleaned it up. His influence is mostly sonically. Playing any of those records in the club, the drums and everything is big. Tip was always a master of making a record sound huge.

Lyrically, Mobb Deep added to the album's dark aesthetic. Speaking about his verse on "Survival of the Fittest", Havoc explained, "We were just straight hood. It wasn't no pretty boy shit. It was like, 'Yo, let's throw on our Timbs.' It didn't get more harder than that." On each track, they rapped about the realities of prison, murder, robbery, selling drugs and alcoholism, among other topics. Big Noyd had a significant presence on the album, with four guest appearances; discussing the "Just Step Prelude", Prodigy recalled, "That shit right there, that was a rhyme that Noyd used to kick in the projects everyday to niggas ... He'd spit that shit that had the whole block going crazy." Big Noyd initially preferred to sell drugs and had no desire to be a rapper, until the group convinced him otherwise. The remaining guest appearances happened in various ways; Nas was a childhood friend of Havoc, Raekwon and Ghostface Killah of Wu-Tang Clan were Mobb Deep's labelmates and Crystal Johnson was an associate of Q-Tip.

== Cover artwork ==
The cover art for The Infamous was created in Queensbridge Houses, New York by photographer Delphine A. Fawundu, who later commented about the photography session in Vikki Tobak's 2018 analog hip hop photography collective Contact High: A Visual History of Hip-Hop (published by Clarkson Potter), "I was inspired by how all these elements came together, making New York hip-hop such a force at that time. It just felt so powerful and it was all happening right before my eyes, and my camera". In 2019, images from Fawundu's photoshoot with Mobb Deep and the previously unseen contact prints were featured in a full-size museum exhibit at The Annenberg Space for Photography in Los Angeles.

== Reception ==
=== Commercial performance ===
The album spent 18 weeks on the US Billboard 200, peaking at number 18, and it also spent 34 weeks on the Top R&B/Hip-Hop Albums charts, peaking at number 3. The Infamous was certified gold, with shipments of 500,000 copies in the United States by the Recording Industry Association of America (RIAA) on June 26, 1995. On February 21, 2020, the album was certified platinum by the RIAA. The singles "Shook Ones, Part II" and "Survival of the Fittest" reached number 59 and 69 on the Billboard Hot 100, respectively, and also reached the Top 10 on the Hot Rap Singles chart.

=== Initial reaction ===
Professional ratings
Review scores
Source	Rating
AllMusic	5/5 stars
Consequence of Sound	A
Entertainment Weekly	B+
Los Angeles Times	3.5/4 stars
NME	8/10
Pitchfork	10/10
Rolling Stone	4/5 stars
The Rolling Stone Album Guide	5/5 stars
The Source	4.5/5 stars
Spin	9/10

Upon its release, The Infamous received widespread critical acclaim. Los Angeles Times critic Heidi Siegmund wrote that Mobb Deep "may be the toughest young force in hip-hop", noting their "slow, stealthy beats" and "dark poetic talents". NME remarked that the duo "bring the clipped, rolling style of Rakim or EPMD, adding a chill menace to neighborhood boasts like 'Right Back at You' and 'Eye for a Eye'." Entertainment Weekly's Tiarra Mukherjee likewise noted their "mostly self-produced, bare-bones beats" and lyrics, which "paint a chilling picture of life on their mean streets, New York City's Queensbridge Housing Projects", concluding, "Underground rap-heads – and those who can break away from Jeep beats – will rejoice." Spin journalist Chris Norris highlighted the bleak lyrical content of the album, which he described as "state-of-the-art East Coast reportage: drug-selling, police-fleeing, and homie-dying vignettes, all told with vivid detail and a deadpan thousand-yard flow". Norris also found that the album's production transcended the conventions associated with East Coast hip hop beats, instead "mixing warm, old Quest-style Blue Note whispers, gritty snares, and stark keyboard chimes like Satie or Bill Evans with an MPC-60."

Elliott Wilson from Vibe was highly positive in his appraisal of the album: "Each song is a different chapter in the hard street life Havoc and Prodigy have experienced in their Queensbridge neighborhood ... While describing their lives with brutal realism and raw imagery, Havoc's love for his hometown hits you in the head like a Mike Tyson comeback punch." The Source's Dimitry Leger stated, "Mobb Deep earn credibility, winning the crucial battle between style and substance, who's real and who's a move-faker. Havoc and Prodigy simply report what they know." Writing for Rolling Stone, Cheo H. Coker called it "a darkly nihilistic masterpiece".

== Legacy ==
Since its initial release, The Infamous has earned additional critical praise and has been widely regarded as a cornerstone album of New York hardcore rap. AllMusic's Steve Huey wrote that it stands as "Mobb Deep's masterpiece, a relentlessly bleak song cycle that's been hailed by hardcore rap fans as one of the most realistic gangsta albums ever recorded [...] it has all the foreboding atmosphere and thematic sweep of an epic crime drama. That's partly because of the cinematic vision behind the duo's detailed narratives, but it's also a tribute to how well the raw, grimy production evokes the world that Mobb Deep is depicting." According to Consequence of Sound's Okla Jones, it "solidified Mobb Deep in hip-hop lore" and became "the blueprint for the traditional New York hardcore sound".

In 2002, The Source reappraised The Infamous and gave it a perfect five-mic rating, stating: "Prodigy's thugged-out entertainment and Havoc's sonic production on cuts like the bone-chilling 'Shook Ones Pt. ll' ... proved to be timeless street joints in the same vein as 'Life's a Bitch' and 'You Gots to Chill.' The album was a staple for all hardheaded delinquents comin' up in the game." In 2004's The New Rolling Stone Album Guide, critic Chris Ryan called it "one of the greatest rap albums of the [1990s]". XXL magazine gave it a classic rating of "XXL" in its retrospective December 2007 issue. In 2013, hip-hop journalist Jeff "Chairman" Mao hailed The Infamous as "an iconic New York record", while noting Q-Tip's understated role in its creation. Reviewing the album's 2014 reissue, Pitchfork critic Jayson Greene remarked on its lasting impact:

With The Infamous, Mobb Deep invented a feeling, one that was more important than any individual word, chorus, or rhyme. All of New York was embracing degraded production at the time, but Havoc pushed beyond the low-resolution samples of RZA's Enter the Wu-Tang (36 Chambers) into near-total abstraction, producing a masterpiece of low, muffled, and malevolent sounds... Appropriately, The Infamous also marked the moment that the language in gangsta rap shifted from corner scrambles and specific vendettas to all-out war, endless and impersonal... This was the logical conclusion to the lyrical (and literal) arms race in mid-90s gangsta rap; Mobb Deep got all the way to the end first, and said everything best.

In 2025, Pitchfork ranked The Infamous number one in its 100 Best Rap Albums of All Time article.

== In popular culture ==
Jazz musician Benny Reid paid homage to The Infamous with the March 2023 release of The Infamous Live with Havoc's co-sign. With the assistance of Fat Beats Records, Reid was able to recreate 13 tracks from The Infamous as a contemporary instrumental album.

Benny Reid explained to AllHipHop:

When the opportunity presented itself to reimagine Mobb Deep's The Infamous, I began with its crown jewel, 'Shook Ones', and I immediately got lost in the source material, my focus became translating lyric to melody and the sublime textures to harmony. With Havoc's blessing, I embarked on a two-year journey, stretching the boundaries of my acoustic instruments and jazz background to instrumentally rebirth The Infamous Live.

== Track listing ==
No.	Title	Writer(s)	Producer(s)	Length
1.	"The Start of Your Ending (41st Side)"	Albert Johnson; Kejuan Muchita	Mobb Deep	4:24
2.	"The Infamous Prelude"			2:12
3.	"Survival of the Fittest"	Johnson; Muchita	Mobb Deep	3:43
4.	"Eye for a Eye (Your Beef Is Mines)" (featuring Nas and Raekwon the Chef)	Johnson; Muchita; Nasir Jones; Corey Woods	Mobb Deep	4:48
5.	"Just Step Prelude"	Johnson; TaJuan Perry		1:06
6.	"Give Up the Goods (Just Step)" (featuring Big Noyd)	Johnson; Muchita; Perry; Jonathan Davis; Mayfield Small, Jr.	The Abstract	4:02
7.	"Temperature's Rising" (featuring Crystal Johnson)	Johnson; Muchita; Davis; Patrice Rushen; Freddie Washington	The Abstract; Mobb Deep (co.)	5:00
8.	"Up North Trip"	Johnson; Muchita	Mobb Deep	4:58
9.	"Trife Life"	Johnson; Muchita; Michael Henderson	Mobb Deep	5:19
10.	"Q.U. – Hectic"	Johnson; Muchita	Mobb Deep	4:46
11.	"Right Back at You" (featuring Ghostface Killah, Raekwon the Chef and Big Noyd)	Johnson; Muchita; Dennis Coles; Woods; Perry	Mobb Deep; Schott Free (co.)	4:52
12.	"The Grave Prelude"			0:50
13.	"Cradle to the Grave"	Johnson; Muchita	Mobb Deep	4:57
14.	"Drink Away the Pain (Situations)" (featuring Q-Tip)	Johnson; Muchita; Davis; The Headhunters	The Abstract; Mobb Deep (co.)	4:44
15.	"Shook Ones, Pt. II"	Johnson; Muchita	Mobb Deep	5:24
16.	"Party Over" (featuring Big Noyd)	Johnson; Muchita; Perry	Mobb Deep; Matt Life (co.)	5:40
Total length:				66:51

25th Anniversary Expanded Edition
No.	Title	Writer(s)	Producer(s)	Length
17.	"Shook Ones, Part I (Original Version)"	Johnson; Muchita	Mobb Deep	4:15
18.	"The Money (Version 2) (Infamous Sessions Mix)"	Johnson; Muchita	Mobb Deep	4:34
19.	"Lifestyles of the Infamous (Infamous Sessions Mix)"	Johnson; Muchita	Mobb Deep	4:06
20.	"Shook Ones, Pt. I (Instrumental)"	Johnson; Muchita	Mobb Deep	4:12
21.	"Shook Ones, Pt. II (Instrumental)"	Johnson; Muchita	Mobb Deep	4:37

- "Up North Trip" is omitted from cassette versions.

Sample credits

- "The Start of Your Ending" contains a sample from "Lover's Chant" performed by Dee Dee Warwick.
- "Survival of the Fittest" contains a sample from "Skylark" performed by The Barry Harris Trio and Al Cohn.
- "Eye for a Eye" contains a sample from "I Wish You Were Here" performed by Al Green.
- "Give Up the Goods" contains a sample from "That's All Right With Me" performed by Esther Phillips.
- "Temperature's Rising" contains samples from "UFO" performed by ESG, "Where There Is Love" performed by Patrice Rushen, and an interpolation of "Body Heat" performed by Quincy Jones.
- "Up North Trip" contains samples from "To Be With You" performed by The Fatback Band, and "I'm Tired Of Giving" performed by The Spinners.
- "Trife Life" contains a sample from "You Are My Starship" performed by Norman Connors.
- "Q.U.-Hectic" contains samples from "Kitty With the Bent Frame" performed by Quincy Jones, and "Black Frost" performed by Grover Washington Jr.
- "Right Back at You" contains a sample from "Benjamin" performed by Les McCann.
- "Cradle to the Grave" contains a sample from "And If I Had" performed by Teddy Pendergrass.
- "Drink Away the Pain" contains a sample from "I Remember I Made You Cry" performed by The Headhunters and "Fly, Fly, the Route, Shoot" performed by If.
- "Shook Ones, Pt. II" contains samples from "Dirty Feet" performed by Daly Wilson Big Band, "Jessica" performed by Herbie Hancock, and "Kitty With The Bent Frame" performed by Quincy Jones.
- "Party Over" contains samples from "Lonely Fire" performed by Miles Davis, and "Outside Love" performed by Brethren.

== Personnel ==
- Havoc – performer, producer
- Prodigy – performer, producer
- The Abstract – performer, producer, mixing
- Big Noyd – performer
- Raekwon – performer
- Nas – performer
- Ghostface Killah – performer
- Crystal Johnson – vocals
- Matt Life – producer
- Schott Free – producer
- Fal Prod – producer
- Louis Alfred III – engineer
- Tim Latham – engineer
- Tony Smalios – engineer, mixing
- Dino Zerros – engineer
- Leon Zervos – mastering
- Merge One – art direction
- Chi Modu – photography

== Charts ==
=== Weekly charts ===
Chart (1995)	Peak position
UK Albums (Official Charts Company)	111
US Billboard 200	18
US Top R&B/Hip-Hop Albums (Billboard)	3

=== Year-end charts ===
Chart (1995)	Position
US Billboard 200	180
US Top R&B/Hip-Hop Albums	34

== Certifications ==
Region	Certification	Certified units/sales
Denmark (IFPI Danmark)	Gold	10,000^{‡}
New Zealand (RMNZ)	Gold	7,500^{‡}
United Kingdom (BPI)	Gold	100,000^{‡}
United States (RIAA)	Platinum	1,000,000^{‡}
^{‡} Sales+streaming figures based on certification alone.

== Accolades ==
- An asterisk (*) indicates unordered lists.

Publication	Country	Accolade	Year	Rank
About.com	United States	100 Greatest Hip Hop Albums	2008	74
About.com	United States	Best Rap Albums of 1995	2008	4
Blender	United States	500 CDs You Must Own Before You Die	2003	*
Rolling Stone	United States	The 500 Greatest Albums of All Time	2020	369
Pitchfork	United States	The 100 Best Rap Albums of All Time	2025	1
The Source	United States	The 100 Best Rap Albums of All Time	1998	*
Vibe	United States	51 Albums representing a Generation, a Sound and a Movement	2004	*
Hip Hop Connection	United Kingdom	The 100 Greatest Rap Albums 1995–2005	2005	4
Melody Maker	United Kingdom	Albums of the Year	1995	28
Pop	Sweden	Albums of the Year	1995	11
OOR	Netherlands	Albums of the Year	1995	43
Spex	Germany	Albums of the Year	1995	13
