= Crystal Johnson (singer) =

American singer and songwriter

- Genres: Broadway; gospel; hip hop; house; jazz fusion; R&B
- Occupations: Singer; songwriter
- Instruments: Vocals; Keyboards
- Years active: 1992–present
- Labels: Uptown; Sony; EFM (Egyptian Fusion Music)

Crystal Johnson is an American singer and songwriter from Brooklyn, New York. She has performed in a variety of stage productions and has collaborated with a wide array of well-known artists including Anthony Hamilton, Dr. Dre, Heavy D, Mobb Deep, Pete Rock & CL Smooth, Angie Stone, Usher and many others.

== Early career ==
At the age of 7, Crystal recorded with Pink Floyd and the Institutional Children’s Choir in Brooklyn, New York. Several years later she became the first actress to be cast as the lead character, Doris Winter, in the original version of the musical Mama, I Want to Sing!. The inaugural performance of the play premiered in 1980 at Harlem's Amas Musical Theatre (formerly known as the AMAS Repertory Theatre, Inc.) which was founded by Rosetta LeNoire.

In 1988, Crystal made her Broadway debut in The Gospel at Colonus at the Lunt-Fontanne Theatre. The cast included Academy Award winner Morgan Freeman, Robert Earl Jones, the Soul Stirrers, and the Five Blind Boys of Alabama. Crystal and many of the original cast members participated in the 2018 reunion of The Gospel at Colonus at the Delacorte Theater in New York's Central Park.

== 1992–1993: Songwriter and producer ==
In 1992, after discussions between various record label executives including Quincy Jones, Crystal signed a production deal with Andre Harrell’s label Uptown Records. During her time with Uptown, she was a vocal coach for artists such as Grammy Award winner Usher and Total.

She co-wrote "Anything You Ask" with Howie Tee performed by Tara Kemp from the American comedy film Class Act, starring Hip Hop duo Kid 'n Play. She is a writer, producer, vocal arranger, and lead vocalist on the song “Lovin' You" from the Who's The Man? soundtrack, as well as an arranger and lyricist for the album, which reached #8 on the Billboard US Top R&B/Hip-Hop albums chart and #32 on the US Billboard 200 in 1993.

== 1994–1999: Gold and Platinum albums ==
Crystal achieved notable success as a vocalist on several hip hop albums during the mid to late 1990's. She provided background vocals on Usher's debut album Usher which reached #167 on the US Billboard 200 chart, #25 on the Billboard Top R&B/Hip-Hop Albums chart and #4 on the Billboard Heatseekers Albums chart.

She is the lead vocalist on "Got Me Waiting" from Heavy D and the Boyz's album Nuttin' But Love which topped the Billboard US Rap albums chart, reached #20 on the Billboard Hot 100 and is RIAA certified platinum. Heavy D also enlisted her as a vocalist, along with recording artist Monifah, for his remix of Gerald Levert's "Answering Service".

Crystal co-wrote and is the featured vocalist on "Take You There" from The Main Ingredient with Pete Rock & CL Smooth, which reached #33 on the Billboard US Hot Rap Singles chart and #76 on the US Hot 100 chart. The Main Ingredient reached #8 on the Billboard US Top R&B/Hip-Hop albums chart and #51 on the Hot 100 chart. She performed "Take You There" and "In the House" with Pete Rock & CL Smooth live on the Jon Stewart Show.

Q-Tip was working with Havoc and Prodigy of Mobb Deep as a producer for their album The Infamous when he brought Crystal in to lay down the vocals on their song "Temperature's Rising", which reached #3 on the Billboard Top R&B/Hip Hop Albums chart and is RIAA certified gold. The group also called upon Crystal to sing the hook on the remixes for "Survival of the Fittest" and "The After Hours G.O.D. Pt. III". Mobb Deep’s surviving member, Havoc, released a 25th Anniversary Edition of ‘’The Infamous’’ in early 2020.

Lord Finesse, Royce da 5'9" and Crystal collaborated to write "The Message" featuring Mary J. Blige and Rell from Dr. Dre's multi-platinum second album 2001. The album peaked at #2 on the Billboard Hot 100 and is RIAA certified multi-platimum with over 6 million copies sold.

== 2000–2010: Additional collaborations ==
Crystal co-wrote “Cinderella Ballin’” with Angie Stone the album Stone Love, where she also provides background vocals on the track. Mike City and Crystal share lead vocals on the House music inspired single "More of Me" from his album The Feel Good Agenda, Vol. 1. She is the lead vocalist on “Who Am I” which she co-wrote with Josh Milan, who released the song on the compilation Josh Milan Presents: Honeycomb Music Vol. 1.

== 2011–2020: Independent productions ==
In 2011, Crystal's self-written, self-produced album entitled The Day Before Heaven was released on her label, EFM (Egyptian Fusion Music). The album includes fourteen songs, and the single "Come Home" was later remixed featuring Phife Dawg.

In 2016, she wrote, produced, directed and starred in her autobiographical play The Day Before Heaven. Music producer Easy Mo Bee also starred in the play which premiered on May 5, 2016 at the Kumble Theater for the Performing Arts at LIU Brooklyn.

== Discography ==
- The Day Before Heaven (2011)
