= Hell on Earth (Mobb Deep album) =

Studio album by Mobb Deep
- Released: November 19, 1996
- Studios: Platinum Island Recording Studios (New York City); Axis Recording Studios (New York City)
- Genres: East Coast hip-hop; hardcore hip-hop
- Length: 61:35 (North America); 65:47 (international)
- Labels: Loud; RCA
- Producer: Mobb Deep

Mobb Deep chronology
The Infamous (1995)	Hell on Earth (1996)	Murda Muzik (1999)

Singles from Hell On Earth
- 1. "Still Shinin'" Released: 1996; 2. "Drop a Gem on 'Em" Released: August 25, 1996; 3. "Front Lines (Hell on Earth)" Released: October 4, 1996; 4. "G.O.D. Pt. III" Released: April 15, 1997

Hell on Earth is the third studio album by the American hip-hop duo Mobb Deep, released on November 19, 1996, through Loud and RCA Records. The follow-up to the critically acclaimed The Infamous (1995), Hell on Earth was produced by group member Havoc and features guest appearances from rappers Nas, Raekwon, Method Man, and frequent collaborator Big Noyd, among others. The album includes the acclaimed singles "G.O.D. Pt. III" and "Front Lines (Hell on Earth)," as well as "Drop a Gem on 'Em," a response to 2Pac's diss track "Hit 'Em Up." A promotional single, "Still Shinin'", was released earlier that year and later added to the album.

The album, one of the earliest enhanced CDs, also contains an additional track ("In the Long Run") that at the time, had to be unlocked with the use of a computer. The album garnered widespread acclaim from critics, and was certified gold by the Recording Industry Association of America on April 9, 1997.

== Background ==
Since most of the album was recorded during the height of the East Coast-West Coast rivalry, many fans considered the darker songs to be subtle disses toward 2Pac and other West Coast emcees, but Prodigy sends shout-outs to a list of West Coast artists such as Snoop Dogg, Tha Dogg Pound, and Xzibit in the liner notes.

== Music ==
Building on the sound of The Infamous, Havoc experimented with an eerie, atmospheric style of production, sampling pianos, string sections, and film scores. Like Mobb Deep's two previous albums, the lyrics explore themes of crime and violence, with more of a focus on retribution and payback.

== Reception ==
Professional ratings
Review scores
Source	Rating
AllMusic	4.5/5 stars
Entertainment Weekly	B+
Los Angeles Times	3/4 stars
Muzik	3/5 stars
Q	4/5 stars
RapReviews	8.5/10
The Rolling Stone Album Guide	4/5 stars
The Source	4.5/5 stars
Spin	8/10

Hell on Earth was met with widespread acclaim from music critics. Selwyn Seyfu Hinds of The Source praised Prodigy for "painting an endless series of chilling, near-surreal cinemascapes", also stating that Havoc "comes through with a surprisingly high octane performance". He concluded that Mobb Deep were "the most intense, most authentic, most powerful practitioners" of East Coast hardcore hip-hop during the 1990s. Los Angeles Times writer Cheo Hodari Coker called it "just as alluring, pessimistic and downright scary" as The Infamous, adding that "with Scorsese-like finesse, Mobb Deep serves up its underworld with such verve that even the most brutal characters glow with respectful purpose". Sacha Jenkins of Spin believed that the album "pursues retribution like Charles Bronson in the Death Wish flicks", also noting that "very occasionally, you'll hear a longing for sanctuary inside Mobb Deep's insanity". Entertainment Weekly's Matt Diehl described it as a "haunting portrait of New York-style thug life" and a "thumping mix where gunshots clash with eerie strings".

In a retrospective piece, AllMusic critic Steve Huey felt that the album "refines the Mobb Deep formula, amplifying much of what made The Infamous a success. The bleak street narratives are even more violent and extreme, and the production is even grittier and creepier". In The New Rolling Stone Album Guide, Chris Ryan commended Mobb Deep's artistic progression, stating, "If Infamous was a chilling documentary, Hell on Earth is a crime saga of mythical proportions. The stickup kids of the last album become hitmen and corner drug pushers become crime kingpins". The album was included in Q's 50 Heaviest Albums of All Time.

== Track listing ==
- All songs produced by Mobb Deep.

No.	Title	Length
1.	"Animal Instinct" (featuring Twin Gambino & Ty Nitty)	3:30
2.	"Drop a Gem on 'Em"	4:17
3.	"Bloodsport"	3:35
4.	"Extortion" (featuring Method Man)	3:31
5.	"More Trife Life"	3:45
6.	"Man Down" (featuring Big Noyd)	5:03
7.	"Can't Get Enough of It" (featuring General G)	4:51
8.	"Nighttime Vultures" (featuring Raekwon)	4:30
9.	"G.O.D. Pt. III"	5:17
10.	"Get Dealt With"	3:56
11.	"Hell on Earth (Front Lines)"	4:34
12.	"Give It Up Fast" (featuring Big Noyd & Nas)	3:58
13.	"Still Shinin'"	4:11
14.	"Apostle's Warning"	4:07

Bonus track
No.	Title	Length
15.	"In the Long Run" (featuring Ty Nitty & Money No)	2:38

International Version
No.	Title	Length
1.	"Animal Instinct" (featuring Twin Gambino & Ty Nitty)	3:30
2.	"Drop a Gem on 'Em"	4:17
3.	"Bloodsport"	3:35
4.	"Extortion" (featuring Method Man)	3:31
5.	"More Trife Life"	3:45
6.	"Man Down" (featuring Big Noyd)	5:03
7.	"Can't Get Enough of It" (featuring General G)	4:51
8.	"Nighttime Vultures" (featuring Raekwon)	4:30
9.	"G.O.D. Pt. III"	5:17
10.	"Get Dealt With"	3:56
11.	"Shook Ones Pt. I"	4:12
12.	"Hell on Earth (Front Lines)"	4:34
13.	"Give It Up Fast" (featuring Big Noyd & Nas)	3:58
14.	"Still Shinin'"	4:11
15.	"Apostle's Warning"	4:07

== Charts ==
=== Weekly charts ===
Chart (1996)	Peak position
Swedish Albums (Sverigetopplistan)	52
UK Albums (Official Charts)	67
US Billboard 200	6
US Top R&B/Hip-Hop Albums (Billboard)	1

Chart (2026)	Peak position
Belgian Albums (Ultratop Wallonia)	177
German Albums (Offizielle Top 100)	83
German Hip-Hop Albums (Offizielle Top 100)	18

=== Year-end charts ===
Chart (1997)	Position
US Billboard 200	148
US Top R&B/Hip-Hop Albums	35

== Certifications ==
Region	Certification	Certified units/sales
United Kingdom (BPI)	Silver	60,000^{‡}
United States (RIAA)	Gold	500,000^{^}
^{^} Shipments figures based on certification alone.^{‡} Sales+streaming figures based on certification alone.

== See also ==
- List of number-one R&B albums of 1996 (U.S.)
