= Loud Records =

Hip hop record label

Loud Records, LLC.
- Parent company: Bertelsmann Music Group (1991–1999); Sony Music Entertainment (1999–present)
- Founded: 1991; 35 years ago 2007; 19 years ago (revival)
- Founder: Steve Rifkind; Rich Isaacson
- Defunct: 2002; 24 years ago (original)
- Status: Active
- Distributors: Zoo (1991–1992); RCA (1992–1999); Columbia (1999–2002); RED (1998—2000; 2018–2020)
- Genre: Hip-hop; hardcore hip-hop
- Country of origin: United States
- Location: 79 5th. Avenue, New York City, New York 10003, USA
- Official website: loudrecords.shop.musictoday.com

Loud Records, LLC. (a backronym for Listeners of Urban Dialect) is a record label founded by Steve Rifkind, and Rich Isaacson in 1991. Rifkind served as the chief executive officer while Isaacson served as the president of the label.

The label signed numerous artists such as Wu-Tang Clan, Davina, Big Pun, Mobb Deep, Prodigy, Krayzie Bone, The Beatnuts, M.O.P., Tha Alkaholiks, Pete Rock, Lil' Flip, Three 6 Mafia, Project Pat, Xzibit, Twista, Dead Prez, The Dwellas, and The X-Ecutioners. The label also released thrash metal band Megadeth's deluxe and remastered debut album Killing Is My Business... And Business Is Good! in 2002.

== History ==
Rifkind helped the bi-coastal hip-hop label focus on "street-themed" hip-hop. The label was originally distributed by Zoo Entertainment. The label's first release was Runnin' Off at da Mouth by the label's first signee Tung Twista in June 1992. The sole single from the album, "Mr. Tung Twista" would be released in November 1992. Both, the album and single failed to chart and the label would drop Tung Twista. By the end of the year, the label would switch distribution from Zoo to RCA Records.

In 1993, the label's fortune would improve. The label released Look Ma Duke, No Hands by Mad Kap in March, 21 & Over by Tha Alkaholiks in August, and lastly, Enter the Wu-Tang (36 Chambers) by Wu-Tang Clan in November. Enter the Wu-Tang (36 Chambers) would be credited for restoring the East Coast hip-hop scene amidst the West Coast hip-hop dominance during the early 90's. In 1994, through Loud executive Matt Life, Loud signed Unsigned Hype act Mobb Deep after being dropped from their previous label, 4th & B'way Records. The duo released a promotional single "Shook Ones" following their signing. That same year, the label signed Cella Dwellas.

In February 1995, Mobb Deep released "Shook Ones, Part II" as their first single for The Infamous. In the same month, Tha Alkaholiks released their second album Coast II Coast. In April 1995, Mobb Deep released "The Infamous". Further singles from album included "Survival of the Fittest", "Temperature's Rising", and "Give Up the Goods (Just Step)". In August 1995, Raekwon released his debut album Only Built 4 Cuban Linx....

Loud's success led to Rifkind selling 50% of the company to RCA in 1996. In March, Cella Dwellas released their debut album, Realms 'n Reality. Delinquent Habits' released their self titled debut in June. Sadat X of Brand Nubian would released his debut album, Wild Cowboys in July. Xzibit released his debut album, At the Speed of Life in October. The last release for the label in 1996 would be Mobb Deep's third studio album, Hell on Earth released in November. The album's second single, "Drop a Gem on 'Em" was notable for being a response to 2Pac's diss track "Hit 'Em Up" during the height of the East Coast–West Coast hip-hop rivalry.

In 1997, the label signed rapper Big Pun. His debut album, Capital Punishment was released through Loud in April 1998 to critical acclaim and commercial success. The album featured fellow Loud label-mates Inspectah Deck and Prodigy. Peaking in the top 5 on the Billboard 200, the album was certified platinum by the RIAA for selling over a million units in America, making Big Pun the first solo Latin artist to go Platinum.

In 1999, Loud switched distributors from RCA to Columbia Records. As a result of the switch, Mobb Deep's fourth studio album, Murda Muzik was delayed and heavily bootlegged in the process. Despite its bootlegging, the album was a critical and commercial success upon release in August 1999. Murda Muzik debuted and peaked within the top 3 on the Billboard 200, and was certified Platinum in America. That same year, the label signed Memphis, Tennessee-based rap group Three 6 Mafia.

On February 7, 2000, rapper Big Pun died of a heart attack. At the time of his death, he was working on his second and final studio album. It also featured Big Pun's protege and Loud label-mate Remy Ma. That June, Three 6 Mafia released their debut on the label, When the Smoke Clears: Sixty 6, Sixty 1. Debuting in the top 10 on the Billboard 200, the album was certified platinum in the United States. The label closed out 2000 with rapper Xzibit's third studio album, Restless, released through Loud, SRC Records, and Xzibit's Open Bar imprint. The album peaked in the top 15 on the Billboard 200, and went on to be certified platinum by the RIAA.

In March 2002, Sony Music ceased Loud's operations. The last release under Loud was Xzibit's fourth studio album, Man vs. Machine. Following the release of Man vs. Machine, the label officially closed. After the label's closure, Loud's artists either transferred to Sony Urban Music/Columbia or signed to other companies. Three 6 Mafia moved their Hypnotize Minds imprint to Sony Urban Music and Columbia, as did Xzibit and his Open Bar imprint.

In June 2007, Sony Music resurrected the label, after which Rifkind would buy it back, making it a subsidiary of SRC. His 1st act after re-gaining the label was, as he did 15 years earlier, signing the Wu-Tang Clan.

On July 29, 2012, Steve Rifkind announced that he was leaving Universal on September 1, 2012.

On October 6, 2017, after the 2017 BET Hip Hop Awards cipher with 6lack, Tee Grizzley, Little Simz, Mysonne and Axel Leon went live, Axel Leon said that he had made a deal with Rifkind via Instagram. Making Axel Leon the first person to be signed to Loud after Rifkind left Universal.

In 2020, Loud Records announced a re-launch of the label to be fully independent, giving clients the ability to own their masters. The re-launch included changing the name from Loud Records to Loud Music Group. The new label roster includes Rifkind's son, Ryrif.

== Associated labels ==
- Open Bar Entertainment, a record label launched by Loud artist Xzibit in 2000.
- Terror Squad Entertainment, a record label launched in 1997 by rapper Fat Joe, which housed Loud rappers Remy and Big Pun.
- Infamous Records, a record label launched in 2000 by Loud rapper Prodigy
- Hypnotize Minds, a record label launched in 1997 by DJ Paul and Juicy J that housed Loud act Three 6 Mafia.

== Artists ==
- The Alkaholiks
- The Beatnuts
- Big Pun (deceased)
- Cella Dwellas
- Davina
- dead prez
- Delinquent Habits
- Adriana Evans
- Funkmaster Flex
- Gangsta Boo (deceased)
- Havoc
- Inspectah Deck
- Killarmy
- Krayzie Bone
- L.V.
- Lil' Flip
- M.O.P.
- Mad Kap
- Yvette Michele
- Mobb Deep
- No Good
- Prodigy (deceased)
- Project Pat
- Raekwon
- Remy
- Pete Rock
- Sadat X
- Stereomud
- Tash
- Three 6 Mafia
- Tung Twista
- Wu-Tang Clan
- The X-Ecutioners
- Xzibit
- Aasim D'Xplicit

== See also ==
- List of record labels
- Loud Records discography
