= Mobb Deep =

American hip-hop duo

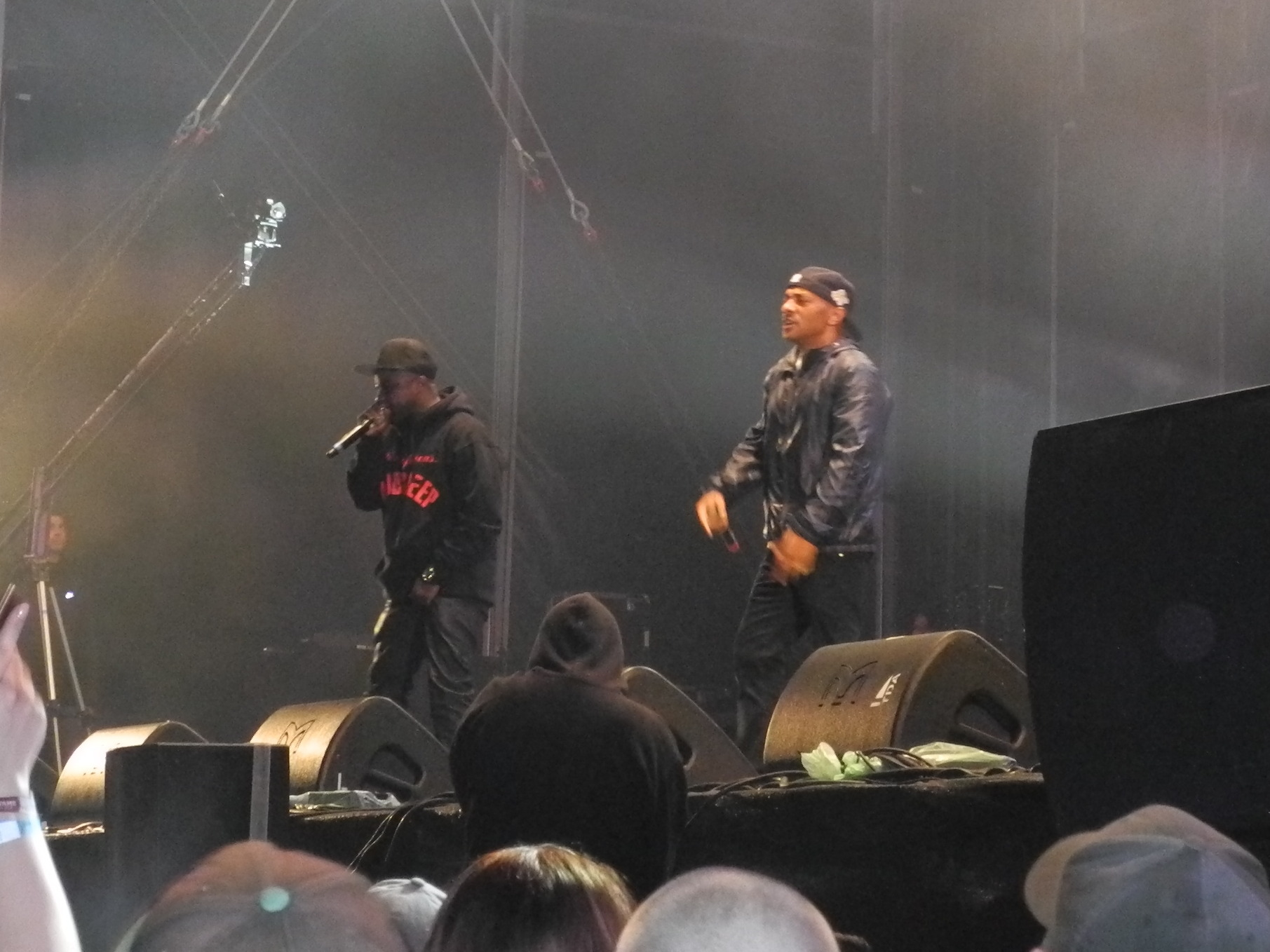
- Mobb Deep performing in 2015

Background information
- Also known as: Poetical Prophets
- Origin: Queens, New York City, U.S.
- Genres: East Coast hip-hop; hardcore hip-hop; gangsta rap
- Works: Mobb Deep discography
- Years active: 1990–2017
- Labels: 4th & B'way; Island; Loud; RCA (former); Columbia (former); Jive; G-Unit; Interscope; Violator; Infamous; BMG; Mass Appeal
- Past members: Havoc; Prodigy
- Website: mobbdeep.com

Mobb Deep were an American hip-hop duo formed in Queens, New York, in 1990. Consisting of rappers/songwriters/record producers Prodigy and Havoc, they are considered to be among the most influential artists in East Coast hip-hop. Mobb Deep are one of the most successful rap duos of all time, having sold over three million records. Their best-known albums are The Infamous (1995), Hell on Earth (1996) and Murda Muzik (1999), and their most successful singles were "Shook Ones, (Part II)" and "Survival of the Fittest". They were known for their dark and hardcore delivery.

The duo briefly disbanded in 2012, but reunited the next year. Prodigy died in June 2017.

== Biography ==
=== Early career ===
Havoc and Prodigy met while both were students at the High School of Art and Design in Manhattan—a school that produced creatives like Calvin Klein, Marc Jacobs, Amy Heckerling, Lee Quiñones, and Fab Five Freddy. In 1990, they became a duo that went by the name Poetical Prophets. The name Poetical Prophets was a testament to Prodigy, then Lord-T (The Golden Chyld), and Havoc's gravitation toward New York conscious hip-hop. The duo began making a demo tape and employed a guerilla marketing approach to promote themselves. They would find the addresses of record label headquarters on the back of albums, bring a cassette player, and ask passing artists to listen to their music. The only artist who stopped to hear their music was Q-Tip of A Tribe Called Quest; Prodigy recalled, "[Q-Tip] introduced us to Chris Lighty that day and a bunch of people in the Rush Associated Labels in the Def Jam office—that's how we met everybody." Shortly thereafter, Prodigy signed a solo demo deal with Jive Records and had an uncredited feature on the song "Too Young" by Hi-Five, which appeared on their eponymous debut album released in the fall of 1990. The song was included a few months later in the summer of 1991 on the Boyz n the Hood soundtrack. Jive decided not to sign Poetical Prophets as a duo.

However, they were featured in Matty C's July 1991 "Unsigned Hype" column in The Source, which helped promote their demo Flavor for the Nonbelieves. The Source dubbed Poetical Prophets a "dynamic duo ... that are fast making a big name for themselves in talent shows and radio stations in the New York area." The following year, the duo changed their name from Poetical Prophets to "Mobb Deep", in part based on the suggestion of Puff Daddy who was courting them to be the first artists on his newly created imprint, Bad Boy Records. In choosing the moniker, Prodigy noted that "we need[ed] something that described how we were living. When [we] got together to hang out, there would be thirty to forty of us, like a mob. The slang we used when we saw a whole bunch of guys together was . . . 'deep.' Both words together sounded good. Mobb Deep." The use of two Bs in the word Mobb was done to make the name look even.

In 1992, Mobb Deep signed with 4th & B'way Records. They released the single "Peer Pressure" in promotion of their debut album Juvenile Hell. The album was released in 1993 and featured production from DJ Premier, Large Professor, and Public Enemy-affiliate Kerwin Young. Later that year, Havoc made a guest appearance on the Black Moon album Enta da Stage, on a song titled "U da Man".

=== Rise to success ===
The group saw its first major success with their second album, The Infamous, released in 1995. Mobb Deep catapulted to the top of the hardcore hip-hop scene through Havoc and Prodigy's straightforward narration of street life. In this album, Mobb Deep portrayed the struggles of living in New York City's Queensbridge Houses where Havoc grew up. Following the release of The Infamous, Mobb Deep became some of the most prolific artists of the East Coast. The album title was inspired by a friend Yamit, a Golden Gloves boxer, who resided on Havoc's block in Queensbridge. Prodigy noted "[Yamit] had 'The Most Infamous' tattooed on his biceps in black ink. We were already Mobb Deep, but he dubbed us the Infamous Mobb Deep." The production of this album was very dark and sample-based thanks to Havoc, who produced the beats from this point forward, although Q-Tip also contributed to the production and mixing. Furthermore, the hit single "Shook Ones Part II", a remix to the hit "Shook Ones", received critical acclaim. In 2020, The Infamous was hailed by Rolling Stone as one of the 500 Greatest Albums of All Time.

Mobb Deep's third album, Hell on Earth was released in 1996, debuting at number six on the Billboard Album Chart; the album continued the duo's portrayal of harsh street life while further pushing them to the forefront of Hip Hop scene along with contemporary East Coast Rappers like The Notorious B.I.G., Jay-Z, LL Cool J, Wu-Tang Clan and fellow Queensbridge rapper Nas. Nas as well as Method Man, Ghostface Killah and Raekwon of Wu-Tang Clan appear on Hell on Earth.

In 1996, they appeared on the Red Hot Organization's compilation CD, America is Dying Slowly, alongside Biz Markie, Wu-Tang Clan and Fat Joe, among many other prominent hip-hop artists. This compilation was solely meant to raise awareness of the AIDS epidemic among African American men and was heralded as "a masterpiece" by The Source magazine. In 1997, Mobb Deep was featured on Frankie Cutlass Politics & Bullsh*t album track title, "Know Da Game", which also featured Kool G Rap. In 1998, the duo collaborated with reggae dancehall artist Bounty Killer on the track "Deadly Zone" for the soundtrack to Blade, and were a featured artist on the remix of Mariah Carey's single "The Roof (Back in Time)", which was based around a sample of "Shook Ones Part II". In 1999, they released the Murda Muzik album, which had the majority of its songs unintentionally leaked due to extensive bootlegging, causing delays as the group recorded new songs to replace the leaked ones. This resulted in delays in the official album release. When the album was officially released, it eventually debuted at number three on the Billboard 200 and quickly received Platinum certification and was further promoted by the popular single "Quiet Storm". Shortly afterward, Prodigy released his solo album H.N.I.C in which he collaborated with fellow artists like (B.G., N.O.R.E.) and producers (including The Alchemist, Rockwilder and Just Blaze).

=== East Coast vs West Coast feud ===
Mobb Deep was part of the infamous East Coast vs West Coast hip-hop rivalry that was fueled and increasingly promoted by the private media. The beef started when Snoop Dogg and the West Coast group, Tha Dogg Pound, released "New York, New York". Mobb Deep, along with Capone-N-Noreaga and Tragedy Khadafi, responded with the song "L.A L.A" (This song can be found on Capone-N-Noreaga's debut album The War Report). "L.A. L.A". was released during rapper Tupac Shakur's final days of incarceration. Members of Tupac's group, Outlawz, allegedly attended a Mobb Deep concert; they then visited with Tupac over public rumoring that the duo had snubbed them at the concert. Tupac dissed Mobb Deep on multiple tracks, including: "Hit 'Em Up" and "When We Ride on Our Enemies" in which Tupac makes light of Prodigy's sickle-cell disease. Additional Tupac diss tracks include: "Bomb First (My Second Reply)" where Tupac said "You're barely breathin'" and "Against All Odds", both of which were released on Tupac's posthumous studio album, The Don Killuminati: The 7 Day Theory. Mobb Deep retaliated on their 1996 release of Hell on Earth, which contains a diss track entitled "Drop a Gem on 'Em".

"I was happy about it," Havoc told Jack Thriller. "The nigga saying our names. I didn't know what the fuck the beef was about. I didn't even care. I was like damn, did you hear that? 2Pac dissing us. We about to sell some records." Havoc also revealed that Mobb Deep had never even "crossed paths" with Shakur before his death in September 1996. He added, "And we never got a chance to cross paths with him because he passed away," he said. "I saw him from a long distance but I never met him. [I was a] Fan, but didn't even know him."

=== 2000–2010 ===
Mobb Deep released Infamy while in 2001 the song "Burn" (featuring Vita) was perceived as a response to Jay-Z's diss song "Takeover" on The Blueprint, as was "Crawlin'", in which Prodigy's two verses both mention Jay-Z. The album marked a major stylistic change in which the duo moved away from a raw, minimalist, stripped-down beat toward a commercial friendly in terms with such songs as "Hey Luv (Anything)". This transition fostered accusations of "selling out". In 2003, the group split with Loud Records and released Free Agents: The Murda Mixtape, in which Havoc and Prodigy proclaimed themselves "free agents" and addressed the group's split with its old label and its search for a new label. Jive Records signed the duo later in the year through a deal with the group's own imprint. Mobb Deep then released Amerikaz Nightmare in 2004. The record sold poorly and led to the group's departure from the label. Today, as a result of various mergers, all of Mobb Deep's studio albums from 1995 to 2004 are owned by Sony Music Entertainment.

==== G-Unit Records ====
In June 2005, Mobb Deep announced they had signed with G-Unit Records. Fellow Queens-bred rapper 50 Cent had a personal connection to Mobb Deep, and Havoc provided production on tracks by G-Unit, Lloyd Banks, The Game, and Tony Yayo. Mobb Deep released their seventh album, Blood Money in 2006. It features G-Unit members 50 Cent, Lloyd Banks, Tony Yayo, and Young Buck, as well as Mary J. Blige and Nate Dogg. In 2006, Mobb Deep became the first American hip-hop duo to perform in India, via VH1's Hip Hop Hustle. In late 2009, Mobb Deep were released from their contract with G Unit.

=== 2011–2017: Break-up, reunion, The Infamous Mobb Deep and death of Prodigy ===
On April 4, 2011, Mobb Deep released a new single called "Dog Shit", featuring rapper Nas. This was the first official song by Mobb Deep since Prodigy's release from jail. It was produced by Havoc and the Alchemist.

On July 27, 2012, Havoc told AllHipHop in an interview that the group was on an indefinite hiatus. According to HipHopDX, Mobb Deep had a falling out after Havoc blasted Prodigy on Twitter, and eventually, a sound clip leaked of him taking numerous shots at his former Mobb Deep partner during their concert at SXSW. At first, Havoc claimed that he was hacked. However, he later confirmed it was him and that he had originally denied it because he felt that Twitter was not a place to resolve a beef. He also stated that he had a diss track aimed at Prodigy in the making, "Same Shit Different Day". The song later turned out to be "Separated (Real from the Fake)", which appeared on Havoc's solo album 13.

However, in January 2013 Prodigy said that he was sure he would record with Havoc in the future. Mobb Deep appeared on Papoose's debut album The Nacirema Dream on the track "Aim, Shoot". They later reunited and performed for Paid Dues on March 30, 2013; they went on an international 20th-anniversary tour starting in May 2013. On March 22, 2013, the group officially reunited for an interview and explained that music was the most important thing in their lives and that they had been friends for too long to break up the friendship.

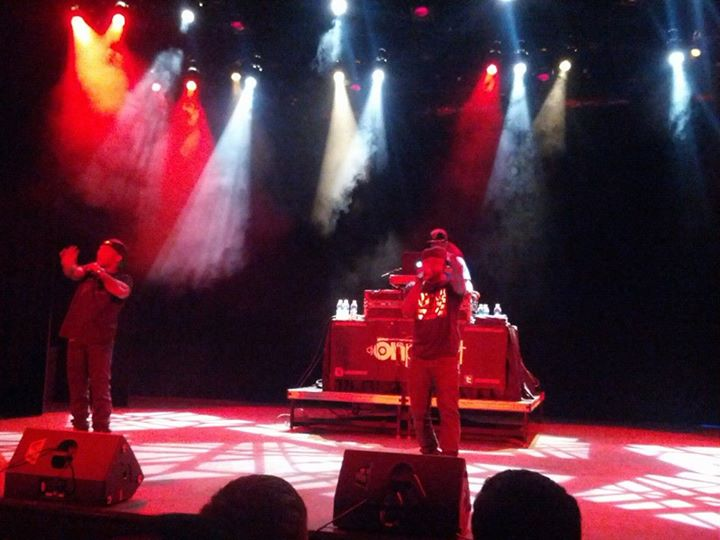
Mobb Deep in 2013

Around the May 2013 release of Havoc's third studio album, 13, Havoc announced that he and Prodigy had been in the studio for over a month working on the duo's eighth studio album which was already "halfway done". He also stated that he will be doing the entire production on the album.

On April 1, 2014, the group released its eighth studio album, The Infamous Mobb Deep, a double album that included one CD with original new music and one with unreleased tracks from sessions from The Infamous.

On June 20, 2017, Prodigy died from accidental choking in Las Vegas, Nevada, while hospitalized for complications caused by sickle cell anemia.

=== 2025: Infinite ===
On February 12, 2025, the Alchemist confirmed that he and Havoc were working on a new album called Infinite, and that Nas was also involved in the project. The album was released on October 10, 2025, and featured guest appearances from Clipse, Big Noyd, Raekwon, Ghostface Killah, Nas, Jorja Smith, and H.E.R..

== Legacy ==
Mobb Deep helped popularize the 1990s slang called the "Dunn language", a term first recorded in the 1999 single "Quiet Storm", in which Prodigy raps: "you's a dick blower, [you] tryin' to speak the Dunn Language?/ 'what's the drilly' with that though? 'It aint bangin'/ you hooked on Mobb phonics, Infamous 'bonics."

The term "dunn" supposedly originated in the Queensbridge housing projects with an acquaintance of Prodigy's, Bumpy, whose speech impediment prevented him from pronouncing the letter "S", such as in "son". The impediment encouraged him to put the tongue on the two front teeth/palate, making a 'th' or a 'd' sound. Mobb Deep has attempted to claim ownership of this body of slang; additionally, they were going to release an album called The Dunn Language, in 2002, but the project was shelved, due to label issues.

Mobb Deep appear as themselves as playable characters in the video game Def Jam: Fight for NY, released in 2004.

On September 15, 2018, during an interview for HipHop4Real, Havoc stated that he was working on a new album Mobb Deep, which would be the duo's final album. He is also working on a joint project Mobb Deep with The Alchemist, announced a few years ago.

In December 2019, Havoc went on a "Murda Muzik 20th Anniversary Tour" with Big Noyd and L.E.S.

== Discography ==
Studio albums

- Juvenile Hell (1993)
- The Infamous (1995)
- Hell on Earth (1996)
- Murda Muzik (1999)
- Infamy (2001)
- Amerikaz Nightmare (2004)
- Blood Money (2006)
- The Infamous Mobb Deep (2014)
- Infinite (2025)
