= Havoc production discography =

The following is a discography of production credited to Mobb Deep member and producer Havoc.

== Singles produced ==
List of singles, with selected chart positions, showing year released and album name
Title	Year	Peak chart positions			Certifications	Album
Title	Year	US	US R&B	UK	Certifications	Album
"Shook Ones (Part II)" (Mobb Deep)	1995	59	52	—	BPI: Silver	The Infamous
"Survival of the Fittest" (Mobb Deep)	1995	69	60	—		The Infamous
"Back at You" (Mobb Deep)	1996	—	—	—		Sunset Park soundtrack
"Illegal Life" (Capone-N-Noreaga featuring Tragedy Khadafi and Havoc)	1996	—	84	—		The War Report
"Front Lines (Hell on Earth)" (Mobb Deep)	1996	109	57	—		Hell on Earth
"It's the Pee" (PMD featuring Mobb Deep)	1997	—	82	—		Business Is Business
"G.O.D. Pt. III" (Mobb Deep)	1997	101	64	—		Hell on Earth
"Hoodlum" (Mobb Deep featuring Big Noyd and Rakim)	1997	—	—	—		Hoodlum soundtrack
"Quiet Storm" (Mobb Deep)	1999	106	35	—		Murda Muzik
"It's Mine" (Mobb Deep featuring Nas)	1999	—	71	—		Murda Muzik
"U.S.A. (Aiight Then)" (Mobb Deep)	2000	—	95	—		Murda Muzik
"Burn" (Mobb Deep featuring Big Noyd and Vita)	2001	99	56	—		Infamy
"Hey Luv (Anything)" (Mobb Deep featuring 112)	2002	58	32	—		Infamy
"Pray for Me" (Mobb Deep featuring Lil Mo)	2002	—	—	—		Infamy
"Gangstaz Roll" (Mobb Deep)	2003	—	98	127		—N/a
"Why" (Jadakiss featuring Anthony Hamilton)	2004	11	4	—		Kiss of Death
"Put Em in Their Place" (Mobb Deep)	2006	—	59	75		Blood Money
"Creep" (Mobb Deep featuring 50 Cent)	2006	—	59	—		Blood Money
"Tell Me to My Face" (Havoc featuring Royce da 5'9")	2013	—	—	—		13
"Gone" (Havoc)	2013	—	—	—		13
"Life We Chose" (Havoc featuring Lloyd Banks)	2013	—	—	—		13
"Taking You Off Here" (Mobb Deep)	2014	—	—	—		The Infamous Mobb Deep
"Mobbing" (Papoose featuring Troy Ave)	2015	—	—	—		You Can't Stop Destiny
"Real Friends" (Kanye West)	2016	92	34	78	RIAA: Platinum; BPI: Silver	The Life of Pablo
"Famous" (Kanye West)	2016	34	13	33	RIAA: 2× Platinum; ARIA: Gold; MC: Platinum; IFPI DEN: Gold; FIMI: Gold; BPI: Gold	The Life of Pablo
"—" denotes a recording that did not chart or was not released in that territory.

== 1993 ==
=== Mobb Deep – Juvenile Hell ===
- 01. "Intro"
- 05. "Skit #1"
- 06. "Hold Down the Fort"
- 09. "Skit #2"
- 11. "Skit #3"

== 1994 ==
=== Mobb Deep – Shook Ones 12" ===
- A1. "Shook Ones"

== 1995 ==
=== Mobb Deep – The Infamous ===
(All tracks credited to Mobb Deep, except where noted)

- 01. "The Start of Your Ending (41st Side)"
- 03. "Survival of the Fittest"
- 04. "Eye for a Eye (Your Beef Is Mines)" [featuring Nas and Raekwon]
- 07. "Temperature's Rising" (featuring Crystal Johnson) _{(produced by Q-Tip, co-produced by Mobb Deep)}
- 08. "Up North Trip"
- 09. "Trife Life"
- 10. "Q.U.- Hectic"
- 11. "Right Back at You" (featuring Ghostface Killah, Raekwon and Big Noyd) _{(Produced with Schott Free)}
- 13. "Cradle to the Grave"
- 14. "Drink Away the Pain (Situations)" [featuring Q-Tip] _{(produced by Q-Tip, co-produced by Mobb Deep)}
- 15. "Shook Ones Pt. II"
- 16. "Party Over" (featuring Big Noyd) _{(Produced with Matt Life)}

=== Mobb Deep – Survival of the Fittest 12" ===
- A2. "Survival of the Fittest (Remix)" [featuring Crystal Johnson]

== 1996 ==
=== Various artists – Sunset Park (soundtrack) ===
- 04. "Back at You" - Mobb Deep

=== Big Noyd – Episodes of a Hustla ===
- 03. "Recognize & Realize (Part 1)" (featuring Prodigy)
- 04. "All Pro" (featuring Prodigy & Infamous Mobb)
- 05. "Infamous Mobb" (featuring Prodigy)
- 07. "Usual Suspect" (featuring Prodigy)
- 08. "Episodes of a Hustla" (featuring Prodigy)
- 09. "Recognize & Realize (Part 2)" (featuring Mobb Deep)
- 10. "I Don't Wanna Love Again" (After Six Entertainment Remix)

=== Nas – It Was Written ===
- 09. "The Set Up" (featuring Havoc)
- 13. "Live Nigga Rap" (featuring Mobb Deep)

=== Various artists – NFL Jams ===
- 11. "No Doubt" – Havoc and Tyrone Wheatley

=== Mobb Deep – Hell on Earth ===
- 01. "Animal Instinct" (featuring Twin Gambino & Ty Nitty)
- 02. "Drop a Gem on 'Em"
- 03. "Bloodsport"
- 04. "Extortion" (featuring Method Man)
- 05. "More Trife Life"
- 06. "Man Down" (featuring Big Noyd)
- 07. "Can't Get Enough of It" (featuring Illa Ghee)
- 08. "Nighttime Vultures" (featuring Raekwon)
- 09. "G.O.D. Pt. III"
- 10. "Get Dealt With"
- 11. "Front Lines (Hell on Earth)"
- 12. "Give It Up Fast" (featuring Big Noyd & Nas)
- 13. "Still Shinin'"
- 14. "Apostle's Warning"
- 15. "In the Long Run" (featuring Ty Nitty & Money No) {Bonus Track}

=== Foxy Brown – Ill Na Na ===
- 05. "The Promise" (feat. Havoc)

=== The Almighty RSO – Doomsday: Forever RSO / Original Gangstas (soundtrack) ===
- 03. "The War's On" (feat. Mobb Deep)

=== Xzibit - Eyes May Shine 12" ===
- B3. "Eyes May Shine (Remix)" [feat. Mobb Deep]

=== Shaquille O'Neal – You Can't Stop the Reign ===
- 08. "Legal Money" (feat. Mobb Deep)

== 1997 ==
=== The Notorious B.I.G. – Life After Death ===
- 06. "Last Day" (featuring The LOX) _{(Produced with Stevie J and Puff Daddy)}

=== PMD - It's the Pee '97 12" ===
- A1. "It's the Pee '97" (feat. Mobb Deep)

=== Mobb Deep - G.O.D. PT. III 12" ===
- A2. "The After Hours G.O.D. PT. III"

=== Various Artists - How to Be a Player (soundtrack) ===
- C4. "Adidas" - Made Men, Havoc & Man Terror {Vinyl Only Track}

=== Various artists – Steel (soundtrack) ===
- 01. "Mobb of Steel" - Mobb Deep

=== Various artists – Hoodlum (soundtrack) ===
- 01. "Hoodlum" - Mobb Deep, Big Noyd & Rakim

=== Mic Geronimo – Vendetta ===
- 03. "Survival"

=== Capone-N-Noreaga – The War Report ===
- 17. "Illegal Life" (feat. Tragedy Khadafi & Havoc) _{{drum programming}}

=== Various artists – Soul in the Hole (soundtrack) ===
- 08. "Rare Species (Modus Operandi)" - Mobb Deep

=== Consequence – Niggaz Get the Money EP ===
- A2. "Queens Get the Money" (feat. Havoc)

== 1998 ==
=== Various artists – Slam: The Soundtrack ===
- 12. "Feel My Gat Blow" – Mobb Deep

=== Method Man – Tical 2000: Judgement Day ===
- 19. "Play IV Keeps" (featuring Inspectah Deck, Mobb Deep, Streetlife and Hell Razah)

=== La the Darkman – Heist of the Century ===
- 03. "City Lights"
- 12. "Figaro Chain" (feat. Havoc)

== 1999 ==
=== Mobb Deep – Murda Muzik ===
- 02. "Streets Raised Me" (featuring Big Noyd and Chinky)
- 03. "What's Ya Poison" (featuring Cormega)
- 04. "Spread Love"
- 05. "Let a Ho Be a Ho"
- 06. "I'm Going Out" (featuring Lil' Cease)
- 07. "Allustrious"
- 08. "Adrenaline"
- 10. "Quiet Storm"
- 11. "Where Ya Heart At"
- 13. "Can't Fuck Wit" (featuring Raekwon)
- 15. "Murda Muzik"
- 18. "It's Mine" (featuring Nas)
- 19. "Quiet Storm (Remix)" [featuring Lil' Kim]

=== Charli Baltimore – Cold as Ice ===
- 13. "Infamous" (feat. Mobb Deep & Mike Delorian)

=== Various Artists - The Corruptor (soundtrack) ===
- 06. "Allustrious" - Mobb Deep

=== Various artists – Violator: The Album ===
- 10. "Nobody Likes Me" – Mobb Deep
- 13. "Shit That He Said" – Big Noyd

=== Originoo Gunn Clappaz – The M-Pire Shrikez Back ===
- 14. "Suspect Niggaz" (feat. Buckshot and Havoc)

=== Nas – Nastradamus ===
- 07. "Shoot 'Em Up"

=== Coko – Triflin' 12" ===
- A2. "Triflin' (Mobb Deep Remix)" [feat. Havoc]

== 2000 ==
=== LL Cool J – G.O.A.T. ===
- 15. "Queens Is" (featuring Prodigy)

=== Prodigy – H.N.I.C. ===
- 09. "Wanna Be Thugs" (featuring Havoc)
- 11. "Delt with the Bullshit" (featuring Havoc)

=== Capone-N-Noreaga – The Reunion ===
- 14. "Gunz in tha Air"
- 17. "Queens’ Finest" (feat. Mobb Deep & Final Chapter)

=== Various artists – Nas & Ill Will Records Presents QB's Finest ===
- 03. "We Live This" – Big Noyd, Havoc, Roxanne Shanté
- 10. "Power Rap" (Freestyle Interlude) – Prodigy

=== Various artists – Any Given Sunday (soundtrack) ===
- 03. "Never Goin' Back" – Mobb Deep

== 2001 ==
=== Cuban Link - 24K (unreleased) ===
- 12. "Toe to Toe" (featuring Big Pun)

=== Cormega – The Realness ===
- 03. "Thun & Kicko" (featuring Prodigy)
- 15. "Killaz Theme II" (featuring Mobb Deep)

=== Faith Evans – Faithfully ===
- 15. "Heaven Only Knows" _{(Co-produced by Winans and Diddy)}

=== Various artists – Hardball (soundtrack) ===
- 10. "Play" – Mobb Deep

=== Mobb Deep – Infamy ===
- 01. "Pray for Me" (featuring Lil' Mo)
- 03. "Bounce"
- 04. "Clap"
- 05. "Kill That Nigga"
- 06. "My Gats Spitting" (featuring Infamous Mobb)
- 07. "Handcuffs"
- 08. "Hey Luv (Anything)" (featuring 112)
- 09. "The Learning (Burn)" [featuring Noyd and Vita]
- 11. "Hurt Niggas" (featuring Noyd)
- 14. "Crawlin'"
- 15. "Nothing Like Home" (featuring Littles)

=== Various artists – Violator: The Album, V2.0 ===
- 11. "U Feel Me/Options" – Havoc, Fat Joe, Remy Ma/Capone, Big Noyd

=== Various artists – Lake Entertainment Presents: The 41st Side ===
- 02. "Cardboard Box" – Havoc, Nature, Littles, The Jackal

== 2002 ==
=== Onyx – Bacdafucup Part II ===
- 04. "Hold Up" (feat. X1 and Havoc)

=== Infamous Mobb – Special Edition ===
- 11. "We Don't Give A..." (featuring Havoc)
- 16. "War/Get High Get Bent"

== 2003 ==
=== DJ Kay Slay – The Streetsweeper, Vol. 1 ===
- 05. "Get Shot the Fuck Up" (feat. Mobb Deep and Big Noyd)

=== Lil' Kim – La Bella Mafia ===
- 02. "Hold It Now" (featuring Havoc)

=== Big Noyd – Only the Strong ===
- 02. "Watch Out"
- 05. "We Gangsta"
- 07. "All 4 the Luv of the Dough" (feat. Prodigy)
- 08. "Invincible" (feat. Chinky

=== The Alchemist – The Cutting Room Floor (1st Infantry Mixtape 1) ===
- 04. "Walk With Me"
- 08. "First to Drop a Beat the Boldest"

=== Mobb Deep – Gangstaz Roll 12" ===
- A1. "Gangstaz Roll"
- B1. "Clap Those Thangs" (feat. 50 Cent)

== 2004 ==
=== Jadakiss – Kiss of Death ===
- 06. "Why?" (featuring Anthony Hamilton)

=== Lloyd Banks – The Hunger for More ===
- 01. "Ain't No Click" (featuring Tony Yayo)

=== Mobb Deep – Amerikaz Nightmare ===
- 01. "Amerikaz Nightmare"
- 03. "Flood the Block"
- 04. "Dump" (featuring Nate Dogg)
- 08. "Shorty Wop"
- 10. "One of Ours Part II" (featuring Jadakiss)
- 11. "On the Run"
- 13. "Get Me" (featuring Littles and Noyd)
- 14. "We Up"
- 15. "Neva Change"

=== Various Artist - Barbershop 2: Back in Business (soundtrack) ===
- 11. "One of Ours" - Mobb Deep

=== Big Noyd – On the Grind ===
- 03. "Most Famous"
- 09. "Kill Dat There"
- 11. "Off the Wall"
- 12. "Ain't Too Much"
- 15. "Infinite Team"
- 16. "Money Rolls"

=== Hit Squad – Zero Tolerance ===
- 17. "It's the Pee Back 2 Work" (Remix) – PMD, Mobb Deep and Fat Joe

== 2005 ==
=== The Game – The Documentary ===
- 07. "Don't Need Your Love" (featuring Faith Evans) _{(produced with Dr. Dre)}

=== Various artists – Get Rich or Die Tryin' (soundtrack) ===
- 12. "Born Alone, Die Alone" - Lloyd Banks

=== The Notorious B.I.G. – Duets: The Final Chapter ===
- 12. "Beef" (featuring Mobb Deep)

=== Tragedy Khadafi – Thug Matrix ===
- 02. "The Game" (feat. Havoc)

=== Tony Yayo – Thoughts of a Predicate Felon ===
- 16. "Dear Suzie"

=== Sheek Louch – After Taxes ===
- 05. "45 Minutes to Broadway"

=== Cormega – The Testament (original release date: 1998) ===
- 12. "Killaz Theme" (feat. Mobb Deep)

=== Rohff – Au-Delà De Mes Limites ===
- 05. "Avec Ou Sans"

=== Makeba Mooncycle – Balance ===
- 01. "Big East Main Event Freestyle"

=== DJ Mello & The Alchemist – Chemical Files ===
- 12. "D Block to QB"

=== Big Twins – The Grimey One Vol. 1 ===
- 07. "Get It Right" (featuring Mobb Deep)

== 2006 ==
=== Diddy – Press Play ===
- 04. "The Future"
- 05. "Hold Up" (featuring Angela Hunte) _{{co-produced by SC}}

=== Lloyd Banks – Rotten Apple ===
- 01. "Rotten Apple" (featuring 50 Cent & Prodigy) _{(Co-produced by Sha Money XL)}

=== Mobb Deep – Blood Money ===
- 01. "Smoke It"
- 02. "Put Em in Their Place" _{(Co-produced by Ky Miller and Sha Money XL)}
- 03. "Stole Something" (featuring Lloyd Banks)
- 04. "Creep" (featuring 50 Cent)
- 05. "Speaking So Freely"
- 08. "Click Click" (featuring Tony Yayo)
- 14. "It's Alright" (featuring Mary J. Blige and 50 Cent)

=== Mobb Deep – Life of the Infamous: The Best of Mobb Deep ===
- 16. "Blood Money" (previously unreleased)
- 17. "Go Head" (previously unreleased)

=== Big Noyd – The Stick Up Kid ===
- 01. "Infamous Team"
- 04. "Money Roll"

=== Method Man – 4:21... The Day After ===
- 04. "Somebody Done Fucked Up"

=== Styles P – Time Is Money ===
- 03. "How We Live" (featuring Jadakiss)

=== Tragedy Khadafi – Thug Matrix 2 ===
- 01. "What's Poppin'"

=== Bars N Hooks – The Most Notorious ===
- 04. "World Premiere" (featuring Mobb Deep)

== 2007 ==
=== 50 Cent – Curtis ===
- 12. "Fully Loaded Clip"
- 16. "Curtis 187"

=== Tragedy Khadafi – The Death of Tragedy ===
- 01. "G-Formation"

=== Infamous Mobb – Reality Rap ===
- 06. "Blauu!"

=== Mobb Deep – The Infamous Archives ===
Disc two

- 01. "Cobra"

=== Havoc – The Kush ===
- 01. "NY 4 Life"
- 02. "I'm the Boss"
- 03. "By My Side" (feat. 40 Glocc)
- 04. "One Less Nigga"
- 05. "Ride Out" (feat. Nyce da Future)
- 06. "Balling Out" ( feat. Un Pacino)
- 07. "What's Poppin' Tonite"
- 08. "Class By Myself" (feat. Nitti)
- 09. "Set Me Free" (feat. Prodigy & Nyce da Future)
- 10. "Be There"
- 11. "Hit Me Up" (feat. Un Pacino)
- 12. "Get Off My Dick"

=== Killa Sha – God Walk on Water ===
- 08. "Work the Plan" (feat. Havoc)

=== Illa Ghee – Bullet & a Bracelet ===
- 14. "Pick His Face Up"

=== Los Angeles Finest – Los Angeles Finest E.P. ===
- B3. "The West"

== 2008 ==
=== Prodigy – H.N.I.C. Pt. 2 ===
- 09. "Field Marshal P" (featuring Un Pacino)
- 13. "I Want Out" (featuring Havoc & Un Pacino)
- 16. "Get Trapped" (featuring Nyce & Un Pacino) [Bonus track]

=== Termanology – Politics as Usual ===
- 13. "The Chosen (Resurrecting The Game)"

=== Big Twins – The Grimey Collection ===
- 13. "Sold My Soul" (feat. Prodigy)

== 2009 ==
=== 50 Cent – Before I Self Destruct ===
- 11. "Gangsta's Delight"

=== Method Man & Redman – Blackout! 2 ===
- 02. "I'm Dope Nigga"

=== KRS-One & Buckshot – Survival Skills ===
- 02. "Robot"

=== Havoc – Hidden Files ===
- 01. "Can't Get Touched"
- 02. "I Clap 'Em Up"
- 03. "Watch Me" (featuring Ricky Blaze)
- 04. "Heart of the Grind"
- 05. "You Treated Me" (featuring Cassidy)
- 06. "My Life"
- 07. "That's My Word"
- 08. "The Hustler"
- 09. "The Millennium"
- 10. "Walk Wit Me"
- 11. "On a Mission" (featuring Prodigy)
- 12. "This Is Where It's At" (featuring Big Noyd)
- 13. "Don't Knock It 'Til You Try It"
- 14. "Tell Me More" (featuring Sonyae Elise)

=== Capone-N-Noreaga – Channel 10 ===
- 09. "Wobble" (featuring Mobb Deep)

=== R.A. the Rugged Man – Legendary Classics Volume 1 ===
- 06. "Who's Dat Guy" (featuring Havoc)

=== Mobb Deep – The Safe Is Cracked ===
- 01. "Mobb Deep"
- 02. "Heat"
- 03. "Watch Ya Self"
- 04. "M.O.B."
- 05. "Can't Win 4 Losin'"
- 06. "Yea, Yea, Yea"
- 07. "That Crack"
- 08. "Infamous"
- 10. "Position"
- 11. "Get Out Our Way"
- 12. "You Wanna See Me Fall"
- 13. "Don't Play"
- 14. "Mobb Deep II"

=== Cormega – Born and Raised ===
- 03. "Love Your Family" (feat. Havoc)

=== Big Twins – The Project Kid ===
- 10. "The Project Kid"
- 16. "Number One" (feat. Prodigy)

=== Buckshot – Smirnoff Signature Mix Series 12" ===
- A2. "I Got Cha Opin '09" (feat. Kardinal Offishall)

== 2010 ==
=== Eminem – Recovery ===
- 17. "Untitled" _{(produced with Magnedo7)}

=== Hell Razah – Heaven Razah ===
- 15. "Armageddon"

== 2011 ==
=== Bad Meets Evil – Hell: The Sequel ===
- 01. "Welcome 2 Hell" _{(produced with Magnedo7)}

=== Raekwon – Shaolin vs. Wu-Tang ===
- 19. "Your World & My World" (featuring Havoc)

=== Travis Barker – Let the Drummer Get Wicked ===
- 04. "Detroit" (feat. Royce da 5'9") _{(produced with Travis Barker)}

=== Mobb Deep – Black Cocaine ===
- 03. "Conquer"

=== Termanology – Cameo King II ===
- 12. "You Take Her" (feat. Freeway and Havoc)

== 2012 ==
=== 50 Cent – 5 (Murder by Numbers) ===
- 07. "Money"
- 08. "Definition of Sexy" (featuring Guordan)

=== Vinnie Paz – God of the Serengeti ===
- 11. "Geometry of Business" (feat. La Coka Nostra)

=== 40 Glocc – New World Agenda ===
- 20. "Bullet With Your Name on It"

== 2013 ==
=== Mack Wilds – New York: A Love Story ===
- 03. "Henny" (produced with Salaam Remi)
- 12. "Remember the Time" (produced with Salaam Remi)

=== Havoc – 13 ===
- 01. "Gone"
- 02. "Favorite Rap Stars" (featuring Styles P & Raekwon)
- 03. "Life We Chose" (featuring Lloyd Banks) _{{co-produced by FMG}}
- 04. "Colder Days" (featuring Masspike Miles) _{{co-produced by FMG}}
- 05. "Get Busy"
- 06. "Eyes Open" (featuring Twista)
- 07. "Tell Me to My Face" (featuring Royce da 5'9") _{{co-produced by FMG}}
- 09. "Already Tomorrow"
- 10. "Hear Dat"
- 11. "Gettin' Mines" (produced with Andrew Lloyd and Team Green Productions)
- 12. "Long Road" (Outro)

=== Alley Boy – War Cry ===
- 18. "Gotta Get It"

=== DJ Duke – Winterz Hell ===
- 19. "Tell Me to My Face" (feat. Royce Da 5'9")

== 2014 ==
=== G-Unit – The Beauty of Independence ===
- 01. "Watch Me"

=== Havoc – 13 Reloaded ===
- 01. "Best of the Best"
- 02. "Not Yours"
- 03. "Uncut Raw" (performed by Mobb Deep)
- 04. "Don't Take It Personal"
- 05. "What I Rep" (featuring Sheek Louch)
- 06. "Dirty Calls"
- 07. "What's Your Problem"
- 08. "Listen to the Man"
- 09. "Fallen Soldiers" (featuring Cormega)
- 10. "Get Your Shit"
- 11. "Outro (Top Seller)" (featuring Ferg Brim)
- 12. "Tear Shit Up" (featuring Mysonne)
- 13. "Champion Winner"
- 14. "All I Know"

=== Mobb Deep – The Infamous Mobb Deep ===
- 01. "Taking You Off Here"
- 03. "Get Down"
- 07. "Low" (featuring Mack Wilds) _{{co-produced by Boi-1da & Sevn Thomas}}
- 10. "Gimme All That"
- 11. "Legendary" (featuring Bun B and Juicy J) _{{co-produced by Boi-1da}}

=== Papoose – Cigar Society ===
- 02. "John F Kennedy" (featuring Cassidy)

== 2015 ==
=== Papoose – You Can't Stop Destiny ===
- 03. "Mobbing" (featuring Troy Ave)

=== Bugsy da God – Camouflage Disciple ===
- 10. "House of Horrors" (feat. Big Noyd and Dom Pachino)

=== Wax Wonder ===
- 00. "Mind Your Own" (feat. KXNG Crooked)

== 2016 ==
=== Kanye West – The Life of Pablo ===
- 04. "Famous" (feat. Rihanna) _{(produced with Kanye West, Noah Goldstein, Charlie Heat, Andrew Dawson, Hudson Mohawke, Mike Dean, and Plain Pat)}
- 12. "Real Friends" (featuring Ty Dolla Sign) (_{produced with Kanye West, Boi-1da, Frank Dukes, Darren King, Mike Dean, and Noah Goldstein)}

=== Cormega ===
- 01. "Ironic" (feat. Havoc & Giggs)

== 2019 ==
=== Streetlife & Method Man ===
- 01. "Squad Up" (feat. Havoc)

=== Illa Ghee – The Whole Half of It ===
- 03. "Pull Up"

== 2020 ==
=== Conway the Machine – From King to a God ===
- 05. "Juvenile Hell" (feat. Flee Lord, Havoc & Lloyd Banks)

=== Havoc and Flee Lord – In the Name of Prodigy ===
- 01. "In the Name of P Intro"
- 02. "Torch Carriers" (feat. Ransom)
- 03. "Infamous Bop" (feat. Big Twins)
- 04. "Major Distribution" (feat. Busta Rhymes)
- 05. "All for the Goat" (feat. Conway the Machine)
- 06. "1 A.M. Music"
- 07. "Wu-Lords" (feat. Raekwon)
- 08. "Raise the Bar" (feat. Santana Fox)
- 09. "Mac in the Engine" (feat. Eto & Billy V)
- 10. "Bound to Take Losses" (feat. Havoc)

== 2021 ==
=== Havoc & Nyce da Future – Future of the Streets ===
- 01. "I Can't Believe It"
- 02. "Everything I Love"
- 03. "Boss of the Bosses" (feat. Havoc)
- 04. "Graphic"
- 05. "Savage"
- 06. "Say Yes"
- 07. "Active"
- 08. "Infamous"

=== Havoc & Dark Lo – Extreme Measures ===
- 01. "Mob Tales" (feat. Havoc)
- 02. "Lost Innocence"
- 03. "Zombie Land" (feat. Havoc)
- 04. "Extreme Measures" (feat. Styles P)
- 05. "Greatest Ever"
- 06. "Reports"
- 07. "Make It Home" (feat. Vado)
- 08. "Force of Life"
- 09. "Dirty Work"
- 10. "Captivating"
- 11. "Strong Minded"

=== Havoc & Nyce da Future – Future of the Streets (Deluxe Edition) ===
- 01. "I Can't Believe It"
- 02. "Everything I Love"
- 03. "Boss of the Bosses" (feat. Havoc)
- 04. "Graphic"
- 05. "Savage"
- 06. "Say Yes"
- 07. "Active"
- 08. "Infamous"
- 09. "Don P"
- 10. "Murda Rap"
- 11. "Keep the Same Energy" (feat. Havoc)
- 12. "By Any Means" (feat. Eto)
- 13. "Take It to the Top" (feat. Havoc)
- 14. "The Real Is Back" (feat. Robegod)

=== Havoc & Styles P – Wreckage Manner ===
- 01. "Fuck Around"
- 02. "Move How We Wanna"
- 03. "Fiend For"
- 04. "Pay Me in Cash"
- 05. "21 Gun Salute"
- 06. "YO 2 QB"
- 07. "Havoc and the Ghost"
- 08. "Good as Gold"
- 09. "Hymn to Him"
- 10. "Nightmares 2 Dreams"

== 2022 ==
=== Marlon Craft - While We're Here ===
- 04. "Hans Zimmer" {produced with Sly5thAve}

=== Daz Dillinger & Capone - Guidelinez ===
- 08. "We Ready" (feat. Havoc)
- 09. "Extendo" (feat. Conway the Machine)

=== Cormega - The Realness II ===
- 09. "Essential"

== 2023 ==
=== Fuego Base & Black Soprano Family - Biggest Since Camby ===
- 13. "White Lives Matter" (feat. Sule)

=== Russ - Chomp 2.5 ===
- 03. "Buckle Up Freestyle" _{{co-produced by SC}}

=== Jabee - Enough ===
- 01. "Passion & Dedication"
- 02. "Key of Life" (feat. Murs & YaH Ra)
- 03. "Angels" (Mistah F.A.B)
- 04. "Thoughts & Condolences" (feat. Wavy Baby)
- 05. "Blessings" (feat. Che Noir & John Givez)

=== 2 Chainz & Lil Wayne - Welcome 2 Collegrove ===
- 14. "Shame"
- 15. "Bars" _{{co-produced by Mike Dean}}

== 2024 ==
=== ¥$ - Vultures Pack ===
- 01. "Vultures - Havoc Version"

=== ¥$ - Vultures 2 ===
- 09. "Forever Rolling" (featuring Lil Baby)
- 17. "Can U Be" (featuring Travis Scott) (Digital Deluxe)

=== Ras Kass, RJ Payne & Havoc - GUTTR ===
- 01. "Roll Call" (featuring Method Man, Lil' Fame & Sway Calloway)
- 02. "Nostalgia"
- 03. "Everything is GUTTR" (feat. Kurupt & KXNG Crooked)
- 05. "Once Again It's On" (feat. Twista)
- 06. "Different"
- 08. "Lo-Fi"
- 09. "Stop Playin"
- 11. "Old Soul"

== 2025 ==
=== Mobb Deep - Infinite ===
- 01. "Against the World"
- 04. "Easy Bruh"
- 04. "Look at Me"
- 05. "The M. O. B. B."
- 06. "Down for You"
- 08. "Mr. Magik"
- 11. "Pour the Henny"
- 12. "Clear Black Nights"
- 13. "Discontinued"
- 14. "Love the Way (Down for You Pt. 2)"
- 15. "We the Real Thing"
