= The Infamous Archives =

Compilation album by Mobb Deep
- Released: March 13, 2007
- Recorded: mid-1990s–2006
- Genre: Hip-hop
- Length: 59:56
- Label: Streetcore Music
- Producers: Havoc; Prodigy

Mobb Deep chronology
Blood Money (2006)	The Infamous Archives (2007)	The Safe Is Cracked (2009)

The Infamous Archives is a compilation album by Queensbridge hip-hop duo Mobb Deep on March 13, 2007. The album consists of previously unreleased tracks. The first disc contains Mobb Deep's Back from a Hiatus mixtape from 1998. Rappers such as Sticky Fingaz, 50 Cent, Snoop Dogg and Busta Rhymes are featured. The song "In the Long Run" Prodigy spoke about the altercation between him and Keith Murray. In Prodigy's book he stated this release was not authorized by the group.

== Track listing ==
Disc One
No.	Title	Producer(s)	Length
1.	"Everyday Gun Play"	Havoc	3:51
2.	"First Day of Spring" (featuring Tragedy Khadafi)	Havoc	2:33
3.	"Untitled"	Havoc	1:28
4.	"Rep the QBC" (featuring Infamous Mobb)	Havoc	4:09
5.	"Reach" (featuring Chinky)	Havoc	4:39
6.	"In the Long Run" (featuring Ty Nitty)	Havoc	2:41
7.	"Young Luv"	Mobb Deep	3:38
8.	"Block Life" (featuring ACD)	Havoc	3:55
9.	"Shit Hits the Fan" (featuring Godfather)	A. Dog	2:56
10.	"Murderers" (featuring E-Moneybags & Majesty)	Mobb Deep	3:52
11.	"Thou Shall Not Kill" (featuring Snoop Dogg & Tray-Dee)	Havoc	4:19
12.	"Perfect Plot" (featuring Big Noyd)	Havoc	4:25
13.	"QB Meets Southside" (featuring Sticky Fingaz & X1)	Havoc	2:48
14.	"How You Like Me Now" (featuring Rah Digga)	Tone Mason	3:24

Disc Two
No.	Title	Producer(s)	Length
1.	"Cobra"	Havoc	3:24
2.	"Mobb Run the Rap Game"	Dr. Dre	2:21
3.	"Gangstas Roll"	Havoc	3:27
4.	"Bump That" (featuring 50 Cent & Big Noyd)	Havoc	3:55
5.	"My Priorities"	The Alchemist	2:47
6.	"Backwards"	The Alchemist	3:41
7.	"Gettin' Moved On"	Mobb Deep	3:30
8.	"U Know We Don't Stop"	Havoc	2:27
9.	"Rock with Us" (featuring Busta Rhymes)	Havoc	4:40
10.	"All Mine"	Mobb Deep	2:30
11.	"Never Talk" (featuring Mike Delorean)	Havoc	3:05
12.	"We Don't Love Them Hoes"	Havoc	2:59
13.	"Make the Hits" (featuring the Alchemist)	Havoc	2:43
14.	"Baby Baby"	S.C.	2:52
