= Special edition (disambiguation) =

A special edition is a term used as a marketing incentive for various kinds of products.

Special Edition may also refer to:

- "A Special Edition", a 1997 episode of The Outer Limits
- Special Edition (film), a 1938 British film
- Special Edition (Infamous Mobb album), 2002
- Special Edition (Jack DeJohnette album), 1980
