= Got It Twisted =

Single by Mobb Deep

from the album Amerikaz Nightmare
- Released: March 30, 2004
- Genre: Hip hop
- Length: 3:41
- Label: Jive Records
- Songwriter(s): Kejuan Muchita, Albert Johnson, Jo Kerr, Thomas Dolby
- Producer(s): The Alchemist

Mobb Deep singles chronology
"Get Away" (2002)	"Got It Twisted" (2004)	"Real Gangstaz" (2004)

"Got It Twisted" is the first single from Mobb Deep's 2004 album Amerikaz Nightmare. Produced by The Alchemist, the song samples the 1980s hit "She Blinded Me With Science" by Thomas Dolby. Big Noyd, Infamous Mobb, Jayo Felony, Kurupt, Illa Ghee, The Alchemist, DJ Felli Fel, and actor Danny Trejo are featured in the music video. There is also a remix which features Twista.

== Track listing ==
Side A

1. "Got It Twisted" [Dirty Version]
2. "Got It Twisted" [Instrumental]

Side B

1. "Got It Twisted" [Clean Version]
2. "Got It Twisted" [Acappella]

== Charts ==
=== Weekly charts ===
Chart (2004)	Peak position
US Billboard Hot 100	64
US Hot R&B/Hip-Hop Songs (Billboard)	23
US Hot Rap Songs (Billboard)	18
US Rhythmic (Billboard)	40

=== Year-end charts ===
Chart (2004)	Position
US Hot R&B/Hip-Hop Songs (Billboard)	78

== Release history ==
Region	Date	Format(s)	Label(s)	Ref.
United States	April 19, 2004	Urban contemporary radio	Jive, Zomba	
United States	April 26, 2004	Rhythmic contemporary radio	Jive, Zomba	
