= Gangstaz Roll =

Single by Mobb Deep
- B-side: "Clap Those Thangs"
- Released: August 12, 2003
- Genre: Hip-hop
- Label: Jive Records
- Songwriters: Havoc; Prodigy
- Producer: Havoc

Mobb Deep singles chronology
"Double Shots" (2003)	"Gangstaz Roll" (2003)	"Got It Twisted" (2004)

"Gangstaz Roll" is a 2003 single by the American hip-hop group Mobb Deep. It was the group's first release on Jive Records after leaving their previous label Loud Records. The single did not enter the charts and did not appear on their subsequent album Amerikaz Nightmare. The B-side was "Clap Those Thangs" featuring 50 Cent. The group eventually signed with 50 Cent's label, G-Unit Records, in 2005.

== Track listing ==
Side A

1. Gangstaz Roll (LP Version)
2. Gangstaz Roll (Clean Version)
3. Gangstaz Roll (Acapella)

Side B

1. Clap Those Thangs (LP Version)
2. Clap Those Thangs (Clean Version)
3. Clap Those Thangs (Acapella)

== Charts ==
Chart (2003)	Peak position
UK Singles (Official Charts Company)	127
US Hot R&B/Hip-Hop Songs (Billboard)	98
