= Hoodlum (soundtrack) =

Hoodlum: Music Inspired By the Motion Picture

Soundtrack album by Various artists
- Released: August 12, 1997
- Recorded: January 1997
- Genre: Hip hop; R&B
- Length: 53:18
- Label: Loud; Interscope
- Producer: Arlene Del Valle (exec.); Rich Isaacson (exec.); Mojo Nicosia (exec.); Adriana Evans; Chico DeBarge; Davina Bussey; Dred Scott; John Clayton; Kenneth Crouch; Madukwu Chinwah; Mobb Deep; Mr. DJ; Organized Noize; Rastine Calhoun III; Ron Fair; RZA; Sean "Puffy" Combs; Tony Rich; Walter "Mucho" Scott; Cherokee Chief (co.); El DeBarge (co.); Ol' Dirty Bastard (co.)

Singles from Hoodlum
- 1. "Hoodlum" Released: 1997; 2. "Zoom" Released: 1997; 3. "So Good" Released: October 1997; 4. "No Guarantee" Released: 1997

Professional ratings
Review scores
Source	Rating
AllMusic	4/5 stars

Hoodlum: Music Inspired By the Motion Picture is the soundtrack to Bill Duke's 1997 crime drama film Hoodlum. It was released on August 12, 1997 via Loud Records and Interscope Records, and consisted of a blend of hip hop and R&B music. The album features songs performed by 112, Adriana Evans, Big Boi, Big Bub, Big Noyd, Chico DeBarge, Cool Breeze, Davina, Erykah Badu, Faith Evans, L.V., Mobb Deep, Rahsaan Patterson, Rakim, Tony Rich and Wu-Tang Clan.

The soundtrack peaked at number 94 on the Billboard 200 and at number 23 on the Top R&B/Hip-Hop Albums chart in the United States. Mobb Deep's single "Hoodlum" reached number 29 on the Hot Rap Songs chart.

== Track listing ==
No.	Title	Writer(s)	Producer(s)	Length
1.	"Hoodlum" (performed by Mobb Deep featuring Big Noyd & Rakim)	Albert Johhnson; Kejuan Muchita; William Griffin; Tajuan Perry	Mobb Deep	4:16
2.	"So Good" (performed by Davina featuring Raekwon)	Davina Bussey	Davina Bussey	4:13
3.	"Basin Street Blues" (performed by L.V. featuring the Clayton-Hamilton Jazz Orchestra)	Spencer Williams	Ron Fair; John Clayton	2:08
4.	"I Can't Believe" (performed by 112 featuring Faith Evans)	Sean Combs; Steven Jordan; Daron Jones; Michael Keith; Marvin Scandrick; Quinnes Parker; Courtney Sills	Sean "Puffy" Combs; Stevie J	3:27
5.	"Dirty the Moocher" (performed by Wu-Tang Clan)	Wu-Tang Clan; Cab Calloway; Clarence Gaskill; Irving Mills	RZA; Ol' Dirty Bastard (co.); The Cherokee Chiefs (co.)	3:11
6.	"Lucky Dayz" (performed by Adriana Evans)	Adriana Evans; Jonathan "Dred" Scott; Rastine Calhoun III	Rastine Calhoun III; Jonathan "Dred" Scott; Adriana Evans	3:26
7.	"Gangsta Partna" (performed by Cool Breeze featuring Big Boi)	Organized Noize; David Sheats; Frederick Bell; Antwan Patton	Mr. DJ; Organized Noize	5:18
8.	"Zoom" (performed by Big Bub)	Lionel Richie; Ronald LaPread	Walter "Mucho" Scott	4:52
9.	"Street Life" (performed by Rahsaan Patterson)	Joe Sample; Will Jennings	Kenneth Crouch; Rahsaan Patterson	5:15
10.	"Certainly" (performed by Erykah Badu)	Erykah Badu; "Madi" Madukwu Chinwah	Madukwu Chinwah	4:57
11.	"No Guarantee" (performed by Chico DeBarge)	Chico DeBarge	Chico DeBarge; El DeBarge (add.)	4:06
12.	"Harlem Is Home" (performed by Tony Rich)	Tony Rich	Tony Rich	4:31
Total length:				53:18

Notes

- "Dirty the Moocher" embodies portions of "Minnie the Moocher"; written by Cab Calloway, Clarence Gaskill, and Irving Mills; as performed by Cab Calloway.

== Score ==
A second soundtrack, featuring Elmer Bernstein's score for the film, was issued by RCA Victor Red Seal/BMG Classics at the time of the film's release. The score was recorded in London by the Royal Philharmonic Orchestra, conducted by the composer. The album was produced by the composer's daughter, Emilie A. Bernstein (who also orchestrated the score).

=== Track listing ===
No.	Title	Length
1.	"Prologue"	5:12
2.	"Bumpy and the Queen"	4:13
3.	"Bub and Company"	2:08
4.	"The Present"	3:27
5.	"Francine"	3:11
6.	"Death and the Opera"	3:26
7.	"Mourning"	5:18
8.	"Revenge"	4:52
9.	"From the Womb to the Tomb"	5:15
10.	"Dangerous Mission"	4:57
11.	"The Aftermath"	4:06
12.	"Goodbyes"	4:31
13.	"Amazing Grace"	2:42
Total length:		53:35

== Charts ==
Chart (1997)	Peak position
US Billboard 200	94
US Top R&B/Hip-Hop Albums (Billboard)	23
