= Illustrious =

Illustrious may refer to:

- HMS Illustrious, five ships in the Royal Navy
- Illustrious (album), a 2008 hip hop album by Big Noyd
- Illustrious class aircraft carrier, a class of aircraft carrier of the Royal Navy
- Illustrious Highness, a form of address for Germanic nobility
- Mari Illustrious Makinami, fictional character of Rebuild of Evangelion

== See also ==
- Antiochus IV Epiphanes
