= Have a Party =

Single by Mobb Deep featuring 50 Cent and Nate Dogg

from the album Get Rich or Die Tryin': Music from and Inspired by the Motion Picture & Blood Money
- Released: March 2, 2006
- Genre: Hip hop
- Length: 3:56
- Label: G-Unit; Interscope
- Songwriters: Curtis Jackson; Albert Johnson; Kejuan Muchita; Nathaniel Dwayne Hale; Farid Nassar
- Producer: Fredwreck

Mobb Deep singles chronology
"Outta Control (Remix)" (2005)	"Have a Party" (2006)	"Put Em in Their Place" (2006)

50 Cent singles chronology
"I'll Whip Ya Head Boy" (2006)	"Have a Party" (2006)	"Hands Up" (2006)

Nate Dogg singles chronology
"Shake That" (2006)	"Have a Party" (2006)	"Boss' Life" (2007)

"Have a Party" is the first single from rap group Mobb Deep's 2006 album Blood Money, and is also the fourth single from soundtrack of the film Get Rich Or Die Tryin'. It is a hip hop song, and is also their debut single with G-Unit Records. The song features 50 Cent and Nate Dogg on the chorus.

== Background ==
The track samples "I Love Rock 'n' Roll" by Joan Jett & The Blackhearts.

== Music video ==
The music video starts with three girls winning an invitation to the G-Unit mansion after purchasing the CD single. At their home, they listen to Funkmaster Flex on the radio and leave afterwards for Fifty's mansion. Cameo appearances are made by G-Unit artists Young Buck, Lloyd Banks, Tony Yayo & Spider Loc.

The music video on YouTube has received over 16 million views as of September 2026.

== Chart performance ==
Released in 2006 the single reached 49 on the Hot R&B/Hip-Hop Songs and 23 on the Hot Rap Tracks.

== Chart positions ==
Chart (2006)	Peak position
US Bubbling Under Hot 100 Singles (Billboard)	5
US Hot R&B/Hip-Hop Songs (Billboard)	49
US Hot Rap Tracks (Billboard)	23
