= Return to Soul Vol 1 =

Studio album by Davina
- Released: June 29, 2007
- Genre: Electronica; neo soul; hip hop; drum and bass; soul
- Length: 45:00
- Label: Soul Line Associates; Hustlemode
- Producer: Davina

Davina chronology
Best of Both Worlds (1998)	Return to Soul Vol 1 (2007)

Return to Soul Vol 1 (also stylized as Return to Soul Volume One) is the second album by American R&B singer Davina released on June 29, 2007, via her own label, Soul Line Associates.

== Album information ==
After a ten-year hiatus from music, Davina returned to the scene as a vocalist in 2007 with the independent release of Return to Soul Vol 1; utilizing her skills as a: singer, songwriter, producer, and engineer. With this album Davina has crafted an eclectic piece of work that spans hip-hop flavored neo-soul, dreamy electronica, and drum and bass.

== Reviews ==
Norman Meyers of Nu-Soul Magazine says "Davina sells these tracks thanks to her appropriately husky voice and honey-dipped delivery. But the album surprises halfway through with some more experimental sounds that liven things up. The skittering drum and bass staccato rhythms of "Stop" is one such track as is the broken beat "Walk On Bye". The bizarre electronics of "Gone" elevates the standard "get yo shit and gone" track into another arena. With this album it appears that Davina is truly embracing the future."

== Track listing ==
1. "What's Goin' On"- 5:16
2. "Umm Humm"- 3:26
3. "Lets Stay Together"- 3:31
4. "Ready"- 4:23
5. "Red Sky"- 3:40
6. "Get Live"- 4:31
7. "Stop"- 4:23
8. "My Blues Away"- 4:17
9. "Gone"- 2:43
10. "Walk On Bye"- 4:16
11. "Is It the Way"- 4:47
