= Get Away (Mobb Deep song) =

Single by Mobb Deep

from the album Infamy
- Released: May 28, 2002
- Recorded: 2001
- Genre: Hip hop
- Length: 3:40
- Label: Loud Records
- Songwriters: Havoc; Prodigy
- Producer: Ez Elpee

Mobb Deep singles chronology
"Hey Luv (Anything)" (2001)	"Get Away" (2002)	"Got It Twisted" (2004)

"Get Away" is the third single from Mobb Deep's Infamy album. The song is produced by Ez Elpee & the music video is directed by Diane Martel. This b-side features the song "Hey Luv (Anything)", the group's previous single, featuring 112.

== Track listing ==
Side A

1. "Get Away" [Clean Version]
2. "Get Away" [Dirty Version]
3. "Get Away" [Instrumental]

Side B

1. "Hey Luv (Anything)" [Clean Version]
2. "Hey Luv (Anything)" [Dirty Version]
3. "Hey Luv (Anything)" [Instrumental]

== Charts ==
Chart (2002)	Peak position
Billboard Hot R&B/Hip-Hop Singles & Tracks	35
