= Come Over to My Place =

Single by Davina

from the album Best of Both Worlds
- Released: March 10, 1998
- Genre: R&B; neo soul
- Length: 3:55
- Label: Loud
- Songwriter(s): Davina
- Producer(s): Davina

Davina singles chronology
"So Good" (1997)	"Come Over to My Place" (1998)

Come Over to My Place is the second single by Davina, released from her debut album, Best of Both Worlds in 1998. The single peaked at eighty-one on Billboard Hot 100.

== Background ==
Come Over to My Place was written and produced by Davina.

== Chart positions ==
Chart	Position
Billboard Hot 100	81
