= Infamy (album) =

Studio album by Mobb Deep
- Released: December 11, 2001
- Recorded: April – October 2001
- Studios: Kejuan Entertainment Studios (Long Island, NY); Right Track Recording (New York, NY); Chung King Studios (New York, NY); Sony Music Studios (New York, NY)
- Genre: Hip-hop
- Length: 1:11:02
- Labels: Infamous; Violator; SRC; Loud; Columbia
- Producers: EZ Elpee; Havoc; Scott Storch; The Alchemist

Mobb Deep chronology
Murda Muzik (1999)	Infamy (2001)	Amerikaz Nightmare (2004)

Singles from Infamy
- 1. "The Learning (Burn)" Released: October 30, 2001; 2. "Hey Luv (Anything)" Released: January 2002; 3. "Get Away" Released: May 28, 2002; 4. "Pray for Me" Released: 2002

Professional ratings
Review scores
Source	Rating
AllMusic	3/5 stars
Entertainment Weekly	C+
HipHopDX	4/5
Los Angeles Times	3/4 stars
RapReviews	6.5/10
Rolling Stone	2.5/5 stars
Spin	5/10
The Guardian	2/5 stars
The New Rolling Stone Album Guide	2/5 stars

Infamy is the fifth studio album by American East Coast hip-hop duo Mobb Deep. It was released on December 11, 2001 through Loud Records. Recording sessions took place at Kejuan Entertainment Studios, Right Track Recording, Chung King Studios and Sony Music Studios in New York City. Production was handled by Havoc, Scott Storch, EZ Elpee and the Alchemist. It features guest appearances from Big Noyd, 112, Infamous Mobb, Lil' Mo, Littles, Ron Isley and Vita.

In the United States, the album peaked at number 22 on the Billboard 200 and atop the Top R&B/Hip-Hop Albums charts. It was certified gold by the Recording Industry Association of America on January 29, 2002 for selling 500,000 copies in the US alone. The album also peaked at number 135 on the French Albums and number 26 on the UK Official Hip Hop and R&B Albums charts.

The album was supported with four singles: "The Learning (Burn)", "Hey Luv (Anything)", "Get Away" and "Pray for Me". Its lead single, "The Learning (Burn)", reached number 99 on the Billboard Hot 100. The second single off of the album, "Hey Luv (Anything)", peaked at number 58 on the Billboard Hot 100. The album's third single, "Get Away", made it to number 35 on the Billboard Hot R&B/Hip-Hop Songs. The songs "The Learning (Burn)" and "Crawlin" serves as diss tracks towards Jay-Z in response to the song "Takeover".

== Track listing ==
No.	Title	Writer(s)	Producer(s)	Length
1.	"Pray for Me" (featuring Lil' Mo)	Albert Johnson; Kejuan Muchita; Cynthia Loving-Stone	Havoc	3:22
2.	"Get Away"	Johnson; Muchita; Lamont Porter; Richard Leslie Holroyd	Ez Elpee	3:40
3.	"Bounce"	Johnson; Muchita	Havoc	4:13
4.	"Clap"	Johnson; Muchita	Havoc	4:53
5.	"Kill That Nigga"	Johnson; Muchita	Havoc	3:47
6.	"My Gats Spitting" (featuring Infamous Mobb)	Johnson; Muchita; Jamal Abdul Raheem; James Chandler; Lionel Cooper	Havoc	4:34
7.	"Handcuffs"	Johnson; Muchita	Havoc	3:34
8.	"Hey Luv (Anything)" (featuring 112)	Johnson; Muchita; Daron Jones; Marvin Scandrick; Michael Keith; Quinnes Parker	Havoc	4:04
9.	"The Learning (Burn)" (featuring Big Noyd and Vita)	Johnson; Muchita; TaJuan Perry; LaVita Raynor	Havoc	4:17
10.	"Live Foul"	Johnson; Muchita; Scott Storch	Scott Storch	4:24
11.	"Hurt Niggas" (featuring Big Noyd)	Johnson; Muchita; Perry	Havoc	3:30
12.	"Get at Me"	Johnson; Muchita	The Alchemist	3:33
13.	"I Won't Fall"	Johnson; Muchita	Scott Storch	4:20
14.	"Crawlin'"	Johnson; Muchita	Havoc	4:07
15.	"Nothing Like Home" (featuring Littles)	Johnson; Muchita; Alfredo Bryan	Havoc	4:27
16.	"There I Go Again" (featuring Ron Isley)	Johnson; Muchita; Storch	Scott Storch	6:48
17.	"So Long"	Johnson; Muchita	Havoc	3:27
Total length:				1:11:02

Sample credits

- Track 2 contains elements from "Taking Me Higher" written by Les Holroyd and performed by Barclay James Harvest.

== Personnel ==
- Kejuan "Havoc" Muchita – vocals, producer (tracks 1, 3–9, 11, 14, 15, 17), executive producer
- Albert "Prodigy" Johnson – vocals, executive producer
- Cynthia "Lil' Mo" Loving-Stone – vocals (track 1)
- Jamal "Big Twins/Twin Gambino" Raheem – vocals (track 6)
- Lionel "G.O.D. Pt. III" Cooper – vocals (track 6)
- James "Ty Nitty" Chandler – vocals (track 6)
- Marvin "Slim" Scandrick – vocals (track 8)
- Michael "Mike" Keith – vocals (track 8)
- Quinnes "Q" Parker – vocals (track 8)
- Daron Jones – vocals (track 8)
- TaJuan "Big Noyd" Perry – vocals (tracks: 9, 11)
- LaVita "Vita" Raynor – backing vocals (track 9)
- Alfredo "Littles" Bryan – vocals (track 15)
- Ronald Isley – vocals (track 16)
- Kandy Johnson – additional vocals (track 16)
- Kim Johnson – additional vocals (track 16)
- Carl "Chucky" Thompson – strings (track 8)
- Lamont "Ez Elpee" Porter – producer (track 2)
- Scott Storch – producer (tracks: 10, 13, 16)
- Daniel Alan "The Alchemist" Maman – producer (track 12)
- Ronald "Gotti" Odum – production assistant
- Claudine Joseph – production coordinator
- Steve Sola – recording, mixing
- Jonathan 'Lighty' Williams – recording, mixing (tracks: 1–11, 13–16), executive producer, A&R
- Sheldon Guide – mixing (track 12), additional mixing, additional engineering
- Oscar Monsalve – mixing (track 17), additional engineering, engineering assistant
- Frank Zago – engineering assistant
- Halsey Quemere – engineering assistant
- Jamie Garcia – engineering assistant
- Bernie Grundman – mastering
- Chris Feldmann – art direction, design
- Michael Lavine – photography
- Will Kennedy – image editing
- Darrell Steven "Big Baby Chris" Lighty – A&R
- Gail Hansen – A&R
- Trakelle Frazier – A&R
- Steve Shapiro – legal
- Violator – production coordinator, A&R, management
- Monica Morrow – stylist

== Charts ==
=== Weekly charts ===
Chart (2001)	Peak position
French Albums (SNEP)	135
UK R&B Albums (Official Charts)	26
US Billboard 200	22
US Top R&B/Hip-Hop Albums (Billboard)	1

=== Year-end charts ===
Chart (2002)	Position
Canadian R&B Albums (Nielsen SoundScan)	102
Canadian Rap Albums (Nielsen SoundScan)	56
US Billboard 200	117
US Top R&B/Hip-Hop Albums (Billboard)	26

== Certifications ==
Region	Certification	Certified units/sales
United States (RIAA)	Gold	500,000^{^}
^{^} Shipments figures based on certification alone.
