= Burn (Mobb Deep song) =

"The Learning (Burn)"

Single by Mobb Deep featuring Vita and Big Noyd

from the album Infamy
- Released: October 30, 2001
- Genre: Gangsta rap, East coast hip hop
- Length: 4:17
- Label: Loud
- Songwriters: TaJuan Perry; Kejuan Muchita; Albert Johnson; La'Vita Raynor
- Producer: Havoc

Mobb Deep singles chronology
"U.S.A. (Aiight Then)" (2000)	"The Learning (Burn)" (2001)	"Hey Luv (Anything)" (2001)

"The Learning (Burn)" is the first single from Mobb Deep's fifth album Infamy. The song features Big Noyd and Vita.

== Background ==
Prodigy's verse contains a subliminal diss towards Jay-Z, in response to Jay-Z having dissed Prodigy during his live performance at 2001's Summer Jam and in his diss track Takeover.

== Music video ==
The music video was directed by Diane Martel & features a cameo by DJ Kay Slay. Although Vita raps on the chorus of the song, she does not appear in the music video because Irv Gotti who was the boss of her record label Murder Inc. Records, wouldn't allow her to do so due to Prodigy beefing with Jay-Z and dissing him in the song, as Irv Gotti and Jay-Z had a strong friendship. In a December 2016 interview on Real Talk Tru Stories Podcast, Murder Inc. Records artist Black Child said that Vita doesn't appear in the music video because Irv Gotti wanted Mobb Deep to pay an appearance fee for Vita to be in the video but Mobb Deep expected that they wouldn't have to when it was a business move so Irv Gotti didn't sign off on it and Vita couldn't be in the music video.

== Charts ==
(2001–02)	Peak position
US Billboard Hot 100	99
US Hot R&B/Hip-Hop Songs (Billboard)	56

== Track listing ==
Side A

1. "Burn" [Clean version]

Side B

1. "Burn" [Dirty version]
2. "Burn" [Instrumental]
