= Amerikaz Nightmare =

Studio album by Mobb Deep
- Released: August 10, 2004
- Recorded: 2003–2004
- Studios: Battery (New York, NY); Chung King (New York, NY); Dunn Deal (New York, NY); Ocean Way (California); The Lab (New York, NY); The Hit Factory Criteria (Miami, FL); Powerhouse (Yonkers, NY); Record Plant (Hollywood, CA); DSL (Louisville, KY)
- Genre: Hip-hop
- Length: 61:27
- Labels: Infamous; Jive; Zomba
- Producers: Alchemist; Havoc; Kanye West; Lil Jon; Red Spyda

Mobb Deep chronology
Infamy (2001)	Amerikaz Nightmare (2004)	Blood Money (2006)

Singles from Amerikaz Nightmare
- 1. "Got It Twisted" Released: March 30, 2004; 2. "Real Gangstaz" Released: August 31, 2004

Amerikaz Nightmare is the sixth album by the American hip-hop duo Mobb Deep. It was released on August 10, 2004, via Infamous and Jive Records. The recording sessions took place at Battery Studios, Chung King Studios, Dunn Deal Studios and The Lab, in New York City, and at Ocean Way Studios in California, The Hit Factory Criteria in Miami, Powerhouse Studios in Yonkers, the Record Plant in Hollywood, and DSL Studios in Louisville. The album was produced by group member Havoc as well as the Alchemist, Kanye West, Lil' Jon and Red Spyda. It features guest appearances from Big Noyd, Jadakiss, Lil' Jon, Littles, Nate Dogg and Twista.

In the United States, the album debuted at number 4 on the Billboard 200 with 109,000 copies sold in its first week. It also made it to No. 33 in France, No. 50 in Switzerland, No. 68 on the UK Albums Chart, and No. 95 in Germany.

The album was supported with two singles: "Got It Twisted" and "Real Gangstaz". Its lead single, "Got It Twisted", reached No. 64 on the Billboard Hot 100 and No. 23 on the Hot R&B/Hip-Hop Songs in the United States. The second single off of the album, "Real Gangstaz", peaked at No. 49 on the US Hot R&B/Hip-Hop Songs. Accompanying music videos for both singles were directed by Benny Boom.

In a 2025 episode of Fat Joe and Jadakiss's podcast Joe and Jada, the Alchemist revealed that the song Win or Lose was saved on his computer and originally meant for Jadakiss and Styles P, but after Mobb Deep recalled the beat, it ended up on their album.

== Critical reception ==
Professional ratings
Aggregate scores
Source	Rating
Metacritic	63/100
Review scores
Source	Rating
AllHipHop	4/5 stars
AllMusic	3.5/5 stars
HipHopDX	3/5
Now	3/5 Ns
RapReviews	8.5/10
Spin	C−
Vibe	3.5/5 marks

Amerikaz Nightmare was met with generally favourable reviews from music critics. At Metacritic, which assigns a normalized rating out of 100 to reviews from mainstream publications, the album received an average score of 63, based on eight reviews.

Steve 'Flash' Juon of RapReviews praised the album, writing "there are songs on here so thorough and ill they'll send a chill down your spine and raise the hair on your neck". AllMusic's David Jeffries resumed: "they've sounded stuck and overconfident before, but this old-school-styled, true hip-hop album finds the Mobb hungry again". HipHopDX contributor found "just like every Mobb Deep release after Murda Muzik, Amerikaz Nightmare is highly inconsistent". Nick Flanagan of Now admitted "Havoc's production stays strong while his verbal skills remain at the fore, and Prodigy returns to his earlier rhyme style after a short period of sluggish verses". Spin reviewer gave a mixed feedback, stating "big-name cameos... can't disguise the fact that this is one more rote chapter in the infamous Queensbridge duo's twilight".

== Track listing ==
No.	Title	Writer(s)	Producer(s)	Length
1.	"Amerikaz Nightmare"	Kejuan Muchita; Albert Johnson	Havoc	4:57
2.	"Win or Lose"	Muchita; Johnson; Alan Maman; William Mitchell; Earl Randle; James Shaw	The Alchemist	3:12
3.	"Flood the Block"	Muchita; Johnson	Havoc	2:56
4.	"Dump" (featuring Nate Dogg)	Muchita; Johnson; Nathaniel Hale	Havoc	3:17
5.	"Got It Twisted"	Muchita; Johnson; Maman; Jonathan Kerr; Thomas Robertson	The Alchemist	3:41
6.	"When U Hear The"	Muchita; Johnson; Maman	The Alchemist	2:52
7.	"Real Niggaz"	Muchita; Johnson; Andy Thelusma	Red Spyda	4:39
8.	"Shorty Wop"	Muchita; Johnson	Havoc	3:33
9.	"Real Gangstaz" (featuring Lil' Jon)	Muchita; Johnson; Jonathan Smith	Lil' Jon	4:08
10.	"One of Ours Part II" (featuring Jadakiss)	Muchita; Johnson; Jason Phillips	Havoc	4:21
11.	"On the Run"	Muchita; Johnson	Havoc	3:46
12.	"Throw Your Hands (In the Air)"	Muchita; Johnson; Kanye West	Kanye West	3:57
13.	"Get Me" (featuring Littles and Big Noyd)	Muchita; Johnson; Alfredo Bryant; Tajuan Perry	Havoc	4:31
14.	"We Up"	Muchita; Johnson	Havoc	2:58
15.	"Neva Change"	Muchita; Johnson; James Porter	Havoc	3:55
16.	"Got It Twisted Remix" (featuring Twista)	Muchita; Johnson; Maman; Kerr; Robertson	The Alchemist	4:43
Total length:				1:01:27

Notes

- "One of Ours Part II" is a sequel to "One of Ours", from the BarberShop 2: Back in Business soundtrack.

Sample credits

- Track 2 contains a sample from "Here I Go Again" written by Willie Mitchell, Earl Randle and James Shaw as performed by Jean Plum.
- Tracks 5 and 16 contain samples from "She Blinded Me with Science" written by Jonathan Kerr and Thomas Robertson as performed by Thomas Dolby, and "Saturday Night Style" written by Michael Campbell as performed by Mikey Dread.
- Track 12 contains a sample from "Live In Connecticut" written by Curtis Fisher as performed by the Cold Crush Brothers.
- Track 15 contains a sample from "Time for a Change" written by Jim Porter as performed by the Eight Minutes.

== Personnel ==
- Kejuan "Havoc" Muchita – vocals, producer (tracks 1, 3, 4, 8, 10, 11, 13–15)
- Albert "Prodigy" Johnson – vocals
- Nathaniel "Nate Dogg" Hale – vocals (track 4)
- Jonathan "Lil Jon" Smith – vocals & producer (track 9)
- Jason "Jadakiss" Phillips – vocals (track 10)
- Alfredo "Littles" Bryant – vocals (track 13)
- Tajuan "Big Noyd" Perry – vocals (track 13)
- Carl "Twista" Mitchell – vocals (track 16)
- Robert "R.O.B." McDowell – keyboards (track 9)
- Alan "the Alchemist" Maman – producer (tracks 2, 5, 6, 16)
- Andy "Red Spyda" Thelusma – producer (track 7)
- Kanye West – producer (track 12)
- Steve Sola – recording, mixing
- Ray Seay – recording (track 9)
- Dragan Čačinović – recording (track 10)
- Manny Marroquin – recording (track 12)
- Mike Baker – recording (track 16)
- Michael Berman – recording assistant (tracks 1, 3–5, 7–9, 13–15), mixing assistant (tracks 5, 7, 9, 11, 13–16)
- Jay Nicholas – recording assistant & mixing assistant (track 2)
- Chris Steffen – recording assistant (track 4)
- Keith Sengbusch – recording assistant (tracks: 5, 11), mixing assistant (track 5)
- Steve Sisco – recording assistant & mixing assistant (track 6)
- Ari Raskin – recording assistant (tracks: 7, 8), mixing assistant (tracks: 8, 10)
- Kevin Smestead – mixing assistant (track 1)
- Mike Tschupp – mixing assistant (track 3)
- Jason Finkel – mixing assistant (track 4)
- Tom Coyne – mastering
- Daniel Hastings – art direction, design, photography

== Charts ==
=== Weekly charts ===
Chart (2004)	Peak position
French Albums (SNEP)	33
German Albums (Offizielle Top 100)	95
Swiss Albums (Schweizer Hitparade)	50
UK Albums (Official Charts)	68
UK R&B Albums (Official Charts)	14
US Billboard 200	4
US Top R&B/Hip-Hop Albums (Billboard)	2

=== Year-end charts ===
Chart (2004)	Position
US Top R&B/Hip-Hop Albums (Billboard)	82
