= Give It to Me (Mobb Deep song) =

Mobb Deep song

Single by Mobb Deep featuring Young Buck

from the album Blood Money
- Released: May 2, 2006
- Genre: Hip hop
- Length: 3:08
- Label: G-Unit; Interscope Records
- Songwriter(s): Havoc; Prodigy; Young Buck; Sameer Anjaan; Curtis Jackson; Jatin–Lalit
- Producer(s): Profile

Mobb Deep singles chronology
"Put Em in Their Place" (2006)	"Give It to Me" (2006)	"Creep" (2006)

Young Buck singles chronology
"Look at Me Now" (2004)	"Give It to Me" (2006)	"I Know You Want Me" (2006)

Give It to Me is the third single from Mobb Deep's debut album with G-Unit Records, Blood Money. The song features Young Buck and is produced by Profile. It samples Kuch Kuch Hota Hai.

== Music video ==
In the music video directed by Jessy Terrero it features various cameo appearances by G-Unit members including Spider Loc, 50 Cent, Lloyd Banks, Hot Rod and Tony Yayo.
