= Only the Strong (Big Noyd album) =

Only The Strong

Studio album by Big Noyd
- Released: September 23, 2003
- Genre: Hip hop
- Length: 52:42
- Label: LandSpeed
- Producer: Alchemist; DJ Sebb; Emile; Havoc; Noyd Inc.; Steve Sola

Big Noyd chronology
Episodes of a Hustla (1996)	Only The Strong (2003)	On the Grind (2005)

Professional ratings
Review scores
Source	Rating
AllMusic	3/5 stars
HipHopDX	3/5
Now	3/5
RapReviews	4/10

Only The Strong is the second solo studio album by American rapper Big Noyd. It was released on September 23, 2003, via Landspeed Records. The album was produced by the Alchemist, Havoc, Emile, DJ Sebb, Steve Sola, and Noyd Inc. It features guest appearances from Mobb Deep, Chinky, Infamous Mobb, PMD, and Shamika Rodriguez.

== Track listing ==
No.	Title	Writer(s)	Producer(s)	Length
1.	"Only the Strong Intro"	Tajuan Perry; Alan Maman	Alchemist	0:30
2.	"Watch Out"	Perry; Kejuan Muchita	Havoc	3:38
3.	"Shoot 'Em Up (Bang Bang), Pt. 1"	Perry; Maman	Alchemist	3:33
4.	"Something for All That" (featuring Prodigy)	Perry; Albert Johnson	Noyd Inc.	2:56
5.	"We Gangsta"	Perry; Muchita	Havoc	3:39
6.	"Being on Point (Prelude)"	Perry		0:49
7.	"All 4 the Luv of the Dough" (featuring Prodigy)	Perry; Johnson; Muchita	Havoc	3:04
8.	"Invincible" (featuring Infamous Mobb, Chinky and Shamika Rodriguez)	Perry; Jamal Raheem; Lionel Cooper; James Chandler; Muchita	Havoc	5:20
9.	"Wildin' on the Tour Bus Skit"	Perry		1:06
10.	"Noyd Holdin' It Down" (featuring Havoc)	Perry; Muchita; Maman	Alchemist	2:56
11.	"Shoot 'Em Up (Bang Bang), Pt. 2" (featuring Mobb Deep)	Perry; Johnson; Muchita; Maman	Alchemist	3:47
12.	"Air It Out" (featuring Havoc)	Perry; Muchita; Maman	Alchemist	3:27
13.	"Higher" (featuring Shakim)	Perry; Emile Haynie	Emile	3:10
14.	"Going Right at 'Em" (featuring PMD)	Perry; Parrish Smith; Sébastien Vuignier	DJ Sebb	3:18
15.	"That Fire" (featuring V12)	Perry; Steve Sola	Steve Sola	3:47
16.	"The Kid Is Nice"	Perry; Haynie	Emile	3:29
17.	"N.O.Y.D."	Perry; Maman	Alchemist	4:13
Total length:				52:42

Sample credits

- Track 3 contains elements from "Shoot 'Em Up Movies" performed by the Deele
- Track 11 contains elements from "Cowboys to Girls" performed by the Intruders

== Personnel ==
- Tajuan "Big Noyd" Perry – vocals, executive producer
- Albert "Prodigy" Johnson – vocals (tracks: 4, 7, 11)
- Jamal "Big Twins/Twin Gambino" Raheem – vocals (track 8)
- Lionel "G.O.D. Pt. III" Cooper – vocals (track 8)
- James "Ty Knitty" Chandler – vocals (track 8)
- Shalene "Chinky" Evans – vocals (track 8)
- Shamika Rodriguez – vocals (track 8)
- Kejuan "Havoc" Muchita – vocals (tracks: 10–12), producer (tracks: 2, 5, 7, 8)
- Shakim – vocals (track 13)
- Parrish "PMD" Smith – vocals (track 14)
- Shaun "V-12" Walker – vocals (track 15)
- Alan "The Alchemist" Maman – producer (tracks: 1, 3, 10, 11, 12, 17), executive producer
- Noyd Inc. – producer (track 4)
- Emile Haynie – producer (tracks: 13, 16)
- Sébastien "DJ Sebb" Vuignier – producer (track 14)
- Steve Sola – producer (track 15)

== Charts ==
Chart performance for Only The Strong
Chart (2003)	Peak position
US Top R&B/Hip-Hop Albums (Billboard)	45
US Independent Albums (Billboard)	27
US Heatseekers Albums (Billboard)	36
