= So Good (Davina song) =

Single by Davina

from the album Best of Both Worlds and Hoodlum: Music Inspired By the Motion Picture
- Released: October 1997
- Genre: R&B; neo soul
- Length: 4:40
- Label: Loud
- Songwriter(s): Davina; John Lewis
- Producer(s): Davina

Davina singles chronology
"So Good" (1997)	"Come Over to My Place" (1998)

"So Good" is the first single by Davina taken from her debut studio album, Best of Both Worlds. The single was released in October 1997 and peaked at number sixty on the Billboard Hot 100 chart. The song received two remixes, one by Raekwon and the other by Xzibit.

== Background ==
"So Good" was produced by Davina.

== Charts ==
Chart (1997)	Position
Billboard Hot 100	60
