= Best of Both Worlds (Davina album) =

Studio album by Davina
- Released: April 7, 1998
- Recorded: 1997–1998
- Studio: Silver Sun Recording (Flint, MI); Track Records (North Hollywood, CA)
- Genre: R&B; neo soul; house; hip hop
- Length: 56:34
- Label: Loud; RCA
- Producer: Davina

Davina chronology
Best of Both Worlds (1998)	Return to Soul Vol 1 (2007)

Singles from Best of Both Worlds
- 1. "So Good" Released: October 1997; 2. "Come Over to My Place" Released: March 10, 1998

Professional ratings
Review scores
Source	Rating
AllMusic	3/5 stars

Best of Both Worlds is the debut studio album by American R&B singer Davina. It was released on April 7, 1998, through Loud/RCA Records. The recording sessions took place at Silver Sun Recording in Flint and at Track Records in North Hollywood. The production was handled by Davina herself, with Mojoe Nicosia serving as an executive producer.

The album debuted at number 180 on the Billboard 200, number 34 on the Top R&B/Hip-Hop Albums and number 7 on the Heatseekers Albums in the United States. Its singles "So Good" and "Come Over to My Place" managed to make it to the US Billboard Hot 100, peaking at No. 60 and No. 81 on the chart respectively.

Failing to gain any real commercial success, Davina was dropped from Loud Records due to the album's poor sales.

== Track listing ==
No.	Title	Writer(s)	Length
1.	"Come Over to My Place"	Davina Bussey	3:56
2.	"Comin' for You"	Bussey	4:16
3.	"So Good"	Bussey; John Lewis	4:34
4.	"When It Rains"	Bussey	3:55
5.	"Love's Comin' Down"	Bussey; Kirk Wan	4:03
6.	"I Can't Help It"	Stevie Wonder; Susaye Greene	4:27
7.	"Give Me Love"	Bussey	3:56
8.	"Mercy"	Bussey	3:42
9.	"Getz No Where"	Bussey	3:46
10.	"Only One Reason"	Bussey; Wan	3:55
11.	"The Way I Feel About You"	Bussey; Kisha Chavis; Wan	4:12
12.	"After the Rain"	Bussey	6:47
13.	"My Cryin' Blues"	Bussey	5:05
Total length:			56:34

Bonus track
No.	Title	Writer(s)	Length
14.	"Is It the Way"	Bussey	4:00

== Personnel ==
- Davina Bussey – vocals, drum programming (tracks: 6, 9, 11), keyboards (tracks: 7, 12), programming (tracks: 1–11, 14), arranger, producer (tracks: 1–13), mixing (tracks: 1–12)
- Prudensca Renfro – backing vocals (tracks: 1, 2, 4–6, 8–10, 12)
- Tonia Johnson – backing vocals (tracks: 1, 2, 4–6, 8–10, 12)
- De'Andrea Foster – backing vocals (track 7)
- Donica Holmes – backing vocals (track 7)
- Kisha Chavis – backing vocals (track 11)
- Everett Turner – trumpet (track 1)
- Paul Riser – strings arranger (tracks: 4, 12)
- Detroit Symphony Orchestra – orchestration (tracks: 4, 12)
- David Charles Foreman – guitar (track 5)
- Chris Bruce – guitar (tracks: 6, 12)
- Joseph "Amp" Fiddler – keyboards (tracks: 6, 12, 13)
- Thomas "Bubz" Fiddler – bass guitar (tracks: 6, 13), bass & bass guitar arranger (track 12)
- Nicholas "Nick Wiz" Loizides – drum programming (tracks: 6, 9, 11)
- Milton Honore – guitar (tracks: 7, 14)
- Anthony Brewster – keyboards (track 7)
- Brian Lawrence – bass guitar (track 7)
- Lasuan Dandee – drums (track 7)
- Kirk Wan – additional drum programming (tracks: 7, 8)
- Humberto "DJ Dez" Hernandez – scratches (track 9)
- Ronald Wright – drums (tracks: 12, 13)
- Bernard Terry – recording, mixing (tracks: 1–3, 5, 7–9, 11–13), second engineering (tracks: 4, 6, 10)
- Larry Ferguson – mixing (tracks: 4, 6, 10)
- Darrell Thorp – recording assistant (track 14)
- Michael Freeman – recording assistant (track 14)
- Sergio Garcia – mixing assistant (tracks: 2, 3, 11, 13)
- Tom VerDonck – second engineering (tracks: 4, 6, 10)
- Joe "Mojoe" Nicosia – executive producer, A&R
- Maurice Whitaker – art direction
- Mark Seliger – photography
- QuanZilla – artwork assistant
- Che Harris – coordinator
- Laurie Marks – coordinator
- Liz Hausle – coordinator
- Ola Kudu – creative director

== Charts ==
Chart (1998)	Peak position
US Billboard 200	180
US Top R&B Albums (Billboard)	34
US Heatseekers Albums (Billboard)	7
