= Real Gangstaz =

Single by Mobb Deep featuring Lil Jon

from the album Amerikaz Nightmare
- Released: August 31, 2004
- Genre: Gangsta rap; crunk
- Length: 4:07
- Label: Jive
- Songwriters: Kejuan Muchita; Albert Johnson; Jonathan Smith
- Producer: Lil Jon

Mobb Deep singles chronology
"Got It Twisted" (2004)	"Real Gangstaz" (2004)	"Throw Your Hands (In the Air)" (2004)

Lil Jon singles chronology
"Culo" (2004)	"Real Gangstaz" (2004)	"Let's Go" (2004)

"Real Gangstaz" is the second single from Mobb Deep's album Amerikaz Nightmare, and is produced by and features Lil Jon. The video is a sequel to "Got It Twisted", the first single from the album.

== Track listing ==
Side A

1. "Real Gangstaz" [Dirty Version]
2. "Real Gangstaz" [Instrumental]

Side B

1. "Real Gangstaz" [Clean Version]
2. "Real Gangstaz" [Acappella]

== Charts ==
Chart (2004)	Peak position
US Hot R&B/Hip-Hop Songs (Billboard)	49

== Release history ==
Region	Date	Format(s)	Label(s)	Ref.
United States	August 16, 2004	Rhythmic contemporary · urban contemporary radio	Violator, Zomba	
