= Hidden Files =

Studio album by Havoc
- Released: February 24, 2009 (U.S.)
- Recorded: 2008–2009
- Genre: Hip hop
- Length: 44:36
- Label: Purfek Storm; Koch
- Producer: Havoc

Havoc chronology
The Kush (2007)	Hidden Files (2009)	13 (2013)

Singles from Hidden Files
- 1. "Watch Me" Released: January 26, 2009; 2. "Heart of the Grind" Released: February 11, 2009

Professional ratings
Review scores
Source	Rating
URB	3/5 stars
Critically Sound	(5.3/10)
HipHopDX	3/5 stars

Hidden Files is the second solo studio album by American recording artist Havoc, a half of the hip hop duo Mobb Deep. It was released on February 24, 2009, on Koch Records. The singles "Watch Me" and "Heart of the Grind" have been released.

Mobb Deep performs together on the song "On a Mission".

== Track listing ==
All tracks produced by Havoc

No.	Title	Length
1.	"Can't Get Touched"	2:36
2.	"I Clap 'Em Up"	3:42
3.	"Watch Me" (featuring Ricky Blaze)	3:15
4.	"Heart of the Grind"	2:57
5.	"You Treated Me" (featuring Cassidy)	2:58
6.	"My Life"	3:15
7.	"That's My Word"	3:42
8.	"The Hustler"	3:18
9.	"The Millennium"	3:12
10.	"Walk wit Me"	3:08
11.	"On a Mission" (performed by Mobb Deep)	3:37
12.	"This Is Where It's At" (featuring Big Noyd)	2:54
13.	"Don't Knock It 'Til You Try It"	3:11
14.	"Tell Me More" (featuring Sonyae Elise)	2:51
Total length:		44:36
