= Hoodlum (song) =

Single by Mobb Deep featuring Big Noyd and Rakim

from the album Hoodlum (soundtrack)
- Released: August 1997
- Genre: Hip hop
- Length: 4:15
- Label: Loud Records
- Songwriters: Havoc; Prodigy; Rakim; Big Noyd
- Producer: Mobb Deep

Mobb Deep singles chronology
"G.O.D. Pt. III" (1997)	"Hoodlum" (1997)	"Quiet Storm" (1999)

"Hoodlum" is a 1997 single by Mobb Deep. The song also features Big Noyd and Rakim. It was featured on the Hoodlum soundtrack.

== Track listing ==
Side A

1. "Hoodlum" (Main)
2. "Hoodlum" (Clean)

Side B

1. "Hoodlum" (Instrumental)
2. "Hoodlum" (Acapella)
