= The Safe Is Cracked =

Compilation album by Mobb Deep
- Released: April 7, 2009
- Recorded: 2004–2006
- Genre: Hip hop
- Label: Siccness
- Producer: Havoc; The Alchemist

Mobb Deep chronology
Blood Money (2006)	The Safe Is Cracked (2009)	Black Cocaine (2011)

Professional ratings
Review scores
Source	Rating
AllMusic	3.5/5 stars

The Safe Is Cracked is a compilation album by Mobb Deep, released April 7, 2009.

== Track listing ==
#	Title	Producer(s)	Performer(s)	Length
1	"Mobb Deep"	Havoc	Prodigy, DJ Envy	1:33
2	"Heat"	Havoc	Havoc, Prodigy	4:35
3	"Watch Ya Self"	Havoc	Havoc, Prodigy	3:32
4	"M.O.B."	Havoc	Havoc, Prodigy	3:13
5	"Can't Win 4 Losin'"	Havoc	Havoc, Prodigy	2:50
6	"Yea, Yea, Yea"	Havoc	Havoc, Prodigy	2:53
7	"That Crack"	Havoc	Havoc, Prodigy	2:50
8	"Infamous"	Havoc	Havoc, Prodigy	3:05
9	"What Goes On"	The Alchemist	Havoc, Prodigy	2:58
10	"Position"	Havoc	Havoc, Prodigy	3:02
11	"Get Out Our Way"	Havoc	Havoc, Prodigy	3:13
12	"You Wanna See Me Fall"	Havoc	Chinky, Havoc, Prodigy	3:06
13	"Don't Play"	Havoc	Big Noyd, Havoc, Prodigy	3:45
14	"Mobb Deep II"	Havoc	Prodigy, DJ Envy	1:20

== Charts ==
Chart (2009)	Peak position
US Top R&B/Hip-Hop Albums (Billboard)	68
