= Creep (Mobb Deep song) =

Single by Mobb Deep featuring 50 Cent

from the album Blood Money
- B-side: "It's Alright"
- Released: 2006
- Recorded: 2006
- Genre: Hip hop
- Length: 4:01
- Label: G-Unit/Interscope
- Songwriters: A. Johnson; K. Muchita; C. Jackson
- Producer: Havoc

Mobb Deep singles chronology
"Give It To Me" (2006)	"Creep" (2006)	"Dog Shit" (2011)

50 Cent singles chronology
"The Cake" (2006)	"Creep" (2006)	"You Don't Know" (2006)

"Creep" is the fourth and final single by rap duo Mobb Deep, from their album Blood Money. The song features 50 Cent but the video accompanied with it was made and was not released. The B-side of the single is "It's Alright", featuring Mary J. Blige and 50 Cent.

== Track listing ==
=== Side A ===
1. "Creep" (Clean Version)
2. "Creep" (Dirty Version)
3. "Creep" (Instrumental)

=== Side B ===
1. "It's Alright" (Clean Version)
2. "It's Alright" (Dirty Version)
3. "It's Alright" (Instrumental)
