= Quiet Storm (song) =

Single by Mobb Deep

from the album Murda Muzik and In Too Deep (soundtrack)
- Released: March 14, 1999; October 5, 1999 (remix)
- Recorded: 1997
- Genre: East Coast hip-hop; hardcore hip-hop
- Length: 4:24
- Label: Loud
- Songwriter(s): Albert Johnson; Kejuan Muchita; Melvin Glover; Kimberly Jones (remix)
- Producer(s): Havoc; Jonathan Williams (remix)

Mobb Deep singles chronology
"Hoodlum" (1997)	"Quiet Storm" (1999)	"It's Mine" (1999)

"Quiet Storm" is the first single from Mobb Deep's fourth album Murda Muzik. The song was originally released on the soundtrack for the film In Too Deep. The song features a sample of the bass line from the classic hip-hop song "White Lines (Don't Don't Do It)" by Melle Mel. In 2001, the R&B group 112 used an updated version of the "Quiet Storm" beat for their single, "It's Over Now".

A remix featuring Lil' Kim was released as the album's second single. The remix also became very popular and is noted to be one of Lil' Kim's most memorable guest appearances.

== Track listing ==
Side A

1. "Quiet Storm" [Dirty Version]
2. "Quiet Storm" [Instrumental]

Side B

1. "Quiet Storm" [Clean Version]
2. "Quiet Storm" [Acappella]

== Remix ==
A remix of "Quiet Storm" (co-produced by Jonathan "Lighty" Williams) was released shortly after the release of the single. The remix features Lil' Kim, who used her guest verse to diss rapper Foxy Brown. The B-side features the song "It's Mine", which was released as the next single from the album.

Throughout her career, Lil' Kim has performed the remix of "Quiet Storm" at various high-profile venues, including at Hot97's Hot for the Holidays concert and the 2019 BET Hip Hop Awards. Lil' Kim performs a dance routine during the chorus of the remix which has gone viral multiple times, and which has become known to many as the "Lil' Kim Dance."

=== Track listing ===
Side A

1. "Quiet Storm" (remix) (clean version)
2. "Quiet Storm" (remix) (dirty version)

Side B

1. "It's Mine" (clean version)
2. "It's Mine" (dirty version)

== Charts ==
=== Weekly charts ===
Chart (1999)	Peak position
US Hot R&B/Hip-Hop Songs (Billboard)	35
US Hot Rap Songs (Billboard)	17

=== Year-end charts ===
Chart (1999)	Position
US Hot R&B/Hip-Hop Songs (Billboard)	97
