= U.S.A. (Aiight Then) =

Single by Mobb Deep

from the album Murda Muzik
- Released: March 21, 2000
- Genre: Hip hop
- Length: 4:03
- Label: Loud
- Songwriter(s): Havoc; Prodigy
- Producer(s): Epitome, Shamello, Buddah

Mobb Deep singles chronology
"It's Mine" (1999)	"U.S.A." (2000)	"The Learning (Burn)" (2001)

"U.S.A. (Aiight Then)" is the third and final single from Mobb Deep's Murda Muzik album. The b-side features the song "Spread Love". The song was originally titled "Street Kingz" and featured a short verse by frequent collaborator Nas.

== Track listing ==
Side A

1. "U.S.A. (Aiight Then)" [Clean Version]
2. "U.S.A. (Aiight Then)" [Dirty Version]
3. "U.S.A. (Aiight Then)" [Instrumental]

Side B

1. "Spread Love" [Clean Version]
2. "Spread Love" [Dirty Version]
3. "Spread Love" [Instrumental]

== Charts ==
Chart (2000)	Peak position
Billboard Hot R&B/Hip-Hop Singles & Tracks	95
Billboard Hot Rap Tracks	36
