= Davina (R&B singer) =

American R&B singer and musician

- Born: Davina Bussey; March 18, 1965 (age 61)
- Origin: Detroit, Michigan, U.S.
- Genres: R&B; Hip Hop; House; Neo Soul
- Occupations: Singer; musician; record producer; songwriter
- Years active: 1984-present
- Labels: Nocturnal Images, Loud Records, Soul Line Associates

Davina (born Davina Bussey) is an American R&B singer and musician.

She grew up in Detroit, Michigan, ran her own dance music label Record, and worked as a recording engineer before signing with Loud Records. Her 1997 single "So Good" became the theme song for the film Hoodlum. Raekwon of Wu-Tang Clan and Xzibit each appeared on remixed versions of the song. Her album Best of Both Worlds (1998) reached number 180 on the US Billboard 200 and number 34 on the US Top R&B/Hip-Hop Albums chart. Two of three singles released from the album charted on both the US Billboard Hot 100 and the US Hot R&B/Hip-Hop Songs charts.

== Discography ==
=== Albums ===
Year	Title	Chart positions	
Year	Title	US	US R&B/HH
1998	Best of Both Worlds: Released: April 7, 1998; Label: Loud / RCA	180	34
2007	Return to Soul Vol 1: Released: June 29 or December 16, 2007; Label: Soul line Associates	—	—

=== Singles ===
- "Build Me Up (Buttercup)", 1984
- "Can't Stop Rockin'", 1984
- "Rock, Shake And Roll", 1986
- "If You're Single", 1987
- "Don't You Want It", 1992
- "Love & Happiness EP", 1993
- "Let Me Be Me", 1993
- "So Good", 1997
- "Come Over to My Place", 1998
- "I Can't Help It", 1998
- "Sweet Thang", 2017
