= It's Mine =

1999 single by Mobb Deep

Single by Mobb Deep featuring Nas

from the album Murda Muzik
- Released: August 31, 1999
- Recorded: July 1996
- Studio: Quad Studios
- Genre: East Coast hip hop
- Length: 4:23
- Label: Loud
- Songwriters: Nasir Jones; Kejuan Muchita; Albert Johnson; LaShawn Daniels; Rodney Jerkins; Fred Jerkins III; Japhe Tejeda; Brandy Norwood
- Producers: Havoc; Prodigy

Mobb Deep singles chronology
"Quiet Storm" (1999)	"It's Mine" (1999)	"U.S.A. (Aiight Then)" (2000)

Nas singles chronology
"Did You Ever Think" (1999)	"It's Mine" (1999)	"Nastradamus" (1999)

"It's Mine" is a song performed by American hip hop duo Mobb Deep for their fourth studio album Murda Muzik (1999). The song features guest vocals from friend and fellow Queensbridge artist Nas.

The song's instrumental is based on a sample of the title theme of the 1983 film Scarface (credited as "Scarface Cues") which was composed by Giorgio Moroder. This is the second time that Mobb Deep used music from the film for one of their singles, with the first being "G.O.D. Pt. III".

The chorus of the song is also both a lyrical and instrumental interpolation of the 1998 song by female R&B singers Brandy and Monica, "The Boy Is Mine". The original Brandy and Monica lyrics were "You need to give it up/Had about enough/It's not hard to see/The boy is mine". Where the chorus in "It's Mine" (sung by Nas) goes "Y'all need to give it up/We don't give a fuck/What y'all niggas want/Thug life is mine".

The video was directed by Hype Williams.

== Track listing ==
Side A

1. "It's Mine" [Dirty version]
2. "It's Mine" [Instrumental]

Side B

1. "It's Mine" [Clean version]
2. "It's Mine" [Acappella]

== Charts ==
Chart (2000)	Peak position
Billboard Hot R&B/Hip-Hop Singles & Tracks	71
Billboard Hot Rap Tracks	25
