= Back at You =

Single by Mobb Deep

from the album Sunset Park Original Motion Picture Soundtrack
- Released: March 21, 1996
- Genre: East coast hip hop
- Length: 3:43
- Label: EastWest Records America
- Songwriters: Havoc; Prodigy; Burt Bacharach; Hal David
- Producer: Havoc

Mobb Deep singles chronology
"Still Shinin'" (1996)	"Back at You" (1996)	"Drop a Gem on 'em" (1996)

"Back at You" is a 1996 single by hip-hop duo Mobb Deep. The song was featured on the soundtrack album for the film Sunset Park. The b-side featured another song from the film's soundtrack, "Elements I'm Among" by Queen Latifah.

== Track listing ==
Side A

1. Mobb Deep - Back at You (Soundtrack Version - Clean)
2. Mobb Deep - Back at You (Soundtrack Version)
3. Mobb Deep - Back at You (Instrumental)

Side B

1. Queen Latifah - Elements I'm Among (Soundtrack Version - Clean)
2. Queen Latifah - Elements I'm Among (Soundtrack Version)
3. Queen Latifah - Elements I'm Among (Instrumental)
