= Hey Luv (Anything) =

Single by Mobb Deep featuring 112

from the album Infamy
- Released: January 2002
- Genre: Hip hop, R&B
- Length: 3:57
- Label: Loud
- Songwriters: 112; Havoc; Prodigy
- Producer: Havoc

Mobb Deep singles chronology
| "The Learning (Burn)" (2001) | "Hey Luv (Anything)" (2002) | "Get Away" (2002) |

112 singles chronology
| "Dance with Me" (2001) | "Hey Luv (Anything)" (2002) | "Na Na Na Na" (2003) |

"Hey Luv (Anything)" is the second single from Mobb Deep's Infamy album. The song features 112 & the music video was directed by Little X. This song is also included on the B-side of "Get Away", the group's next single. It is Mobb Deep's highest charting song to date, peaking at #58 on the Billboard Hot 100.

== Track listing ==
Side A

1. "Hey Luv (Anything)" [Clean Version]

Side B

1. "Hey Luv (Anything)" [Dirty Version]
2. "Hey Luv (Anything)" [Instrumental]

== Charts ==
=== Weekly charts ===
| Chart (2002) | Peak position |
|---|---|
| US Billboard Hot 100 | 58 |
| US Hot R&B/Hip-Hop Songs (Billboard) | 32 |
| US Rhythmic Airplay (Billboard) | 15 |

=== Year-end charts ===
| Chart (2002) | Position |
|---|---|
| US Hot R&B/Hip-Hop Songs (Billboard) | 86 |
