= Murda Muzik =

1999 studio album by Mobb Deep

Studio album by Mobb Deep
- Released: August 17, 1999
- Genres: East Coast hip-hop; hardcore hip-hop; gangsta rap; dirty rap
- Length: 72:26
- Labels: Columbia; Loud; Violator
- Producers: Mobb Deep (exec.); Jonathan "Lighty" Williams (exec.); Baby Chris (exec.); Buddah; Epitome; Havoc; Shamello; T-Mix; The Alchemist

Mobb Deep chronology
Hell On Earth (1996)	Murda Muzik (1999)	Infamy (2001)

Singles from Murda Muzik
- 1. "Quiet Storm" Released: March 14, 1999; 2. "It's Mine" Released: August 31, 1999; 3. "U.S.A. (Aiight Then)" Released: March 21, 2000

Murda Muzik is the fourth studio album by American hip-hop duo Mobb Deep, which was released on August 17, 1999, through Columbia Records and Loud Records. It features one of the group's best-known tracks, "Quiet Storm." It is also the duo's most commercially successful album to date, for shipping over 1 million copies in the United States and was certified Platinum by the RIAA on October 26, 1999, debuting at No. 3 on the Billboard 200 charts. Murda Muzik garnered mostly positive reviews from music critics. A censored version of the album, titled Mobb Muzik, was released simultaneously. As of March 23, 2025 the album has sold over 2.8 million copies in the U.S.

== Background ==
The release of Murda Muzik was originally planned for the beginning of 1999, but Loud Records switched distributors from RCA to Columbia. Murda Muzik was shelved until this deal was finalized. Within this time the album was heavily bootlegged and Mobb Deep had to record new songs to make sure fans would still buy the album. The duo recorded 5 new songs, which replaced tracks which were previously recorded:

- "Spread Love"
- "I'm Going Out" (featuring Lil' Cease)
- "Can't Fuck Wit" (featuring Raekwon)
- "It's Mine" (featuring Nas)
- "Quiet Storm (Remix)" (featuring Lil' Kim)

=== Bootleg tracks ===
Murda Muzik leaked in early 1999. The following tracks were on multiple bootlegs that didn't make the final cut.

Full tracks:

- "Feel My Gat Blow"
- "Thrill Me" (featuring Big Noyd)
- "3 the Hard Way" (featuring Big Noyd), also called "You Fuckin’ Wit" and "3 From NYC"
- "This One" (featuring Big Noyd), also called "Pyramid Points"
- "Perfect Plot" (featuring Big Noyd), also called "Mobb Coming Thru" and "We Got The Drop"
- "Pile Raps, also called "Power Rap"
- "Nobody Likes Me"
- "Shiesty" (featuring Big Noyd), also called "Fuck That Bitch"
- "QB Meets Southside" (featuring Sticky Fingaz and X1)

Original versions of retail tracks:

- "Deer Park" (featuring Cormega) ("What's Ya Poison" with intro), also called "How You Want It"
- "Let a Ho Be a Ho" with intro
- "Streets Raised Me (OG Mix)", also called "That True Shit", with a different sounding hook.
- "Street Kingz" (featuring Nas) is "U.S.A. (Aiight Then)" with a Nas verse. Columbia didn't want to clear Nas for two songs. They had to cut his verse from "U.S.A. (Aiight then)" since he also appears on the song "It's Mine".
- "White Lines" ("Quiet Storm" without Havoc on the hook). Prodigy talked in between verses, it was mastered in a way that this talking sounded like it came out of a megaphone.
- "Thug Muzik", has a verse of Mike Delorean from Bars & Hooks instead of Prodigy.
- "Murda Muzik", longer track with a final verse from Prodigy that ultimately ended up on "Thug Muzik" in the retail release. There's also a version without that final verse but a freestyle from Cormega instead.

=== Promotion ===
The duo toured on the Family Values Tour for the album. Appearing on the second edition in 1999 with other nu metal, hip-hop and rap rock acts at the time, they supported the first half of the tour; appearing on the first 12 dates alongside headliners Limp Bizkit with support from Filter, Staind, The Crystal Method, Run-DMC, Korn from September 21st to October 8th.

== Critical reception ==
Professional ratings
Review scores
Source	Rating
AllMusic	3.5/5 stars
Entertainment Weekly	C+
NME	8/10
RapReviews	8.5/10
Rolling Stone	3.5/5 stars
The Source	4.5/5 stars
Spin	8/10
The Village Voice	B−

Murda Muzik received generally positive reviews from music critics. Joe Gross of Spin commented, "Balancing somber elegy and hardened battle verses is the essence of ruffneck hip-hop art, and nobody writes 'em fiercer than the Mobb". NME praised Havoc's "redemptive, soul-tinged beats" which gave "breathing space from the otherwise suffocatingly grim atmosphere", concluding that the album is "more radical, more challenging, than much of the so-called avant-garde music scene". Reviewing the original (bootlegged) version of the album, The Source's Carlito Rodriguez stated, "despite the almost insurmountable odds against MCs improving upon already monumental material, Hav and P have done it again", and also commended Prodigy for his introspective lyrics. Tom Sinclair of Entertainment Weekly called Mobb Deep "too damn serious for their own good", however, he conceded that "Taken individually, a few of the tracks on Murda Muzik have a somber power". In his consumer guide for The Village Voice, Robert Christgau gave the album a B− rating in his annual "Turkey Shoot", indicating "a bad record of some general import".

In a retrospective review, AllMusic's M.F. DiBella regarded Murda Muzik as "an arguable masterpiece in the Puffy and Master P era", and also praised Havoc for achieving "a high level of mastery in his production efforts, a truly signature style of deep bass grooves, piercing organs, ice-cold snare pops, melodic samples, and haunting orchestral snippets". Writing in The New Rolling Stone Album Guide, critic Chris Ryan stated, "With its deluded dreams of Mafia invincibility, Murda Muzik is only decent".

== Track listing ==
Credits adapted from the album's liner notes.

No.	Title	Writer(s)	Producer(s)	Length
1.	"Intro"			0:44
2.	"Streets Raised Me" (featuring Big Noyd & Chinky)	Kejuan Muchita; Albert Johnson; Tajuan Perry; Shalene Evans	Havoc	4:33
3.	"What's Ya Poison" (featuring Cormega)	Muchita; Johnson; Cory McKay	Havoc	3:45
4.	"Spread Love"	Muchita; Johnson	Havoc	4:04
5.	"Let a Ho Be a Ho"	Muchita	Havoc	3:35
6.	"I'm Going Out" (featuring Lil' Cease)	Muchita; Johnson; James Lloyd	Havoc	3:45
7.	"Allustrious" (previously featured on The Corruptor soundtrack)	Muchita; Johnson	Havoc	4:09
8.	"Adrenaline"	Muchita; Johnson	Havoc	4:42
9.	"Where Ya From" (featuring 8Ball)	Premro Smith; Triston Jones; Muchita; Johnson	T-Mix	4:02
10.	"Quiet Storm"	Muchita; Johnson; Melvin Glover; Sylvia Robinson	Havoc	4:25
11.	"Where Ya Heart At"	Muchita; Johnson; Sade Adu; Stuart Matthewman; Andrew Hale	Havoc	4:27
12.	"Noyd Interlude"			0:19
13.	"Can't Fuck Wit" (featuring Raekwon)	Muchita; Johnson; Corey Woods	Havoc	4:12
14.	"Thug Muzik" (featuring Infamous Mobb & Chinky)	Alan Maman; James Chandler; Lionel Cooper; Jamal Raheem; Evans	The Alchemist	4:34
15.	"Murda Muzik"	Muchita; Johnson	Havoc	4:11
16.	"The Realest" (featuring Kool G Rap)	Maman; Muchita; Johnson; Nathaniel Wilson; Barbara Gaskins	The Alchemist	4:27
17.	"U.S.A. (Aiight Then)"	Robert Taylor; Muchita; Johnson	Epitome; Shamello; Buddah	4:04
18.	"It's Mine" (featuring Nas)	Muchita; Johnson; Nasir Jones	Havoc	4:24
19.	"Quiet Storm (Remix)" (featuring Lil' Kim)	Muchita; Johnson; Kimberly Jones; Glover; Robinson	Havoc; Jonathan "Lighty" Williams	4:04

== Samples ==
Intro

- "Crime Inc. Theme" by Giles Swayne
- contains an excerpt from a speech of Ronald Reagan

Adrenaline

- "Ballad Of The Decomposing Man" by Steve Hackett

Where Ya Heart At

- "Fear" by Sade

It's Mine

- "The Boy Is Mine" by Brandy & Monica (interpolation)
- "Scarface Cues" by Giorgio Moroder

Quiet Storm

- "White Lines (Don't Do It)" by Grandmaster Melle Mel
- "A Quiet Storm" by Smokey Robinson

The Realest

- "Born to Lose You" by Ecstasy, Passion & Pain

I'm Going Out

- "Farewell" by Miklos Rozsa

Thug Muzik

- "The Toys" by George Winston and Meryl Streep

What's Ya Poison

- "1000 Rads" by David Axelrod

Where Ya From

- "The Champ" by The Mohawks

Quiet Storm (Remix)

- "10% Dis" by MC Lyte

== Charts ==
=== Weekly charts ===
Chart (1999)	Peak position
Canadian Albums (Billboard)	6
Dutch Albums (Album Top 100)	63
German Albums (Offizielle Top 100)	67
UK Albums (Official Charts)	81
UK R&B Albums (Official Charts)	16
US Billboard 200	3
US Top R&B/Hip-Hop Albums (Billboard)	2

=== Year-end charts ===
Chart (1999)	Position
US Billboard 200	136
US Top R&B/Hip-Hop Albums	46

== Certifications ==
Region	Certification	Certified units/sales
United States (RIAA)	Platinum	1,000,000^{^}
^{^} Shipments figures based on certification alone.
