= The Kush =

Studio album by Havoc
- Released: September 18, 2007
- Recorded: 2006–2007
- Genre: Hip-hop
- Label: Nature Sounds
- Producer: Havoc

Havoc chronology
The Kush (2007)	Hidden Files (2009)

Professional ratings
Review scores
Source	Rating
HipHopDX	2.5/5
Now	5/5 Ns
Pitchfork	5.1/10
PopMatters	6/10
RapReviews	6.5/10
XXL	3/5 (L)

Promotional poster for The Kush

The Kush is the debut solo studio album by American rapper and record producer Havoc. It was released on September 18, 2007, via Nature Sounds. The album was produced by Havoc, with Devin Horwitz serving as executive producer. It features guest appearances from Nyce da Future, Un Pacino, 40 Glocc, Ty Nitti, and Prodigy.

The album debuted at number 173 on the Billboard 200, number 31 on the Top R&B/Hip-Hop Albums, number 15 on the Top Rap Albums and number 5 on the Heatseekers Albums in the United States. It was supported with a single "I'm the Boss" b/w "Be There" and an accompanying music video for "I'm the Boss".

== Track listing ==
No.	Title	Length
1.	"NY 4 Life"	3:24
2.	"I'm the Boss"	2:39
3.	"By My Side" (featuring 40 Glocc)	3:01
4.	"One Less Nigga"	3:30
5.	"Ride Out" (featuring Nyce)	4:32
6.	"Balling Out" (featuring Un Pacino)	2:45
7.	"What's Poppin Tonite"	3:04
8.	"Class by Myself" (featuring Ty Nitty)	2:44
9.	"Set Me Free" (featuring Prodigy and Nyce)	4:52
10.	"Be There"	3:39
11.	"Hit Me Up" (featuring Un Pacino)	2:29
12.	"Get Off My Dick"	2:50

== Charts ==
Chart (2007)	Peak position
US Billboard 200	173
US Top R&B/Hip-Hop Albums (Billboard)	31
US Top Rap Albums (Billboard)	15
US Heatseekers Albums (Billboard)	5
