= 13 (Havoc album) =

Studio album by Havoc
- Released: May 7, 2013
- Recorded: 2012–2013
- Genre: Hip hop
- Length: 46:52
- Label: Nature Sounds
- Producers: Havoc (also exec.), Andrew Lloyd, FMG, Royce Music Group, Statik Selektah, Team Green Productions

Havoc chronology
Hidden Files (2009)	13 (2013)	13 Reloaded (2014)

Singles from 13
- 1. "Tell Me to My Face" Released: March 5, 2013; 2. "Gone" Released: March 5, 2013; 3. "Life We Chose" Released: April 16, 2013

13 is the third solo studio album by American rapper Havoc. The album was released on May 7, 2013 by Nature Sounds. The singles "Tell Me to My Face", "Gone" and "Life We Chose" have been released. The album features guest appearances from Styles P, Raekwon, Lloyd Banks, Masspike Miles, Royce da 5'9" and Twista.

== Background ==
During 2012, beef broke out between the hip hop group Mobb Deep. On April 9, 2012, Havoc sent out a slew of Twitter insults towards Prodigy. Havoc would later deny the messages being his, saying he had lost his phone. However, he would later confirm that the tweets did in fact come from himself, also saying that Mobb Deep was on hiatus indefinitely. This would result in a self-produced, diss track being released by Havoc titled, "Separated (Real from the Fake)". The song was originally set for 13. The feud would die down by the beginning of 2013 resulting in Mobb Deep reuniting for an international tour to celebrate the 20th anniversary of their debut album, Juvenile Hell.

Havoc chose the title because 13 is his lucky number. He describes the album as being characterized by his own unique sound, with some coloration added from music of the 1990s. "I wasn’t trying to go crazy just to sound different to get radio spins. People will hear some of that classic Mobb Deep sound and the features I have on the album pretty much sums that up," he commented.

== Guests and production ==
In January 2013 Havoc confirmed Royce da 5'9" as a guest on the album along with saying he has "many other dope guest appearances" on the album. Once the track list was released it revealed features from Styles P, Raekwon, Lloyd Banks, Twista and Masspike Miles. It is also the first Havoc solo album to not feature Mobb Deep comrade, Prodigy. The album was primarily produced by Havoc himself along with a couple minor co-producers on some of the tracks. Statik Selektah would also produce the album's bonus track.

== Release and promotion ==
On February 7, 2013 Havoc released an instrumental EP titled Beats Collection. On February 16, 2013 Havoc announced a release date for the album as May 7, 2013.

Following the album's release, starting May 9 through June 9, 2013 Mobb Deep toured the United States on their 20th Anniversary tour. Then they toured Europe from mid-June to the end of August 2013.

== Singles ==
In January 2013 Havoc announced the first single to be, "Tell Me to My Face" which features fellow rapper Royce da 5'9". The song was premiered on January 23 and released for digital download on March 5, 2013. It was produced by Havoc and co-produced by FMG. The second single "Gone" was released along with the lead single on March 5, 2013 also self-produced by Havoc. On March 20, 2013, the music video was released for "Gone".

On April 16, 2013, the third single "Life We Chose" featuring Lloyd Banks was released. On May 2, 2013, the music video was released for "Life We Chose" featuring Lloyd Banks. The remix was released on May 7, featuring the reunited Mobb Deep. On September 16, 2013, the music video was released for "Eyes Open" featuring Twista.

== Critical response ==
Professional ratings
Review scores
Source	Rating
AllMusic	4/5 stars
Exclaim!	(6/10)
HipHopDX	3/5 stars
XXL	(L)

Upon release 13 received generally positive reviews from music critics. At Metacritic, which assigns a normalized rating out of 100 to reviews from mainstream critics, the album received an average score of 72, based on 5 reviews. David Jeffries of AllMusic gave the album four out of five stars saying, "13 already feels more vital than anything the Mobb has done since Amerikaz Nightmare from 2004. Add the worthy single "Tell Me to My Face" with Royce da 5'9" and the ridiculously good, strange, and solid solo cut "Hear Dat" to the second half of the album and Havoc's solo effort seems like a cathartic kiss-off or kinetic gangster celebration.\" Ronald Grant of HipHopDX gave the album three out of five stars, saying "Appearances from kindred spirits such as Styles P, Raekwon, Royce Da 5’9 and Mysonne help add variety. But Havoc’s talents and willingness to experiment with his tried and true production formula can’t overcome the monotony of the subject matter in his rhymes."

Luke Fox of Exclaim! gave the album a six out of ten, saying "Even if you appreciate Havoc's reliability, you'll miss Prodigy's unpredictable diction. But as Hav and P (who also has a new disc on deck) squash their beef and celebrate the 20th anniversary of their '93 debut, Juvenile Hell, it's comforting to know a Mobb member can still churn out solid, steely-eyed murda music." Reed Jackson of XXL gave the album an L, saying "The project is another solid effort to add to the impressive Mobb Deep catalogue, even though it’s the first that doesn’t feature contributions from both MCs. Unfortunately, Hav never really digs that deep here, and the elephant in the room prevents him from taking that next step forward."

== Track listing ==
No.	Title	Writer(s)	Producer(s)	Length
1.	"Gone"	Kejuan Muchita	Havoc	3:28
2.	"Favorite Rap Stars" (featuring Styles P & Raekwon)	Muchita, David Styles, Corey Woods	Havoc	3:52
3.	"Life We Chose" (featuring Lloyd Banks)	Muchita, Christopher Lloyd	Havoc, FMG (co.)	3:33
4.	"Colder Days" (featuring Masspike Miles)	Muchita, Miles Wheeler	Havoc, FMG (co.)	5:06
5.	"Get Busy"	Muchita	Havoc	4:00
6.	"Eyes Open" (featuring Twista)	Muchita, Carl Mitchell	Havoc	4:37
7.	"Tell Me To My Face" (featuring Royce da 5'9")	Muchita, Ryan Montgomery	Havoc, FMG (co.)	3:57
8.	"This World" (featuring Masspike Miles)	Muchita, Wheeler	Royce Music Group	3:44
9.	"Already Tomorrow"	Muchita	Havoc	3:35
10.	"Hear Dat"	Muchita	Havoc	3:16
11.	"Gettin' Mines"	Muchita	Havoc, Andrew Lloyd, Team Green Productions	3:11
12.	"Long Road" (Outro)	Muchita	Havoc	1:23
13.	"Can't Sleep" (Bonus Track)	Muchita, Patrick Baril	Statik Selektah	3:09
Total length:				46:52

== Chart history ==
Chart (2013)	Peak position
US Billboard Top R&B/Hip-Hop Albums	44
