= Illustrious (album) =

Studio album by Big Noyd
- Released: January 22, 2008
- Recorded: 2007
- Genres: East Coast hip-hop; gangsta rap
- Length: 40:04
- Label: Koch
- Producers: Lil' Fame (exec.); Sebb; Fizzy Womack; Machavelli; Prince; Ric Rude; Street Radio; DJ Skizz; The Bad Parts; Blessiol

Big Noyd chronology
The Stickup Kid (2006)	Illustrious (2008)

Professional ratings
Review scores
Source	Rating
AllHipHop	7.5/10 stars
HipHopDX	2/5 stars
Rap4Fame	2.5/5 stars
DJBooth	3.5/5 stars

Illustrious is the fifth studio album by rapper Big Noyd, released on January 22, 2008. The album was executive produced by Lil' Fame of rap duo M.O.P. The first single released was "Things Done Changed", for which a video was shot.

This album is significant in the sense that it's the first Big Noyd album not to feature guest features or production from Mobb Deep on any songs.

== Track listing ==
No.	Title	Writer(s)	Producer(s)	Length
1.	"Snitches"	Perry	Sebb	3:19
2.	"Posted on the Block"	Grinnage; Perry; Perry	Fizzy Womack	3:10
3.	"So Much Trouble" (featuring Serani)	Marsh; Perry; Polo; Rogers	Machavelli; Prince	3:12
4.	"Heartless"	Alexander; Perry	Ric Rude	3:11
5.	"Money Talk"	Matthews; Perry; Smith	Street Radio	2:52
6.	"Things Done Changed" (featuring Kira)	Grinnage; Perry; Perry	Fizzy Womack	2:57
7.	"Back Up in This Bitch"	Grinnage; Perry; Perry	Fizzy Womack	2:52
8.	"The Paper" (featuring Jay Rush)	Jennings; Perry; Raemer	DJ Skizz	2:03
9.	"Ghetto" (featuring Joell Ortiz)	Alexander; Ortiz; Perry	Ric Rude	3:10
10.	"It's a Wrap"	Alexander; Perry; Polo; Rogers	Machavelli; Prince	2:55
11.	"Trying to Make it Out" (featuring 40 Glocc & B.A.M.)	Alexander; B.A.M.; Gastaway; Perry	Ric Rude	2:49
12.	"Nowhere Else to Hide"	Alexander; Perry	Ric Rude	3:19
13.	"Rags to Riches"	Grinnage; Perry; Perry	The Bad Parts; Fizzy Womack	2:56
14.	"Get it Poppin'"	Bradley; Perry	Blessiol	1:18
