= Episodes of a Hustla =

Studio album by Big Noyd
- Released: December 10, 1996
- Recorded: 1995–1996
- Genre: East Coast hip hop
- Length: 38:28
- Label: Tommy Boy; Warner Bros.
- Producer: Havoc; Charlemagne

Big Noyd chronology
Episodes of a Hustla (1996)	Only the Strong (2003)

Professional ratings
Review scores
Source	Rating
AllMusic	3/5 stars
Muzik	6/10
RapReviews	7/10

Episodes of a Hustla is the debut studio album by American rapper Big Noyd, released in December 10, 1996, by Tommy Boy Records. He recorded the album after making his name as a rapper on Mobb Deep's The Infamous and Hell on Earth albums. Most of the album was produced by Mobb Deep's Havoc and features guest appearances by Prodigy. Big Noyd's lyrics use violent, disturbing imagery to boast his rapping skills. Episodes of a Hustla charted at number 59 on the Top R&B/Hip-Hop Albums.

== Track listing ==
1. "It's on You" (prod. by Charlemange)
2. "The Precinct" (Interlude)
3. "Recognize & Realize (Part 1)" (feat. Prodigy) (prod. by Havoc)
4. "All Pro" (feat. Infamous Mobb and Mobb Deep) (prod. by Havoc)
5. "Infamous Mobb" (feat. Prodigy) (prod. by Havoc)
6. "Interrogation" (Interlude)
7. "Usual Suspect" (feat. Prodigy) (prod. by Havoc)
8. "Episodes of a Hustla" (feat. Prodigy) (prod. by Havoc)
9. "Recognize & Realize (Part 2)" (feat. Mobb Deep) (prod. by Havoc)
10. "I Don't Wanna Love Again" (After Six Entertainment Remix) (feat. Se'Kou)
11. "Usual Suspect (Stretch Armstrong Remix)" (feat. Prodigy)

== Personnel ==
- Ben Arrindell – Engineer, Mixing
- Carlos Bess – Engineer, Mixing
- Big Noyd – Primary Artist
- Charlemagne – Producer
- Havoc – Producer
- Isaac Hayes – Composer
- Kejuan Muchita – Composer
- Ty Nitty – Vocals (Background)
- Prodigy – Vocals (Background)
- Mario Rodriguez – Engineer
- Se'kou – Featured Artist
- G. Smith – Composer
- Twin – Vocals (Background)
- Michelle Willems – Art Direction
- Isaac Young – Composer
