= Special Edition (Infamous Mobb album) =

Studio album by Infamous Mobb
- Released: March 26, 2002
- Studio: Chung King Studios; In Ya Ear Studios; Soundtrack Studios; Othaz Recording Studio; D&D Studios; Battery Studios
- Genre: East Coast hip hop; gangsta rap
- Length: 1:01:42
- Label: IM³; Landspeed
- Producer: Alchemist; Ax The Bull; DJ Muggs; Havoc; Phil; Ronald "Gotti" Odum; Uno-Dos; V.I.C.

Infamous Mobb chronology
Special Edition (2002)	Blood Thicker Than Water, Vol. 1 (2004)

Professional ratings
Review scores
Source	Rating
AllMusic	4/5 stars

Special Edition is the debut studio album by American hip hop group Infamous Mobb. It was released on March 26, 2002, via IM³/Landspeed Records. Recording sessions took place at Chung King Studios, In Ya Ear Studios, Soundtrack Studios, Othaz Recording Studio, D&D Studios, and Battery Studios in New York. Production was handled by The Alchemist, Ax The Bull, Havoc, DJ Muggs, Phil, Ron Gotti, Uno-Dos and V.I.C. It features guest appearances from Mobb Deep, Chinky, Big Noyd, Blitz, Hostyle, Kaos, Ty Maxx, Uno-Dos and V-12. The album peaked at number 118 on the Billboard 200, number 19 on the Top R&B/Hip-Hop Albums, number 5 on the Independent Albums and number 2 on the Heatseekers Albums.

== Track listing ==
No.	Title	Writer(s)	Producer(s)	Length
1.	"Intro"		The Alchemist	1:12
2.	"IM³"	James Tyrone Chandler; Jamal Abdul Raheem; Lionel B. Cooper; Daniel Alan Maman	The Alchemist	4:46
3.	"Born Again" (featuring Hostyle)	Chandler; Raheem; Cooper; Joshua Lauria	Ax The Bull	3:54
4.	"Killa Queens" (featuring Prodigy and Big Noyd)	Chandler; Raheem; Cooper; Albert Johnson; Tajuan Perry; Victor Padilla	V.I.C.	4:01
5.	"Special Edition"	Chandler; Raheem; Cooper; Maman	The Alchemist	3:29
6.	"I Rep"	Chandler; Raheem; Cooper	Phil	2:41
7.	"The Family" (featuring Prodigy)		The Alchemist	0:40
8.	"Mobb Niggaz (The Sequel)" (featuring Prodigy)	Chandler; Raheem; Cooper; Johnson; Maman	The Alchemist	4:27
9.	"Reality Rap" (featuring Blitz, Kaos and Uno-Dos)	Chandler; Raheem; Cooper	Uno-Dos	5:09
10.	"Make a Livin'" (featuring Chinky and V-12)	Chandler; Raheem; Cooper; Shalene Evans	Ron Gotti	4:00
11.	"We Don't Give A..." (featuring Havoc)	Chandler; Raheem; Cooper	Havoc	3:54
12.	"Back in the Days" (featuring Chinky)	Chandler; Raheem; Cooper; Evans; Maman	The Alchemist	4:11
13.	"B.I.G. - T.W.I.N.S."		The Alchemist	3:04
14.	"We Strive" (featuring Ty Maxx)	Chandler; Raheem; Cooper; Maman	The Alchemist	4:39
15.	"We Will Survive" (featuring Chinky)	Cooper; Evans; Lawrence Muggerud	DJ Muggs	4:21
16.	"War / Get High Get Bent"	Chandler; Raheem; Cooper; Kejuan Muchita	Havoc; Ax The Bull	7:07
Total length:				1:01:42

== Personnel ==
- James "Ty Nitty" Chandler – performer (tracks: 1–6, 8–12, 14, 16)
- Jamal "Big Twins"/"Twin Gambino" Abdul Raheem – performer (tracks: 1–5, 8–14, 16)
- Lionel "G.O.D. Pt. III" Cooper – performer (tracks: 1–5, 8–12, 14–16)
- Fredrick "Hostyle" Ivey – performer (track 3)
- Albert "Prodigy" Johnson – performer (tracks: 4, 7, 8), executive producer
- TaJuan "Big Noyd" Perry – performer (track 4)
- Uno-Dos – performer & producer (track 9)
- Blitz – performer (track 9)
- Kaos – performer (track 9)
- Shalene "Chinky" Evans – performer (tracks: 10, 12, 15)
- Shaun "V-12" Walker – performer (track 10)
- Kejuan "Havoc" Muchita – performer (track 11), producer (tracks: 11, 16), executive producer
- Ty-Maxx – performer (track 14)
- Alan "The Alchemist" Maman – producer (tracks: 1, 2, 5, 7, 8, 12–14), executive producer
- Ax The Bull – producer (tracks: 3, 16)
- Victor "V.I.C." Padilla – producer (track 4)
- Phil – producer (track 6)
- Ronald "Ron Gotti" Odum – producer (track 10), executive producer
- Lawrence "DJ Muggs" Muggerud – producer & mixing (track 15)
- Steve Sola – mixing (tracks: 2, 4, 11, 16)
- Pablo – mixing (tracks: 3, 5, 6, 10, 16)
- Kieran Walsh – mixing (tracks: 8, 9, 12–14)
- Trevor "Karma" Gendron – art direction, design
- Ola Kudu – artwork
- David Corio – photography

== Charts ==
Chart performance for Special Edition
Chart (2002)	Peak position
US Billboard 200	118
US Top R&B/Hip-Hop Albums (Billboard)	19
US Independent Albums (Billboard)	5
US Heatseekers Albums (Billboard)	2
