= 13 Reloaded (album) =

Studio album by Havoc
- Released: November 18, 2014
- Recorded: 2013–2014
- Genre: Hip hop
- Length: 44:05
- Label: HClass
- Producer: Havoc (also exec.)

Havoc chronology
13 (2013)	13 Reloaded (2014)	The Silent Partner (2016)

13 Reloaded (alternatively titled Thirteen Reloaded) is the fourth solo studio album by American rapper Havoc, one-half of the hip hop duo Mobb Deep. The album was released on November 18, 2014 by Havoc's HClass Entertainment. The album features guest appearances from Prodigy, Sheek Louch, Cormega, Ferg Brim and Mysonne. Album artwork by John Katehis.

== Background ==
The album is the fourth solo album by Havoc, and serves as a continuation of the previous album, 13. According to Havoc, "Not many guest appearances, it's all about the production. It's an album for the fans of Havoc's sound," he says. The album was released on November 18, 2014.

== Track listing ==
All tracks produced by Havoc

No.	Title	Length
1.	"Best of the Best"	3:03
2.	"Not Yours"	2:50
3.	"Uncut Raw" (performed by Mobb Deep)	3:36
4.	"Don't Take It Personal"	3:07
5.	"What I Rep" (featuring Sheek Louch)	2:35
6.	"Dirty Calls"	2:38
7.	"What's Your Problem"	2:26
8.	"Listen to the Man"	2:45
9.	"Fallen Soldiers" (featuring Cormega)	3:33
10.	"Get Your Shit"	3:10
11.	"Outro (Top Seller)" (featuring Ferg Brim)	3:33
12.	"Tear Shit Up" (featuring Mysonne)	4:02
13.	"Champion Winner"	3:37
14.	"All I Know"	3:07
Total length:		44:05

== Reception ==
Above Average Hip-Hop stated "This album is a great listen for any real fan, and even new ones who are looking for some authentic street music."
