= Put Em in Their Place =

2006 single by Mobb Deep

Single by Mobb Deep

from the album Blood Money
- Released: March 14, 2006
- Genre: East Coast hip-hop
- Length: 4:01
- Label: G-Unit; Interscope
- Songwriters: Havoc; Prodigy
- Producers: Sha Money XL; Havoc; Ky Miller

Mobb Deep singles chronology
| "Have a Party" (2006) | "Put Em in Their Place" (2006) | "Give It to Me" (2006) |

"Put Em in Their Place" is the second single from Mobb Deep's Blood Money album. The song is produced by Havoc, Ky Miller, and Sha Money XL.

== Background ==
This song was featured on Entourage episode "Guys and Doll" when Johnny and Turtle invade Dom's room to look for the missing doll. The clean version of this song appeared on Prison Break episode called "Dirt Nap". A remix featuring Houston rapper Bun B later appeared on their 2008 mixtape More Money, More Murda.

Despite the album being criticized by fans, this song is one of the more well acclaimed tracks of the album.

This song is also featured in the video game Skate 3 (2010).

== Track listing ==
1. "Put Em in Their Place" [clean version]
2. "Put Em in Their Place" [dirty version]
3. "Put Em in Their Place" [instrumental]
4. "Put Em in Their Place" [a cappella]

== Charts ==
Chart performance for "Put Em in Their Place"
| Chart (2006) | Peak position |
|---|---|
| Australia (ARIA) | 60 |
| UK Singles (OCC) | 75 |
| UK Hip Hop/R&B (OCC) | 9 |
| US Billboard Hot R&B/Hip-Hop Songs | 59 |
