= Blood Money (Mobb Deep album) =

Studio album by Mobb Deep
- Released: May 2, 2006
- Recorded: 2005–2006
- Studio: Bass Clef Studios (Ozone Park, NY); Right Track Recording (New York, NY); LiveWire Remote Recorders (Toronto, ON); Digital Insight Recording Studios (Las Vegas, NV); Record Plant (Los Angeles, CA); Nate's Crib (Los Angeles, CA); Sound on Sound Studios (New York, NY); Record One (Los Angeles, CA)
- Genre: Hip-hop
- Length: 59:55
- Label: The Infamous; G-Unit; Interscope
- Producer: Alchemist; Chad Beatz; Exile; Havoc; J. R. Rotem; K-Lassik Beats; Keyon Harrold; Ky Miller; Product & Whitton; Profile; Sha Money XL; Dr. Dre; Fredwreck; Mike Elizondo

Mobb Deep chronology
Amerikaz Nightmare (2004)	Blood Money (2006)	The Infamous Mobb Deep (2014)

Singles from Blood Money
- 1. "Have a Party" Released: March 2, 2006; 2. "Put Em in Their Place" Released: March 14, 2006; 3. "Give It to Me" Released: May 2, 2006; 4. "Creep" Released: 2006

Blood Money is the seventh studio album by American hip-hop duo Mobb Deep. Originally scheduled for a March 21, 2006 release, it was released on May 2, 2006 via Prodigy's Infamous Records, 50 Cent's G-Unit Records and Jimmy Iovine's Interscope Records, making it their only studio album for the latter labels.

The recording sessions took place at Bass Clef Studios in Ozone Park, at Right Track Recording and Sound On Sound in New York, at LiveWire Remote Recorders in Toronto, at Digital Insight Recording Studios in Las Vegas, at Record Plant, Nate's Crib and Record One in Los Angeles. The album was produced by Havoc, Sha Money XL, Ky Miller, Chad Beatz, Exile, J. R. Rotem, K-Lassik Beats, Product & Whitton, Profile, and the Alchemist, as well as Dr. Dre, Fredwreck and Mike Elizondo, who produced bonus tracks. It features guest appearances from Mary J. Blige and G-Unit members 50 Cent, Lloyd Banks, Tony Yayo and Young Buck, with Nate Dogg on one of the bonus tracks.

The album was supported with singles and accompanying music videos for "Put Em in Their Place", "Give It to Me" and "Creep". Blood Money is the only Mobb Deep studio album to not feature their frequent collaborator Big Noyd.

== Background ==
Fellow Queens-bred rapper 50 Cent had a personal connection to Mobb Deep, with member Havoc providing production on G-Unit tracks, such as Lloyd Banks' "Ain't No Click", The Game's "Don't Need Your Love", and Tony Yayo's "Dear Suzie". In June 2005, Mobb Deep announced they had signed with G-Unit Records. The same year, under their new label, the duo were featured on the special edition of 50 Cent's The Massacre on the track "Outta Control (Remix)" and contributed to Get Rich or Die Tryin': Music from and Inspired by the Motion Picture, including the song "Have a Party".

They set to work on their new album, Blood Money, due March 21, 2006. It was re-scheduled for an April 11, 2006 release, but was postponed to finish sample clearance.

== Critical reception ==
Professional ratings
Aggregate scores
Source	Rating
Metacritic	55/100
Review scores
Source	Rating
AllMusic	2.5/5 stars
Blender	3.5/5 stars
Entertainment Weekly	A−
Now	3/5 Ns
Pitchfork	4.6/10
PopMatters	5/10
Spin	B
Stylus	D
USA Today	3/4 stars
XXL	4/5 (XL)

Blood Money was met with mixed or average reviews from music critics. At Metacritic, which assigns a normalized rating out of 100 to reviews from mainstream publications, the album received an average score of 55 based on seventeen reviews.

Margeaux Watson of Entertainment Weekly praised the album, calling it "the duo's finest body of work since their 1995 masterpiece, The Infamous". Noah Callahan-Bever, in a review for Vibe, expanded with "although there remains a sheen throughout, the body of the set showcases the Mobb in darker, more familiar territory". Sean Fennessey of Spin stated: "instead of the poppy makeover many anticipated, the Mobb's seventh album is a curious blend of gunz-money anthems, G-Unit-ized sex romps, and visions of the great beyond". Josh Eells of Blender found "their new boss's hooks are often slicker and less arresting than the minor-key grit they thrive on". Steve 'Flash' Juon of RapReviews resumed: "in terms of their long career of certified bangers it comes as a slight disappointment".

In mixed reviews, Jason Richards of Now saw "not surprisingly, the resulting cameo-plugged record sounds more like a G-Unit album than an Infamous one". AllMusic's Andy Kellman stated: "the flashes of brilliance that were once routinely delivered by Havoc and Prodigy are few and fleeting here". Quentin B Huff of PopMatters wrote: "if Mobb Deep didn't have their own history, their own discography, and their own mythos, contributions from 50 and friends wouldn't be a hindrance. But here, those contributions become intrusions that keep the Mobb from telling their own stories, flashing their own green, getting their own groupies". Tom Breihan of Pitchfork found "too much of Blood Money represents something sad and fascinating-- two demons domesticated, two artists who have willfully transformed themselves into hucksters". Azeem Ahmad of musicOMH concluded: "the album is a 60 minute blur, and while there are brief moments of clarity there's just nothing special about Blood Money".

In negative reviews, Ian Cohen of Stylus Magazine reported that "it's hard to imagine another album in 2006 doing a worse job of justifying its existence than Blood Money".

== Commercial performance ==
In the United States, the album debuted at number three on the Billboard 200 and number-one on the Top Rap Albums charts with 106,000 copies sold in its first week of release. As of August 2006, Blood Money had sold 250,000 copies in the US. In his 2012 autobiography titled My Infamous Life, Prodigy claims the album went gold.

== Track listing ==
No.	Title	Writer(s)	Producer(s)	Length
1.	"Smoke It"	Albert Johnson; Kejuan Muchita; Michael Clervoix; Derick Prosper	Havoc; Sha Money XL (add.)	2:57
2.	"Put Em in Their Place"	Johnson; Muchita; Clervoix; Kyerne Miller	Havoc; Sha Money XL; Ky Miller	4:00
3.	"Stole Something" (featuring Lloyd Banks)	Johnson; Muchita; Christopher Lloyd; Micky Jones	Havoc	3:57
4.	"Creep" (featuring 50 Cent)	Johnson; Muchita; Curtis Jackson; Ramesh Pant; Bappi Lahiri	Havoc	4:01
5.	"Speaking So Freely"	Johnson; Muchita; Hans Ehrlinger; Gunter Greffenius; Gerhard Narholz	Havoc	3:11
6.	"Backstage Pass"	Johnson; Muchita; Keyon Harrold	K-Lassik Beats	3:05
7.	"Give It to Me" (featuring Young Buck)	Johnson; Muchita; David Brown; Jackson; M. Castro; N. Lewis; J. Antoine; Jatin–Lalit; Anjaan Sameer	Profile	3:08
8.	"Click Click" (featuring Tony Yayo)	Johnson; Muchita; Marvin Bernard; Stu Phillips; Glen A. Larson	Havoc	4:25
9.	"Pearly Gates" (featuring 50 Cent)	Johnson; Muchita; Jackson; Alex Manfredi; Robert Bowles	Exile	4:16
10.	"Capital P, Capital H"	Johnson; Muchita; Clint Richmond; Johnathon Whitton	Product & Whitton	4:15
11.	"Daydreamin'"	Johnson; Muchita; Chad Dexter Burnette; Clervoix	Chad Beatz	3:15
12.	"The Infamous" (featuring 50 Cent)	Johnson; Muchita; Alan Maman; Fred Brathwaite	The Alchemist	3:53
13.	"In Love with the Moula"	Johnson; Muchita; Jonathan Rotem	J. R. Rotem	3:13
14.	"It's Alright" (featuring 50 Cent and Mary J. Blige)	Johnson; Muchita; Jackson; Mary J. Blige; Willie Harris; Wayne Henderson; Gregory Matta	Havoc	4:25

Bonus tracks
No.	Title	Writer(s)	Producer(s)	Length
15.	"Have a Party" (featuring 50 Cent and Nate Dogg)	Johnson; Muchita; Jackson; Nathaniel Hale; Farid Nassar	Fredwreck	3:56
16.	"Outta Control (Remix)" (featuring 50 Cent)	Johnson; Muchita; Jackson; Andre Young; Michael Elizondo; Mark Batson; Che Pope	Dr. Dre; Mike Elizondo	4:07
Total length:				59:55

Exclusive bonus track
No.	Title	Writer(s)	Producer(s)	Length
17.	"So Ill"	Johnson; Muchita; Miller	Ky Miller	3:02

Sample credits

- Track 3 contains samples from "Puella Puella" by Man.
- Track 4 contains samples from "Dil Tha Akela Akela" by Lata Mangeshkar.
- Track 5 contains samples from "Solitude of the Mountains" by Gil Flat.
- Track 7 contains samples from "Tujhe Yaad Na Meri AA Yee" by Jatin–Lalit.
- Track 8 contains samples from the Knight Rider theme.
- Track 9 contains samples from "The Judgement Day" by Tavares.
- Track 12 contains samples from "Gangbusters" written by Fab Five Freddy with scratch mix by Grand Wizzard Theodore.
- Track 14 contains samples from "The Loneliest Man in Town" by Side Effect.
- Track 15 contains samples from "I Love Rock 'n' Roll" by Joan Jett and the Blackhearts.

== Charts ==
=== Weekly charts ===
Chart (2006)	Peak position
Australian Albums (ARIA)	81
Belgian Albums (Ultratop Wallonia)	90
Canadian Albums (Billboard)	6
French Albums (SNEP)	37
German Albums (Offizielle Top 100)	38
Scottish Albums (OCC)	90
Swiss Albums (Schweizer Hitparade)	42
UK Albums (OCC)	70
UK Album Downloads (OCC)	96
UK R&B Albums (OCC)	6
US Billboard 200	3
US Top R&B/Hip-Hop Albums (Billboard)	1
US Top Rap Albums (Billboard)	1

=== Year-end charts ===
Chart (2006)	Position
US Top R&B/Hip-Hop Albums (Billboard)	71

== See also ==
- List of Billboard number-one R&B/hip-hop albums of 2006
