= Infamous Mobb =

American hip hop group

- Origin: New York City, U.S.
- Genres: Hip hop; East Coast hip hop; hardcore hip hop
- Years active: 1994–present
- Labels: IM3
- Members: Godfather Pt. III; Ty Nitty; Twin Gambino (aka Big Twins)
- Past members: Twin Scarface (deceased)

Infamous Mobb, also known as IM3, is an American hip hop group from Queensbridge, Queens, New York, composed of members Ty Nitty, Twin Gambino aka Big Twin and G.O.D. Part III aka Godfather Part III. They are an integral part of the Queensbridge hip-hop scene, which includes rappers like Nas, Mobb Deep, Cormega, Capone, and Tragedy Khadafi.

== History ==
Friends since childhood, the Infamous Mobb members all grew up on Queensbridge's 41st side 12th Street. Gambino and Scarface were twin brothers; Twin Scarface died in a car crash in late 1996 caused by fellow member Godfather. The only known track released that Scarface appeared on is "All Pro" on Big Noyd's debut album Episodes of a Hustla. Gotti briefly rapped with them but decided to become a Producer and Manager for the group.

Infamous Mobb first appeared in 1994 on Mobb Deep's Demo Cuts mixtape for their 1995 album, The Infamous. On the final Album Ty Nitty appeared on "Party's Over", in the third verse along with Big Noyd although the other members were only included in the prelude skits.

They next appeared rapping on Big Noyd's debut album Episodes of a Hustla and Mobb Deep's following 1996 album Hell on Earth. They also appeared on Murda Muzik and Infamy, as well as many mixtapes. The group also appeared on Nas' QB Finest compilation album as well as DJ Muggs's first Soul Assassins album.

Their debut album, Special Edition, was not released until 2002; it features extensive production by The Alchemist. The album was released on Infamous Mobb's own IM3 label and distributed by Landspeed Records.

In 2004, the group released Blood Thicker Than Water Vol. 1. This album was also released on the IM3 label, but this time through Monopolee Records. A second version of the album was released which included a bonus DVD. The DVD includes Infamous Mobb music videos as well as in-depth interviews with some of the group's Queensbridge affiliates.

There is some confusion among fans and media about the similar names of Infamous Mobb and Mobb Deep. Both groups are from Queensbridge; Mobb Deep released an album in 1995 titled The Infamous, and Infamous Mobb debuted on Mobb Deep's following album, Hell on Earth. Given the similar themes present in their artistic output, the social links between the groups, and their mutual collaboration on projects, it is safe to say that the Infamous Mobb crew is an extension of the Mobb Deep duo.

In 2007 Infamous Mobb split to work on their solo careers. In 2008 Twin Gambino changed his stage name to Big Twin. In 2009 they did a collaboration track with the Italian rap group Club Dogo on their album Dogocrazia. The track was called "Infamous Gang".

In 2011, Ty Nitty left the group (and cut ties with Mobb Deep) and launched his own label 'Love and Loyalty' records with his business partner Vinny Thunn. A public dispute between him and Prodigy of Mobb Deep erupted after Prodigy included Ty Nitty in the account of a confrontation between Mobb Deep, Infamous Mobb and Capone-N-Noreaga in P's autobiography 'My Infamous Life.'

On May 14, 2020, Infamous Mobb released 2 new singles "Like a Dream" and "Queens get the Money".

== Discography ==
=== Albums ===
- 2002: Special Edition
- 2004: Blood Thicker Than Water: Volume 1
- 2007: Reality Rap

=== Mixtapes ===
- 2010: "2010: The Year of the Dragon"

=== Singles ===
- 1997: "Life Is Tragic"
- 2002: "Mobb Niggaz (The Sequel)" (Feat. Prodigy)
- 2002: "IM³"
- 2002: "We Will Survive" (Feat. Chinky)
- 2004: "Empty Out (Reload)" (Feat. Prodigy)
- 2004: "Who We Ride For"
- 2007: "Pull the Plug" (Feat. Prodigy)
- 2007: "Capital Q"
- 2007: "Betti Bye Bye" (Feat. Flame Killer)
- 2020: "Like A Dream"
- 2020: "Queens Get The Money"

=== Solo albums ===
- 2009: Big Twins – The Project Kid
- 2009: Big Twins – The Infamous QB: EP
- 2011: Blaq Mobb (Godfather: Pt. III & Flame Killer) – Infamous Legacy (Queensbridge to Worldwide)
- 2011: Blaq Mobb (Godfather: Pt. III & Flame Killer) – Blaq Diamondz
- 2011: Ty Nitty – My Loyal Life
- 2011: Godfather: Pt. III – Medicine Man
- 2012: Big Twins – The Infamous QB: Still Cooking
- 2013: Ty Nitty – Tuff Love
- 2013: Big Twins – The Infamous QB: On the Grill
- 2018: Big Twins – Grimey Life

=== Solo mixtapes ===
- 2005: Godfather: Pt. III – God's Advocate
- 2006: Ty Nitty – Anthrax Music: Vol. 1
- 2006: Big Twins – The Grimey One: Vol. 1
- 2008: Big Twins – The Grimey Collection
- 2008: Ty Nitty – Nitty Filez I
- 2008: Godfather: Pt. III – The Infamous Dunn
- 2008: Ty Nitty – Tsunami
- 2008: Godfather Pt. III & Shuteye – Creeperz: Pt. 1 (NMEwreckidz)
- 2009: Blaq Mobb (Godfather: Pt. III & Flame Killer) – QB to South Side
- 2009: Ty Nitty & NE dubz – Creeperz pt 4 (NMEwreckidz)
- 2009: Ty Nitty – Nitty Filez II
- 2010: Ty Nitty – International Ty
- 2010: Godfather: Pt. III & Ty Nitty – Hip-Hop Vultures
- 2010: Blaq Mobb (Godfather: Pt. III & Flame Killer) – Blaq Diamondz
- 2010: Ty Nitty – Code of the Block
- 2010: Ty Nitty – Avatar Ty Nitty
- 2010: Ty Nitty – Animal Instinct
- 2010: Ty Nitty – Nitty Filez III
- 2011: Big Twins & B.A.R.G.E. - French Queensbridge
- 2011: Ty Nitty & Rain – London 2 Qb
- 2012: Ty Nitty – Nitty Filez IV
- 2013: Big Twins – Thrive
- 2013: Big Twins – TG1
- 2014: Big Twins – Thrive 2
- 2016: Big Twins – TNT (with Twizz The Beat Pro)
