= Big Noyd =

American rapper (born 1975)

- Perry performing in 2026

Background information
- Born: TaJuan Akeem Perry; August 15, 1975 (age 51)
- Origin: New York City, U.S.
- Genres: East Coast hip hop; hardcore hip hop
- Years active: 1993–present
- Label: Infamous

TaJuan Akeem Perry (born August 15, 1975), better known by his stage name Big Noyd, is an American rapper. He is closely affiliated with Mobb Deep and is featured on all of their albums except Blood Money.

== Career ==
Big Noyd's debut was his verse on "Stomp 'Em Out" from Mobb Deep's 1993 debut Juvenile Hell, but it was not until 1995, on Mobb Deep's album The Infamous, that Big Noyd attracted wider attention. He appeared on "Right Back At You", “Party Over”, & "Give Up the Goods (Just Step)". He explained later that he received his first contract, for $300,000, from Tommy Boy because of his verse on "Give Up The Goods (Just Step)".

His debut album Episodes Of A Hustla was released in 1996 on Tommy Boy Records. Noyd was incarcerated at the time of its release. According to Prodigy, the album sold a "disappointing 30,000 copies". In 2000, Big Noyd signed to Prodigy's record label, Infamous Records, and appeared on the songs Infamous Minded and Gun Play from Prodigy's debut studio album, H.N.I.C., which was certified Gold by the RIAA.

In 2003, Big Noyd returned with his second album, Only The Strong. This album, just as his debut, had many Mobb Deep-related features. Noyd attributes the lackluster sales to Landspeed Records' (which became Traffic Entertainment Group) filing for bankruptcy in an unrelated lawsuit just as the album was being released. In 2004, Big Noyd released his third album, On the Grind, also featuring many guest-spots by Mobb Deep-related artists. The album was released independently through Monopolee Records, which Noyd helped to found and released under his full control, preventing issues that happened with Landspeed and Tommy Boy Records. He founded Noyd Inc. in 2007.

He got his rap name from a friend who thought he resembled Domino's Pizzas advertising character 'The Noid'.

== Personal life ==
He is of Puerto Rican and African American descent. He has a daughter who still lives in Queensbridge, Queens.

== Discography ==
Year	Title	Chart positions		
Year	Title	US R&B/HH	US Indie	US Heat
1996	Episodes of a Hustla: Released: December 10, 1996; Label: Tommy Boy Records	59	—	—
2003	Only the Strong: Released: September 23, 2003; Label: Landspeed Records	45	27	36
2005	On the Grind: Released: January 25, 2005; Label: Monopolee Records	—	—	—
2006	The Stick Up Kid: Released: August 22, 2006; Label: Traffic Entertainment Group	—	—	—
2008	Illustrious: Released: January 22, 2008; Label: Koch Records	—	44	13
2008	Street Kings: Released: September 23, 2008; Label: Noyd Inc.	—	—	—
2010	Queens Chronicle: Released: February 2, 2010; Label: Noyd Inc.	—	—	—
