= Kool G Rap discography =

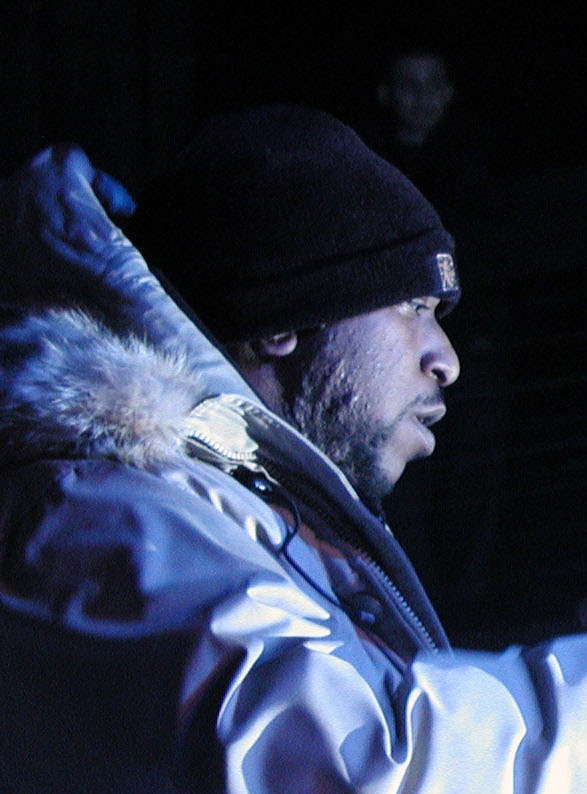
- Kool G Rap performing in New York City, 2006.
- Studio albums: 9
- EPs: 1
- Compilation albums: 5
- Singles: 30
- Music videos: 13
- Collaborative albums: 2
- Mixtapes: 4
- Guest appearances: 81

The discography of American rapper Kool G Rap consists of 9 studio albums, two collaborative albums, one EP, and thirty singles.

== Albums ==
=== Studio albums ===
List of studio albums, with selected chart positions
| Title | Album details | Peak chart positions | |
| Title | Album details | US | US R&B |
|---|---|---|---|
| Road to the Riches (with DJ Polo) | Released: March 14, 1989; Label: Cold Chillin', Warner Bros.; Format: CD, CS, LP | — | 26 |
| Wanted: Dead or Alive (with DJ Polo) | Released: August 13, 1990; Label: Cold Chillin', Warner Bros.; Format: CD, CS, LP | — | 34 |
| Live and Let Die (with DJ Polo) | Released: November 24, 1992; Label: Cold Chillin'; Format: CD, CS, LP | 185 | 18 |
| 4,5,6 | Released: September 12, 1995; Label: Cold Chillin', Epic, Sony; Format: CD, CS, LP | 24 | 1 |
| Roots of Evil | Released: October 20, 1998; Label: Illstreet, Downlow; Format: CD, CS, LP | — | 43 |
| The Giancana Story | Released: November 26, 2002; Label: Koch; Format: CD | — | 61 |
| Click of Respect (with 5 Family Click) | Released: October 21, 2003; Label: Igloo Records; Format: CD, LP | — | 99 |
| Half a Klip | Released: September 25, 2007; Label: Chinga Chang, Latchkey, Koch; Format: CD | — | — |
| Riches, Royalty, Respect | Released: May 31, 2011; Label: Fat Beats, Full Mettle; Format: CD, LP | — | — |
| Once Upon a Crime (with The Godfathers) | Released: November, 2013; Label: Psycho+Logical, Full Mettle; Format: CD | — | — |
| Return of the Don | Released: June 2, 2017; Label: Clockwork Music, Full Mettle; Format: CD, digital download, Vinyl | — | — |
| Son of G Rap (with 38 Spesh) | Released: July 20, 2018; Label: Full Mettle, Clockwork Music; Format: CD, digital download, Vinyl | — | — |
| Last of a Dying Breed | Released: December 9, 2022; Label: Full Mettle, DMG; Format: CD, digital download, Vinyl | — | — |

=== Compilation albums ===
List of compilation albums
| Title | Album details |
|---|---|
| Killer Kuts | Released: March 29, 1994; Label: Cold Chillin'; Format: CD, CS, LP |
| Rated XXX | Released: June 4, 1996; Label: Cold Chillin'; Format: CD, CS, LP |
| The Best of Cold Chillin' | Released: October 17, 2000; Label: Cold Chillin'; Format: CD, CS, LP |
| Greatest Hits | Released: March 7, 2002; Label: Landspeed; Format: CD |
| Street Stories: The Best of Kool G Rap & DJ Polo | Released: June 18, 2013; Label: Landspeed; Format: CD, LP |

=== Extended plays ===
List of studio albums, with selected chart positions
| Title | Album details | Peak chart positions | |
| Title | Album details | US | US R&B |
|---|---|---|---|
| Offer You Can't Refuse | Released: February 2, 2011; Label: Self-released; Format: Digital download | — | — |
"—" denotes a recording that did not chart or was not released in that territory.

=== Mixtapes ===
List of compilation albums
| Title | Album details |
|---|---|
| Dead or Alive | Released: April 17, 2006; Label: Shadyville; Format: CD |
| Legends, Vol. 3 | Released: January 21, 2008; Label: Nocturne; Format: CD |
| The Veteran | Released: November 3, 2008; Label: J-Love Enterprises; Format: CD |
| Kool G Rap & Twinn Loco Present – I Live Hip Hop – The Mixtape | Released: 2010; Label: Format: CD |

== Singles ==
=== As lead artist ===
List of singles as lead artist, with selected chart positions, showing year released and album name
| Title | Year | Peak chart positions | | | Album |
| Title | Year | US | US R&B | US Rap | Album |
|---|---|---|---|---|---|
| "It's a Demo" | 1986 | — | — | — | —N/a |
| "Poison" | 1988 | — | — | — | Road to the Riches |
| "Road to the Riches" | 1988 | — | — | 16 | Road to the Riches |
| "Truly Yours" | 1989 | — | — | — | Road to the Riches |
| "Streets of New York" | 1990 | — | 92 | — | Wanted: Dead or Alive |
| "Erase Racism" (featuring Big Daddy Kane and Biz Markie) | 1990 | — | — | — | Wanted: Dead or Alive |
| "Bad to the Bone" | 1990 | — | — | — | Wanted: Dead or Alive |
| "Rikers Island" | 1991 | — | — | — | Wanted: Dead or Alive |
| "Ill Street Blues" | 1992 | — | — | 26 | Live and Let Die |
| "On the Run" | 1992 | — | — | 19 | Live and Let Die |
| "It's a Shame" | 1995 | — | — | — | 4,5,6 |
| "Fast Life" (featuring Nas) | 1995 | 74 | 42 | 7 | 4,5,6 |
| "Hey Mister Mister" | 1996 | — | — | — | —N/a |
| "Lifestyles of the Rich and Famous" | 1996 | — | — | — | Rated XXX |
| "Talk Like Sex" | 1998 | — | — | — | Rated XXX |
| "Foul Cats" | 1998 | — | — | — | Roots of Evil |
| "Can't Stop the Shine" (featuring Miss Jones) | 1998 | — | — | — | Roots of Evil |
| "First Nigga" | 2001 | — | — | — | —N/a |
| "The Streets" | 2001 | — | — | — | The Giancana Story |
| "My Life" | 2002 | — | 81 | 6 | Soundbombing III / The Giancana Story |
| "Keep Going" (featuring Devin the Dude and Snoop Dogg) | 2002 | — | — | — | —N/a |
| "Ride On" (featuring Jagged Edge) | 2002 | — | — | — | —N/a |
| "Bout That" (featuring Ma Barker) | 2003 | — | — | — | —N/a |
| "It's Nothing" (featuring Joell Ortiz) | 2003 | — | — | — | The Giancana Story |
| "Gully" (with 5 Family Click) | 2003 | — | — | — | Click of Respect |
| "On the Rise Again" (featuring Haylie Duff) | 2008 | — | — | — | Half a Klip |
| "In Too Deep" (featuring Heather Walker) | 2011 | — | — | — | Riches, Royalty, Respect |
"—" denotes a recording that did not chart or was not released in that territory.

=== As featured artist ===
List of singles as featured artist, with selected chart positions, showing year released and album name
| Title | Year | Peak chart positions | | | Album |
| Title | Year | US | US R&B | US Rap | Album |
|---|---|---|---|---|---|
| "The Symphony" (Marley Marl featuring Masta Ace, Craig G, Big Daddy Kane, Kool G Rap) | 1988 | | | | In Control, Volume 1 |
| The Symphony Pt. 2 (Marley Marl featuring Masta Ace, Craig G, Big Daddy Kane, Kool G Rap & Little Daddy Shane) | 1991 | | | | In Control Volume II (For Your Steering Pleasure) |
| "Death Threat" (Brand New Heavies featuring Kool G Rap) | 1992 | — | — | — | Heavy Rhyme Experience, Vol. 1 |
| "Love Hurts" (The Poetess featuring Kool G Rap & Def Jef) | 1992 | | | | Simply a Poet |
| "Pee-Nile Reunion" (MC Shan featuring Kool G Rap, Neek, Diesel and Snow) | 1993 | — | — | — | non-album single |
| "Much Love" (Nutmeg featuring Kool G Rap) | 1995 | | | | non-album single |
| "Cardinal Sins" (B-1 featuring Kool G Rap) | 1998 | — | — | — | non-album single |
| "The Anthem" (Sway & King Tech featuring Kool G Rap, RZA, Tech N9ne, Eminem, Xzibit, Pharoahe Monch, Jayo Felony, Chino XL and KRS-One) | 1999 | — | — | — | This or That |
| "Symphony 2000" (Truck Turner featuring Kool G Rap, Big Pun and KRS-One) | 1999 | — | — | — | non-album single |
| "Cakes" (with the RZA) | 2000 | | | | Ghost Dog: The Way Of The Samurai |
| "N.Y.C." (Easy Mo Bee featuring Kool G Rap and Jinx da Juvy) | 2000 | — | — | — | Now or Never: Odyssey 2000 |
| "One Four Love Pt. 1" (with Common, Mos Def, Talib Kweli, Pharoahe Monch, Posdnuos, Rah Digga, Shabaam Sahdeeq and Sporty Thievz) | 2000 | | | | Hip Hop for Respect |
| "The Life" (DJ Hurricane featuring Jinx, Papoose and Kool G Rap) | 2000 | — | — | — | Don't Sleep |
| "Take a Loss" (DJ JS-1 featuring Kool G Rap) | 2001 | — | — | — | non-album single |
| "Let 'Em Live" (Chino XL featuring Kool G Rap) | 2001 | — | — | — | I Told You So |
| "Animal Rap" (Jedi Mind Tricks featuring Kool G Rap) | 2002 | — | — | — | Visions of Gandhi |
| "Letter P" (Saigon featuring Kool G Rap) | 2005 | — | — | — | non-album single |
| "Reckless Eye-Ballin'" (Verbal Threat featuring Kool G Rap) | 2006 | — | — | — | non-album single |
| "Caked Up" (Little Vic featuring Kool G Rap) | 2007 | — | — | — | non-album single |
| "Westerns" (Sagol 59 featuring Kool G Rap) | 2012 | — | — | — | non-album single |
| "Young N Foolish" (Hichkas featuring Kool G Rap, Quf and Reveal) | 2012 | — | — | — | non-album single |
| "Hell's Direction" (Cold World featuring Kool G Rap) | 2014 | — | — | — | non-album single |
| "The Call (Back to Business)" (The Headspinnaz featuring Kool G Rap) | 2014 | — | — | — | non-album single |
| "Industry (Juice Crew Remix)" (Cormega featuring Masta Ace, Craig G, & Kool G Rap) | 2014 | — | — | — | non-album single |
| "Naturally Born" (Big Noyd & Large Professor featuring Kool G Rap) | 2014 | — | — | — | non-album single |
| "Mobster Nostalgia" (CHG Unfadable featuring Kool G Rap) | 2015 | — | — | — | non-album single |
| "Bring Rawkus Back" (Pizon featuring Kool G Rap) | 2024 | — | — | — | Mic Scholar |
"—" denotes a recording that did not chart or was not released in that territory.

== Guest appearances ==
List of non-single guest appearances, with other performing artists, showing year released and album name
| Title | Year | Other artist(s) | Album |
|---|---|---|---|
| "The Symphony" | 1988 | Marley Marl, Big Daddy Kane, Craig G, Masta Ace | In Control, Volume 1 |
| "Don't Curse" | 1991 | Heavy D & the Boyz, Big Daddy Kane, Grand Puba, Q-Tip, Pete Rock & CL Smooth | Peaceful Journey |
| "The Symphony, Pt. II | 1991 | Marley Marl, Big Daddy Kane, Craig G, Masta Ace, Little Daddy Shane | In Control Volume II (For Your Steering Pleasure) |
| "Death Threat" | 1992 | The Brand New Heavies | Heavy Rhyme Experience, Vol. 1 |
| "Deadly Rhymes" | 1992 | Roxanne Shanté | The Bitch Is Back |
| "Bring It On" | 1993 | Ali Dee | Bring It On |
| "Straight Outta Ill Streets" | 1993 | Mesanjarz of Funk | Mesanjarz of Funk |
| "You Must Be Out of Your Fuckin' Mind" | 1993 | Fat Joe, Apache | Represent |
| "This Is How We..." | 1993 | Pudgee tha Phat Bastard | Give 'Em The Finger |
| "Brown Sugar" (Beatminerz Mix) | 1995 | D'Angelo | Brown Sugar 12" |
| "Much Love" | 1995 | Nutmeg | Ghetto's Child |
| "Reprasentin'" | 1996 | Ruffa | A Diamond in the Ruff |
| "Stick to Ya Gunz" | 1996 | M.O.P. | Firing Squad |
| "Know da Game" | 1997 | Frankie Cutlass, M.O.P., Mobb Deep | Politics & Bullshit |
| "Fifty Wayz" | 1997 | Gooch | A Lot on It |
| "Wishful Thinking" | 1997 | Big Pun, Fat Joe, B-Real | I'm Not a Player 12" |
| "Guns Blazing (Drums of Death, Pt. 1)" | 1998 | Unkle | Psyence Fiction |
| "40 Island" | 1998 | Noreaga, Mussolini | N.O.R.E. |
| "Truly Yours '98" | 1998 | Pete Rock, Large Professor | Soul Survivor |
| "Friend of Ours" | 1999 | E Moneybags, Nature | In E Moneybags We Trust |
| "The Anthem" | 1999 | Sway & King Tech, RZA, Tech N9ne, Eminem, Xzibit, Pharoahe Monch, Jayo Felony, Chino XL, KRS-One | This or That |
| "The Realest" | 1999 | Mobb Deep | Murda Muzik |
| "Thug Connection" | 1999 | Papoose, AZ | 12" |
| "Escape From N.Y." | 1999 | GetoPros | Fragments of Eternity {unreleased} |
| "Bedtime Stories" | 1999 | Bookie | Stressin' |
| "Q.B.G." | 1999 | Funkmaster Flex, Prodigy | The Tunnel |
| "Thug Onez" | 2000 | Half a Mill, Noreaga, Mussolini | Milíon |
| "Livin' It Up" | 2000 | OffDaMental | 12" |
| "Men of Business" | 2000 | Cuban Link, N.O.R.E., Lord Tariq, M.O.P. | 24K {unreleased} |
| "Fall Back" | 2000 | Big L | The Big Picture |
| "The Life" | 2000 | DJ Hurricane, Jinx Da Juvy, Papoose | Don't Sleep |
| "Dramacyde" | 2000 | The X-Ecutioners, Big Pun | Black and White (soundtrack) / Built from Scratch |
| "Class of '87" | 2000 | Tony Touch, Big Daddy Kane, KRS-One | The Piece Maker |
| "Legendary Street Team" | 2000 | M.O.P. | Lyricist Lounge 2 |
| "Ghetto Afterlife" | 2000 | Reflection Eternal | Train of Thought |
| "Real Life" | 2000 | Soul Assassins | Soul Assassins II |
| "Oz Theme 2000" | 2001 | Lord Jamar, Talib Kweli | Oz (soundtrack) |
| "Talk Like Sex Part 2" | 2001 | Smut Peddlers | Porn Again |
| "Live from the Streets" | 2001 | Angie Martinez, Styles P, Jadakiss, Beanie Sigel | Up Close and Personal |
| "Da Connection" | 2001 | Da Beatminerz, Ghostface Killah and Raekwon | 12" |
| "Let 'Em Live" | 2001 | Chino XL | I Told You So |
| "Thug Money" | 2001 | Yukmouth | Thug Lord: The New Testament |
| "I Am" | 2001 | G. Dep, Rakim | Child of the Ghetto |
| "Gorillas" | 2001 | Screwball, Noreaga | Loyalty |
| "No Surrender" | 2001 | Shabaam Sahdeeq | 12" |
| "Allied Meta-Forces" | 2002 | Canibus | Mic Club: The Curriculum |
| "Double Up" | 2002 | Big L, Ma Barker, Royal Flush | The Difference, Vol. 1 |
| "Nuthin Has Changed" | 2002 | King Tee, Tray Deee | The Kingdom Come |
| "Framed" | 2003 | Inspectah Deck, Killa Sin | The Movement |
| "As You Already Know" | 2003 | Big Pun, KRS-One, Truck Turner | D.I.G.I.T.A.L. |
| "Tho' It Up" | 2003 | DJ Doo Wop, Canibus, M.O.P. | The State Vs. Doo Wop |
| "You Don't Wanna" | 2004 | Brooklyn Academy, Charlie Hustle, Icon | Academics |
| "You Know I'm wit It" | 2004 | Ma Barker, Single Minded Pros | From Now On |
| "AIDS" | 2005 | Akinyele, Big Chuck, CJ Moore, MF Grimm | Scars & Memories |
| "One Shot" | 2005 | Huslah | Hood 2 Hood: The Blockumentary |
| "Ghost & Giancana" | 2005 | Ghostface Killah & Trife Da God | Put It on the Line |
| "Letter from Head Trauma" | 2005 | Canibus, Phoenix Orion, K-Solo | Cloak N Dagga: Def Con Zero |
| "Boom!" | 2006 | Big Daddy Kane, The Roots | Dave Chappelle's Block Party |
| "We Gone Go Hard" | 2006 | Ras Kass | Revenge of the Spit |
| "Right Now!" | 2006 | Agallah | You Already Know |
| "Full Metal Jacket" | 2006 | Mass Hysteria, Molemen | Killing Fields |
| "100 Roundz" | 2007 | Domingo | The Most Underrated |
| "Terrorise the City" | 2007 | Klashnekoff, Kyza | Lionheart: Tussle with the Beast |
| "Hood Tales" | 2007 | Marco Polo | Port Authority |
| "Come One, Come All" | 2007 | Styles P | The Ghost Sessions |
| "Next Up" | 2007 | UGK, Big Daddy Kane | Underground Kingz |
| "6 in the Morning" | 2007 | Sheek Louch, Joell Ortiz, Statik Selektah | Spell My Name Right |
| "And Wot (Remix)" | 2007 | Sweet Tooth & Carbon Kid | Unified: He Whanau Kotahi Tatou |
| "Buck Buck" | 2007 | DJ Envy, Red Café, Sheek Louch, Glasses Malone | The Co-Op |
| "Queens Thang" | 2008 | 50 Cent, LL Cool J, Prodigy, Tony Yayo | Exit 13 |
| "Poke the Puss" | 2008 | Steve-O | The Dumbest Asshole in Hip Hop |
| "Same Old Hood" | 2009 | Saul Abraham, St. Laz, Hanouneh | Lord Have Mercy |
| "Das Leid & The Light" | 2009 | Azad | Azphalt Inferno |
| "Gunz from Italy" | 2009 | Club Dogo | Dogocrazia |
| "Legendary" | 2009 | 67 Mob | Raising the Bar |
| "KGR & Honda" | 2009 | DJ Honda | DJ Honda IV |
| "Ill Figures" | 2009 | M.O.P., Raekwon | Wu-Tang Chamber Music |
| "ALC Theme" | 2009 | The Alchemist | Chemical Warfare |
| "Cursed" | 2010 | Diabolic, Grafh, Smoothe da Hustler | Liar & a Thief |
| "White Sand Part 2" | 2010 | Rick Ross, Triple C's | The Albert Anastasia EP |
| "Knife Fight" | 2010 | Rick Ross | The Albert Anastasia EP |
| "Street Knowledge" | 2010 | Bateria, Kool Sphere, M-Dot & DJ Jean Maron | RUN MPC |
| "Boot Rap" | 2010 | Canibus, Mark Deez | Bootstrap Theory |
| "Ready for War" | 2010 | Chi-Ill | The Last Lounge |
| "Controlling tha Game" | 2010 | Tyger Vinum | Grindin Muzik |
| "Frozen" | 2010 | The Left | Gas Mask |
| "3 Extremes" | 2010 | Dusty Philharmonics, Cory Reyez, Vivid | The Audiotopsy |
| "Kies in tha Game" | 2011 | Duo Kie | De Cerebri Mortis |
| "Rivers of Blood" | 2012 | Wu-Tang Clan | The Man with the Iron Fists (soundtrack) |
| "Wolves Amongst the Sheep" | 2012 | Vinnie Paz, Block McCloud | God of the Serengeti |
| "Keep it Live" | 2012 | HST, Jeżozwierz, NNFoF, PIH, RPS | No Name Full of Fame |
| "Depths of Despair" | 2012 | Tall-Order | The Tree of Life & Death |
| "Summertime" | 2013 | Adil Omar, Gravity, Greydon Square | The Mushroom Cloud Effect |
| "A Queens Thing" | 2013 | Action Bronson, Tony Touch | The Piece Maker 3: Return of the 50 MC's |
| "Ink Spatter" | 2013 | Dray Sr., Trails | Anvils & Pianos |
| "Blood & Bones" | 2013 | Nutso, Mic Geronimo | I Plead The 5th EP |
| "Chess Never Checkers" | 2013 | DJ Dez, DJ Butter, Guilty Simpson | A Piece Of The Action |
| "Tiger Uppercut" | 2013 | Harry Fraud, TrapZillas, Logic Ali | Adrift |
| "F.A.M." | 2013 | Canibus, Bronze Nazareth, M-Eighty, Nino Graye | Canibus Presents Almighty: The 2nd Coming |
| "The Battlefield" | 2014 | Ghostface Killah, AZ, Tre Williams | 36 Seasons |
| "The Dogs of War" | 2014 | Ghostface Killah, Shawn Wigs | 36 Seasons |
| "Loyalty" | 2014 | Ghostface Killah, Nems | 36 Seasons |
| "Free" | 2014 | Domingo, Greg Nice, KRS-One | Same Game New Rules |
| "Talkin To U" | 2014 | Domingo, Matt Fingaz, Prodigy, DJ Ready Cee | Same Game New Rules |
| "Men at Work 2020" | 2014 | Domingo, Nutso, Ras Kass, Action Bronson, Necro, Marley Marl | Same Game New Rules |
| "Mechanical Animals" | 2014 | Saigon, Memphis Bleek, Lil Bibby | G.S.N.T. 3: The Troubled Times of Brian Carenard |
| "Cross Island Expressway" | 2014 | Gotham Green, Nature | Child of an Immigrant |
| "Queens" | 2016 | N.O.R.E., Royal Flush, Nature | Drunk Uncle |
| "Dragon Fire" | 2020 | R.A. the Rugged Man, Ghostface Killah, Masta Killa, XX3EME | All My Heroes Are Dead |
| "International" | 2024 | Rakim, Joell Ortiz, Tristate | G.O.D.'s Network - Reb7rth |
| "Still Ill!" | 2026 | Rakim, Kurupt, Masta Killa, KRS-One | The Godbody LP |

== Music videos ==
=== As lead artist ===
List of music videos as lead artist, showing year released and director
| Title | Year | Director(s) |
|---|---|---|
| "Road to the Riches" | 1988 | |
| "Streets of New York" | 1990 | |
| "Erase Racism" (featuring Big Daddy Kane and Biz Markie) | 1990 | Fab Five Freddy |
| "Ill Street Blues" | 1992 | Lionel C. Martin |
| "On the Run" | 1992 | |
| "It's a Shame" | 1995 | |
| "Fast Life" (featuring Nas) | 1995 | Brian Luvar |
| "Can't Stop the Shine" (featuring Miss Jones) | 1998 | |
| "Cakes" (with the RZA) | 1999 | Nick Quested |
| "One Four Love Pt. 1" (with Common, Mos Def, Talib Kweli, Pharoahe Monch, Posdnuos, Rah Digga, Shabaam Sahdeeq and Sporty Thievz) | 2000 | |
| "My Life" | 2001 | |
| "Gully" (with 5 Family Click) | 2003 | Stoney XL and D.C. Coles |
| "In Too Deep" (featuring Heather Walker) | 2011 | OdaGiant and Eddy Duran |

=== As featured artist ===
List of music videos as a featured artist, showing year released and director
| Title | Year | Director(s) |
|---|---|---|
| "The Symphony" (Marley Marl featuring Kool G Rap, Masta Ace, Big Daddy Kane & Craig G) | 1988 | |
| "The Symphony Part II" (Marley Marl featuring Kool G Rap, Masta Ace, Big Daddy Kane, Craig G & Little Daddy Shane) | 1991 | |
| "Don't Curse" (Heavy D featuring Kool G, Q-Tip, Grand Puba, Pete Rock & C.L. Smooth and Big Daddy Kane) | 1991 | |
| "Love Hurts" (The Poetess featuring Def Jef & Kool G Rap) | 1993 | |
| "Pee-Nile Reunion" (MC Shan featuring Snow, Neek the Exotic, Kool G Rap & Diesel) | 1993 | |
| "Much Love" (Nutmeg featuring Kool G Rap) | 1995 | |
| "The Anthem" (Sway & King Tech featuring Chino XL, Eminem, Jayo Felony, Kool G Rap, KRS-One, Pharoahe Monch, RZA, Tech N9ne and Xzibit) | 1999 | J. Jesses Smith |
| "N.Y.C." (Easy Mo Bee featuring Jinx da Juvy and Kool G Rap) | 2000 | |
| "Real Life" (Soul Assassins featuring Kool G Rap) | 2000 | |
| "The Call (Back to Business)" (The Headspinnaz featuring Kool G Rap) | 2014 | Kool G Rap |
| "Mobster Nostalgia" (CHG Unfadable featuring Kool G Rap) | 2015 | |
