= Talk Like Sex =

Single by Kool G Rap & DJ Polo

from the album Rated XXX
- A-side: "Talk Like Sex"
- B-side: "Fuck U Man"
- Released: 1996
- Genre: Dirty rap, East coast hip hop, golden age hip hop
- Length: 5:14
- Label: Cold Chillin'
- Songwriter(s): Nathaniel Wilson
- Producer(s): Kool G Rap

Kool G Rap & DJ Polo singles chronology
"Lifestyles of the Rich and Famous" (1996)	"Talk Like Sex" (1996)

Kool G Rap singles chronology
"Lifestyles of the Rich and Famous" (1996)	"Talk Like Sex" (1996)	"Foul Cats" (1998)

"Talk Like Sex" is a song by American hip hop duo Kool G Rap & DJ Polo, originally recorded for their 1990 album Wanted: Dead or Alive and later released as the second single from 1996's Rated XXX. It was also featured on the compilation albums The Best of Cold Chillin' (2000), Greatest Hits (2002) and Street Stories: The Best of Kool G Rap & DJ Polo (2013).

== Background ==
The song first featured as the fifth track from Kool G Rap & DJ Polo's 1990 album Wanted: Dead or Alive and was later included on the 1996 album Rated XXX, which comprised a number of classics and previously unheard songs. "Talk Like Sex" was released as the second single from this album with "Fuck U Man" as a B-side.

"Talk Like Sex" was Kool G Rap's first dirty rap song and he recalled in a 2014 interview:

This was a concept. I had always been a rapper for the thugs, the drug dealers, the goons, and the dudes locked up. I wanted to make something in a different direction. It wasn't meant to be smooth. It was meant to get chicks interested in me in that kind of light but be funny at the same time. Everything is not always straight-faced or ice grilling for me. I like to laugh, I like to joke around. I like when other people make me laugh. Concept songs were very important but I never forced them. I would just let everything come natural, whatever took over my imagination I'd just roll with that. But I did want to rap about interesting shit. I didn't want to do a thousand "Men At Works", or a hundred "Road to the Riches". I wanted to expand.

— Kool G Rap

A sequel to the song, "Talk Like Sex Part 2", was recorded by Smut Peddlers featuring Kool G Rap on the 2001 album Porn Again.

== Samples ==
"Talk Like Sex" samples the following songs:

- "Different Strokes" by Syl Johnson
- "The Lovomaniacs" by Boobie Knight & the Universal Lady
- "The Symphony" by Marley Marl featuring Big Daddy Kane, Craig G, Kool G Rap and Masta Ace

And was later sampled on:

- "Fuck U Man" by Kool G Rap & DJ Polo
- "Sweat of My Balls" by CB4

== Track listing ==
A-side

1. "Talk Like Sex" (5:12)

B-side

1. "Fuck U Man" (4:10)
