= Ill Street Blues =

Single by Kool G Rap & DJ Polo

from the album Live and Let Die
- B-side: "Fuck U Man"
- Released: 1992
- Recorded: 1992; Powerplay Studios, Chung King Studios (New York City)
- Genre: East Coast hip hop; hardcore hip hop; mafioso rap; gangsta rap
- Length: 3:46
- Label: Cold Chillin'
- Songwriter(s): Nathaniel Wilson
- Producer(s): Trackmasters

Kool G Rap & DJ Polo singles chronology
"Bad to the Bone" (1991)	"Ill Street Blues" (1992)	"On the Run" (1992)

Music video
- "Ill Street Blues" on YouTube

"Ill Street Blues" is the first single from American hip hop duo Kool G Rap & DJ Polo's 1992 album Live and Let Die. Released with "Fuck U Man" as a B-side, it was later also featured on the compilation albums Killer Kuts (1994), The Best of Cold Chillin' (2000) and Greatest Hits (2002).

== Background ==
A hardcore hip hop song with elements of Mafioso rap, "Ill Street Blues" sees Kool G Rap tell the story from the perspective of a career criminal and mob henchman. The song is driven by bluesy piano loops sampled from Joe Williams' "Get Out of my Life", and G Rap recalled in a 2014 interview:

The first time we went to the studio in Queens, [producer] Frank Nitty was like, "Yo G, I got this sick loop," but he didn't have it on him. He had to go all the way back to his crib in the Bronx to go get ["Get Out of My Life" by Joe Williams and the Jazz Orchestra]. As soon as I heard the beat it inspired the song. I wrote the first two verses right there. When we went to mix the record, I had the third verse prepared to lay down.

— Kool G Rap

The song's first verse tells of G Rap and his sidekick Bill Blass being sent to retrieve money from a cocaine-addicted bartender named Jimmy who is in debt to the mob. He is unable to pay the money, however, and they are instructed to kill him instead. Blass distracts him while G Rap enters the bar through the back entrance, and kills Jimmy by shooting him in the back of the head and stabbing him with a knife. He describes committing various robberies in verse two and, in verse three, tells of how his mob boss betrayed him and attempted to have him and Blass killed. They take revenge by throwing him from a skyscraper.

Speaking of the identity of Bill Blass, his sidekick in the song, G Rap said:

Bill Blass was my man. He was a real street dude out of Brooklyn. He ended up being my road manager for awhile. He was in the video for "Ill Street Blues" and "Road To The Riches", and on the back cover for Wanted: Dead or Alive. I connected him with Eric B.

— Kool G Rap

"Ill Street Blues" was recorded at Powerplay Studios and Chung King Studios in New York City.

== Music video ==
The music video for "Ill Street Blues", Kool G Rap & DJ Polo's fourth, was directed by Lionel C. Martin and portrays some of the events mentioned in the song.

== Critical acclaim ==
About.com ranked "Ill Street Blues" at #35 in their list of 100 greatest rap songs.

== Samples ==
"Ill Street Blues" samples the following songs:

- "Get Out of My Life" by Joe Williams featuring The Jazz Orchestra

And was later sampled on:

- "At the Top" by M.O.B. (Massive of Brooklyn)
- "Bronx Tale" by Fat Joe featuring KRS-One
- "Bad Boy Elect" by Sleepy Wonder
- "Make a Buck" by Count Bass D featuring MF Doom
- "Tuned Mass Damper" by El-P
- "Ill Street Blues" by DJ Mitsu the Beats and Fat Loop

== Track listing ==
=== 12" ===
A-side

1. "Ill Street Blues" (Illest Version) (3:46)
2. "Ill Street Blues" (Acapella) (3:24)

B-side

1. "Fuck U Man" (4:10)
2. "Ill Street Blues" (Instrumental) (3:45)

=== Cassette ===
A-side

1. "Ill Street Blues" (Illest Version) (3:46)
2. "Ill Street Blues" (Acapella) (3:24)

B-side

1. "Ill Street Blues" (Instrumental) (3:45)
2. "Fuck U Man" (4:10)

=== CD ===
1. "Ill Street Blues" (Illest Version) (3:49)
2. "Ill Street Blues" (Acapella) (3:28)
3. "Ill Street Blues" (Instrumental) (3:49)
4. "Fuck U Man" (4:01)

== Charts ==
Chart (1992)	Peak position
U.S. Billboard Hot Rap Tracks	26
