= Lifestyles of the Rich and Famous (disambiguation) =

Lifestyle of the Rich and Famous may refer to:

- Lifestyles of the Rich and Famous, an American television series which aired from 1984 to 1995
- "Lifestyles of the Rich and Famous" (Kool G Rap & DJ Polo song), 1996
- "Lifestyles of the Rich and Famous" (Good Charlotte song), 2002
