= Riches, Royalty, Respect =

Studio album by Kool G Rap
- Released: May 31, 2011
- Recorded: 2010–2011
- Genre: East Coast hip hop; hardcore hip hop; mafioso rap; gangsta rap
- Length: 47:33
- Label: Fat Beats
- Producer: The Alchemist; Blastah Beatz; Gordon "H.U.M.P." Humphrey; DJ Infamous; The Insurgency; Leaf Dog; LEVEL 13; Marley Marl; Simply Smashin; DJ Supa Dave

Kool G Rap chronology
Offer You Can't Refuse (2011)	Riches, Royalty, Respect (2011)	Once Upon a Crime (2013)

Professional ratings
Review scores
Source	Rating
AllMusic	3.5/5 stars
HipHopDX	3.5/5 stars
iHipHop	3/5 stars
Rap Reviews	7.5/10 stars
XXL	3/5 stars

Riches, Royalty, Respect is the fifth solo album by American rapper Kool G Rap, released on May 31, 2011 by Fat Beats.

== Background ==
Riches, Royalty, Respect has a more vintage, soulful sound than much of Kool G Rap's previous work, with notable 1970s artists such as Al Green and Lee Moses sampled on the album, although his usual hardcore, Mafioso sound also features prominently throughout. Production was overseen by mostly lesser-known producers, with some exceptions like The Alchemist, DJ Infamous and Marley Marl. Offer You Can't Refuse, an eight track EP, was released in January 2011 as a prelude to the album.

A music video for the song "In Too Deep" was uploaded to YouTube by FatBeatsRecords on June 20, 2011.

== Reception ==
Riches, Royalty, Respect received generally mixed to positive reviews from music critics. Andy Kellman of AllMusic gave the album 3.5 stars out of five, saying "The production lineup for Riches, Royalty, Respect is not quite as impressive as that of 2007's Half a Klip, which boasted DJ Premier. G Rap instead leans on beats from an assortment of up-and-comers while enlisting DJ Supa Dave, the Alchemist, and career-long associate Marley Marl. Although G Rap's flow is not as energizing as it once was -- it now packs a heft that is both considerable and measured -- he can still spin a tale, draw up a fleshed-out concept, and epitomize hardcore rap as well as any MC half his age. The rugged and more dramatic beats -- 'In Too Deep,' 'Sad,' and the Havoc-assisted 'American Nightmare' -- bring out the best in G Rap. His mere presence is enough to carry the weaker tracks". Andres Vasquez from HipHopDX also gave the album 3.5 out of five and stated "G Rap can still hang, using his patented multisyllabic style to perfection throughout, flashing this skill frequently. Lyrically, G Rap also shows his sharp lyricism on 'Sad,' one of the album's most interesting, heartfelt cuts over a Lee Moses sample. 'Pages of My Life' also shows more of this introspection. Here, G Rap shows why veteran emcees should still have an integral voice in our culture. Of course, the right beats are important in backing every emcee. For his support, G Rap went for mostly lesser-known producers (with some exceptions like Alchemist and Marley Marl) who had a similar vision. Taking off with the throwback theme in place, each producer drops a soulful sample laden track, a Memory Lane for all who take this album for a spin. 'In Too Deep,' 'The Meaning to Your Love,' 'Sad,' 'Pages of My Life,' and 'Da Real Thing' all showcase this nostalgic vibe properly. By providing the soulful instrumentals, it allows G Rap to do what he does best with no distractions".

Robert Baker at iHipHop gave Riches, Royalty, Respect a score of three out of five and commented "Though he has remained low key for a number of years, G Rap doesn't show any fatigue on Riches, Royalty, Respect. In fact, Giancana shows fans that he can still whip up delectable hood stories from the bubbling Pyrex pot that we all love. However, the album is far from flawless, and as most fans can agree, the true Achilles heel of all G Rap albums is not its lyricism, but its production. Nonetheless, Riches, Royalty, Respect is better than half the garbage that overflows the commode nowadays. Yet, just as any legend in the game, G Rap is cursed with having his work constantly mounted against prior releases that have all received critical acclaim. With that said, G Rap's latest installment is mediocre at best."

Rap Reviews' Matt Jost scored the album as a 7.5 out of ten and noted "On the face of it, Riches, Royalty, Respect delivers the goods. 'In Too Deep' conjures up the familiar portrait of the artist as a cold-blooded, cocaine-slinging hustler entrapped by the trap. Producer DJ Supa Dave sets the scenery to music by digging deep into symphonic soul. Yet like virtually all comebacks from rap's elder statesmen, Riches, Royalty, Respect reveals certain shortcomings that may or may not have been present before but become apparent as rap history advances. Advocates of the arform will argue that Kool G Rap and most of today's successful rap acts are worlds apart artistically. They are absolutely right, but for a Kool G Rap the bar is placed higher than chart positions and numbers of social media followers".

Alvin Blanco of XXL gave the album three out of five, saying "For the most part, the Queens native relies on his signature style, where he shines, weaving yarns about illicit scenarios that often include shady vixens looking for a come up. Though the album includes beats from Alchemist and old Juice Crew buddy Marley Marl, a lack of star-level production hinders the release a bit. Even so, a legion of lesser-known beatsmiths build a capable enough backdrop to showcase G Rap's New York grittiness".

== Track listing ==
No.	Title	Producer	Length
1.	"Pimptro"	Blastah Beatz	1:50
2.	"Ya Chic Chose Me"	The Insurgency	3:35
3.	"In Too Deep" (featuring Heather Walker)	DJ Supa Dave	3:13
4.	"70's Gangsta"	Leaf Dog	3:19
5.	"Pillow Talk"	DJ Supa Dave	2:39
6.	"The Meaning to Your Love"	LEVEL 13	2:53
7.	"Sad"	DJ Supa Dave	3:09
8.	"Maggie"	Simply Smashin	3:52
9.	"$ Ova Bitches"	Marley Marl	2:41
10.	"G On"	The Insurgency	2:34
11.	"Pages of My Life"	DJ Supa Dave	2:38
12.	"Goin In"	Gordon “H.U.M.P.” Humphrey	4:18
13.	"American Nightmare" (featuring Havoc)	The Alchemist	3:12
14.	"Da Real Thing" (featuring Heather Walker)	LEVEL 13	3:10
15.	"Harmony Homicide"	Infamous	4:31

== Samples ==
- "American Nightmare"
  - "A Song for All Seasons" by Renaissance
- "Maggie"
  - "Drowning Man" by U2
- "$ Ova Bitches"
  - "Truly Yours" by Kool G. Rap & DJ Polo
- "Pages of My Life"
  - "True Love Don't Grow on Trees" by Helene Smith
- "The Meaning to Your Love"
  - "The Limit to Your Love" by Feist
- "In Too Deep"
  - "Whisper" by The True Reflection
- "Sad"
  - "I'm Sad About It" by Lee Moses
- "Da Real Thing"
  - "What a Wonderful Thing Love Is" by Al Green
