= It's a Shame =

It's a Shame may refer to the following songs:

- "It's a Shame" (The Spinners song), a 1970 single by The Spinners
- "It's a Shame" (Kris Kross song), a 1993 single by Kris Kross
- "It's a Shame" (Kool G Rap song), a 1995 single by Kool G Rap
- "It's a Shame (My Sister)", a 1990 single by Monie Love
- "It's a Shame", a song by Bruce Springsteen on his 2010 album The Promise

== See also ==
- "Such a Shame", a 1984 single by Talk Talk with the chorus "It's a shame"
