= Hey Mister Mister =

Single by Kool G Rap
- Released: 1996
- Recorded: 1995
- Genre: Horrorcore; underground hip hop
- Length: 3:57
- Songwriter(s): Nathaniel Wilson
- Producer(s): T-Ray

Kool G Rap singles chronology
"Fast Life" (1995)	"Hey Mister Mister" (1996)	"Lifestyles of the Rich and Famous" (1996)

"Hey Mister Mister" is a non-album single by American hip hop artist Kool G Rap, released in 1996. It later featured on the compilation album The Pre-Kill, Vol. 2 (2012).

== Background ==
Produced by T-Ray, "Hey Mister Mister" was originally set to be released on Kool G Rap's 1995 album 4,5,6. However, the song's subject matter was deemed too offensive by the album's labels, Cold Chillin', Epic Records and Sony Music Entertainment, and they refused to release it. It was released independently in 1996. In "Hey Mister Mister", Kool G Rap details several graphic beatings against females, starting on verse one as he discovers that his girlfriend has been unfaithful to him, and pistol-whips her unconscious in the street while threatening onlookers. On verse two, he portrays himself as a pimp being short-changed by a prostitute whom he tracks down and punishes with a severe beating and oral rape.

Complex ranked "Hey Mister Mister" at #1 on their list of the 25 most violent rap songs of all time.

== Track listing ==
A-side

1. "Hey Mister Mister" (3:57)

B-side

1. "Hey Mister Mister" (Instrumental) (3:57)
