= It's a Demo =

Single by Kool G Rap & DJ Polo
- A-side: "It's a Demo"
- B-side: "I'm Fly"
- Released: 1986
- Recorded: 1986
- Genre: East Coast hip hop; golden age hip hop
- Length: 3:59
- Label: Cold Chillin'
- Songwriters: Marlon Williams; Nathaniel T. Wilson
- Producer: Marley Marl

Kool G Rap & DJ Polo singles chronology
"It's a Demo" (1986)	"Rikers Island" (1988)

"It's a Demo" is the 1986 debut single by American hip hop duo Kool G Rap & DJ Polo. Originally a non-album single with "I'm Fly" as a B-side, a remix of the track was featured on the duo's 1989 album Road to the Riches and later on the compilation albums Killer Kuts (1994), The Best of Cold Chillin' (2000), Greatest Hits (2002) and Street Stories: The Best of Kool G Rap & DJ Polo (2013).

== Background ==
The song was recorded at Marley Marl's home studio in Queensbridge, Queens, New York City and was originally intended to be a demo track. It proved to be popular, however, and became Kool G Rap & DJ Polo's first single, premiered by DJ Mr. Magic on WBLS days after it was recorded. In a 2011 interview, Kool G Rap recalled:

[The "It's a Demo" session] is still kind of vivid. It was in the 'hood, Queensbridge Projects. It was real dim at the time; lights down in the studio; equipment running. Marley had never heard me before. He's just eager to hear me because of his boy Polo blowing me up like, "Yo, I got this young kid that's crazy!" When [Marley] heard what came out of my mouth nobody ever said, "Yo, G Rap, we want you to be with the Juice Crew." It just happened.

— Kool G Rap

== Samples ==
"It's a Demo" samples the following songs:

- "Funky Drummer" by James Brown
- "Singers" by Eddie Murphy

And was later sampled on:

- "Mister Cee's Master Plan" by Big Daddy Kane featuring Mister Cee
- "Butcher Shop" by Kool G Rap & DJ Polo
- "First Nigga" by Kool G Rap
- "Nostalgia" by Marco Polo featuring Masta Ace

== Track listing ==
A-side

1. "It's a Demo" (3:59)
2. "It's a Demo" (Dub)

B-side

1. "I'm Fly" (5:43)
2. "I'm Fly" (Dub) (5:32)
