= Streets of New York (song) =

Single by Kool G Rap & DJ Polo

from the album Wanted: Dead or Alive
- B-side: "Poison"
- Released: July 19, 1990
- Recorded: 1990
- Genre: East Coast hip hop; golden age hip hop; hardcore hip hop; jazz rap
- Length: 4:20
- Label: Cold Chillin'; Warner Bros.
- Songwriter(s): Nathaniel Wilson
- Producer(s): Kool G Rap; Large Professor; Anton Pukshansky

Kool G Rap & DJ Polo singles chronology
"Truly Yours" (1989)	"Streets of New York" (1990)	"Erase Racism" (1990)

"Streets of New York" is the first single from American hip hop duo Kool G Rap & DJ Polo's 1990 album Wanted: Dead or Alive. It was released as a single with "Poison" as a B-side and was later included on the compilation albums Killer Kuts (1994), The Best of Cold Chillin (2000), Greatest Hits (2002) and Street Stories: The Best of Kool G Rap & DJ Polo (2013).

== Background ==
Driven by the piano and saxophone sample of the Fatback Band's "Gotta Learn How To Dance", "Streets of New York" is a hardcore hip hop song about the social issues in New York City's ghettos, such as alcoholism, domestic violence, drug abuse, gambling addiction, gun violence, homelessness, police corruption, poverty and prostitution. In a 2014 interview, Kool G Rap recalled his inspiration for the song:

I've seen things like a blind man playing saxophone driving through Harlem when I was young. That just comes from my involvement in New York City. All this shit you would've seen, especially in the 70s. You would see dope fiends on the corner, dudes with puffy hands from shooting so much dope. I've seen that shit a lot, man. I've seen dudes with no eyes in their sockets. I've seen a chick with a fucking slit across her throat. I was always a part of the streets. You know how many dudes around me did shit, killed people and got killed? I wasn't detached from the streets at all.

— Kool G Rap

== Music video ==
"Streets of New York" was Kool G Rap & DJ Polo's second music video and shows a number of situations described in the song such as, a girl named Sonya who is suffering from pneumonia and whose mother works as a stripper, an alcoholic man who beats his wife every day until she stabs him, three drug dealers being murdered in an apartment, a mother who commits suicide by overdosing on sleeping pills, and a man being shot by a corrupt police officer. A man playing a saxophone is shown throughout.

== Critical acclaim ==
In 2012, Time Out ranked "Streets of New York" at #58 on their list of 100 best songs about New York City. AllMusic's Andy Kellman described it as "one of the most thrilling and unique rap singles released" and further stated that "the sparse rhythm, adorned with assured piano runs that complement the song to the point of almost making the song, falls somewhere between a gallop and a strut, and G Rap outlines more vivid scenes than one film could possibly contain. The track cemented Kool G Rap & DJ Polo's role as East Coast legends and showed Kool G Rap's talent as an adept storyteller like nothing before or since".

== Use in media ==
The song was featured on the soundtrack of the 2005 video game True Crime: New York City.

== Samples ==
"Streets of New York" samples the following songs:

- "Gotta Learn How to Dance" by the Fatback Band

And was later sampled on:

- "Hip Flow Mix" by DJ Rectangle
- "Last Good Sleep" by Company Flow

== Track listing ==
=== 12" ===
A-side

1. "Streets of New York" (Album Version) (4:00)
2. "Streets of New York" (Dub) (4:03)

B-side

1. "Streets of New York" (Long Version) (5:48)
2. "Poison" (Album Version) (4:45)

=== Cassette ===
A-side

1. "Streets of New York" (Album Version) (4:00)

B-side

1. "Poison" (Album Version) (4:45)

=== CD ===
1. "Streets of New York" (Album Version) (4:00)

== Charts ==
Chart (1990)	Peak position
U.S. Billboard Hot R&B/Hip-Hop Songs	92
