= Bad to the Bone (Kool G Rap & DJ Polo song) =

1991 single by Kool G Rap

Single by Kool G Rap & DJ Polo

from the album Wanted: Dead or Alive
- Released: April 3, 1991
- Recorded: 1990
- Genre: East Coast hip hop; golden age hip hop
- Length: 5:22
- Label: Cold Chillin'; Warner Bros.
- Songwriter(s): Nathaniel Wilson
- Producer(s): Eric B.; Kool G Rap (co.); Large Professor (co.)

Kool G Rap & DJ Polo singles chronology
"Erase Racism" (1990)	"Bad to the Bone" (1991)	"Ill Street Blues" (1991)

"Bad to the Bone" is the third single from American hip hop duo Kool G Rap & DJ Polo's 1990 album Wanted: Dead or Alive. It was later included on the compilation albums The Best of Cold Chillin (2000), Greatest Hits (2002) and Street Stories: The Best of Kool G Rap & DJ Polo (2013).

== Samples ==
"Bad to the Bone" samples the following songs:

- "Do the Funky Penguin" by Rufus Thomas

And was later sampled on:

- "The Finest Man" by Percy Filth featuring Chris Read

== Track listing ==
=== 12" ===
A-side

1. "Bad to the Bone" (Street Remix) (4:31)

B-side

1. "Bad to the Bone" (Radio Remix) (3:56)
2. "Bad to the Bone" (Dub) (4:31)

=== Cassette ===
A-side

1. "Bad to the Bone" (Street Remix) (4:31)

B-side

1. "Bad to the Bone" (Radio Remix) (3:56)
2. "Bad to the Bone" (Dub) (4:31)

=== CD ===
1. "Bad to the Bone" (Radio Remix) (3:56)
2. "Bad to the Bone" (Street Remix) (4:31)
3. "Bad to the Bone" (Dub) (4:31)
