= Erase Racism =

Single by Kool G Rap & DJ Polo featuring Big Daddy Kane and Biz Markie

from the album Wanted: Dead or Alive
- A-side: "Erase Racism"
- B-side: "Wanted: Dead or Alive"
- Released: November 14, 1990
- Recorded: 1990
- Genre: East Coast hip hop; conscious hip hop; golden age hip hop
- Length: 4:31
- Label: Cold Chillin'; Warner Bros.
- Songwriters: Marcel Hall; Antonio Hardy; Nathaniel Wilson
- Producers: Biz Markie; Cool V

Kool G Rap & DJ Polo singles chronology
"Streets of New York" (1990)	"Erase Racism" (1990)	"Bad to the Bone" (1991)

Big Daddy Kane singles chronology
"Rap Summary (Lean on Me)" (1989)	"Erase Racism" (1990)	"Cause I Can Do It Right" (1991)

Biz Markie singles chronology
"Just a Friend" (1989)	"Erase Racism" (1990)	"What Comes Around Goes Around" (1991)

"Erase Racism" is the second single from American hip hop duo Kool G Rap & DJ Polo's 1990 album Wanted: Dead or Alive, featuring Big Daddy Kane and Biz Markie. Released as a single with "Wanted: Dead or Alive" as a B-side, it was later also featured on the compilation albums The Best of Cold Chillin (2000) and Street Stories: The Best of Kool G Rap & DJ Polo (2013).

== Background ==
Kool G Rap reunited with his fellow former Juice Crew members Big Daddy Kane and Biz Markie to compose "Erase Racism" following the death of Yusef Hawkins, a 16-year-old African American who was shot to death by a group of Italian American youths in Bensonhurst, Brooklyn, New York City in 1989. The song speaks out against racism and xenophobia in society in what Sputnikmusic called "a partially serious, and partially humorous manner".

== Music video ==
The music video for "Erase Racism", Kool G Rap & DJ Polo's third, was directed by Fab Five Freddy and filmed in Jersey City, NJ, on 7th and 8th Streets, and at the Historic Jersey City and Harsimus Cemetery, and not actually in Bensonhurst, the neighbourhood where Yusef Hawkins was killed.

== Samples ==
"Erase Racism" samples the following songs:

- "Black and White" by Three Dog Night
- "What's Going On" by Les McCann
- "Sneakin' in the Back" by Tom Scott and The L.A. Express
- "Zimba Ku" by Black Heat

And was later sampled on:

- "I Ain't the Nigga" by The Coup

== Track listing ==
=== 12" ===
A-side

1. "Erase Racism" (4:30)

B-side

1. "Wanted: Dead or Alive" (Remix) (4:04)
2. "Wanted: Dead or Alive" (Dub) (4:04)
3. "Wanted: Dead or Alive" (Instrumental) (4:04)

=== Cassette ===
A-side

1. "Erase Racism" (4:30)

B-side

1. "Wanted: Dead or Alive" (Remix) (4:04)

=== CD ===
1. "Erase Racism" (4:30)
