= Fast Life (Kool G Rap song) =

Single by Kool G Rap featuring Nas Escobar

from the album 4,5,6
- B-side: "4,5,6"
- Released: November 14, 1995
- Recorded: 1995
- Genre: Mafioso rap
- Length: 4:55
- Label: Cold Chillin'; Epic Street
- Songwriters: Nathaniel Wilson; Nasir Jones; Ed Townsend
- Producer: Buckwild

Kool G Rap singles chronology
"It's a Shame" (1995)	"Fast Life" (1995)	"Hey Mister Mister" (1996)

Nas Escobar singles chronology
"One Love" (1994)	"Fast Life" (1995)	"Gimme Yours" (1995)

Music video
- "Fast Life" on YouTube

"Fast Life" is the second single from American hip hop artist Kool G Rap's debut album, 4,5,6 (1995), featuring Nas. Released with the song "4,5,6" as a B-side, it later also featured on Kool G Rap's 2002 compilation album Greatest Hits. "Fast Life" peaked at numbers 73 and 74 on the US Cash Box Top 100 and Billboard Hot 100 charts. The accompanying music video was directed by Brian "Black" Luvar.

== Background ==
Produced by Buckwild, "Fast Life" is a track that glorifies the criminal lifestyle with Kool G Rap and Nas Escobar portraying themselves as powerful and wealthy cocaine kingpins, boasting of their luxurious possessions and ruthless efficiency. The Mafioso theme of "Fast Life" is set early as the song opens with a sound bite from the 1983 film Scarface (Al Pacino's Tony Montana saying "The time has come, we gotta expand, the whole operation. Distribution, New York, to Chicago, L.A. We gotta set our own market, and enforce it.") and Nas later references such mob figures as Lucky Luciano, Bugsy Siegel and Frankie Yale. G Rap and Nas go line for line in the third and final verse of the song which Complex has described as "mind-blowing". The song's chorus goes as follows:

Livin the fast life, in fast cars
Everywhere we go, people know who we are
A team from out of Queens with the American Dream
So we're plottin' up a scheme to get the seven figure C.R.E.A.M.

Speaking of his collaboration with fellow Queens rapper Nas in a 2014 interview, Kool G Rap stated:

"Fast Life" was looked at as a passing of the torch to Nas, because before I had been shopping him around. He recorded his whole demo in my studio. By the time we did "Fast Life" together, Nas had already started to make his entry into the game. That was the first time we had rapped together on a song, and the timing made it a passing of the torch. Before that, I set up a meeting with Lyor Cohen and Kevin Liles at Def Jam to talk about Nas. Kevin Liles was the one who said that he sounds too much like a G Rap, and so Def Jam passed. I knew I had some influence on him but I knew he had his own identity.

— Kool G Rap

== Music video ==
The music video for "Fast Life" was directed by Brian "Black" Luvar and shows Kool G Rap and Nas "Escobar" living lavishly as they plot the construction of a mythical "Fast Life Hotel and Casino".

== Samples ==
"Fast Life" samples the following songs:

- "Trackin' Shoes" by A.B. Skhy
- "Happy" by Surface

And was later sampled on:

- "Jam" by A Tribe Called Quest featuring Consequence
- "Still Strugglin'" by Raekwon
- "Gunz From Italy" by Club Dogo featuring Kool G Rap
- "Fast Life" by Bassi Maestro
- "Fast Lane" by Vado featuring Raekwon
- "AutumnLeaves" by Bones (rapper)

== Track listing ==
=== 12" ===
A-side

1. "Fast Life" (Original) (4:54)
2. "Fast Life" (Instrumental) (4:54)
3. "Fast Life" (Acapella) (3:52)

B-side

1. "4,5,6" (Original) (3:20)
2. "4,5,6" (Instrumental) (3:20)

=== CD ===
1. "Fast Life" (Original) (4:54)
2. "Fast Life" (Instrumental) (4:54)
3. "Fast Life" (Acapella) (4:50)
4. "4,5,6" (Original) (3:20)
5. "4,5,6" (Instrumental) (3:20)

== Charts ==
Chart (1995)	Peak position
US Billboard Hot 100	74
US Dance Singles Sales (Billboard)	18
US Hot R&B/Hip-Hop Songs (Billboard)	42
US Hot Rap Songs (Billboard)	7
US Cash Box Top 100	73
