= Truly Yours (Kool G Rap & DJ Polo song) =

Single by Kool G Rap & DJ Polo

from the album Road to the Riches
- A-side: "Truly Yours"
- B-side: "Cold Cuts"
- Released: 1989
- Recorded: 1988
- Genre: East Coast hip hop; golden age hip hop; hardcore hip hop
- Length: 5:07
- Label: Cold Chillin'; Warner Bros.
- Songwriter(s): Marlon Williams; Nathaniel Wilson
- Producer(s): Marley Marl

Kool G Rap & DJ Polo singles chronology
"Road to the Riches" (1988)	"Truly Yours" (1989)	"Streets of New York" (1990)

"Truly Yours" is the third single from American hip hop duo Kool G Rap & DJ Polo's 1989 debut album Road to the Riches. It was released as a single with "Cold Cuts" as a B-side and later included on the compilation albums Killer Kuts (1994), The Best of Cold Chillin (2000), Greatest Hits (2002) and Street Stories: The Best of Kool G Rap & DJ Polo (2013).

== Background ==
The song is a diss track aimed at an unnamed woman who Kool G Rap either dated or wanted to date and who possibly left him or turned him down for a drug dealer. In the end, however, the drug dealer is in jail, the girl is working a menial job and living a questionable lifestyle, and G Rap is a successful recording artist.

In the song's second verse, G Rap uses several homophobic slurs against the drug dealer boyfriend, which caused some controversy at the time. In a 2014 interview, Kool G Rap recalled:

"Truly Yours" got protested against. Certain groups of people took offense to it and protested the album at the radio stations. That song pretty much got my album pulled off the shelves in the West Coast; all the protesting was coming from there. I was just being comical. This was a creative side of G Rap. It was nothing against homosexuals, I wasn't even thinking that way when I wrote it. But some people took it to heart. My contract was more with Cold Chillin' than Warner Brothers at that time, but there was nothing Cold Chillin' could do. Warner Brothers didn't know how to deal with rappers getting protested yet. When Ice-T did "Cop Killer", and they started getting flak from that, they decided not to fuck with Ice-T. Likewise, they didn't want to fuck with my album. Their solution to the negative attention was to shelf it. That's basically what happened.

— Kool G Rap

== Samples ==
"Truly Yours" samples the following songs:

- "N.T." by the Kool & the Gang
- "Sexy Woman" by Timmy Thomas

And was later sampled on:

- "Dedicated to the City" by Subsonic 2 featuring Guru
- "Truly Yours '98" by Pete Rock featuring Kool G Rap and Large Professor
- "Go With the Flow" by MF Doom
- "The Crab Inn" by Heltah Skeltah
- "$ Ova Bitches" by Kool G Rap

== Track listing ==
A-side

1. "Truly Yours" (Remix Vocal) (5:13)

B-side

1. "Truly Yours" (Dub) (5:13)
2. "Cold Cuts" (LP Version) (3:52)
