= On the Run (Kool G Rap & DJ Polo song) =

Single by Kool G Rap & DJ Polo

from the album Live and Let Die
- A-side: "On the Run"
- B-side: "Straight Jacket"
- Released: 1992
- Recorded: 1992
- Genre: East coast hip hop; hardcore hip hop; Mafioso rap; Gangsta rap
- Length: 4:40
- Label: Cold Chillin'
- Songwriter(s): Anthony Wheaton, Nathaniel Wilson
- Producer(s): Kool G Rap, Sir Jinx

Kool G Rap & DJ Polo singles chronology
"Ill Street Blues" (1992)	"On the Run" (1992)	"Lifestyles of the Rich and Famous" (1996)

Kool G Rap singles chronology
"Ill Street Blues" (1992)	"On the Run" (1992)	"It's a Shame" (1995)

Music video
- "On the Run" on YouTube

"On the Run" is the second single from American hip hop duo Kool G Rap & DJ Polo's 1992 album Live and Let Die. Released with "Straight Jacket" as a B-side, it was later also featured on the compilation albums Killer Kuts (1994) and The Best of Cold Chillin' (2000).

== Background ==
"On the Run" is a long, twisty heist story that Kool G Rap tells from the perspective of a low-level mob henchman, working for the Luciano crime family. Dissatisfied by what he thinks is insufficient pay for the drug running and money laundering jobs he is required to handle from day to day, he steals a shipment of 10 kg of cocaine (around $200,000 worth) so he can go into business for himself. His bosses catch him on the way to the airport, where he is plotting to flee town with his wife and son, but they are able to escape following a gunfight. He then drives into Mexico and stops at a filling station where he is again pursued by the Luciano family. He is able to kill his pursuers, including Don Luciano, and escapes.

== Music video ==
In the music video for "On the Run", Kool G Rap & DJ Polo's fifth and last as a duo, each scene follows and depicts the respective lyrics.

== Critical acclaim ==
Complex ranked "On the Run" at #29 on their list of 50 best storytelling rap songs.

== Samples ==
"On the Run" samples the following songs:

- "Surprises" by The Last Poets
- "I'm Gonna Love You Just a Little More Baby" by Barry White
- "Canned Funk" by Joe Farrell

And was later sampled on:

- "SlaughtaHouse" (Murder Mix) by Masta Ace Incorporated
- "Whassup Now Muthafucka?" by Artifacts

== Track listing ==
=== 12" ===
A-side

1. "On the Run" (Dirty Al Capone Version) (4:10)
2. "On the Run" (Instrumental Al Capone) (4:10)
3. "On the Run" (Acapella Al Capone) (3:55)

B-side

1. "On the Run" (Dirty Untouchable Version) (4:19)
2. "On the Run" (Instrumental Untouchable) (4:19)
3. "Straight Jacket" (Album Version) (3:11)

=== Cassette ===
A-side

1. "On the Run" (Dirty Al Capone Version) (4:10)
2. "On the Run" (Instrumental Al Capone) (4:10)
3. "On the Run" (Acapella Al Capone) (3:35)

B-side

1. "On the Run" (Dirty Untouchable) (4:19)
2. "On the Run" (Instrumental Untouchable) (4:19)
3. "Straight Jacket" (Album Version) (3:11)

=== CD ===
1. "On the Run" (Dirty Al Capone Version) (4:10)
2. "On the Run" (Instrumental Al Capone) (3:25)
3. "On the Run" (Acapella Al Capone) (3:45)
4. "On the Run" (Dirty Untouchable Version) (4:19)
5. "On the Run" (Instrumental Untouchable) (4:19)
6. "Straight Jacket" (Album Version) (3:11)

== Charts ==
Chart (1992)	Peak position
U.S. Billboard Hot Rap Tracks	19
