= Lifestyles of the Rich and Famous (Kool G Rap & DJ Polo song) =

Single by Kool G Rap & DJ Polo

from the album Rated XXX
- Released: 1996
- Genre: East Coast hip hop
- Length: 4:58
- Label: Cold Chillin'
- Songwriters: Leroy Burgess, James Calloway, Aaron Davenport, Nathaniel Wilson

Kool G Rap & DJ Polo singles chronology
"On the Run" (1992)	"Lifestyles of the Rich and Famous" (1996)	"Talk Like Sex" (1996)

Kool G Rap singles chronology
"Hey Mister Mister" (1996)	"Lifestyles of the Rich and Famous" (1996)	"Talk Like Sex" (1996)

"Lifestyles of the Rich and Famous" is the first single from American hip hop duo Kool G Rap & DJ Polo's 1996 album Rated XXX.

== Background ==
"Lifestyles of the Rich and Famous" is a braggadocio rap in which Kool G Rap boasts of his extravagant lifestyles, success with women and luxurious possessions. The song's hook samples the lines "I'm representin, puttin' Queens on the map" and "Playin' big willie style with the chauffeur. Yaknawmean?" from the Lost Boyz song "Jeeps, Lex Coups, Bimaz & Benz" and Junior M.A.F.I.A.'s "Player's Anthem", respectively. A heavy piano sample from the Fonda Rae song "Over Like a Fat Rat" can also be heard throughout.

== Samples ==
"Lifestyles of the Rich and Famous" samples the following songs:

- "Over Like a Fat Rat" by Fonda Rae
- "Player's Anthem" by Junior M.A.F.I.A. featuring The Notorious B.I.G.
- "Jeeps, Lex Coups, Bimaz & Benz" by Lost Boyz

And was later sampled on:

- "The Real Moneymaker" by Bassi Maestro

== Track listing ==
=== 12" ===
A-side

1. "Lifestyles of the Rich and Famous" (Vocal Version) (4:57)
2. "Lifestyles of the Rich and Famous" (Dub Version) (4:57)

B-side

1. "Lifestyles of the Rich and Famous" (Instrumental Version) (4:57)
2. "Lifestyles of the Rich and Famous" (Acapella Version) (3:39)

=== Cassette ===
A-side

1. "Lifestyles of the Rich and Famous" (Vocal) (4:57)

B-side

1. "Lifestyles of the Rich and Famous" (Dub) (4:57)
