= Offer You Can't Refuse =

EP by Kool G Rap
- Released: February 2, 2011
- Recorded: 2010–2011
- Genre: East Coast hip hop; hardcore hip hop; mafioso rap; gangsta rap
- Length: 23:23
- Producer: The Alchemist; Blastah Beats; DJ Pain; Domingo; Leaf Dog; Pokerbeats

Kool G Rap chronology
| Half a Klip (2008) | Offer You Can't Refuse (2011) | Riches, Royalty, Respect (2011) |

Professional ratings
Review scores
| Source | Rating |
|---|---|
| Rap Reviews | 7.5/10 stars |

Offer You Can't Refuse is an EP album by American rapper Kool G Rap, released independently on February 2, 2011. The first new solo release from Kool G Rap in three years, its producers included The Alchemist and Domingo, and Scar Child and Havoc appeared as guest vocalists.

== Background ==
Offer You Can't Refuse was released independently and for free online, serving as a prelude to the studio album Riches, Royalty, Respect which came out four months later. The EP features eight tracks, mostly consisting of one verse consisting of Kool G Rap rapping over a vintage, soulful instrumental, a sound that he would further expand on in Riches, Royalty, Respect. G Rap's usual hardcore, Mafioso style also features prominently throughout, however.

The EP's title is a reference to a line by Vito Corleone (Marlon Brando) in the 1972 film The Godfather.

== Reception ==
Jesal "Jay Soul" Padania of Rap Reviews gave Offer You Can't Refuse a score of 7½ out of ten, saying "It's a mix of soulful gangsta beats, all very professional and consistent, without ever being truly masterful. But it provides G Rap with a platform on which he can spit his unique brand of legendary lyrics, delivery and narrative. And trust that this review isn't some nostalgic, patronising pat on the back for some former great. Nope, KGR is back in full effect, and if his album is filled with brilliant production, not to mention a few choice guests, then expect RRR to provide the full package".

== Track listing ==
| No. | Title | Producer(s) | Length |
|---|---|---|---|
| 1. | "The Fix" | DJ Pain | 2:47 |
| 2. | "Mugshots" | Pokerbeats | 2:36 |
| 3. | "America's Nightmare" (featuring Havoc) | The Alchemist | 3:14 |
| 4. | "Take 'Em Back (Supafly)" | Blastah Beats | 3:08 |
| 5. | "Baggin' in da Spot" (featuring Scar Child) | Leaf Dog | 2:56 |
| 6. | "Scarface Snow" | | 3:18 |
| 7. | "Offer You Can't Refuse" | Domingo | 2:13 |
| 8. | "Money Talks" | | 3:13 |

Sample credits

- "The Fix" contains a sample from "No Love in the Room" by The 5th Dimension.
