= It's a Shame (Kool G Rap song) =

Single by Kool G Rap

from the album 4,5,6
- Released: August 15, 1995
- Studio: Bearsville Studios (Bearsville, New York)
- Genre: East Coast hip hop; hardcore hip hop; mafioso rap; gangsta rap
- Length: 4:04
- Label: Cold Chillin'; Epic Street; SME
- Songwriter(s): Joe Davis; Milton Johnson; James Van Leer; Nathaniel Wilson
- Producer(s): Naughty Shorts

Kool G Rap singles chronology
"On the Run" (1992)	"It's a Shame" (1995)	"Fast Life" (1995)

Music video
- "It's a Shame" on YouTube

"It's a Shame" is the debut solo single by American hip hop artist Kool G Rap, from his 1995 album 4,5,6.

== Background ==
"It's a Shame"
The first verse of "It's a Shame," Kool G Rap establishes himself as a heroin kingpin with themes of wealth, power, and extravagant lifestyle.

"It's a Shame" was recorded at Bearsville Studios in Bearsville, New York. In the song, Kool G Rap portrays himself as a heroin kingpin, boasting of his wealth, power and extravagant lifestyle. However, it is implied that he harbours a sense of remorse over his choice of trade, with the chorus (sung by an uncredited Sean Brown) stating:

Now it's a damn shame, what I gotta do just to make a dollar
Living in this game, sometimes it makes you wanna holler

== Music video ==
The music video for "It's a Shame" shows Kool G Rap living a life of luxury as a wealthy and powerful gangster as well as shots of drug addicts and prostitutes, signifying the less glamorous side of the drug trade.

== Critical reception ==
Hip Hop Album Reviews called the song "one of G Rap's premier ventures at storytelling, only weakened by the dime-a-dozen hook".

== Samples ==
"It's a Shame" samples the following songs:

- "Love Is for Fools" by Southside Movement

== Track listing ==
=== 12" ===
A-side

1. "It's a Shame" (Original) (4:02)
2. "It's a Shame" (Acapella) (4:01)
3. "It's a Shame" (Instrumental) (3:54)

B-side

1. "It's a Shame" (Original) (4:03)
2. "It's a Shame" (Acapella) (4:01)
3. "It's a Shame" (Instrumental) (3:54)

=== CD ===
1. "It's a Shame" (Original) (3:54)
2. "It's a Shame" (Acapella) (3:54)
3. "It's a Shame" (Instrumental) (3:54)
