= Poison (Kool G Rap & DJ Polo song) =

Single by Kool G Rap & DJ Polo

from the album Road to the Riches
- Released: 1988
- Recorded: 1988
- Genre: East Coast hip hop; golden age hip hop
- Length: 4:45
- Label: Cold Chillin'; Warner Bros
- Songwriter(s): Marlon Williams; Nathaniel Wilson
- Producer(s): Marley Marl

Kool G Rap & DJ Polo singles chronology
"Rikers Island" (1987)	"Poison" (1988)	"Road to the Riches" (1988)

"Poison" is the first single from American hip hop duo Kool G Rap & DJ Polo's 1989 debut album Road to the Riches. It was later included on the compilation albums Killer Kuts (1994), The Best of Cold Chillin (2000), Greatest Hits (2002) and Street Stories: The Best of Kool G Rap & DJ Polo (2013).

== Background ==
The song was initially set to feature a heavy sample of King Curtis' "Memphis Soul Stew" but it was later changed and was released as a single.

== Samples ==
"Poison" samples the following songs:

- "Get Up, Get into It, Get Involved" by James Brown
- "Just Rhymin' with Biz" by Big Daddy Kane featuring Biz Markie

And was later sampled on:

- "Poison" by Bell Biv Devoe
- "Poison" by The Prodigy
- "Best Foot Forward" by DJ Shadow
- "Boom!" by The Roots featuring Dice Raw
- "Poison" by Common Market

== Track listing ==
A-side

1. "Poison" (Hip Hop Version) (5:26)
2. "Poison" (Dub Version) (5:43)

B-side

1. "Poison" (Radio Version) (2:30)
