= Half a Klip =

Studio album by Kool G Rap
- Released: February 5, 2008
- Recorded: 2006–2007
- Genre: East Coast hip hop; hardcore hip hop
- Length: 34:57
- Label: Chinga Chang; Koch
- Producer: Domingo; Critical Child; Moss; 5 Family Click; Frank Dukes; Nomadic; Marley Marl; Marks; DJ Premier

Kool G Rap chronology
| Click of Respect (2003) | Half a Klip (2008) | Offer You Can't Refuse (2011) |

Singles from Half a Klip
- 1. "On the Rise Again" Released: February 29, 2008

Professional ratings
Review scores
| Source | Rating |
|---|---|
| AllHipHop | 7/10 stars |
| HipHopDX | 3/5 stars |
| PopMatters | 5/10 stars |
| The Smoking Section | 2.5/5 stars |

Half a Klip is the fourth album by American rapper Kool G Rap, released on February 5, 2008, by Chinga Chang, Latchey and Koch Records. It was the first new solo release from Kool G Rap in six years, and its producers included DJ Premier, Marley Marl, Domingo, and Marks. KL of Screwball, D-Roc and Haylie Duff appeared as a guest vocalists.

== Background ==
Half a Klip was Kool G Rap's first solo release since 2002's The Giancana Story and features nine original songs and two bonus tracks, showcasing the veteran rapper maintaining his gritty storytelling style while experimenting with a more contemporary sound. The album was initially set to be released in March 2007 and then was pushed back to September 25, 2007 before finally coming out on February 5, 2008.

The song "What's More Realer Than That" came out as a street single in February 2007.

== Reception ==
Half a Klip received mostly mixed reviews from music critics. Greg Watkins from AllHipHop gave the album 3½ out of five, saying "The nine tracks probably are not enough to support [Kool G Rap's] claim of being underrated; especially since some of them only run for about two minutes. However, they do keep you thirsting for more which is probably what G Rap was hoping to do with this one". HipHopDX's J-23 gave the album three out of five and said "The appropriately-titled Half a Klip may only be 9 tracks deep, but it brings the Kool Genius of Rap back where he needs to be. With production from former Juice Crew captain Marley Marl, DJ Premier, Domingo and Moss, the Queens legend is backed by the right kind of producers. The only glaring weak spot on the album is "Turn It Out," a track that is just as cheesy as its horribly cliché hook; "riding to the club, candy coated on the dubs." That doesn't mean Half A Klip is flawless otherwise, other than on the original version of "100 Rounds" (from Domingo's The Most Underrated), and "With a Bullet" do you really get the G Rap of old; spitting breathless flames at a rapid pace".

Quentin B. Huff of PopMatters gave Half a Klip a score of five out of ten and noted "[Kool G Rap's] rhymes are still gritty, grimy, and gory, and his flow is still intricately smooth, but the project as a whole travels lighter than you’ll want from an artist of his caliber". The Smoking Section scored the album 2½ out of five, commenting "While Kool G Rap has the resiliency of a war-tested veteran, Half a Klip is not his best work".

== Track listing ==
| No. | Title | Producer(s) | Length |
|---|---|---|---|
| 1. | "Risin Up" | Domingo | 3:51 |
| 2. | "Turn It Out" | Critical Child | 2:28 |
| 3. | "100 Rounds" (original version) | Domingo | 2:43 |
| 4. | "The Life" | MoSS | 4:08 |
| 5. | "Typical Nigga" | Frank Dukes | 1:38 |
| 6. | "What's More Realer Than That" | Domingo | 2:44 |
| 7. | "I Feel Bad for You Son" (featuring D-Roc) | Nomadic | 1:43 |
| 8. | "With a Bullet" (featuring K.L. of Screwball) | Marley Marl | 4:11 |
| 9. | "On the Rise Again" (featuring Haylie Duff) | DJ Premier; Rick Denzien | 3:43 |
| 10. | "What's More Realer Than That" (original mix) | Marks | 3:59 |
| 11. | "On the Rise Again" (radio edit) (featuring Haylie Duff) | DJ Premier | 3:44 |
