= Chinga Chang Records =

American hip hop record label

- Founded: 2003
- Founder: Dan Herman (CEO)
- Status: Active
- Distributor(s): Sony Entertainment
- Genre: Hip hop, rap
- Country of origin: United States
- Location: Philadelphia, Pennsylvania
- Official website: chingachang.com

Chinga Chang Records is a Philadelphia-based independent hip hop label. Founded by CEO Dan Herman in 2003, Chinga Chang has released music by artists including Kool G Rap and Lil Scrappy, including the Kool G Rap album Half a Klip in 2007. The label has also released two mixtapes, which include previously unreleased music by artists such as KRS-One, Ras Kass, Big Pun, and Sean Price.

== History ==
=== Early years ===
Chinga Chang Records was founded as a boutique hip hop label in 2003, by Philadelphia native Dan Herman, also known as DMAK. Herman, then only 18 eventually established offices in Pennsylvania, New York, and Florida.

In July 2006, the label released its first single, "Meal of the Day", by company artist Temp, which became popular in Bollywood. The label then released the mixtape Chang Gang Vol. 1: Stackin' Euros, which included then unheard tracks from artists including KRS-One, Ras Kass, Big Pun, and Sean Price. Each track from the album had a video made along with it, including one for Price's song "Ground Wit Ur Niggazz", shot in Brownsville, Brooklyn.

Also in 2006, CEO Herman signed Kool G Rap. According to Hip Hop Weekly, Chinga Chang "helped resurrect the career of Kool G Rap by backing the hip hop icon’s first studio disc in nearly a decade". Kool G Rap's album Half a Klip was produced by DJ Premier, who is associated with the label, and had vocals by actress Haylie Duff. A month later Herman signed a distribution deal for the album with Koch Entertainment.

In June 2007, the label released the mixtape The Official Joints LP via digital download, which included unreleased music by artists such as Rakim, Masta Ace, J Live, Guru, Beatnuts, Big Daddy Kane, KRS-One, and Big Pun. The first single off the album, Rakim's "Original Style", was also made into an unreleased cartoon.

=== Later signings ===
In June 2013, it was announced that former Nickelodeon actress Amanda Bynes had been offered a record deal by Chinga Chang, after Herman cleared the idea with The Orchard and Sony Entertainment. According to Herman, he retracted the offer after Bynes failed to show up to a meeting with Wyclef Jean. Herman instead signed the artist D Rock Starr, who had previously provided the hook for the track "I Feel Bad for You Son" on Half a Klip. D Rock's first single on Chinga Chang was "Sour Patch Kid", a diss track to Bynes.

In October 2013, Chinga Chang signed the rap group G4 Boyz, with distribution provided through Sony Entertainment. Also that month Chinga Chang signed Philadelphia rapper Cassidy, with Wyclef and DJ Premier slated to help with Cassidy's next album; however, a few weeks later the deal fell through, with Herman quoting artistic differences.

Herman instead signed Atlanta-based rapper Lil' Scrappy on November 1, 2013. Scrappy's first single, "They Hate Me" featuring Young Buck, was released on December 5. His solo album Reparations is meant to be released in Spring 2014, with a distribution deal by Sony. Another early single from Reparations, "Juicy On My Mind", was also released in December 2013.

A new album by Drock Star was announced for September 15, 2014, titled American Dream. Atlanta-based rapper 9Gotti signed to the label on May 20, 2014, after releasing a single on the label a week earlier.

Around July 2013, TMZ reported that Michael Lohan had brokered a deal with Herman for a recording contract for Ali Lohan. The deal had ended after Michael Lohan allegedly threatened Herman with violence.

== Artists ==
Current artists

- D Rock Star
- KoolK (Devine Hendricks)
- King Joe
- Lil' Scrappy
- Rych
- 9Gotti

Previous artists

- Temp
- Kool G Rap
- Cassidy

== Discography ==
=== Albums ===
- 2006: Chang Gang Vol. 1: Stackin' Euros by Various Artists (KRS-One, Ras Kass, Big Pun, and Sean Price)
- 2007: Half a Klip by Kool G Rap
- 2007: The Official Joints LP by Various Artists (Rakim, Masta Ace, J Live, Guru, Beatnuts, Big Daddy Kane, KRS-One, and Big Pun)
- 2014: Reparations by Lil Scrappy
- 2014: Potential Genius by Rych
- 2020: Walk By Faith by ELCAMINO

=== Singles ===
- 2006: "Meal of the Day" by Temp
- 2013: "Sour Patch Kid" by D Rock Star ft. DMAK
- 2013: You Only Live Once" by D Rock Star
- 2013: "They Hate Me" by Lil' Scrappy ft. Young Buck
- 2013: "Juicy On My Mind" by Lil' Scrappy
- 2014: "Strange Fruit" by King Joe
- 2014: "Witness" by 9Gotti
- 2014: "Imagination" by Rych
- 2014: "Need I Say More" by Rych
