= The Giancana Story =

Studio album by Kool G Rap
- Released: November 26, 2002
- Recorded: 2000–2002
- Genres: East Coast hip hop; hardcore hip hop; mafioso rap
- Length: 55:48
- Label: Koch
- Producers: Bink; Buckwild; Dr. Butcher; FB; Ghetto Professionals; Mike Heron; Jaz-O; Knobody; Amar Pep; Franky "Nitty" Pimentel; Rockwilder; V.I.C.; Young Lord

Kool G Rap chronology
Roots of Evil (1998)	The Giancana Story (2002)	Click of Respect (2003)

Singles from The Giancana Story
- 1. "The Streets" Released: 2001; 2. "My Life" Released: 2002; 3. "It's Nothing" Released: 2003

Professional ratings
Review scores
Source	Rating
AllMusic	4/5 stars
HipHopDX	4/5 stars
Mojo	3/5 stars
RapReviews	7.5/10 stars
Rolling Stone	3/5 stars

The Giancana Story is the third solo album by American rapper Kool G Rap, released by Koch Records on November 26, 2002. Its producers included Bink, Buckwild, Jaz-O, Knobody, Rockwilder and V.I.C., while AZ, Capone-N-Noreaga, Havoc, Joell Ortiz and Prodigy were among the guest vocalists.

== Background ==
After contributing to the Hip Hop for Respect project, a collection of rappers who released an EP to protest against police brutality, and performing the opening verse on the single "One Four Love Pt. 1", Kool G Rap's critically acclaimed turn on the track led to a deal with Rawkus Records. The Giancana Story was intended to be his debut album on the label and was initially set to be released in October 2000. However, the release of the album was delayed for over two years while Rawkus sorted out its increasingly labyrinthine label affiliations and the album was eventually licensed to a Koch Records subsidiary and finally received its debut on November 26, 2002.

The version of the album recorded for Rawkus and the one released by Koch vary greatly; there were more songs cut from the Koch version than were left on it, and a number of songs were retitled when included the Koch's album. "First Nigga", "First Nigga (DJ Premier Remix)" (which was a B-side on "The Streets" single), "Ride On" featuring Jagged Edge, "G Rap Is a Villain" featuring Ma Barker, "This Is My Life" featuring Capone-N-Noreaga, "Round & Round (Remix)" featuring Jonell, "Keep Goin'" featuring Snoop Dogg and Devin the Dude, "How It Feel" featuring Havoc, "Y'all Niggas" featuring Black Guerilla Family (which was released as a bonus track and renamed "Planet of the Apes" on the Japanese release of the Koch album), "This Means War", a version of "Holla Back" which included Nas and excluded Tito, "Nobody Can't Eat" (which was a B-side on the "My Life" single), "Ordinary Love" featuring Ma Barker, "Why You Gotta Do It Like That" featuring Ma Barker and "Thug Out" featuring Black Child, Caddillac Tah, Ma Barker and Jinx (the original version of "Spill Blood" which was released as a B-side to the "It's Nothing" single) were at least some of the songs which were recorded for Rawkus but not included on the album by Koch.

Three songs from Koch's version of The Giancana Story were released as singles; "The Streets" (which came with "Thug For Life" as a B-side) in 2001, "My Life" in 2002 and "It's Nothing" (with "Spill Blood" as a B-side) in 2003. The album, however, was not very commercially successful by not making it to the Billboard 200 and peaking at the Top R&B/Hip-Hop Albums charts at #63. "First Nigga", "Keep Going" and "Ride On" from the original Rawkus album were also released as promo singles.

Although he had previously stated that the "G" in his name stood for "genius", Kool G Rap states on the track "Drama (Bitch Nigga)":

"Everybody always wanna know what know what the G in Kool G Rap stand for. Giancana, nigga, gangsta. Quick to gank ya ass with the gigantic-ass gat, you heard".

== Reception ==
The Giancana Story received generally positive reviews from music critics. John Bush from AllMusic gave the album a rating of four out of five, saying "The Giancana Story proves that time means nothing to one of the greatest rappers ever (though Rawkus took it too far when they declared "the game was named after him"). Don't call it a comeback because he never left but Kool G's third solo record illustrates the rare case of the hip-hop world moving closer to a veteran than when he made his breakout. What sounded refreshing and genuinely unique in 1990 was becoming nearly ubiquitous by the end of the millennium, and besides slipping in a few more words per line than he used to, the first real hardcore rapper hasn't changed his style a whit (or needed to)" and describing the albums's sound as "pure hardcore rap, with all the dark intelligence and heavy venom hip-hop fans expect from a master".

HipHopDX's Afrikka also scored the album as four out of five and said "Kool G Rap once again proves he is an incredible storyteller and rhymesayer. With the Giancanna Story you have an album every serious fan should not be without. The farthest thing from a disappointment, there is no filler material, no water-me-down interludes, just pure music. One would be foolish not to have this album in their collection making it an easy recommendation".

Steve "Flash" Juon of RapReviews rated The Giancana Story at 7½ out of ten, noting "This album is not quite as strong as 1998's highly slept on Roots of Evil CD or seminal classics like Live and Let Die, but if you want to get your first taste of the Mario Puzo of hip-hop, it's a great place to start".

== Track listing ==
No.	Title	Producer(s)	Length
1.	"Thug For Life"	Young Lord	3:23
2.	"Where You At" (featuring Prodigy)	Bink	3:54
3.	"Holla Back" (featuring AZ, Azz Izz, Nawz and Tito)	Buckwild	5:25
4.	"It's Nothing" (featuring Joell Ortiz)	Ghetto Professionals	2:35
5.	"Drama (Bitch Nigga)"	Amar Pep	3:15
6.	"Thug Chronicles" (featuring Havoc)	FB; Ghetto Professionals	3:38
7.	"Blaze Wit Y'all" (featuring Jinx da Juvy)	Rockwilder	4:34
8.	"Black Widow"	Jaz-O	4:41
9.	"Fight Club" (featuring Shaqueen)	Franky "Nitty" Pimentel	3:31
10.	"My Life"	Mike Heron; V.I.C.	4:06
11.	"Good Die Young"	Young Lord	4:14
12.	"The Streets"	Buckwild	3:42
13.	"Gangsta Gangsta" (featuring 5 Family Click)	Dr. Butcher	3:33
14.	"My Life (Remix)" (featuring Capone-N-Noreaga)	Mike Heron; V.I.C.	5:09

Sample credits

- "The Fix" contains a sample from "No Love in the Room" by The 5th Dimension.
- "My Life" contains a sample from "Fania All Stars' Cha Cha Cha" by Fania All Stars.
- "Thug Chronicles" contains a sample from "Fourth Movement: Passacaglia" by Yusef Lateef

== Personnel ==
Credits for The Giancana Story adapted from Allmusic.

=== Musicians ===
- Kool G Rap – vocals, lyrics
- AZ – vocals
- Azz Izz – vocals
- Capone – vocals
- Havoc – vocals, lyrics
- Jinx da Juvy – vocals
- Nawz – vocals
- Noreaga – vocals
- Joell Ortiz – vocals
- Prodigy – vocals
- Shaqueen – vocals
- Tito – vocals

=== Additional personnel ===
- Dr. Butcher – producer, composer
- Amar Pep – producer, composer
- J.R. Baxter – composer
- Michael Benabib – photography
- Bink – producer
- J.T. Burks – composer
- Cochese – mixing
- Chris Conway – engineering, mixing
- J. Crespo – composer
- The Ghetto Pros – mixing, producer
- Jeff Gilligan – package design
- R. Harrell – composer
- Mike Heron – A&R, producer
- Robin Hill – sample clearance
- Jaz-O – producer
- Robin Hill – sample clearance
- Frank Nitti – producer
- Matt Quinn – engineer
- Rockwilder – producer, composer
- Duncan Stanbury – mixing
- Tommy Uzzo – mixing
- Max Vargas – engineer
- Doug Wilson – engineer, mixing
- Young Lord – producer
- Carlisle Young – engineer

== Charts ==
=== Album ===
Chart (2002)	Peak position
US Independent Albums (Billboard)	16
US Top R&B/Hip-Hop Albums (Billboard)	61

=== Singles ===
Song	Chart (2001)	Peak position
"The Streets"	U.S. Billboard Hot 100	—
"The Streets"	U.S. Hot R&B/Hip-Hop Singles & Tracks	—
"The Streets"	U.S. Hot Rap Singles	22
Song	Chart (2002)	Peak position
"My Life"	U.S. Billboard Hot 100	—
"My Life"	U.S. Hot R&B/Hip-Hop Singles & Tracks	81
"My Life"	U.S. Hot Rap Singles	6
Song	Chart (2003)	Peak position
"It's Nothing"	U.S. Billboard Hot 100	—
"It's Nothing"	U.S. Hot R&B/Hip-Hop Singles & Tracks	—
"It's Nothing"	U.S. Hot Rap Singles	—
