= Click of Respect =

Click Of Respect

Studio album by Kool G Rap & 5 Family Click
- Released: October 21, 2003
- Genre: East Coast hip hop
- Producer: C.O.S.; Buckwild; Ty Fyffe; DR Period

Kool G Rap & 5 Family Click chronology
The Giancana Story (2002)	Click Of Respect (2003)	Half a Klip (2008)

Click of Respect is a collaboration album by American rapper Kool G Rap and hip hop group 5 Family Click. 5 Family Click would later be featured on various mixtapes and productions in future Kool G Rap works.

== Track listing ==
1. "Intro" 1:07
2. "I Die 4 U" feat. 40 CAL Hammerz, Glory Warz, G Rap Giancana & Ma Barker 4:44
3. "Cold World" feat. G Rap Giancana, Ma Barker & Angie Mendez 3:28
4. "Blackin Out" feat. G Rap Giancana 2:31
5. "Breaker Breaker" feat. 40 CAL Hammerz, Glory Warz, G Rap Giancana & Ma Barker 4:28
6. "Click Of Respect" feat. 40 CAL Hammerz, G Rap Giancana & Ma Barker 4:28
7. "Get da Drop on Em" feat. G Rap Giancana 3:41
8. "Gully" feat. 5 Family Click 4:06
9. "On My Grind" feat. Glory Warz & Ma Barker 3:31
10. "Pimped Out" feat. Dan Da Man & Ma Barker 4:21
11. "Slide in My Whip" feat. G Rap Giancana & Ma Barker 4:22
12. "Air U Out" feat. G Rap Giancana 4:02
13. "Niggah Nah" feat. Glory Warz 3:40
14. "Sick Wit It" feat. 40 CAL Hammerz, G Rap Giancana & Ma Barker 2:56
15. "Stop Playin Wit Me" feat. 40 CAL Hammerz, G Rap Giancana & Ma Barker 3:35
16. "I Am What I Am" feat. Ma Barker 2:42
17. "Takin Over" feat. G Rap Giancana & Ma Barker 4:00
18. "Never Gonna Let You Go (Bonus Track)" feat. Ma Barker & Angie Mendez 3:21

== Cover art ==
Featuring photography by Maya Hayuk and Art Directed / Designed by Keith Corcoran, the multi-page CD booklet featured photos of G Rap Giancana, Ma Barker, 40 CAL Hammerz and Glory Warz depicted as the focus of a law enforcement investigation.

== Charts ==
Chart (2003)	Peak position
US Top R&B/Hip-Hop Albums (Billboard)	99
