= Lee Moses =

Background information
- Birth name: Vincent Lee Moses
- Born: March 13, 1941; Atlanta, Georgia, U.S.
- Died: January 26, 1998 (aged 56); Atlanta, Georgia, U.S.
- Genres: R&B, soul
- Occupation(s): Singer-songwriter, guitarist
- Years active: 1966–1997
- Labels: Maple

Vincent Lee Moses (March 13, 1941 – January 26, 1998), known as Lee Moses, was an American R&B and soul singer and guitarist. His recordings in the late 1960s as well as his 1971 LP Time and Place, are highly regarded within the deep soul genre.

== Life and career ==
Lee Moses was born in Atlanta, Georgia, and attended Booker T. Washington High School. In the late 1950s he formed his first band, the Showstoppers. They became a popular live act in the Atlanta area, and were at one time the house band at the Royal Peacock club.

Moses moved to New York City in the mid-1960s, where he worked as a session musician and recorded with Johnny Brantley, who co-wrote and produced his first single, "My Adorable One", in 1965. In 1967, he recorded three singles – all commercially unsuccessful – for the Musicor label, including "Bad Girl", and an instrumental version of The Four Tops' "Reach Out, I'll Be There". He also recorded a version of "Dark End of the Street", issued by Gates Records (probably in 1969). Moses' guitar style has been described as "funky" and likened to that of Jimi Hendrix, a contemporary of his on the club scene of the mid-1960s. He has also been praised for his "rough and powerful deep soul singing style".

In 1970, Moses released a single, "Time and Place", on the Maple label, a subsidiary of All Platinum Records. This was followed by a nine-track LP of the same name - also produced by Brantley - that included his versions of several classic songs of the period including "Hey Joe" and "California Dreaming". The album featured several members of The Ohio Players, as well as Moses' own band, the Diciples (sic). Although the album has since been described as "a revered and highly sought-after lost treasure for deep soul fans and collectors," it was a commercial failure at the time.

Moses also worked with fellow Atlanta native The Mighty Hannibal on his 1973 album, Truth. He returned to Atlanta in the early 1970s, and continued to perform locally, but did not record again. He died there from lung cancer in 1998.

In 2007, Castle Music issued a CD anthology of all Moses' recordings, under the title Time and Place. In 2020, Simon David released the documentary Time and Place.

On May 24, 2019, Colemine Records released the LP How Much Longer Must I Wait? Singles & Rarities 1965–1972.

== Discography ==
=== Studio albums ===
- Time and Place (1971)

=== Compilation albums ===
- Time and Place (2007)
- How Much Longer Must I Wait? Singles & Rarities 1965–1972 (2019, Colemine Records)

=== Singles ===
- "Free At Last" b/w "Got That Will"
- "Never In My Life" b/w "If Loving You Is a Crime (I'll Always Be Guilty)"
- "Diana (From N.Y.C.)" b/w "My Adorable One"
- "Dark End of the Street" b/w "She's a Bad Girl"
- "I'm Sad About It" b/w "How Much Longer Must I Wait" (1967)
- "Reach Out, I'll Be There" b/w "Day Tripper" (1967)
- "Bad Girl (Part I)" b/w "Bad Girl (Part II)" (1967)
- "Time and Place" b/w "I Can't Take No Chances" (1970)
