= Son of G Rap =

2018 album by 38 Spesh and Kool G Rap

Studio album by 38 Spesh and Kool G Rap
- Released: July 6, 2018 (soft release); July 20, 2018 (worldwide)
- Genre: East Coast hip hop; gangsta rap; mafioso rap
- Label: TCF Music Group
- Producer: DJ Premier; Pete Rock; The Alchemist; Showbiz; Midnite; 38 Spesh; Naughty Shorts; Daringer; I.D.

38 Spesh chronology
Stabbed & Shot (2018)	Son of G Rap (2018)	In the Mob We Trust (2018)

Kool G Rap chronology
Return of the Don (2017)	Son of G Rap (2018)	Last of a Dying Breed (2022)

Son of G Rap is a collaborative album by hip hop artists 38 Spesh and Kool G Rap. The two rappers first worked together in 2014, when they released the DJ Premier-produced cut entitled "The Meeting" (which is also featured on this album). However, they would not finish their entire project until four years later, in 2018.

The project was first announced by 38 Spesh on social media on April 1, 2018. The album had a soft release on July 6, 2018, only being available on websites such as Bandcamp and YouTube and Hip Hop DX. The album was officially released on all streaming services, as well as physical and digital retailers on July 20, 2018.

Son of G Rap features vocals from 38 Spesh on all 15 tracks, with Kool G Rap appearing on 9 of the 15 tracks. The album is considered an homage to the impact Kool G Rap has made on the culture of Hip Hop and a passing of the torch to the younger artist 38 Spesh.

== Track listing ==
No.	Title	Producer	Length
1.	"Intro"	Midnite	2:14
2.	"Upstate 2 Queens"	38 Spesh	2:55
3.	"Land Mine" (featuring Ransom)	The Alchemist	2:18
4.	"Shame"	Naughty Shorts	3:06
5.	"G Heist"	Daringer	2:25
6.	"Dead or Alive" (featuring Cormega)	Midnite	3:43
7.	"The Meeting (Problems or Peace)"	DJ Premier	3:48
8.	"Binoculars" (featuring N.O.R.E., Vado and Benny the Butcher)	I.D.	4:06
9.	"Nothin Gonna Change" (featuring Emanny)	Midnite	2:58
10.	"Bricks at the Pen"	Showbiz	3:23
11.	"Flow Gods" (featuring Freddie Gibbs and Meyhem Lauren)	Pete Rock	3:10
12.	"Heartless" (featuring Dwayne Collins)	38 Spesh	4:00
13.	"Honest Truth" (featuring AZ)	Midnite	2:50
14.	"Young 1's" (featuring Che'Noir and Anthony Hamilton)	DJ Premier	3:30
15.	"Aborted Child"	Pete Rock	2:43
