= Burn the Negative =

English band from Carlisle

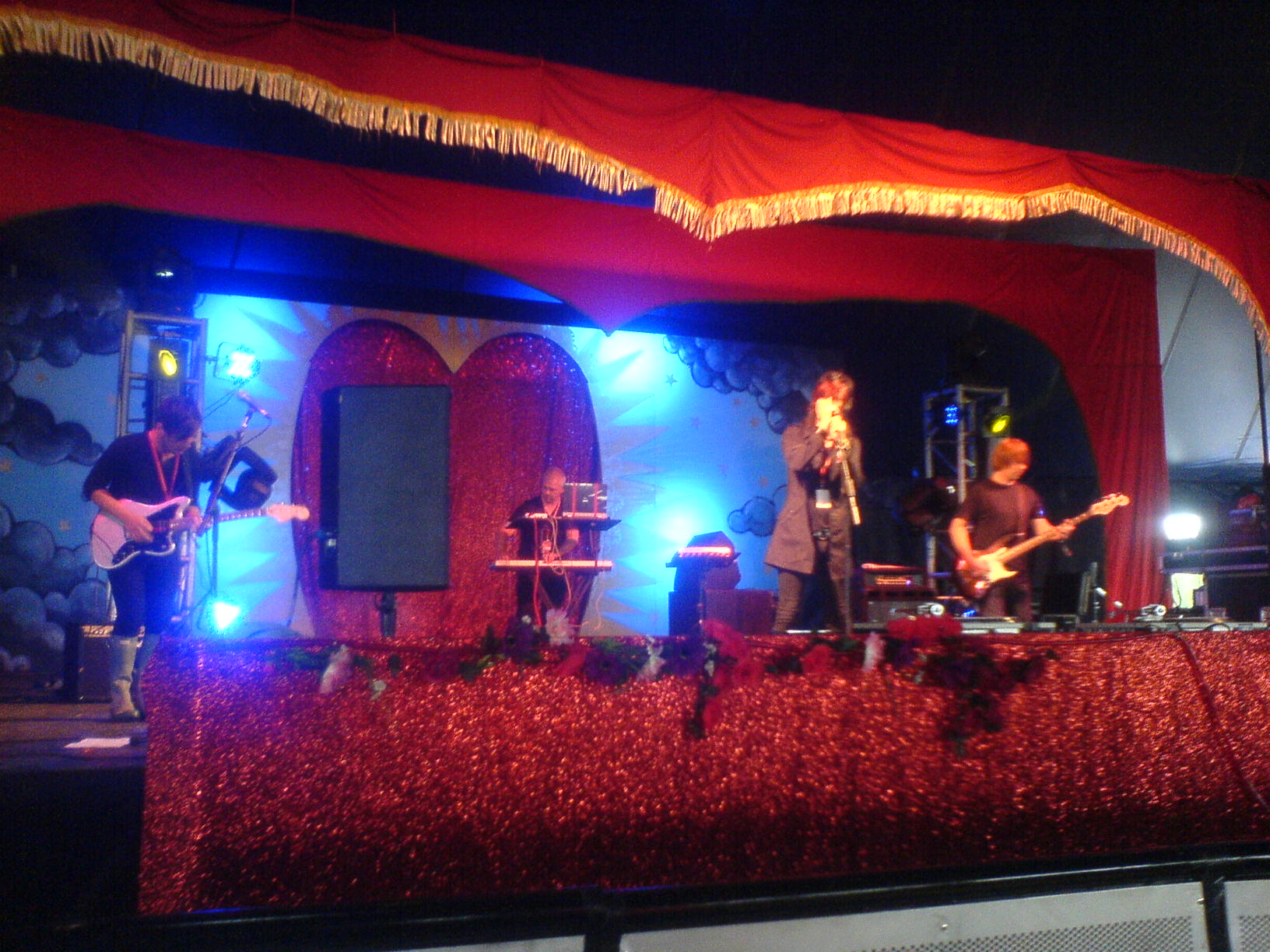
- Burn the Negative performing at the Dance Lounge, Glastonbury Festival 2009

Background information
- Origin: Carlisle, England
- Genres: Synthpop, Dance-punk
- Years active: 2008–2011
- Label: Gung-Ho! Recordings
- Members: Mark Baker; Paolo Di Liberto; Gareth Milburn; Lee Smith
- Past members: Gary Little (2008-2010); Dave Oliver (2008)
- Website: http://burnthenegative.co.uk

Burn the Negative are an English dance-punk group from Carlisle, England, currently signed to Gung-Ho! Recordings. The band consists of Mark Baker (vocals), Paolo Di Liberto (synths), Gareth Milburn (bass, synths) and Lee Smith (guitar, backing vocals). The band have released three singles and two albums, In The Atmosphere and How to Weigh the Human Soul.

== History ==
Baker and founder member Gary Little had collaborated on dance material since 1993 under various names, most notably Lil' Devious and Percy Filth. Lil' Devious' 2001 track "Come Home" was number one in the UK's dance, house and DJ charts and a hit in Italy, Spain, Japan and Australia. Baker would usually record guide vocals for their tracks which were then re-recorded by other vocalists. When the guide vocals for new track "You Control Me" (later included on their debut album) received such a positive reaction, it was decided to keep them. Baker and Little decided to form a band around this new material and Milburn and Smith joined.

Burn the Negative's first gig was at Spirit on Crosby Street in Carlisle on Saturday, 7 June 2008. The band signed to Gung-Ho! Recordings and recorded their debut album during 2008 at Brunton Heights and Black Rock Studios in Carlisle. The album was mastered in October 2008 at Abbey Road Studios by Geoff Pesche. The album was described by Paul Lester of The Guardian as being "as consistently entertaining as anything the Killers have ever done".

The band released their debut single on 20 April 2009. Officially a double A-side, it contains album track "Wonder Why" and exclusive track "Sing Around Me". The single was available as a digital download and a limited edition red vinyl 7-inch single. The debut album followed on 4 May 2009. The band played the Dance Lounge at Glastonbury Festival 2009. A 2 disc special edition of the album was issued in September 2009.

After recording their second album, How to Weigh the Human Soul, Little was replaced by Paolo Di Liberto on synths for live appearances. The album was preceded by a digital only single, "Smash & Grab" and was released in September 2010.

In January 2011 the band announced that they've split.

== Discography ==
=== Albums ===
- In The Atmosphere (Gung-Ho! Recordings GENGHISCD008), 4 May 2009
- How to Weigh the Human Soul (Gung-Ho! Recordings GENGHISCD013), 30 September 2010

=== Singles ===
- "Wonder Why"/"Sing Around Me" (Gung-Ho! Recordings GENGHIS022), 20 April 2009

Digital release also contained Richard Murray Remix

- "Low"/"Don't Change" (Gung-Ho! Recordings GENGHIS025), 3 August 2009

Digital release also contained Luke Walker & Tom EQ Remixes

- "Smash & Grab" (Digital download only), 16 August 2010

Also contained Keith & Supabeatz Remix
