= Road to the Riches =

Studio album by Kool G Rap and DJ Polo
- Released: March 14, 1989
- Genre: East Coast hip hop; golden age hip hop; mafioso rap
- Length: 47:49
- Label: Cold Chillin'; Warner Bros.
- Producer: Marley Marl

Kool G Rap and DJ Polo chronology
Road to the Riches (1989)	Wanted: Dead or Alive (1990)

Singles from Road to the Riches
- 1. "Poison" Released: Summer 1988; 2. "Road to the Riches" Released: October 1988; 3. "Truly Yours" Released: 1989

Professional ratings
Review scores
Source	Rating
AllMusic	4/5 stars
NME	5/10
RapReviews	9/10
The Rolling Stone Album Guide	3.5/5 stars
The Village Voice	B+

Road to the Riches is the debut studio album by hip hop duo Kool G Rap and DJ Polo, which was released in 1989 on then-prominent hip hop label Cold Chillin' Records. The album is notable for being one of the blueprints for the mafioso rap trend with the title track "Road to the Riches," which received strong rotation on the TV show Yo! MTV Raps, and was later featured on the old-school hip hop radio station Playback FM from the 2004 game Grand Theft Auto: San Andreas. Most of the songs, however, are not crime-related. Other popular songs included "It's a Demo" and "Poison." In 1998, Road to the Riches was selected as one of The Source's "100 Best Albums".

== Album information ==
Kool G Rap and DJ Polo were members of the legendary Juice Crew, led by producer Marley Marl. The duo first premiered on Mr. Magic's Rap Attack radio show on 107.5 in 1986 with its first single "It's A Demo." They spent the next few years releasing singles, and eventually wrote and recorded Road to the Riches in 1988, but wasn't released until early 1989. The album showcases G Rap's signature multisyllabic rhyme style with lyric topics ranging from crime, materialism, braggadocio, to love. The production was entirely handled by fellow juice Crew member Marley Marl, who provided a more hard-edged style of production than that of his previous work.

Road to the Riches is often cited as the beginning of the mafioso rap genre, laying the groundwork for future hip hop stars such as Scarface, Nas, Raekwon, Jay-Z, The Notorious B.I.G., and AZ, among others, however the bulk of the album features battle rap lyrics similar to Big Daddy Kane or Rakim without the explicit mafioso or gangsta rap subjects of the title track. G Rap would begin expanding his vivid storytelling and organized crime themes on his next album, Wanted: Dead or Alive and especially on 1992's Live and Let Die.

According to the liner notes in the Roots' Phrenology, "Men at Work" was the song that brought the group together during a lunch period at their high school.

== Track listing ==
- All tracks produced by Marley Marl

#	Title	Songwriters	Performer (s)	Length
1	"Road to the Riches"	N. Wilson; M. Williams	Kool G Rap	4:48
2	"It's a Demo"	N. Wilson; M. Williams	Kool G Rap	4:27
3	"Men at Work"	N. Wilson; M. Williams	Kool G Rap	5:02
4	"Truly Yours"	N. Wilson; M. Williams	Kool G Rap	5:07
5	"Cars"	N. Wilson; M. Williams	Kool G Rap	3:07
6	"Trilogy of Terror"	N. Wilson; M. Williams	Kool G Rap	2:40
7	"She Loves Me, She Loves Me Not"	N. Wilson; M. Williams	Kool G Rap	5:21
8	"Cold Cuts"	N. Wilson; M. Williams	DJ Polo	3:52
9	"Rhymes I Express"	N. Wilson; M. Williams	Kool G Rap	3:47
10	"Poison"	N. Wilson; M. Williams	Kool G Rap	4:45
11	"Butcher Shop" (CD version only)	N. Wilson; M. Williams	Kool G Rap	3:44

== 2006 re-release track listing ==
- All tracks produced by Marley Marl

Disc 1

#	Title	Songwriters	Performer(s)
1	"Road to the Riches"	N. Wilson; M. Williams	Kool G Rap
2	"It's a Demo"	N. Wilson; M. Williams	Kool G Rap
3	"Men at Work"	N. Wilson; M. Williams	Kool G Rap
4	"Truly Yours"	N. Wilson; M. Williams	Kool G Rap
5	"Cars"	N. Wilson; M. Williams	Kool G Rap
6	"Trilogy of Terror"	N. Wilson; M. Williams	Kool G Rap
7	"She Loves Me, She Loves Me Not"	N. Wilson; M. Williams	Kool G Rap
8	"Cold Cuts"	N. Wilson; M. Williams	DJ Polo
9	"Rhymes I Express"	N. Wilson; M. Williams	Kool G Rap
10	"Poison"	N. Wilson; M. Williams	Kool G Rap
11	"Butcher Shop"	N. Wilson; M. Williams	Kool G Rap
12	"Radio Album Introduction"	N. Wilson	
13	"Radio Freestyle"	N. Wilson; Craig Morgan	Kool G Rap; Craig G
14	"Radio Interview"		
15	"Riker's Island Radio Promo"	N. Wilson; M. Williams	Kool G Rap
16	"Raw (Demo Version)"	N. Wilson; Antonio Hardy	Big Daddy Kane; Kool G Rap

Disc 2

#	Title	Songwriters	Performer(s)
1	"It's a Demo (Original 12" Version)"	N. Wilson; M. Williams	Kool G Rap
2	"I'm Fly (Original 12" Version)"	N. Wilson; M. Williams	Kool G Rap
3	"Riker's Island (Original 12" Version)"	N. Wilson; M. Williams	Kool G Rap
4	"Rhyme Tyme (Original 12" Version)"	N. Wilson; M. Williams	Kool G Rap
5	"Poison (Hip Hop Version)"	N. Wilson; M. Williams	Kool G Rap
6	"Poison (Dub Version)"	N. Wilson; M. Williams	Kool G Rap
7	"Poison (Remix)"	N. Wilson; M. Williams	Kool G Rap
8	"Men at Work (Extended Version)"	N. Wilson; M. Williams	Kool G Rap
9	"It's a Demo (Original 12" Version Instrumental)"	N. Wilson; M. Williams	
10	"I'm Fly (Original 12" Version Instrumental)"	N. Wilson; M. Williams	
11	"Riker's Island (Original 12" Version Instrumental)"	N. Wilson; M. Williams	
12	"Men at Work (Extended Instrumental)"	N. Wilson; M. Williams	
13	"She Loves Me, She Loves Me Not (Instrumental)"	N. Wilson; M. Williams	
14	"Men at Work (Acapella)"	N. Wilson; M. Williams	Kool G Rap

== Later samples ==
- "Road to Riches"
  - "Disciple" by Nas from the album Street's Disciple
  - "Bloodshed(Paint the Town Red) by the Harlem hip hop collective Children of the Corn on its only album, which was released years after the song was created and the group disbanded—Children of the Corn: The Collector's Edition.
- "Truly Yours"
  - "Go with the Flow" by MF Doom, from the album Operation: Doomsday.
- "Poison"
  - "Poison" by Bel Biv Devoe, from the album Poison.

== Charts ==
Chart (1989)	Peak position
US Top R&B/Hip-Hop Albums (Billboard)	29
