= Hood 2 Hood: The Blockumentary =

- DVD cover
- Directed by: Aquis Bryant
- Produced by: Aquis Bryant
- Narrated by: Aquis Bryant
- Edited by: Aquis Bryant, Brian Bradley and Omar Wicker
- Distributed by: Rich Kid Entertainment
- Release date: April 19, 2005
- Running time: 5 hours (2 discs)
- Country: United States
- Language: English

Hood 2 Hood: The Blockumentary is a straight-to-DVD documentary about the subculture of inner-city street gangs in American neighborhoods, released in 2008. It was produced by Rich Kid Entertainment.

== Overview ==
The documentary takes a tour through American neighborhoods with high crime rates. Street gangs allowed Rich Kid Entertainment to capture the day-to-day actions of life in gang-ridden neighborhoods.

Rich Kid Entertainment traveled to over 29 different cities and neighborhoods which included the hoods that many music artists grew up in, such as Jay-Z, Eminem, Nelly, Eazy-E, Mac Dre, Michael Jackson, Three 6 Mafia, Geto Boys, Big Pun, Juvenile, T.I. and Nas.

=== Cities included ===
- Atlanta, GA
- Oakland, CA
- Richmond, CA
- Sacramento, CA
- San Francisco, CA
- Vallejo, CA
- Baltimore, MD
- New York, NY
- Birmingham, AL
- Chicago, IL
- Milwaukee, WI
- Compton, CA
- Detroit, MI
- Los Angeles, CA
- Gary, IN
- Harlem, NY
- Houston, TX
- Jackson, MS
- Kansas City, KS
- Kansas City, MO
- Las Vegas, NV
- Little Rock, AR
- Memphis, TN
- New Orleans, LA
- Omaha, NE
- Philadelphia, PA
- St Louis, MO
- Washington, DC

== Post release ==
The documentary aided police in investigation work against gangs. A Las Vegas man, an alleged member of the Gerson Park Kingsmen, has been charged with murder, attempted murder and conspiracy to commit murder.

== Sequel ==
A sequel titled Hood 2 Hood 2: The Blockumentary was released on July 8, 2008. Part three was released in 2013.

== See also ==
- Gangs in the United States
