= Road to the Riches (song) =

Single by Kool G Rap and DJ Polo

from the album Road to the Riches
- A-side: "Road to the Riches"
- B-side: "Butcher Shop"
- Released: 1988
- Recorded: 1988
- Genre: East Coast hip-hop; golden age hip-hop; hardcore hip-hop
- Length: 4:48
- Label: Cold Chillin'; Warner Bros.
- Songwriters: Marlon Williams; Nathaniel Wilson; Billy Joel
- Producer: Marley Marl

Kool G Rap and DJ Polo singles chronology
"Poison" (1988)	"Road to the Riches" (1988)	"Truly Yours" (1989)

Music video
- "Road to the Riches" on YouTube

"Road to the Riches" is the second single from American hip-hop duo Kool G Rap and DJ Polo's debut studio album Road to the Riches (1989). It was released as a single with "Butcher Shop" as a B-side and later also featured on the compilation albums Killer Kuts (1994), The Best of Cold Chillin (2000), Greatest Hits (2002) and Street Stories: The Best of Kool G Rap & DJ Polo (2013).

== Background ==
The song is semi-autobiographic, rags-to-riches tale, with the first two verses detailing Kool G Rap's youth living in poverty and his life before becoming a successful rapper. The third and final verse warns of the dangers of living a life of crime. In a 2014 interview, G Rap stated that some parts of the song were true, such as him working a low-paying job in a Key Food supermarket and selling crack cocaine, while others, such as his father being a drug dealer, were fictional.

== Music video ==
"Road to the Riches" was Kool G Rap and DJ Polo's first music video. The video begins with G Rap sitting with his young nephew on his lap, and the boy tells him, "Uncle G Rap, when I grow up, I want to be a rapper and a gangster, just like you". G Rap discourages him, however, saying "no, no, see, you can be a rapper but can't be a gangster. You don't want to be a gangster". The next scene is in medias res and shows Kool G Rap and DJ Polo in a courtroom being sentenced by a judge. The rest of the video depicts them as powerful drug dealers, committing various violent crimes, before they are arrested in an undercover police sting and the video ends again with the courtroom scene, as they are led away to prison.

== Use in media ==
The song was featured on the 2004 action-adventure game Grand Theft Auto: San Andreas' soundtrack, playing on the fictional old-school hip-hop station Playback FM.

== Samples ==
"Road to the Riches" samples the following songs:

- "The Assembly Line" by Commodores
- "Stiletto" by Billy Joel

And was later sampled on:

- "Illegal Gunshot" by Ragga Twins
- "Android" by the Prodigy
- "Rotten Apple" by Operation Ratification
- "Fool's Gold" by Zion I
- "Pain the Town Red" by Children of the Corn

== Track listing ==
A-side

1. "Road to the Riches" (4:48)

B-side

1. "Butcher Shop" (3:44)

== Charts ==
Chart (1988)	Peak position
U.S. Billboard Hot Rap Tracks	16
