= 4,5,6 =

Studio album by Kool G Rap
- Released: September 26, 1995
- Recorded: 1995
- Studio: Bearsville
- Genre: Hardcore hip hop
- Length: 42:13
- Label: Cold Chillin'; Epic Street
- Producer: Buckwild; Dr. Butcher; Naughty Shorts; T-Ray

Kool G Rap chronology
Live and Let Die (1992)	4,5,6 (1995)	Roots of Evil (1998)

Singles from 4,5,6
- 1. "It's a Shame" Released: August 15, 1995; 2. "Fast Life" Released: November 14, 1995

Professional ratings
Review scores
Source	Rating
AllMusic	2/5 stars
RapReviews	8/10
The New Rolling Stone Album Guide	3/5 stars
The Source	4/5 stars

4,5,6 is the debut solo studio album by American rapper Kool G Rap. It was released on September 26, 1995, via Cold Chillin' Records. The album's title signifies the winning combination at the urban street game of cee-lo.

The recording sessions took place at Bearsville Studios. The album was produced by Dr. Butcher, Buckwild, Naughty Shorts, and T-Ray. It features guest appearances from B-1, MF Grimm, Nas, and Shawn Brown.

The album peaked at number 24 on the Billboard 200 and atop the Top R&B/Hip-Hop Albums charts. It was supported with singles "It's a Shame" and "Fast Life". The latter made it to number 74 on the Billboard Hot 100.

== Background ==
Following the critical acclaim of a three-album run with Thomas "DJ Polo" Pough, Kool G Rap chose to concentrate his efforts in a more underground direction, in continuation with the sound on his albums with DJ Polo. In early 1993, Kool G Rap separated from DJ Polo in the aftermath of the media controversy surrounding the cover art of their previous album Live and Let Die. The cover – which depicted two police officers being hanged – followed the "Cop Killer" controversy involving Time Warner and Warner Bros. Records. Warner Bros. Records ultimately refused to distribute Live and Let Die, resulting in the termination of its contract with Cold Chillin' Records. Live and Let Die was eventually released and distributed independently via Cold Chillin' in 1992. In 1995, Cold Chillin' signed a distribution deal with Epic Records, of which 4,5,6 was the first to be released under the new deal. It would also be Cold Chillin' Records' final release before it went defunct in 1997.

=== Composition ===
Kool G Rap recorded the album in Bearsville, New York, giving it a dark, grimy street sound.

The title track, "4,5,6," depicts the urban street game of cee-lo and how it is played, along with rhymes of a braggadocio nature and his success and skill at cee-lo. The song starts with the notes from Weather Report's "Mysterious Traveller," which are used throughout the entire song and give the song a very dark street sound.

"It's a Shame"
The first verse of "It's a Shame," Kool G Rap establishes himself as a heroin kingpin with themes of wealth, power, and extravagant lifestyle.

The single "It's a Shame" contains a prime example of mafioso rap themes and self-boasting. In the song, Kool G Rap portrays himself as a heroin kingpin from a first-person perspective, boasting of his wealth, power, and extravagant lifestyle. However, it is implied that he harbours a sense of remorse over his choice of trade, with Sean Brown on the chorus stating: "Now it's a damn shame, what I gotta do just to make a dollar / Living in this game, sometimes it makes you wanna holler".

The song "For Da Brothaz" details the falling of his friends and the unforgiving struggle on the streets of New York.

In the single "Fast Life," Kool G Rap and Nas Escobar (who also appeared on the front cover) rap about their business ventures and mafioso lifestyle. The video for the single revolves around the construction of the mythical "Fast Life Hotel and Casino."

== Track listing ==
No.	Title	Writer(s)	Producer(s)	Length
1.	"Intro"	Andrew Venable	Dr. Butcher	1:03
2.	"4, 5, 6"	Nathaniel Wilson; Venable; Wayne Shorter; Nasir Jones; Chris Martin; Eric Barrier; William Griffin	Dr. Butcher	3:21
3.	"It's a Shame" (featuring Sean Brown)	Wilson; Joe Davis; Milton Johnson; James Vanleer	Naughty Shorts	4:04
4.	"Take 'Em to War" (featuring B-1 and MF Grimm)	Wilson; Todd Ray; David Axelrod	T-Ray	3:54
5.	"Executioner Style"	Wilson; Kareem Kenneth Alston; Venable	Dr. Butcher	4:07
6.	"For da Brothaz"	Wilson; Ray; Erich Kleinschuster	T-Ray	3:45
7.	"Blowin' Up in the World"	Wilson; Anthony Best; Bobby Caldwell; Alfons Kettner	Buckwild	4:26
8.	"Fast Life" (featuring Nas)	Wilson; Jones; Best; David Townsend; Bernard Jackson; David Conley	Buckwild	4:55
9.	"Ghetto Knows"	Wilson; Davis; Shirley Brown; Johnson	Naughty Shorts	4:29
10.	"It's a Shame" (Da Butcher's Mix)	Wilson; Davis		3:10
11.	"Money on My Brain" (featuring B-1 and MF Grimm)	Wilson; Alston; Percy Carey; Venable; Herbie Hancock; Paul Jackson; Harvey Mason; Benjamin Maupin	Dr. Butcher	4:53
Total length:				42:13

Sample credits

- Track 2 contains samples from "Mysterious Traveller" written by Wayne Shorter as recorded by Weather Report and "N.Y. State of Mind" written by Nasir Jones, Chris Martin, Eric Barrier and William Griffin as recorded by Nas.
- Track 3 contains a sample from "Love Is for Fools" written by Milton Johnson and James van Leer as recorded by Southside Movement.
- Track 4 contains a sample from "A Divine Image" written and recorded by David Axelrod.
- Track 6 contains a sample from "Soulsides" written by Erich Kleinschuster as recorded by Art Farmer.
- Track 7 contains a sample from "What You Won't Do for Love" performed by Bobby Caldwell.
- Track 8 contains a sample from "Happy" written by David Townsend, Bernard Jackson and David Conley as recorded by Surface.
- Track 11 contains a sample from "Chameleon" written by Herbert Hancock, Paul Jackson, Harvey Mason and Benjamin Maupin as recorded by Herbie Hancock.

== Personnel ==
- Nathaniel "Kool G Rap" Wilson – lead vocals
- Sean Brown – vocals (track 3)
- Kareem Kenneth "B-1" Alston – additional rap vocals (tracks: 4, 11)
- Percy "MF Grimm" Carey – additional rap vocals (tracks: 4, 11)
- Nasir "Nas Escobar" Jones – rap vocals (track 8)
- Andrew "Dr. Butcher" Venable – producer (tracks: 1, 2, 5, 11), re-mixing (track 10)
- Joe "Naughty Shorts" Davis – producer (tracks: 3, 9)
- Todd "T-Ray" Ray – producer (tracks: 4, 6), mixing (track 6)
- Anthony "Buckwild" Best – producer (tracks: 7, 8)
- Steven "Steve Ett" Ettinger – mixing (tracks: 2, 3, 5, 7–11), recording (track 3), engineering (track 10)
- Carlton Batts – mastering
- Michelle Willems – art direction, design
- Sue Kwon – photography
- Donald Wood – production coordinator
- Awanda Booth – A&R
- Girard Hunt – stylist

== Charts ==
=== Weekly charts ===
Chart (1995)	Peak position
US Billboard 200	24
US Top R&B/Hip-Hop Albums (Billboard)	1

=== Year-end charts ===
Chart (1995)	Position
US Top R&B/Hip-Hop Albums (Billboard)	76

== See also ==
- List of Billboard number-one R&B albums of 1995
