= Roots of Evil =

Studio album by Kool G Rap
- Released: October 20, 1998
- Recorded: 1995 (Track 13 & 15); 1997–1998
- Genre: Mafioso rap
- Label: Illstreet
- Producers: Dr. Butcher; CJ Moore

Kool G Rap chronology
4,5,6 (1995)	Roots of Evil (1998)	The Giancana Story (2002)

Roots of Evil is the second solo album by Mafioso rap artist Kool G Rap, released in 1998 by Kool G's record label, Illstreet. It boasts two singles, "Foul Cats" and "Can't Stop the Shine", and reached No. 43 on the Top R&B/Hip-Hop Albums chart.

== Production and release ==
The album was recorded in Arizona, during a period of time where G. Rap was purposely avoiding New York. It was promoted with two singles, "Foul Cats" and "Can't Stop the Shine". "Foul Cats" tells the story of Kool G Rap being set up and his friend murdered by a rival gang. Seeking revenge, G Rap and his crew kidnap the girlfriend of one of the rival gangsters at gunpoint and force her to reveal her boyfriend's place of residence. They go to his home in Jackson Heights, Queens, where they find him sleeping on the sofa and awaken him by throwing a glass of whisky in his face. They then discover his heroin stash and kill him by giving him a fatal heroin overdose. When his girlfriend reaches for the phone and attempts to call for help, G Rap is forced to pistol-whip her and shoot her dead before he and his crew flee the premises.

"Can't Stop the Shine" features a chorus sung by R&B singer Miss Jones. The music video shows Kool G Rap and Miss Jones partying on a lavish yacht, and Kool G Rap surviving as assassination attempt by two hitmen in his villa.

== Critical reception ==
Professional ratings
Review scores
Source	Rating
AllMusic	3/5 stars
The Encyclopedia of Popular Music	3/5 stars
RapReviews	8.0/10
The New Rolling Stone Album Guide	2.5/5 stars
The Source	3.5/5 stars

Complex wrote that "G. Rap's rhymes are so richly detailed that they put you right there in the heart of the action."

== Track listing ==
#	Title	Producer(s)	Performer (s)	Length
1	"Intro"		*Interlude*	1:43
2	"Hitman's Diary"	Dr. Butcher	Kool G Rap	3:43
3	"One Dark Night"	Fade for Underworld Productions	Kool G Rap	1:45
4	"Foul Cats"	CJ Moore; Dr. Butcher	Kool G Rap	3:23
5	"Tekilla Sunrise"	CJ Moore; Dr. Butcher	Kool G Rap	4:31
6	"At da Wake"		*Interlude*	1:10
7	"Home Sweet Funeral Home"	Haji A.	Jinx; Kool G Rap; Papoose	2:51
8	"Mobsta's"	Fade for Underworld Productions	Kool G Rap	3:18
9	"Let the Games Begin"	Rich 5	Kool G Rap	3:28
10	"A Thugs Love Story (Chapter I, II, III)"	CJ Moore; Dr. Butcher	Kool G Rap	9:33
11	"Da Bosses Lady"	A. Evans	Camileone; Kool G Rap	3:54
12	"Mafioso"	Rich 5	Kool G Rap	2:51
13	"Thug's Anthem"	E. Thompson	Johnny 2 Gunz; Kool G Rap; Pokaface	3:46
14	"Da Heat"	CJ Moore; Dr. Butcher	Kool G Rap	3:34
15	"Can't Stop the Shine"	Kool G Rap	Kool G Rap; Miss Jones	3:58
16	"Cannon Fire"	Kool G Rap	Kool G Rap	4:11
17	"Outro"		*Interlude*	1:05
18	"Daddy Figure"	Fade for Underworld Productions; J. Stank	Kool G Rap	5:06

== Samples ==
- "Cannon Fire"
  - "Ballad for the Fallen Soldier" by the Isley Brothers
- "Can't Stop the Shine"
  - "What Cha Gonna Do with My Lovin'" by Stephanie Mills
- "Da Bosses Lady"
  - "He's the Greatest Dancer" by Sister Sledge
- "Foul Cats"
  - "Poor Abbey Walsh" by Marvin Gaye
- "Hitman's Diary"
  - "You Light Up My Life" by Jean Carne
- "Let the Games Begin"
  - "Have Mercy on Me" by the East St. Louis Gospelettes
- "Mobsta's"
  - "Ain't No Sunshine" by Tom Jones
- "A Thug's Love Story (Chapter I, II, III)"
  - "Mellow Mood (Part I)" by Barry White

== Album singles ==
Single information
"Foul Cats"
- Released: September 1, 1998
- B-Side:
"Can't Stop the Shine"
- Released: 1998
- B-Side: "Thugs Anthem"

== Charts ==
Chart (1998)	Peak position
US Top R&B/Hip-Hop Albums (Billboard)	43
