= Live and Let Die (album) =

Studio album by Kool G Rap & DJ Polo
- Released: November 24, 1992
- Recorded: 1991–92
- Studios: Cherokee; Westlake Audio; Paramount; (Los Angeles, California)
- Genres: East Coast hip hop; gangsta rap
- Length: 61:45
- Labels: Cold Chillin'; CC 5001
- Producers: Kool G Rap; Sir Jinx; Trackmasters

Kool G Rap chronology
Wanted: Dead or Alive (1990)	Live and Let Die (1992)	4,5,6 (1995)

DJ Polo chronology
Wanted: Dead or Alive (1990)	Live and Let Die (1992)	Polo's Playhouse (1998)

Singles from On the Run
- 1. "Ill Street Blues" Released: February 26, 1993 (commercial release); 2. "On the Run" Released: May 24, 1993

Live and Let Die is the third and final studio album by the American hip hop duo Kool G Rap & DJ Polo. It was released on November 24, 1992, via Cold Chillin' Records and features Big Daddy Kane, Bushwick Bill, Ice Cube and Scarface. The singles "Ill Street Blues" and "On the Run" both received consistent airplay on Yo! MTV Raps and BET's Rap City upon release.

Warner Bros. Records refused to distribute Live and Let Die as part of its deal with Cold Chillin' Records because of the lyrical content and cover art. Live and Let Die remained out of print until it was re-released and remastered with various bonus material in August 2008 by Traffic Entertainment Group, the current owners of the Cold Chillin' catalog. Over the years, several music critics have hailed it as an underground classic, due to Kool G Rap's intricate lyricism, and Sir Jinx's production.

Compared to the lyrical themes on the duo's previous albums, this album features an even greater focus on hardcore gangsta and mafioso rap lyrics. The violence and sexual content are much more graphic than on any previous Kool G Rap & DJ Polo album. Most of the songs feature vivid stories of some sort, many of them related to organized crime (especially the singles "On the Run" and "Ill Street Blues") and violent street crime ("Train Robbery", "Two to the Head"). There are also sex raps ("Operation CB", "Fuck U Man"), horrorcore stories ("Straight Jacket", "Edge of Sanity"), and even some socio-political commentary similar to Public Enemy and Boogie Down Productions ("Crime Pays"). The songs "Home Sweet Home", "Fuck U Man" and "Still Wanted Dead or Alive" act as sequels, respectively, to the songs "Streets of New York", "Talk Like Sex" and "Wanted: Dead or Alive" from the previous album.

== Conception ==
=== Background ===
After the release of Wanted: Dead or Alive, tensions arose between Kool G Rap and DJ Polo. Rather than using the same formula that he used on his two previous albums, Kool G Rap decided to give Live and Let Die a cinematic feel with each song telling a different story and providing backdrops for the respective scenes. He recruited several non-East Coast artists to assist him on the album, such as West Coast emcee Ice Cube and his cohort, producer Sir Jinx, and Southern emcees such as Scarface and Bushwick Bill (from the Geto Boys). Although the album was originally intended to be released in 1991; its original release encountered several dilemmas due to record label issues, and the album's controversial content. Cold Chillin' Records, which was Kool G Rap and DJ Polo's main record label, was caught up in a legal battle with fellow Cold Chillin' artist Biz Markie over sampling rights, and Warner Bros. Records, which was its distributor, was involved in the Ice-T "Cop Killer" controversy. Due to Live and Let Die's cover art and song content, both labels were reluctant to give the album a release, as they didn't want to get themselves into any more legal troubles. While the project was on hold, Kool G Rap spent almost one year re-writing and recording until the LP was finally released in late 1992.

=== Recording ===
The recording and writing process began in 1991 in Los Angeles, and continued into 1992. The album is considered by many to be the East Coast AmeriKKKa's Most Wanted, being that it takes the same approach that Ice Cube took with writing, recording, and collaborating with, and in a coast that he didn't reside (AmeriKKKa's Most Wanted was recorded in New York, and features several non-West coast artists, namely Public Enemy and its production team the Bomb Squad, though Ice Cube was a California native and resident—Live and Let Die was recorded in California and features several non-East Coast artists, by G Rap, a New Yorker).

=== Cover art ===
The original cover was to display Kool G Rap and DJ Polo robbing a bank, with the photo being in black and white through a surveillance camera's perspective. This concept was eventually dismissed, as every bank said that they would not allow them to take such a graphic photo in their buildings. The second option was to have a photo of Kool G Rap and DJ Polo hopping inside a van with sacks of money and guns. Although this idea was more promising, being that this photo would cost less, and they could easily do it inside a photo studio, there was a new policy that record labels were taking at that time, which didn't allow weapons on album covers. The third and final option was thought of by photographer George Dubose. The cover depicts Kool G Rap and DJ Polo in a warehouse dangling raw meat in front of a pair of rottweilers, whose leashes are tied to the legs of a pair of chairs, on top of which are two Tactical Narcotics Taskforce agents in nooses. It insinuates that as Kool G Rap and DJ Polo tease the dogs with the food, they run, pulling out the chairs and strangling the two undercovers. The album was eventually shelved because of this, and remained out of print until it was re-released in August 2008.

== Critical reception ==
Professional ratings
Review scores
Source	Rating
AllMusic	4.5/5 stars
Billboard	(Favorable)
Robert Christgau	(dud)
Rolling Stone	4/5 stars
The Source	3.5/5 stars

Although Live and Let Die didn't receive the same amount of commercial success and attention as some of Kool G Rap's other releases, it is widely favored among fans and critics alike. Andy Kellman of AllMusic stated, "A strong case could be made for Live and Let Die as Kool G Rap & DJ Polo's crowning achievement". He also went on to say that "The album is one story after another that draws you in without fail, and they come at you from several angles. Whether pulling off a train heist, venting sexual frustration, analyzing his psychosis, or lording over the streets, G Rap is a pro at holding a captive audience. All die-hard East Coast rap fans, especially followers of the Notorious B.I.G., owe it to themselves to get real familiar with this album". Jeff Chang from Trouser Press gave the album a favorable review and complimented the chemistry between Kool G Rap and producer Sir Jinx, as well as the album's overall lyricism and production.

== Track listing ==
No.	Title	Writer(s)	Producer(s)	Length
1.	"Intro"	Nathaniel Wilson; Anthony Wheaton	Sir Jinx; Kool G Rap	0:41
2.	"On the Run"	Wilson; Wheaton	Sir Jinx; Kool G Rap	4:40
3.	"Live and Let Die"	Wilson; Wheaton	Sir Jinx; Kool G Rap	5:16
4.	"Crime Pays"	Wilson; Wheaton	Sir Jinx; Kool G Rap	2:17
5.	"Home Sweet Home"	Wilson; Wheaton	Sir Jinx; Kool G Rap	2:37
6.	"Train Robbery"	Wilson; Wheaton	Sir Jinx; Kool G Rap	4:12
7.	"#1 with a Bullet" (featuring Big Daddy Kane)	Wilson; Antonio Hardy; Wheaton	Sir Jinx; Kool G Rap	2:36
8.	"Operation CB"	Wilson; Wheaton	Sir Jinx; Kool G Rap	4:28
9.	"Straight Jacket"	Wilson	Trackmasters	3:11
10.	"Ill Street Blues"	Wilson	Trackmasters	3:46
11.	"Go for Your Guns"	Wilson; Wheaton	Sir Jinx; Kool G Rap	4:37
12.	"Letters"	Wilson; Wheaton	Sir Jinx; Kool G Rap	3:40
13.	"Nuff Said"	Wilson; Wheaton	Sir Jinx; Kool G Rap	2:47
14.	"Edge of Sanity"	Wilson; Wheaton	Sir Jinx; Kool G Rap	5:12
15.	"Fuck U Man"	Wilson	Trackmasters	4:01
16.	"Still Wanted Dead or Alive"	Wilson; Wheaton	Sir Jinx; Kool G Rap	3:24
17.	"Two to the Head" (featuring Ice Cube, Scarface and Bushwick Bill)	Wilson; O'Shea Jackson; Brad Jordan; Richard Shaw; Wheaton	Sir Jinx; Kool G Rap	4:46

2008 bonus disc
No.	Title	Length
1.	"Ill Street Blues (Illest Version)"
2.	"Ill Street Blues (A Cappella Version)"
3.	"Ill Street Blues (Instrumental)"
4.	"Fuck U Man (Original 12' Version)"
5.	"On the Run (Dirty Al Capone)"
6.	"On the Run (Instrumental Al Capone)"
7.	"On the Run (Remix A Cappella)"
8.	"On the Run (Clean Al Capone)"
9.	"On the Run (Dirty Untouchable)"
10.	"On the Run (Instrumental Untouchable)"
11.	"On the Run (Clean Untouchable)"
12.	"Straight Jacket (Original 12' Version)"
13.	"Letters (Clean Edit Version)"
Total length:		1:53:37

== Personnel ==
- Nathaniel "Kool G Rap" Wilson – main artist, producer (tracks: 1–8, 11–14, 16–17)
- Thomas "DJ Polo" Pough – main artist
- Antonio "Big Daddy Kane" Hardy – featured artist (track 7)
- O'Shea "Ice Cube" Jackson – featured artist (track 17)
- Brad "Scarface" Jordan – featured artist (track 17)
- Richard "Bushwick Bill" Shaw – featured artist (track 17)
- Anthony "Sir Jinx" Wheaton – producer (tracks: 1–8, 11–14, 16–17)
- Trackmasters – producers (tracks: 9, 10, 15)
- George DuBose – photography

== Charts ==
Chart (1992)	Peak position
US Billboard 200	185
US Top R&B/Hip-Hop Albums (Billboard)	18
