= Wanted: Dead or Alive (Kool G Rap & DJ Polo album) =

Studio album by Kool G Rap & DJ Polo
- Released: August 14, 1990
- Genre: East Coast hip hop
- Length: 58:37
- Label: Cold Chillin'; Warner Bros. 26165
- Producer: Eric B.; Large Professor; Kool G Rap; DJ Polo; Marley Marl; Anton; Biz Markie; Cool V

Kool G Rap & DJ Polo chronology
| Road to the Riches (1989) | Wanted: Dead or Alive (1990) | Live and Let Die (1992) |

Singles from Wanted: Dead or Alive
- 1. "Streets of New York" Released: July 19, 1990; 2. "Erase Racism" Released: November 14, 1990; 3. "Bad to the Bone" Released: April 3, 1991

Professional ratings
Review scores
| Source | Rating |
|---|---|
| AllMusic | 4.5/5 stars |
| Chicago Tribune | 3/4 stars |
| Christgau's Consumer Guide | (2-star Honorable Mention) |
| The Encyclopedia of Popular Music | 4/5 stars |
| The Rolling Stone Album Guide | 4.5/5 stars |
| The Source | 4/5 stars |

Wanted: Dead or Alive is the second album by the hip hop duo Kool G Rap & DJ Polo, released on August 14, 1990. The album was released a year after the duo's debut, Road to the Riches, and received greater acclaim from most music critics. The singles "Streets of New York" and "Erase Racism" received notable airplay on Yo! MTV Raps and the former is credited by Nas as being influential on his song "N.Y. State of Mind" from his critically acclaimed album Illmatic.

Lyrically, the album shows a greater variety of themes, from the battle rap braggadocio that dominated Road to the Riches, to topics of crime, poverty, racism ("Erase Racism"), and raunchy sex rap ("Talk Like Sex"). Perhaps most significantly, there is greater emphasis on vivid descriptions of crime and urban squalor ("Streets of New York") and references to organized crime, gang violence, contract killing, and Mafia films (the title track, "Money in the Bank", "Death Wish"), which helped cement Kool G Rap's reputation as the founder of mafioso rap.

== Track listing ==
(*) denotes co-producer

| # | Title | Producer(s) | Time |
|---|---|---|---|
| 1 | "Streets of New York" | Kool G Rap; *Large Professor; *Anton | 4:20 |
| 2 | "Wanted: Dead or Alive" | Eric B; *Large Professor; *Kool G Rap | 4:35 |
| 3 | "Money in the Bank" (feat. Large Professor, Freddie Foxxx, Ant Live) | Large Professor | 4:59 |
| 4 | "Bad to the Bone" | Eric B; *Large Professor; *Kool G Rap | 5:22 |
| 5 | "Talk Like Sex" | Kool G Rap | 5:14 |
| 6 | "Play it Again, Polo" | Eric B; *Large Professor; *Kool G Rap | 4:07 |
| 7 | "Erase Racism" (feat. Big Daddy Kane, Biz Markie) | Biz Markie; *Cool V | 4:31 |
| 8 | "Kool is Back" | Eric B; *Large Professor; *Kool G Rap | 3:25 |
| 9 | "Play it Kool" | Eric B; *Large Professor; *Kool G Rap | 4:31 |
| 10 | "Death Wish" | Eric B; *Large Professor; *Kool G Rap | 4:05 |
| 11 | "Jive Talk" | DJ Polo; Anton | 4:35 |
| 12 | "The Polo Club" | DJ Polo; Anton | 4:01 |
| 13 | "Rikers Island" | Marley Marl | 5:33 |

== Charts ==
| Chart (1990) | Peak position |
|---|---|
| US Top R&B/Hip-Hop Albums (Billboard) | 34 |

== Rikers Island (single) ==
"Rikers Island"

Single by Kool G Rap & DJ Polo

from the album Wanted: Dead or Alive
- A-side: "Rikers Island"
- B-side: "Rhyme Time"
- Released: 1987; 1991 (re-release)
- Recorded: 1987
- Genre: East Coast hip hop; hardcore hip hop
- Length: 5:33
- Label: Cold Chillin'; Warner Bros.
- Songwriter(s): Marlon Williams; Nathaniel Wilson
- Producer(s): Marley Marl

Kool G Rap & DJ Polo singles chronology
| "It's a Demo" (1986) | "Rikers Island" (1987) | "Poison" (1988) |

"Rikers Island" is the second single from American hip hop duo Kool G Rap & DJ Polo, originally released as a non-album single with "Rhyme Time" as a B-side in 1987 and later re-released as the fourth single from the 1990 album "Wanted: Dead or Alive". It was later also featured on the compilation albums Killer Kuts (1994) and The Best of Cold Chillin' (2000).

=== Background ===
Produced by Marley Marl, "Rikers Island" is a hardcore hip hop song that warns of the dangers of living a life of crime and ending up in the Rikers Island jail where violence is a daily occurrence and even the toughest street criminals can be broken down.

=== Samples ===
"Rikers Island" was later sampled on

- "40 Island" by Noreaga featuring Kool G Rap and Mussolini

=== Track listing ===
A-side

1. "Rikers Island" (5:37)

B-side

1. "Rhyme Time" (6:29)

== Videos (added to 2007 Traffic Entertainment reissue) ==
1. Streets of New York
2. Erase Racism
