= Masta Ace discography =

This is the discography of Masta Ace, an American rapper.

== Albums ==
=== Solo ===
Album Information
Take a Look Around
- Released: July 24, 1990
- Label: Cold Chillin'
- R&B/Hip-Hop chart position: #38
- Singles: "Together"/"Letter to the Better", "Me & The Biz"/"I Got Ta", "Music Man"/"Ace Iz Wild", "Movin' On"
Disposable Arts
- Released: October 18, 2001
- Label: JCOR
- R&B/Hip-Hop chart position: #90
- Singles: "Don't Understand"/"Acknowledge"
A Long Hot Summer
- Released: August 3, 2004
- Label: M3
- R&B/Hip-Hop chart position: #82
- Singles: "Good Ol' Love"/"The Ways", "Beautiful", "Da Grind"/"Do It Man"
MA Doom: Son of Yvonne
- Released: July 17, 2012
- Label: Fat Beats
- Singles: "Slow Down"
The Falling Season
- Released: May 13, 2016
- Label: HHV.DE, M3 Macmil Music
- Singles: "Young Black Intelligent (Y.B.I.)", "Juanita Estefan"

=== with Masta Ace Incorporated ===
Album Information
SlaughtaHouse
- Released: May 4, 1993
- Label: Delicious Vinyl Records
- Billboard 200 chart position: #134
- R&B/Hip-Hop chart position: #32
- Singles: "Jeep Ass Niguh"/"Saturday Nite Live", "SlaughtaHouse"/"Style Wars", "Born to Roll"
Sittin' on Chrome
- Released: May 2, 1995
- Label: Delicious Vinyl Records
- Billboard 200 chart position: #69
- R&B/Hip-Hop chart position: #19
- Singles: "Born to Roll", "The I.N.C. Ride"/"The Phat Kat Ride", "Sittin' on Chrome", "Turn It Up"

=== Collaboration ===
Album Information	Ref.
Make Some Noise with Edo G: Recorded: 2004	
The Show with eMC: Released: March 2008; Label: M3 Records; Singles: "Leak it Out"	
Arts & Entertainment with Edo G: Released: 2009; Label: M3 Records; Singles: "Little Young"	
The Turning Point EP with eMC: Released: 2014; Label: M3 Records	
The Tonite Show with eMC: Released: 2015; Label: M3 Records	
A Breukelen Story with Marco Polo: Released: November 9, 2018; Label: Fat Beats Records	
Richmond Hill with Marco Polo: Released: January 26, 2024; Label: Fat Beats Records; Singles: "Certified", "Life Music"	

=== Compilations ===
Album Information
The Best of Cold Chillin: Masta Ace
- Released: May 22, 2001
- Label: Cold Chillin'
Hits U Missed
- Released: 2004
- Label: M3
Hits U Missed Vol. 2
- Released: 2005
- Label: M3
Grand Masta: The Remix & Rarity Collection
- Released: September 12, 2006
- Label: Funky Chemist Recordings
Hits U Missed Vol. 5
- Released: 2008
- Label: M3
Shelf Life Vol. 1
- Released: 2013
- Label: Chopped Herring

=== Singles ===
- 1989 - "Together" b/w "Letter to the Better"
- 1990 - "Me & the Biz" b/w "I Got Ta"
- 1990 - "Music Man" b/w "Ace Iz Wild"
- 1991 - "Movin' On" b/w "Go Where I Send Thee"
- 1992 - "Jeep Ass Niguh" b/w "Saturday Nite Live"
- 1993 - "SlaughtaHouse" b/w "Style Wars [Remix]"
- 1993 - "Saturday Nite Live [Horny Mix]" b/w "Saturday Nite Live [L.A. Jay Remix]"
- 1994 - "Born to Roll"
- 1995 - "The I.N.C. Ride" b/w "The Phat Kat Ride"
- 1995 - "Sittin' on Chrome"
- 1996 - "Turn It Up" b/w "Top Ten List"
- 1998 - "Cars" b/w "Keep Livin"
- 1998 - "Yeah Yeah Yeah"
- 1999 - "NY Confidential"
- 1999 - "NFL [Not For Long]"
- 1999 - "Express Delivery"
- 2000 - "Spread It Out" b/w "Hellbound [H&H Remix]"
- 2000 - "Brooklyn Blocks" b/w "Last Bref"
- 2000 - "Conflict"
- 2000 - "So Now U a MC?"
- 2000 - "Ghetto Like" b/w "The Outcome"
- 2000 - "Hellbound" (with Eminem and J-Black)
- 2001 - "Don't Understand" b/w "Acknowledge"
- 2004 - "Good Ol' Love" b/w "The Ways"
- 2004 - "Beautiful" (released with Koolade)
- 2004 - "Da Grind" b/w "Do It Man"
- 2006 - "The Hitman" b/w "Just Get Down" (released with Strick)
- 2007 - "Hurting" f/ The Problemaddicts
- 2012 - "Slow Down"
- 2012 - "The dangerous three" (with Brother Ali and R.A. The rugged man)
- 2017 - "Come a Long Way" (Son of Sam featuring Large Professor and Masta Ace)
- 2017 - "Come a Long Way - Extra P remix" (Son of Sam featuring Large Professor and Masta Ace, produced by Large Professor)
- 2019 - "E.A.T" (featuring Evidence, produced by DJ Premier, mixed by Marco Polo)
- 2019 - "Masta Polo" (produced by Marco Polo, B-Side of E.A.T single)

== Album chart positions ==
Year	Album	Chart positions			
Year	Album	Billboard 200	Top R&B/Hip Hop Albums	Top Independent Albums	Top Heatseekers
1990	Take a Look Around	-	38	-	-
1993	SlaughtaHouse	134	32	-	6
1995	Sittin' on Chrome	69	19	-	-
2001	Disposable Arts	-	90	-	-
2004	A Long Hot Summer	-	82	44	-

== Singles chart positions ==
Year	Song	Chart positions			Album
Year	Song	Billboard Hot 100	Hot R&B/Hip-Hop Singles & Tracks	Hot Rap Singles	Album
1990	"Music Man"	-	-	13	Take a Look Around
1990	"Me & The Biz"	-	47	8	Take a Look Around
1994	"Born to Roll"	23	33	5	SlaughtaHouse, Sittin' on Chrome
1995	"The I.N.C. Ride"	69	44	8	Sittin' on Chrome
1995	"Sittin' on Chrome"	84	67	16	Sittin' on Chrome
