= EMC (hip-hop group) =

American hip-hop group

eMC
- Origin: New York City, New York
- Genre: Hip-hop
- Years active: 1998–present
- Labels: M3 Records, Penalty Entertainment
- Members: Masta Ace, Wordsworth
- Past members: Punchline; Stricklin

eMC is a hip-hop crew composed of rappers Masta Ace and Wordsworth. Punchline was also a member, but he left the group in October 2014. Another member, Stricklin, died in 2026.

== Biography ==
Though not officially formed as a group until 2005, the crew came together in 2001 while touring together on Masta Ace's Disposable Arts tour. Ace described the group's formation in an interview with IllHillEast.com:

It came about back in 2001, I went on tour to promote my album Disposable Arts and on that tour I travel with Strick. Strick was from Milwaukee, where we found Tommy Boy at the time. And I also travel with Punchline. We ride on the road for about a month or so, we really just got to liking each other and over the course of the last 5 years we collaborated together on a lot of different records. You know, whether it be me and Strick or me and Words. Or Words and Strick. Or Punch and me. We just done so many different collaborations. I mean probably some in the area of 20 different records. That one, or two, or three of us had been on together. That one of us has been on a record that they done with me on my album and it just seems like the right thing to do. Also like some of the fan-sites it was kinda being spoken about before it was actually a reality. It became like a rumor. People was just like "Yo" and started putting it in the chatrooms that we was forming a group and at the time it wasn't even true and then we started talking about "yo, maybe this is a good idea, let's think about it." That's how it came about.”

== Career ==
In 2006, the group's first collaborative track was released online, titled "Four Brothers". eMC's first group effort, The Show was released on iTunes on February 26, and the CD release was on March 25. A single from the album, "What It Stand For", was released in July 2007, and is available for free download on the group's MySpace page. It features production from Nicolay.

On January 21, 2014, it was announced the group was signed to the newly re-founded Penalty Entertainment, which is run under Sony and distributed by RED Distribution. "Spun A Web" was their first single since the new signing, produced by David E Beats and released on February 24, 2014. It samples Coldplay's "Trouble", from their debut album Parachutes.

In October, 2014 Punchline left the group after many years. According to Masta Ace, Punchline "just wasn't on the same page as the three of us".

On February 20, 2015, the group announced their second full-length album, The Tonite Show, would be released on May 5, 2015, on M3/Penalty Entertainment/Sony Red. This was their first project as a trio.

== Artist history ==
=== Masta Ace ===
Masta Ace (born Duval Clear, Brooklyn, New York) debuted in 1988 as a member of the legendary Juice Crew. He released his acclaimed debut, Take a Look Around, in 1990. In 1992, Ace formed the crew Masta Ace Incorporated, and released two albums with the group, 1993's SlaughtaHouse, and 1995's Sittin' on Chrome. Save for a number of vinyl singles, Ace was missing from the hip-hop scene between 1996 and 2000, until returning with his acclaimed concept album Disposable Arts, which featured guest appearances from Strick, Punchline and Wordsworth. Ace returned again in 2004 with another acclaimed concept album, A Long Hot Summer, which also featured guest spots from his fellow eMC members.

=== Punchline & Wordsworth ===
Punchline (born in Lower East Side, New York) and Wordsworth (born in Brooklyn, New York) originally gained popularity through their appearances at the Lyricist Lounge & All That! open mic events. The two debuted as Punch-N-Words in 1998, making a number of guest appearances that year, dropping in on A Tribe Called Quest's The Love Movement album, Mos Def & Talib Kweli's Black Star album, and Rawkus Records' Lyricist Lounge, Volume One compilation. The duo released their self-titled debut Punch N' Words EP in 2000 on Mona Records, then continued their careers with guest appearances and solo efforts. Wordsworth released his solo debut album, Mirror Music, in 2004 to positive reviews. Punchline left the group in 2014.

=== Strick ===
Strick (also known as Stricklin, born in Milwaukee, Wisconsin) made his official debut in 1999, when he signed to rap label Tommy Boy Records. Strick was featured alongside Detroit MC Royce Da 5'9" on Tommy Boy's Black Label, and the two collaborated on the track "It's Over" from the Hip Hop 101 compilation. After his deal with Tommy Boy fell through, Strick began making numerous appearances on underground mixtapes, one of which attracted the attention of Masta Ace, who enlisted Strick for an appearance on his 2001 album Disposable Arts. Strick then joined Ace for the album's supportive tour. He also appeared on Ace's 2004 album A Long Hot Summer, and was featured on that album's supportive tour as well.

He died in 2026.

== Discography ==
Albums

- The Show (2008)
- The Tonite Show (2015)

EPs

- The Turning Point EP (2014)

== Past collaborations ==
- "The Booth", Strick (produced by Masta Ace) (from "Conflict" b/w "The Booth" 12", 2000)
- "Block Episode", Masta Ace featuring Punch & Words (from Disposable Arts, 2001)
- "I Like Dat", Masta Ace featuring Punch & Words (from Disposable Arts, 2001)
- "Something's Wrong", Masta Ace featuring Strick & Young Zee (from Disposable Arts, 2001)
- "Unfriendly Game", Masta Ace featuring Strick (from Disposable Arts, 2001)
- "Things On My Mind" Punchline & Wordsworth (from "Game Over II", 2001)
- "Family 1st". Punchline, Apocalypse & Masta Ace (from "Family 1st" 12", 2003)
- "F.A.Y.", Masta Ace featuring Strick (from A Long Hot Summer, 2004)
- "Travelocity", Masta Ace featuring Punch & Words (from A Long Hot Summer, 2004)
- "Not Fair". Wordsworth featuring Punchline (from Mirror Music, 2004)
- "Evol" Wordsworth featuring Masta Ace & Justin Time (from Mirror Music, 2004)
- "The Hitman" Masta Ace & Strick (from "The Hitman" 12", 2006)
- "Get U Awn" Chords featuring Masta Ace & Punchline (Garden Around The Mansion´´2006)
