= The I.N.C. Ride =

1995 single by Masta Ace Incorporated

Single by Masta Ace Incorporated

from the album Sittin' on Chrome
- B-side: "The Phat Kat Ride"; "4 Da' Mind
- Released: April 4, 1995
- Recorded: 1994
- Genre: Hip-hop
- Length: 4:10
- Label: Delicious Vinyl
- Songwriters: Duval Clear; The Isley Brothers
- Producer: Luis Vega

Masta Ace Incorporated singles chronology
"Born to Roll" (1994)	"The I.N.C. Ride" (1995)	"Sittin' on Chrome" (1995)

Music video
- "The I.N.C. Ride" on YouTube

"The I.N.C. Ride" is a song by American hip-hop group Masta Ace Incorporated. It was released in April 1995 by Delicious Vinyl, as the second single from Masta Ace's third overall second and with the group, their second studio album, Sittin' on Chrome (1995). The song was produced by Luis Vega and reached numbers 69 and 75 on the US Billboard Hot 100 and Cash Box Top 100 charts. The 12" inch vinyl contains remixes of "The I.N.C. Ride", as well as "The Phat Kat Ride" and "4 Da' Mind".

== Track listings ==
Information taken from Discogs.

A-Side

1. "The I.N.C. Ride" (Radio Remix) - 4:10
2. "The I.N.C. Ride" (Radio Remix Dub) - 4:11
3. "The I.N.C. Ride" (No Ends Mix) - 4:32

B-Side

1. "The Phat Kat Ride" (LP Version) - 4:05
2. "The Phat Kat Ride" (Dub) - 4:05
3. "4 Da' Mind" (featuring the Cella Dwellas - 4:46

== Charts ==
Chart (1995)	Peak position
US Billboard Hot 100	69
US Hot R&B/Hip-Hop Songs (Billboard)	44
US Hot Rap Songs (Billboard)	8
US Dance Singles Sales (Billboard)	10
US Cash Box Top 100	75
