= Denez Prigent =

French singer-songwriter (born 1966)

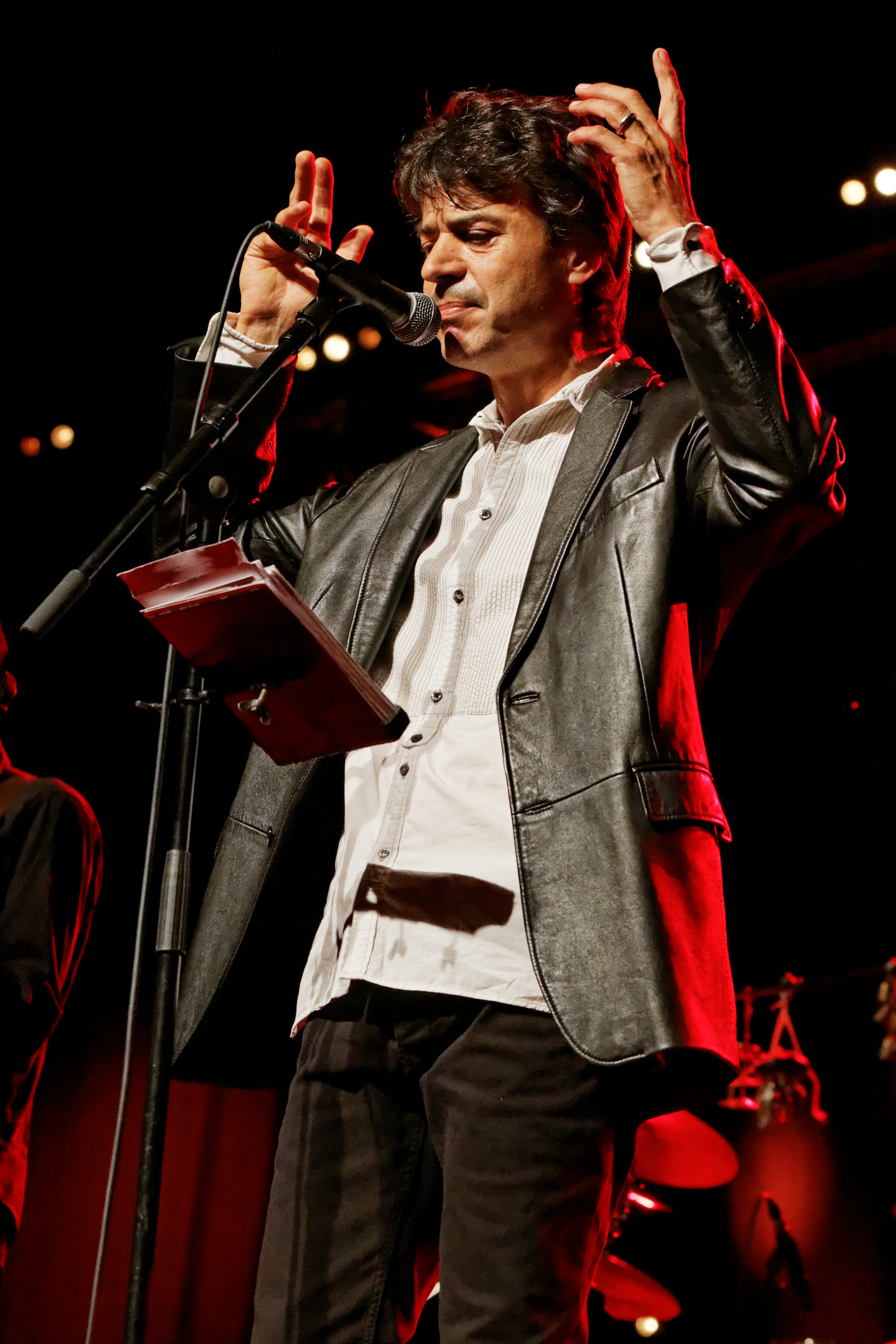
- Denez in Festival de Cornouaille (Quimper, Bretagne) in 2014.

Background information
- Born: 17 February 1966 (age 60); Santec, Bretagne, France
- Genres: Kan ha diskan; gwerz
- Occupations: Singer-songwriter; poet
- Instrument: Vocals
- Years active: 1980s–present
- Label: Barclay
- Website: www.denezprigent.com/

Denez Prigent (Breton pronunciation: [ˈdẽːnes ˈpriːʒẽn(t)]; born 17 February 1966) is a Breton folk singer-songwriter of the gwerz and kan ha diskan styles of Breton music. From his debut at the age of 16, he was known for singing traditional songs a cappella, and has moved on to singing his own songs with techno music accompaniments. He has performed in France as well as internationally and has recorded seven studio and two live albums.

== Biography ==
=== Childhood and early career ===
During his childhood, Prigent lived with his father in Le Relecq-Kerhuon and spent his weekends at his grandmother's, in Santec. His father, a primary teacher, raised him speaking French, although he spoke Breton fluently, because he did not see the point in teaching Breton to his son. Denez thus discovered the Breton language at his grandmother's, along with its natural harmony and the tendency of Breton speakers of that time to sing written or improvised songs. While in secondary in Brest he preferred listening to Breton songs on his portable audio player than concentrating on his studies.

At age 14, Prigent was taught kan ha diskan by Alain Leclère, himself a former student of Manuel Kerjean, whose other students include Érik Marchand. Two years later, in 1982, he sang with Alain Leclère in festoù-noz. In the Kan ar Bobl, he won the first prize in kan ha diskan in 1987, the first prize in new singing in 1988 and the first prize in traditional singing in 1990.

In 1988, driven by his passion for the Breton language, he became a Breton teacher in Carhaix, during which he was regularly invited in traditional music festivals such as the Tombées de la nuit (Nightfalls) and the Festival Interceltique de Lorient. In 1991, the city of Rennes invited him to participate in the "Voice of Asia" festival due to take place in its newly twinned city of Alma Ata, Kazakhstan. Surprised by this invitation, Prigent wrote a satirical song, "Son Alma Ata" (later included on Sarac'h) about the incongruity for a Breton singer to be sent to perform in Kazakhstan. This first concert abroad gave him an opportunity to discover the Kazakh people, then integrated into the Soviet Union, and compare its situation to that of the Breton people, integrated into France. In 1991, Prigent resigned from his teaching position in order to pursue his artistic career. While collecting the lyrics of traditional songs, he met Eugénie Ebrel born Goadec, one of the three Goadec Sisters who revived Breton a cappella singing in the 1960s. She provided him with the lyrics of "Ti Eliz Iza", and her daughter, Annie Ebrel, decided to join him on stage.

In 1992, Prigent sang a cappella during the Transmusicales, in front of an audience unused to this style. He subsequently left the band Daouarn with which he had sung in festoù-noz. He performed in the Montreux Jazz Festival, the Francofolies, the Midem, the Printemps de Bourges, the Coup de Cœur francophone in Quebec, the Mitte Europa festival, the Celtic Connection festival in Scotland, Expo '98 in Lisbonne, and the Eisteddfod festival in Wales.

=== Ar gouriz koar (1993) ===
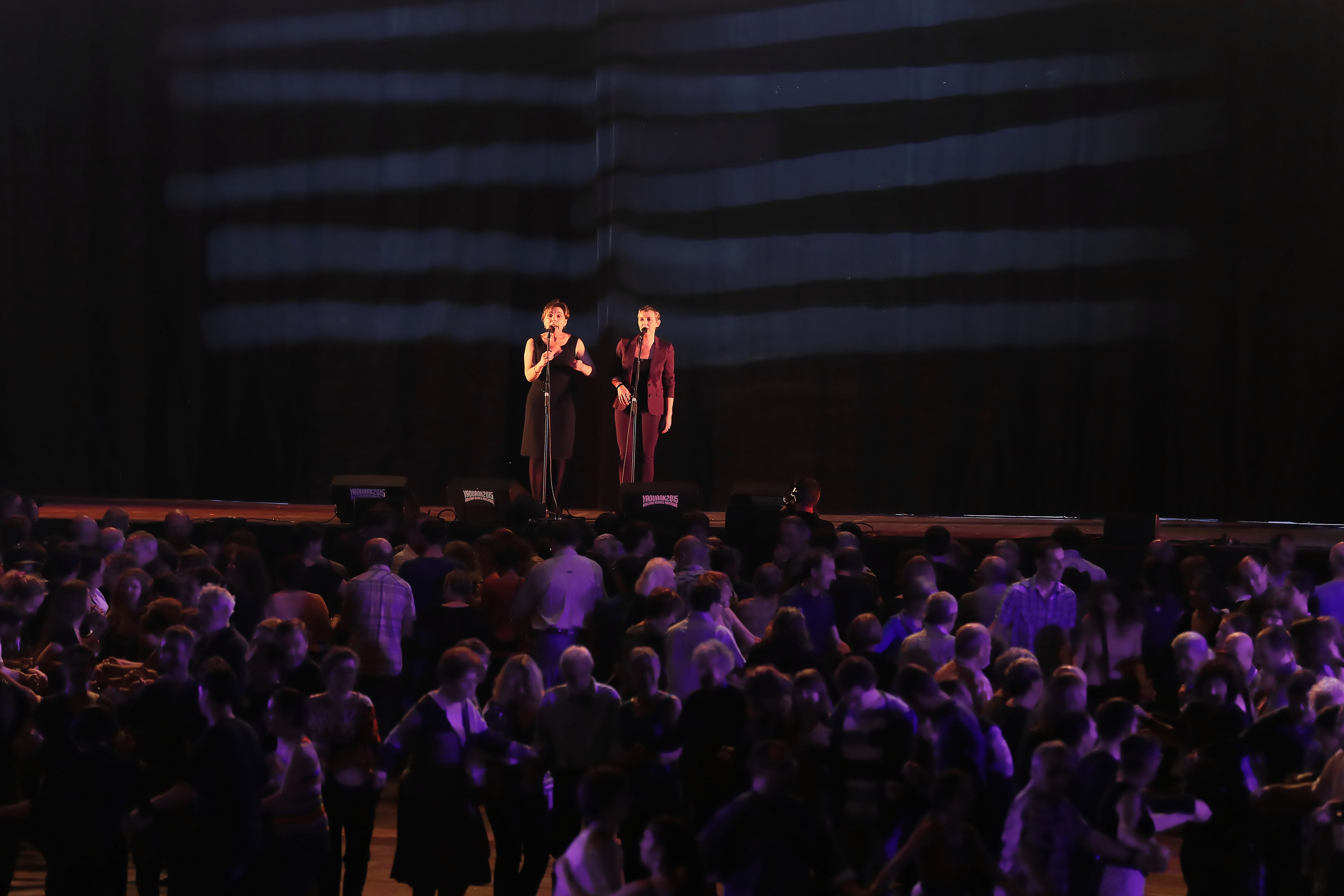
Kan ha diskan singers in fest-noz in Rennes (Yaouank Festival 2015).

In 1993, Prigent released his first album Ar gouriz koar (translated The Wax Belt) on Auvidis/Silex. Although the album was, at first, intended for promoting Prigent's songs to festival organizers rather than for being sold to the general audience, its sales approached 50,000 copies. Most of the songs are traditional Breton folk songs sung a cappella. However, former Storlok members Denez Abernot and Bernez Tangi wrote "Plac'h Landelo" and "Gwerz ar vezhinerien", respectively, while Prigent himself wrote "Gwerz an aksidan". Like all of his subsequent recordings, Ar gouriz koar is sung in the kan ha diskan and gwerz styles.

When Prigent failed to receive compensation from Auvidis/Silex for sales of the album, he sued the label and signed with Barclay Records for his subsequent releases. Further sales of Ar gouriz koar were blocked but Auvidis kept the original records, and in 1996 Prigent released a new recording of Ar gouriz koar with Barclay. For this and all subsequent recordings, Prigent uses the Peurunvan unified Breton orthography.

=== Introduction to electronic music and Me 'zalcʼh ennon ur fulenn aour (1993–1999) ===
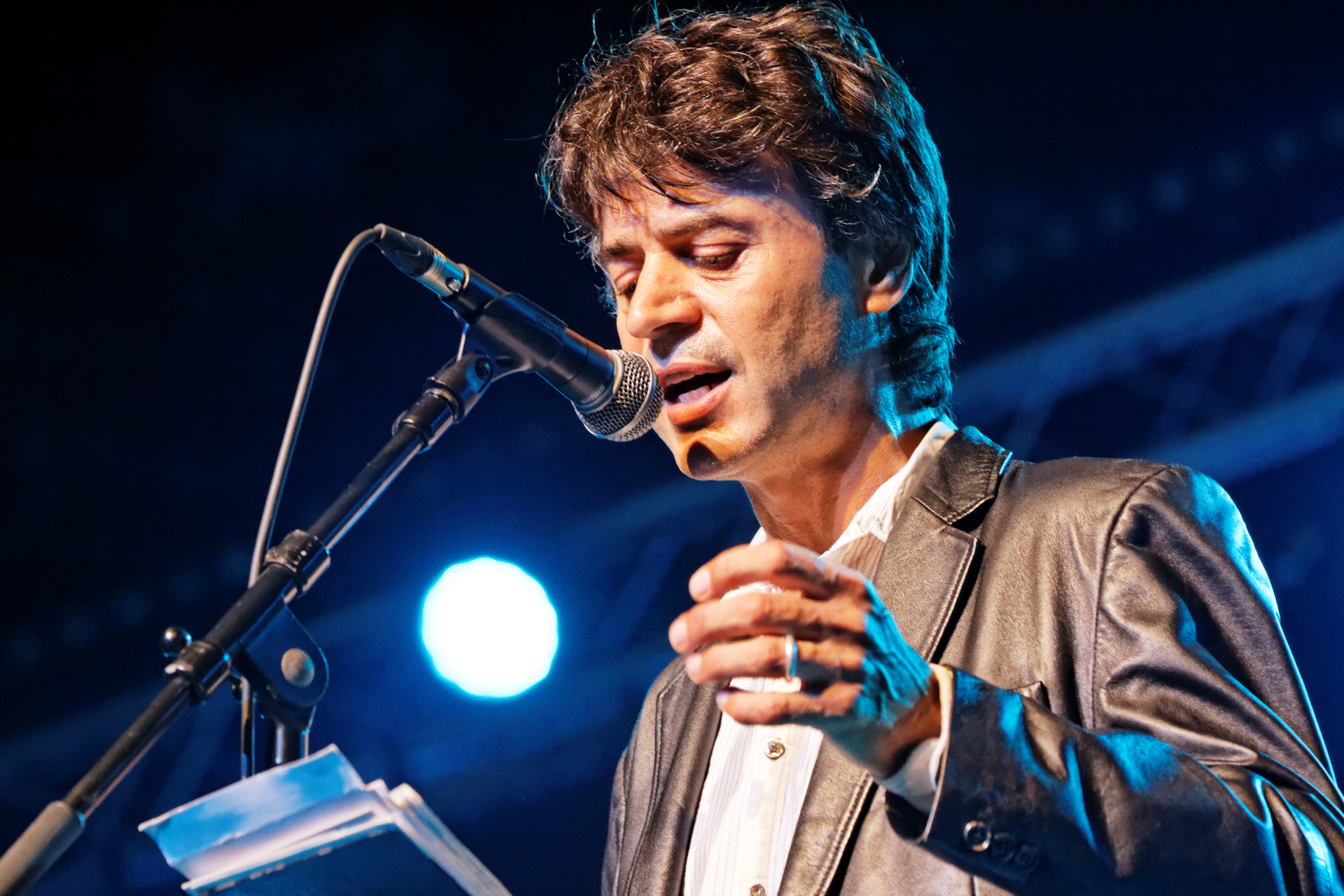
Denez on stage during Festival de Cornouaille in Quimper.

At his wife's request, Prigent attended the first rave party held in Rennes, in 1993, in spite of his negative prejudice. There, he discovered a music that, like Breton music, is primarily meant to support dancing. Noticing that electronic music and Breton music are based on similar rhythms and notes closed to one another, he contemplated using it to accompany his songs.

In 1995, Prigent appeared in Dao Dezi. The goal of this project of Éric Mouquet, a member of Deep Forest, and Guilain Joncheray is to treat Breton music in the same way that Deep Forest treated African music, with traditional lyrics and electronic accompaniments. Michel Sanchez, the other member of Deep Forest, also worked on the album, recorded and mixed by Erwin Autrique. Breton singers Arnaud Maisonneuve and Manu Lann Huel also appear on the album, as well as Tri Yann. It is Prigent's first experience combining Breton lyrics and electronic music.

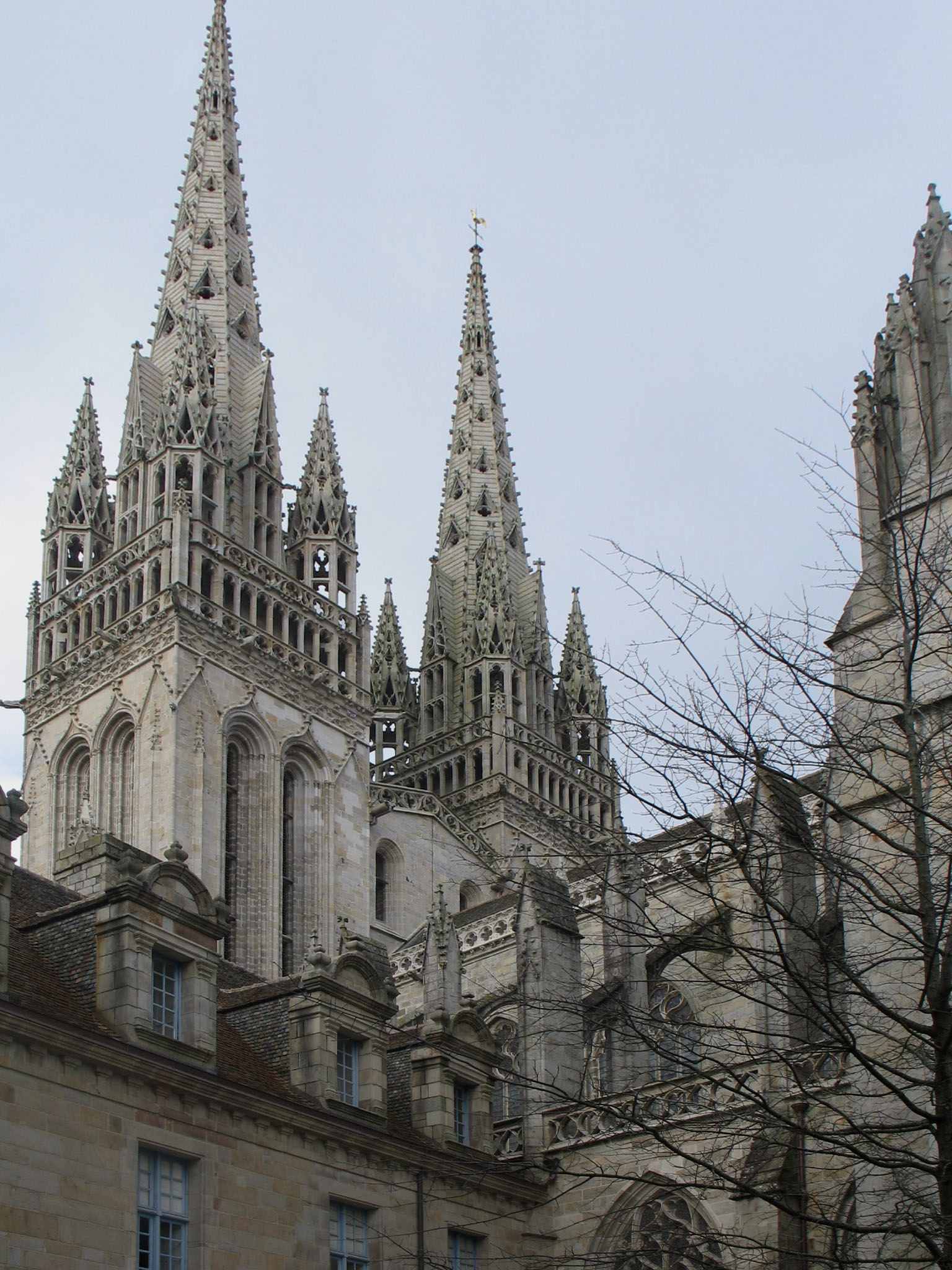
Quimper Cathedral, one of the stops of Tro Breizh.

Prigent released his second album, Me 'zalc'h ennon ur fulenn aour (I keep in myself a golden spark), in 1997. He wrote all the lyrics except for the traditional song Ar rannoù that appears in the Barzaz Breiz, and most of the musics, using both traditional instruments and electronic sounds. The subjects of the lyrics are the classical topics of gwerz : injustice, disease, death. E trouz ar gêr, about the artificial aspects of living in a city, and An hentoù adkavet, about the revival of the Tro Breizh, are his first songs devoted to Brittany, its culture and its relation to nature.

To select electronic samples, Prigent contacted Arnaud Rebotini, who granted him access to his collection of discs. Prigent mostly chose jungle sounds, finding that their rhythm, at around 160–170 bpm, was well adapted to Breton singing. In most cases, Prigent's voice was recorded first and electronic sounds were added afterwards. This combination of ancient singing and modern music is illustrated by Ar rannoù, one of the oldest known Breton texts, for which Prigent recomposed the traditional tune using electronic sounds. He compared this treatment of singing and music to that of Alan Stivell:

Folklore is death. Thanks to musicians like Alan Stivell, who quickly understood that academising Breton music would shortly condemn it, it is now completely anchored in daily life. Attending any fest-noz suffices to understand that we are not maintaining a dying fire. With this disc, I felt like showing a Breton's vision of the world today.

Although the extreme difference between his a cappella songs and his new tracks using electronic samples received mixed reviews, Prigent considered that he remained faithful to the arrhythmic, unmeasured aspect of Breton music. Particularly in gwerz, the singer must ensure that the intensity of the event being recounted comes first, and for this purpose, not sing in rhythm, but rather make pauses when appropriate. According to Prigent, a measured gwerz loses the identity of Breton singing, while an electronic accompaniment faithful to the arrhythmic song is perfectly natural. Similarly, he attaches a great importance to the traditional pronunciation of Breton, including the dibril, an alveolar trill used in sung Breton only. It is also essential for him to remain faithful to the writing rules of gwerz, with very long lyrics of which only a part is recorded, and its eternal topics that prevent this genre dating back to the 5th century from going out of fashion. Fidelity to tradition is absolutely not a way of imprisoning himself in his own culture; on the contrary, for Prigent, developing the Breton culture by adapting it to modern technology is a way of opening up to other cultures.

With this album, Prigent also affirms his writing style. His verses are mostly octosyllables with, generally, a median caesura. This type of verse is very frequent in Breton, since short words are common, and thus long verses unneeded. He only writes in Breton, a language that, according to Prigent, kept its sacred aspect, contrarily to French. As a consequence, some lyrics remain untranslatable, even for their bilingual author.

In 1998, he took part in Alan Simon's Excalibur, la légende des Celtes, with Roger Hodgson (the singer of Supertramp), Angelo Branduardi and Didier Lockwood.

=== Irvi (2000–2002) ===
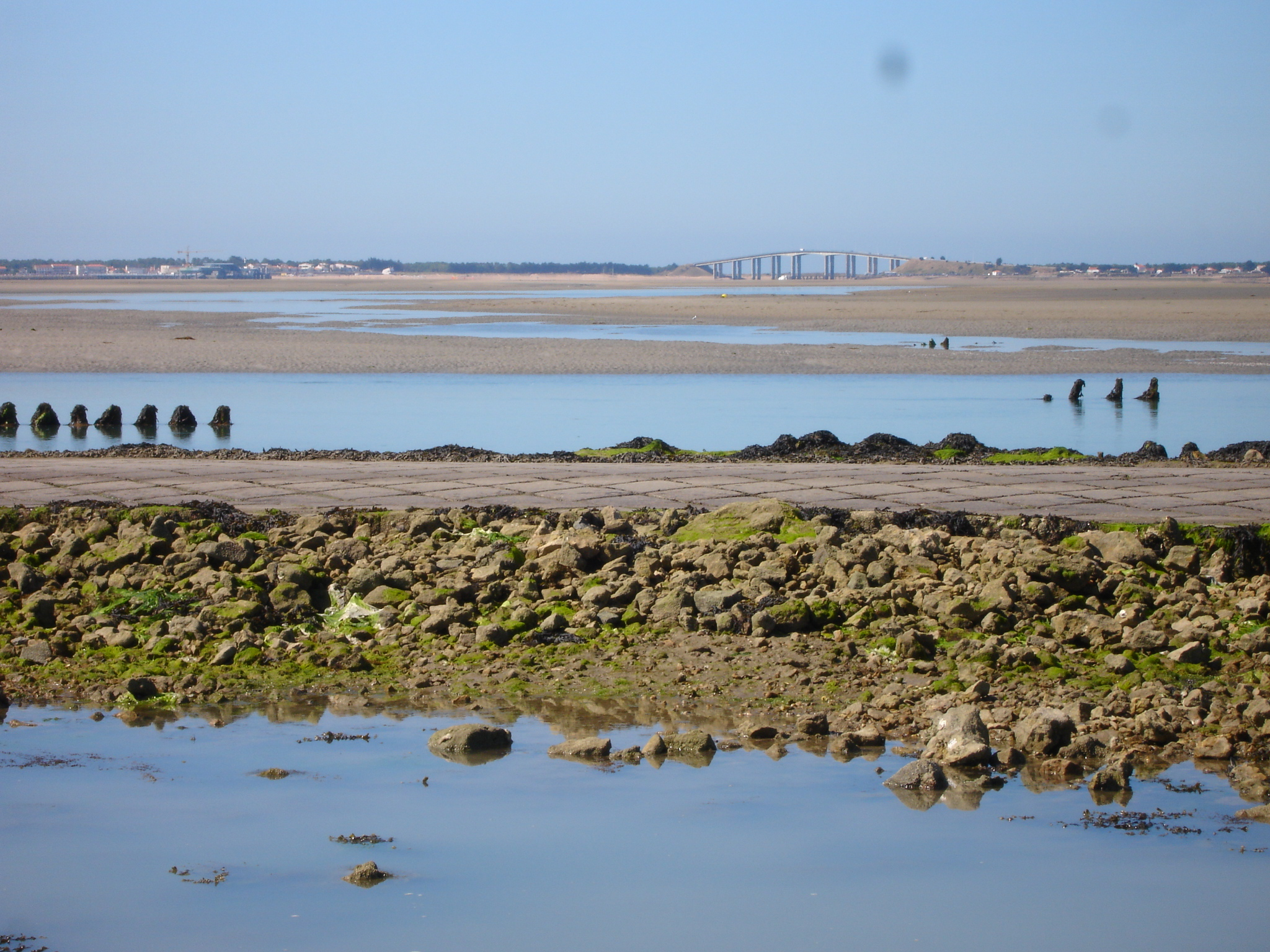
A path to a tidal island at low tide.

In 2000, Denez Prigent released his third album, Irvi. This title is the plural of the word erv, i.e. a foam path, meaning a path, only usable at low tide, that links a tidal island to the continent or to another island. The song Hent-eon (foam path) describes the wish of a man from Lesconil to be buried in such a path so that he will be watched over by nature. This idea of a link between two worlds, between life and death, also appears in Daouzek huñvre, where seven lost spirits clothed in flesh walk in line on a foam path.

Like in Me 'zalc'h ennon ur fulenn aour, Denez Prigent wrote all the lyrics, except those of the traditional song E ti Eliz Iza, on the bonus CD, and most of the musics, again using both traditional instruments and electronic sounds. The latter are more discreet than on the previous album; Irvi thus sounds less jungle and more new age. The main invited musicians are the jazzman Louis Sclavis, the viellist Valentin Clastrier, and the uilleann piper Davy Spillane.

For the first time, French lyrics appear on one of Prigent's albums. They are told by Bertrand Cantat on Daouzek huñvre, whose structure is reminiscent of the twelve series of Ar rannoù. The other voice that can be heard on this album is that of Lisa Gerrard, the singer of Dead Can Dance, on Gortoz a ran (I await). This song, the first one in the album, is part of the soundtrack of Black Hawk Down, a film directed by Ridley Scott. Gortoz a ran has garnered recent attention (2016) after being featured in the American adult animated sitcom South Park during the second episode of season 20: 'Skank Hunt.'

Another guest, the Bagad Kemper, performs with Denez Prigent on E trouz ar gêr and Ar sonerien du, a gwerz about the legend of the dark sonneurs, a couple of sonneurs (biniou and bombard) which the gendarmes arrested, mistaking them for thieves for whom they were looking. Both were hanged and buried in Pont-l'Abbé before their innocence was established. Their graves are, to this day, a location of pilgrimage. In Denez Prigent's version of the legend, the gendarmes kill and hang the musicians in order not to admit to having let the real thieves escape, also insisting on the reputation of debauchery which the conformists gave, at the time, to festive music.

This album was nominated for the Victoires de la Musique in 2001.

After a series of concerts, Prigent recorded a live album, Live Holl a-gevret !, during the Festival interceltique de Lorient in August 2001, guest-starring the bagad Roñsed-Mor of Locoal-Mendon.

=== Sarac'h (2003) ===
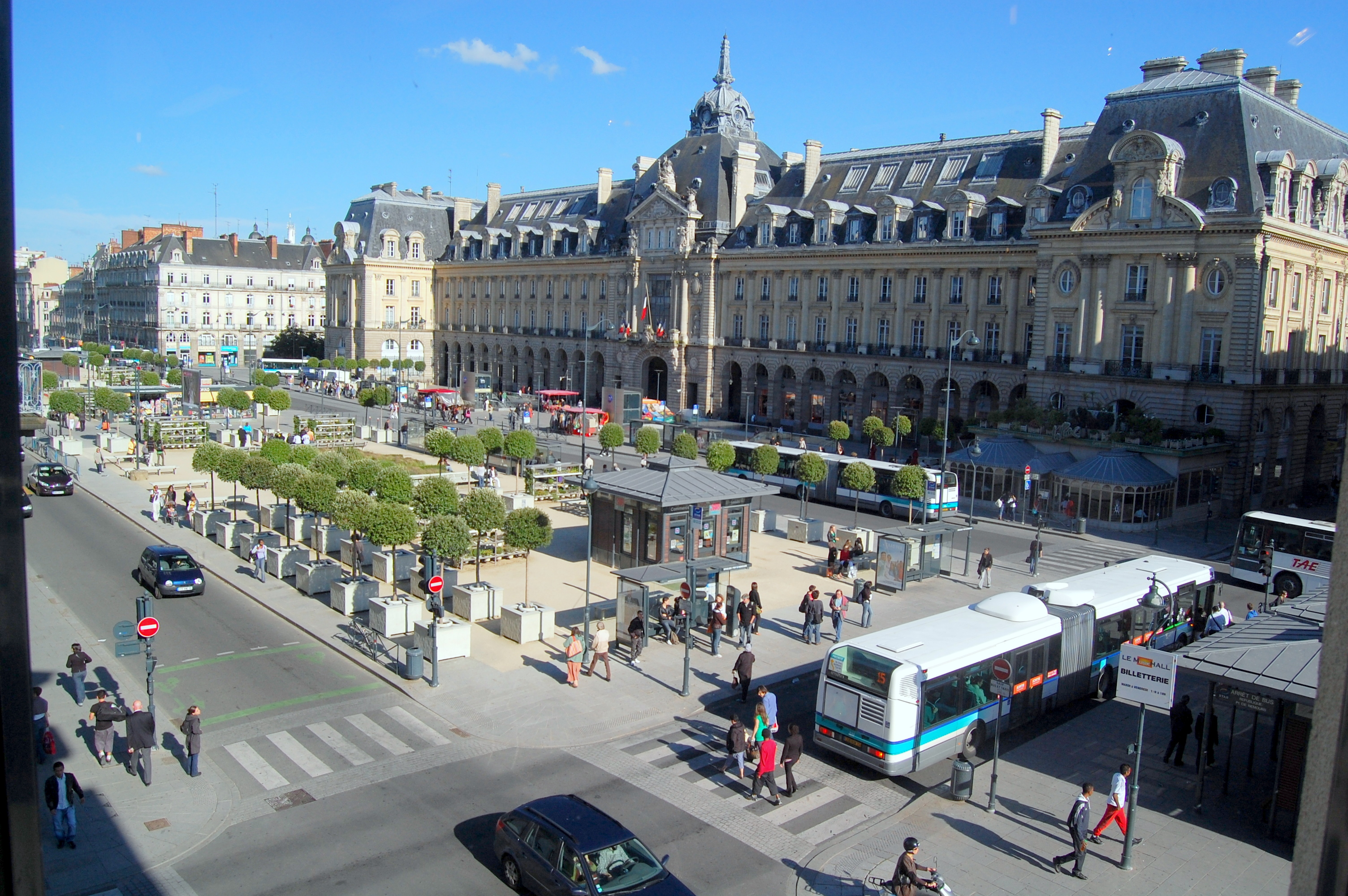
The urban setting of Rennes, which Denez Prigent sought to leave.

The next album, Sarac'h (rustle), was released in 2003. Lisa Gerrard is again invited, as is Yanka Rupkina, the soloist of the Bulgarian State Television Female Vocal Choir, Karen Matheson of Capercaillie, and the Sami singer Mari Boine. Also appearing are the Dónal Lunny on the bouzouki, Nabil Khalidi on the oud, and Farhad Bouallagi on the violin. Although this album uses electronic sounds, the music is mostly performed on traditional instruments.

The album begins with two traditional songs : An hini a garan, with Lisa Gerrard, and E garnison !, with Louise Ebrel, who had already toured with Prigent. Two previously unreleased songs written in the beginning of Prigent's career are part of the album, Son Alma Ata and Ar gwez-sapin.

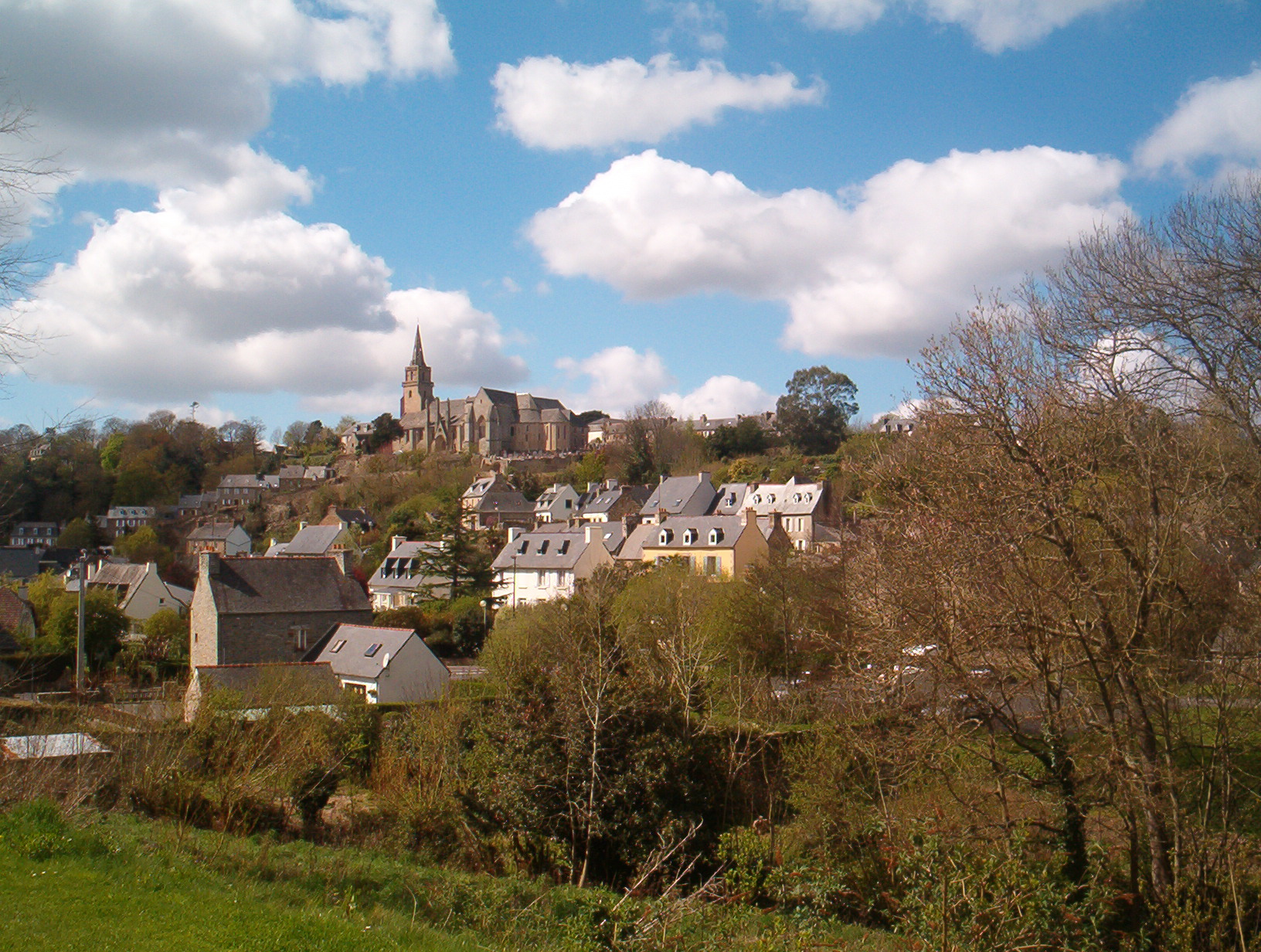
The costarmorican nature to which Denez Prigent returned.

Contrarily to the previous albums, Sarac'h contains very personal lyrics, in which the author writes about himself. N'eus forzh… is about the importance of singing, thanks to which Prigent never loses hope ("leskiñ a ra va zan atav" : my fire always burns). He also resumes a verse already used in E trouz ar gêr sums up his way of life: "n'eus ket un deiz na ganfen ket" (there is not a single day during which I would not sing). In Dispi, he expresses his very pessimistic point of view on the Breton language, an essential topic for Prigent, who only sings in Breton and taught this language. He describes his despair about this situation, writing that those who dreamt of a return to harmony between generations linked by the Breton language and culture were crazy.

The eponymous song alone sums up Prigent's main convictions. It relates his own return to nature, when, used to the never-ending noise of the cars on the highway next to which he lived in Rennes, he decided to buy a house in Lanvellec (Côtes d'Armor). He then rediscovered the silence of nature, with the rustle of the wind in the trees in the background. He drew from that the impression, from which he writes the song, that modernisation cuts people from nature and encourages them to stay alone behind their screens.

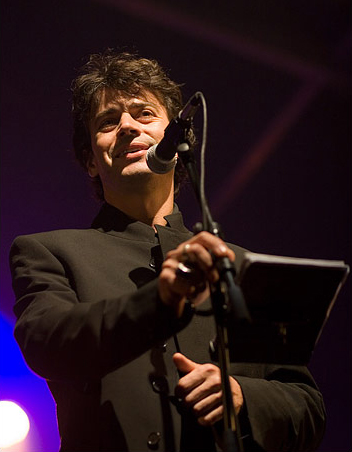
Denez Prigent in 2005.

Sarac'h received the best album award of the Breton newspaper, Le Télégramme de Brest. Gilles Servat, who gave him the award, expressed his admiration for Denez Prigent, who he described as "an artist emblematic of the renewal in Breton expression and in the search for new musicalities".

Since then, Prigent sang on such stages as the big stage of the Vieilles Charrues Festival, Rencontres Trans Musicales in Beijing, the Paléo Festival Nyon (Switzerland), the Rozrywki Theater in Poland, the Stimmen Festival (Germany), the antique Roman Theater in Vienna and the theater of Tenerife (Canary Islands). In Paris, he performed at the Stade de France for Saint Patrick's Day, in Bercy Arena, the Bataclan, the Casino de Paris and the Théâtre de la Ville with guest singers Mari Boine and Karen Matheson as well as Donald Shaw.

=== An enchanting garden (2012–present) ===
In summer 2010, he announced to write for a next album. A Best-of album is published in 2011 (Barclay Records). In July, 2011, the Het Lindeboom festival gives to him a blank in front of an audience of 25,000: it has the occasion for him to invite the Hungarian singer Szilvia Bognar, one of the great voices of the Eastern countries, as well as the famous Welsh choir Flint Male Voice Choir.

In 2012, he presented a new show, Beajet 'm eus (" I travelled "). On 7 April 2015, Denez published a new studio album, "An enchanting garden - Ul liorzh vurzhudus". This album, comprising 12 original songs written by the singer, including one in English, is the result of several years of writing (a hundred gwerzioù of 80 verses), trips and experiments on stage. The Breton and Celtic themes, unstructured, are interwoven with Slavonic and Armenian ("An tri seblant"), Greek ("Krediñ 'raen"), Andalusian ("Ar binioù skornet"), Bossa nova ("An tri amourouz"), Gypsy or Yiddish ("Beajet'm eus"), African ("An trucher hag an Ankoù") for an entirely acoustic music. In songs in Breton, the artist invites to discover the corners of his inner garden and the plurality of his influences. Denez's vocal, "enigmatic and inspiring" (accompanied by the hang on "Before dawn"), is like a link between the real and the invisible, supported by the writing of timeless stories, sometimes tragic, satirical or burlesque, such as "Peñse Nedeleg", a Fisel dance describing the shipwreck of a freighter that makes the happiness of the inhabitants for Christmas or "An tri amourouz" whose black humor recalls that of Tim Burton. "An Old Story", in English, couples with "Gwechall gozh", in breton, two complaints sharing the same story: an innocent woman burnt like witch for having too many companions.

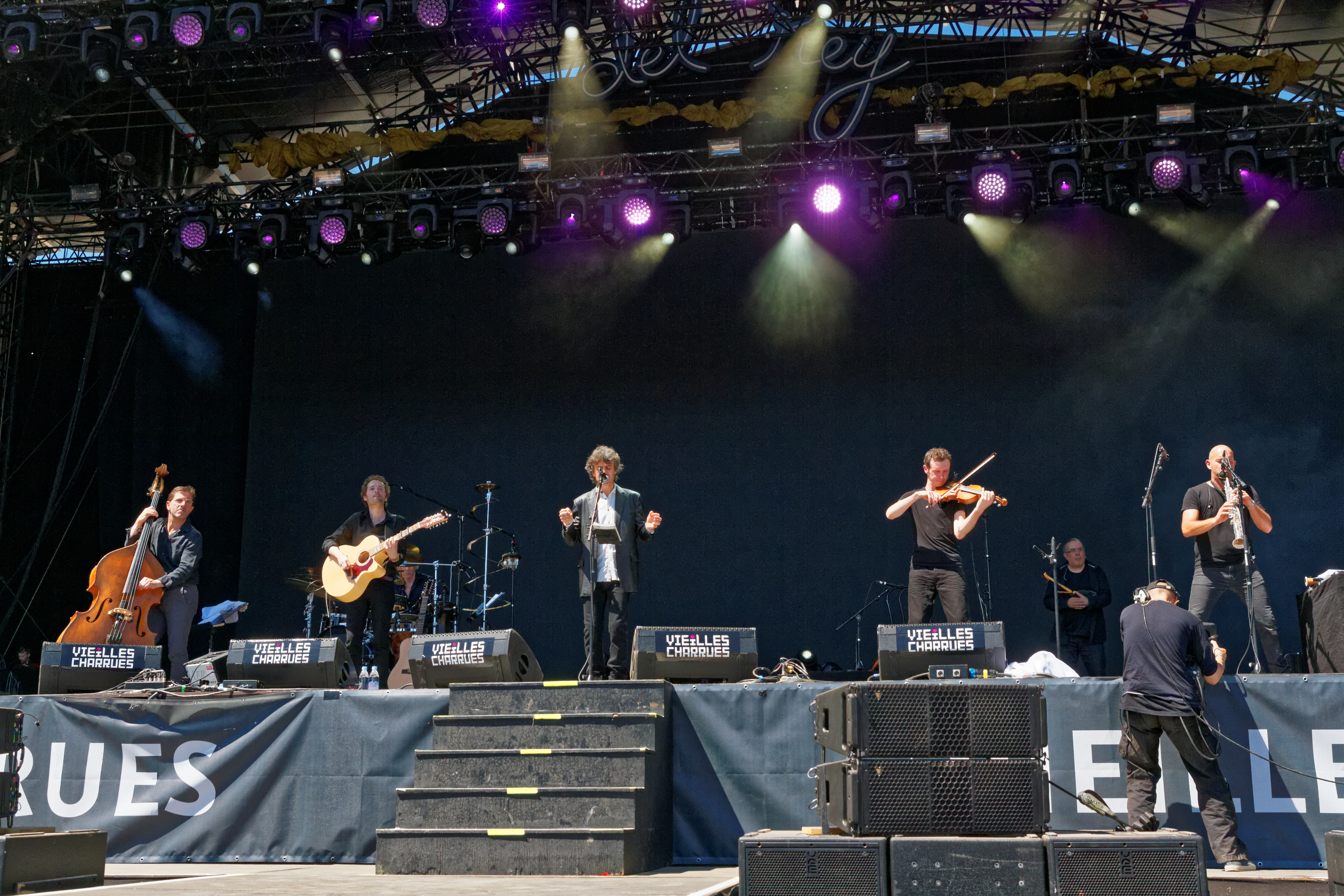
Denez and his musicians on biggest stage of Vieilles Charrues Festival in 2016.

In November 2015, beatmaker James Digger remixed 4 tracks for an EP. It appealed to rapper Masta Ace, emblematic figure of Hip Hop, one of the references of Eminem. In exchange, Denez participated in May 2016 to his album "The Falling Season", under "Story of Me". His song "Gortoz a Ran" is used for two minutes in the episode "Skank Hunt" of the animated series South Park which first aired on Comedy Central in the United States on 21 September 2016.

In November 2016, the live album "A-unvan gant ar stered - In unison with the stars" released, recorded during the tour 2015–2016. On 19 November, after 20 years of absence on fest noz stages, the singer animated the Yaouank Festival in Rennes.

== Lyrical influences ==
=== Brittany and nature ===
To Denez Prigent, preserving nature in Brittany is as important as preserving traditions. In An hentoù adkavet, he pays tribute to those who walk around Brittany, singing. At the same time, he regrets the fact that roads, nowadays, are mostly used by cars, leaving little space to walk. Similarly, in Ar gwez-sapin, a song about land consolidation, he criticises the replacement of deciduous trees, traditionally seen in Brittany, with conifers, because of which landscapes lose their specificity, and draws the same link again: "He who is made to forget his culture forgets one day his nature".

The sadness that Denez Prigent feels when he lives in a city is the topic of E trouz ar gêr, which concludes as the world ends, and in Melezourioù-glav, in which he finds a new hope in the last remaining natural element: rain. Since he cannot find nature around him, Prigent keeps it in his memory (Kereñvor). He ends up going back to living in the country, as told in Sarac'h.

Hent-eon is also about harmony with nature, this time in death. The narrator wishes to be buried in a foam path to be eternally cradled by the tide, watched over by his real family: rain, birds, wind, the sea.

A variation on this conviction is found in Geotenn ar marv, a song against the use of genetically modified organisms in agriculture. To him, there is no meaning in singing in Breton on a land that has lost its nature due to this "herb of death" sown by "those who shamelessly changed that which could not be changed".

=== Injustice, disease, death ===
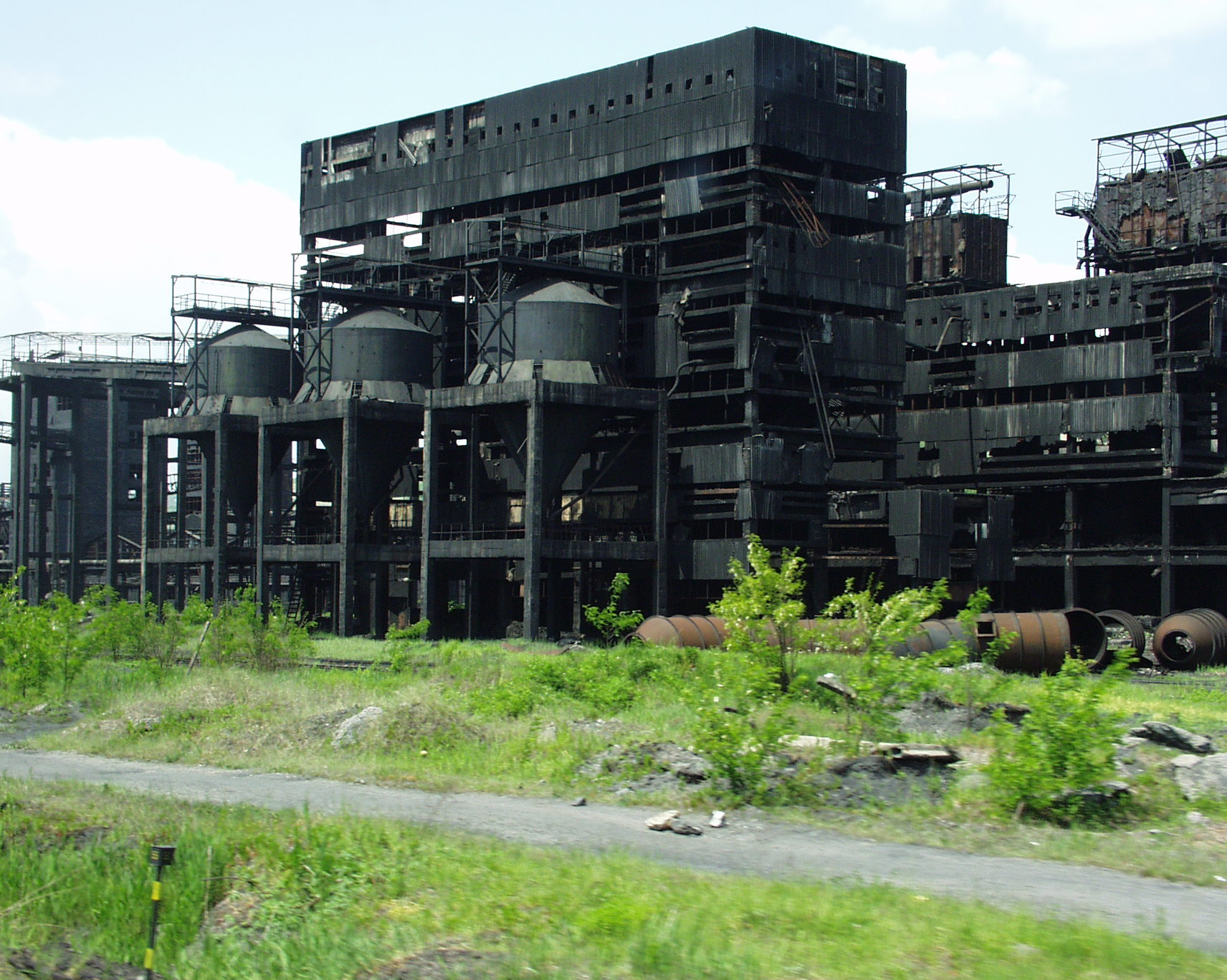
A factory in Copşa Mică.

In the tradition of gwerz, Denez Prigent writes about dramatic events about which he hears during a travel, a conversation, or through medias. The subject of An droug-red is the Ebola epidemic in Zaire. The main character, seeing everyone dying around him, kills an old woman, allegory of the disease. Copsa Mica is about the Sometra factory, representing the metallurgic industry in Copşa Mică, Romania. Producing large amounts of pollutants, this factory was one of the few employers of the city. As a result, young people had, for a living, to operate the blast furnace that killed them slowly. Gwerz Kiev relates the Holodomor, the famine that struck Ukraine in the 1930s, with casualties estimated to four million.

Ur fulenn aour is the lament of a young girl sold by her parents to become a prostitute in the Philippines. A variation on this topic is forced marriage, of which the narrator of A-dreñv va zi is a victim. Given before her thirteenth birthday to a man who makes her a slave, she sheds her tears on the tree she planted, which bears the best fruit in the world. She hanged her husband, her mother-in-law and her parents on that tree.

Denez Prigent also covers some better-known topics in international politics. An iliz ruz is a very graphical description of the massacre of 2,000 people in a church in Nyarubuyé, Rwanda: "they cut their heads off mercilessly / like one reaps wheat in summer". Ar chas ruz relates the invasion of Tibet by China, where the "red dogs" kill not only men, but also their culture.

Two songs are devoted to infanticide. Ar wezenn-dar is more specifically about the case of India, where the policy of population decrease favoured the murder, particularly, of girls. In Ar vamm lazherez, a woman kills her first twelve daughters before being killed by the thirteenth, who survives by supernatural means to carry out the revenge.

== Discography ==
- (1992) Ha daouarn (cassette)
- (1993) Ar gouriz koar (new version released in 1996)
- (1997) Me 'zalc'h ennon ur fulenn aour
- (2000) Irvi
- (2002) Live holl a-gevret!
- (2002) Black Hawk Down – Original Motion Picture Soundtrack (Gortoz a ran)
- (2003) Sarac'h
- (2011) Denez Best of luck chap
- (2015) An enchanting garden: Ul liorzh vurzudhus
- (2016) In unison with the stars: A-unvan gant ar stered
- (2018) Mille chemins
- (2021) Sterenez feat. Vellúa
- (2022) Ur mor a zaeloù: une mer de larmes
- (2025) Toenn-vor: Chants des sept mers

== See also ==
- Breton music
- Kan ha diskan
- Gwerz
