= The Falling Season =

Studio album by Masta Ace
- Released: May 13, 2016
- Studio: Shelter Island (Shelter Island, New York); BGB Lab (Detroit, Michigan)
- Genre: Hip hop
- Length: 1:15:00
- Label: M3 Macmil Music; HHV.DE
- Producer: Filthy Rich (exec.); Masta Ace (exec.); KIC Beats

Masta Ace chronology
| The Tonite Show (2015) | The Falling Season (2016) | A Breukelen Story (2018) |

Professional ratings
Review scores
| Source | Rating |
|---|---|
| HipHopDX | 3.4/5 |
| Juice | 3.5/6 |
| RapReviews | 8.5/10 |

The Falling Season is the seventh solo and tenth overall studio album by American rapper Masta Ace. It was released on May 13, 2016, through M3 Macmil Music/HHV.de. Recording sessions took place at Shelter Island Sound in New York and at BGB Lab in Detroit. Production was handled by KIC Beats, with Richard "Filthy Rich" Ahee and Masta Ace serving as executive producers. It features guest appearances from Pav Bundy, A.G., Beej, Chuck D, Cormega, Deion, Denez Prigent, Hypnotic Brass Ensemble, LT, Nikky Bourbon, Pearl Gates, Queen Heroine, Stricklin, The World's Famous Supreme Team, Torae, Wordsworth and Your Old Droog among others.

As with Masta Ace's previous albums, The Falling Season is a concept album and tells a story of Masta Ace's high school years. It was released on CD, vinyl and cassette tape.

== Track listing ==
| No. | Title | Writer(s) | Length |
|---|---|---|---|
| 1. | "Summer's End (Skit)" (performed by Damion Neal) | | 0:48 |
| 2. | "3000 Avenue X" (featuring Your Old Droog) | Duval Clear; Your Old Droog; Spencer Hinkle; Ryan Anthony Lucero | 3:20 |
| 3. | "Welcome to the Bay (Skit)" (performed by Damion Neal and Fatz Belvedere) | | 1:38 |
| 4. | "Young Black Intelligent" (featuring Pav Bundy, Hypnotic Brass Ensemble and Chuck D) | Clear; Paris Wells; Hypnotic Brass Ensemble; Carlton Ridenhour; Lucero | 4:17 |
| 5. | "Me & A.G." (featuring A.G.) | Clear; Andre Barnes; Lucero | 3:39 |
| 6. | "Team Tryouts (Skit)" (performed by Damion Neal and Michael Walker Jr.) | | 1:01 |
| 7. | "Labyrinth (Frankie Beverly)" (featuring LT) | Clear; Lynne Timmes; Lucero | 4:04 |
| 8. | "Mr Bus Driver" (featuring Nikky Bourbon) | Clear; Lucero; Carlos Perez | 4:34 |
| 9. | "Mothers Regret" (featuring Heroine) | Clear; Peridot Smith; Lucero | 4:26 |
| 10. | "Math Class (Skit)" (performed by Damion Neal and Fatz Belvedere) | | 0:19 |
| 11. | "Mathematics" | Clear; Lucero | 2:28 |
| 12. | "Coach's Speech (Skit)" (performed by Damion Neal and Richard Reilly) | | 1:01 |
| 13. | "Say Goodbye" (featuring Pav Bundy and Wordsworth) | Clear; Wells; Vinson Johnson; Lucero | 5:10 |
| 14. | "Bang Bang" (featuring Beej and Cormega) | Clear; Beej Brooks; Cory McKay; Lucero | 4:08 |
| 15. | "Hall Pass (Skit)" (performed by Damion Neal, Fatz Belvedere, Lauren Sorrentino and Lindsey Sorrentino) | | 0:43 |
| 16. | "Juanita Estefan" (featuring Strick) | Clear; Stephen Stricklin; Shay Mehrdad; Lucero | 4:17 |
| 17. | "Battle Talk (Skit)" (performed by Damion Neal, Michael Walker Jr. and Isiah McFadden) | | 0:24 |
| 18. | "High School Shit" (featuring Torae) | Clear; Torae Carr; Lucero | 3:29 |
| 19. | "Nana" (featuring Deion) | Clear; Dion Jenkins; Lucero | 4:31 |
| 20. | "Total Recall" (featuring The World's Famous Supreme Team) | Clear; Larry Price; Ronald Larkins; Lucero | 3:53 |
| 21. | "Outroduction (Skit)" (performed by Damion Neal) | | 0:50 |
| 22. | "Coronation" | Clear; Lucero | 4:24 |
| 23. | "Story of Me" (featuring Denez Prigent and Pearl Gates) | Clear; Cesar Perez; Alex Kasvikis; Lucero; Sean Taylor | 7:46 |
| 24. | "Outtakes" | | 3:50 |
| Total length: | | | 1:15:00 |

== Personnel ==
- Duval "Masta Ace" Clear – performer (tracks: 2, 4, 5, 7–9, 11, 13, 14, 16, 18–20, 22, 23), mixing, executive producer
- Damion Neal – performer (tracks: 1, 3, 6, 10, 12, 15, 17, 21)
- Your Old Droog – performer (track 2)
- Fatz Belvedere – performer (tracks: 3, 10, 15)
- Paris "Pav Bundy" Wells – performer (tracks: 4, 13)
- Carlton "Chuck D" Ridenhour – performer (track 4)
- Hypnotic Brass Ensemble – performers (track 4)
- Andre "A.G." Barnes – performer (track 5)
- Michael Walker Jr. – performer (tracks: 6, 17)
- Lynne "LT" Timmes – performer (track 7)
- Nikky Bourbon – performer (track 8), overtone voice (track 22)
- Peridot "Queen Herowin" Smith – performer (track 9), overtone voice (track 2)
- Richard Reilly – performer (track 12)
- Vinson "Wordsworth" Johnson – performer (track 13)
- Beej Brooks – performer (track 14)
- Cory "Cormega" McKay – performer (track 14)
- Lauren Sorrentino – performer (track 15)
- Lindsey Sorrentino – performer (track 15)
- Stephen "Strick" Stricklin – performer (track 16)
- Isiah McFadden – performer (track 17)
- Torae Carr – performer (track 18)
- Dion Jenkins – performer (track 19)
- Larry "Sedivine the Mastermind" Price – performer (track 20)
- Ronald "JazzyJust" Larkins Jr. – performer (track 20)
- Denez Prigent – performer (track 23)
- Cesar "Pearl Gates" Perez Jr. – performer (track 23)
- Spencer Hinkle – electric upright bass (track 2)
- Brenda K. Starr – additional vocals (track 4)
- Marlon Saunders – additional vocals (track 4)
- Leschea A. Boatwright – additional vocals (tracks: 7, 13)
- William "DJ JS-1" Tramontozzi – scratches (tracks: 7, 8)
- Shawn Taylor – trumpet (tracks: 9, 23)
- Shay Mehrdad – guitar (track 16)
- Kinte "Apocalypse" Givens – additional vocals (track 18)
- Ryan "KIC Beats" Lucero – piano (track 23), producer
- Alex Kasvikis – bass guitar (track 23)
- Marissa Licata – violin (track 23)
- Richard "Filthy Rich" Ahee – mixing, executive producer
- Rick Essig – mastering
- Robert "DJ Rob" Alphonse – art direction
- Temper – artwork
- Zoe Michaela Riess – photography
- Florian Roeske – additional photography
