= Masta Ace Incorporated =

American hip hop group

- The Source, June 1993; Left to right: Eye, Lord Digga, Masta Ace, Ken and Uneek

Background information
- Also known as: The INC
- Origin: Brooklyn, New York City, U.S.
- Genres: Hip hop
- Years active: 1992–1996
- Label: Delicious Vinyl
- Members: Masta Ace; Lord Digga; Paula Perry; Leschea; Eyceurokk (Eyce, Uneek, Rokkdiesel)

Masta Ace Incorporated was an American hip hop crew formed by rapper Masta Ace, active from 1992 to 1996.

== History ==
The group, also known as The I.N.C., included Eyceurokk (Eyce, Uneek and Rokkdiesel), Lord Digga, Paula Perry and R&B vocalist Leschea. Ace first gained notice in the rap world as a member of the legendary Juice Crew, and with the release of his acclaimed 1990 debut Take a Look Around, which featured an appearance from Eyceurokk. In 1992, Ace formed the I.N.C. crew and recorded their first group album, SlaughtaHouse, which was released in May 1993. Ace provided almost all of the rapping, with Lord Digga serving as the hype-man. Digga was also responsible for a bulk of the beats, producing five of the album's songs as part of the duo Bluez Brothers. Paula Perry was the main performer on the song "Who U Jackin'?", Leschea provided vocals for "Don't Fuck Around (Outro)", and Eyceurokk appeared on the tracks '"Slaughtahouse"' (as MC Negro & Ignant MC), "Ain't U Da Masta" and "Saturday Nite Live". The album was highly acclaimed, but sold only moderately well. Some versions of SlaughtaHouse included the hidden bonus track, "Born to Roll", which became a huge hit in 1994, breaking into the Top 25 on the Billboard Hot 100 singles chart. Eyceurokk split from the crew after SlaughtaHouse, leaving the group to four members.

In 1995, the crew released their second album, Sittin' on Chrome, which featured "Born to Roll", as well as two more Hot 100 hit singles, "The I.N.C. Ride" and "Sittin' on Chrome". The album, produced by Ace, Bluez Bruthas (Lord Digga and Witch Doctor), Uneek and Louie Vega, featured a sound Ace called "Brooklyn Bass Music". The album was also highly acclaimed, and sold better than SlaughtaHouse, but still wasn't able to push a strong amount of units. The crew split up in 1996, after Ace began having personal conflicts with Lord Digga and Paula Perry. Ace was largely missing from the scene until 2001, when he returned with his acclaimed solo album Disposable Arts. According to a 2006 interview on Prince Paul's XM Radio show, Ace stated that he and Lord Digga are finally speaking again, but Ace has yet to collaborate with either Digga or Paula Perry since the crew's break-up. However, he did work with Leschea on "Type I Hate" from his 2001 album, Disposable Arts and "Bklyn Masala" from his 2004 album, A Long Hot Summer.

== Discography ==
Album information
SlaughtaHouse
- Released: May 4, 1993
- Billboard 200 chart position: #134
- R&B/Hip-Hop chart position: #32
- Singles: "Jeep Ass Niguh"/"SlaughtaHouse", "Saturday Nite Live"/"Style Wars", "Born to Roll"
Sittin' on Chrome
- Released: May 2, 1995
- Billboard 200 chart position: #69
- R&B/Hip-Hop chart position: #19
- Singles: "Born to Roll", "The I.N.C. Ride"/"The Phat Kat Ride", "Sittin' on Chrome", "Turn it Up"

== See also ==
- Masta Ace
