= Born to Roll (song) =

Single by Masta Ace Incorporated

from the album Sittin' on Chrome and SlaughtaHouse (1995 re-release)
- B-side: "The B-Side"
- Released: January 1994
- Recorded: 1992
- Genre: Hip hop
- Length: 4:07
- Label: Delicious Vinyl
- Songwriter(s): Duval Clear, Eric McIntosh, A.A. Brown
- Producer(s): Ase One

Masta Ace Incorporated singles chronology
"Jeep Ass Niguh" (1993)	"Born to Roll" (1994)	"The I.N.C. Ride" (1995)

"Born to Roll" is a single by Masta Ace Incorporated. Released initially as a standalone single in 1994, "Born To Roll" is the West Coast remake of "Jeep Ass Niguh" (the hit single from their 1993 debut album SlaughtaHouse) with the same lyrics, now musically modified to pay homage to the West Coast sound (which was popular by this time) and the lowrider scene, keeping with the theme of cars and loud, booming music. Group leader Masta Ace was the sole performer of the song, as well as the sole producer of this version under the credit of Ase One.

"Born To Roll" became Masta Ace's biggest chart hit, peaking at number 23 on the Billboard Hot 100 and also at #5 on the Hot Rap Singles chart, garnering relatively greater popularity than its original East Coast counterpart. The success of the song led to its inclusion on the group's second album, Sittin' on Chrome in 1995 and eventually as a bonus track on the subsequent re-release of the SlaughtaHouse album that same year.

== Single track listing ==
=== A-Side ===
1. "Born to Roll" (Album Version) – 4:14
2. "Born to Roll" (Instrumental) – 4:14

=== B-Side ===
1. "The B-Side" – 4:08
2. "Born to Roll" (Sextrumental) – 2:26

== Chart history ==
=== Weekly charts ===
Chart (1994)	Peak position
Billboard Hot 100	23
Billboard Hot R&B Singles	33
Billboard Hot Rap Singles	5
Billboard Hot Dance Music/Maxi-Singles Sales	11
Billboard Rhythmic Top 40	13
Radio & Records Contemporary Hit Top 40	40

=== Year-end charts ===
Chart (1994)	Position
Billboard Hot Rap Singles	21
