= Punch n' Words =

Punch N' Words

EP by Punchline and Wordsworth
- Released: November 7, 2000
- Studio: The Cutting Room (New York, NY); D&D Studios (New York, NY)
- Genre: Hip hop
- Length: 24:53
- Label: Mona Hip Hop
- Producer: Curt Gowdy

Punch N' Words is the only collaborative extended play by American rappers Punchline and Wordsworth. It was released on November 7, 2000 via Mona Hip Hop. Recording sessions took place at The Cutting Room and D&D Studios in New York City. Production was handled entirely by Curt Gowdy, who also served as one of the executive producers together with Jay-EF, Joey T., Punchline and Wordsworth. It features a guest appearance from Allure. The album was supported with two promotional singles: "Last Days (So What)" b/w "Mistress" and "Let Me Be" b/w "I-95".

== Track listing ==
| No. | Title | Length |
|---|---|---|
| 1. | "Intro" | 0:25 |
| 2. | "Punch N Words" | 3:38 |
| 3. | "Last Days (So What)" | 4:35 |
| 4. | "Mistress" | 4:18 |
| 5. | "I-95" (featuring Allure) | 4:15 |
| 6. | "Watching Me" | 3:57 |
| 7. | "War" | 3:45 |
| Total length: | | 24:53 |

== Personnel ==
- Rashaan "Punchline" Truell – vocals, executive producer, sleeve notes
- Vinson "Wordsworth" Johnson – vocals, executive producer, sleeve notes
- Allure – vocals (track 5)
- Richard "Curt Gowdy" Pimentel – producer, executive producer
- Dejuana Richardson – recording, mixing
- Joseph "Joey T." Tolipani – executive producer
- John "Jay-EF" Fresh – executive producer
