= Disposable Arts =

Studio album by Masta Ace
- Released: October 16, 2001
- Recorded: 2000–2001
- Studio: 78/88 Recording Studios
- Genre: Hip hop
- Length: 72:34
- Label: JCOR Entertainment
- Producers: Ayatollah; Deacon the Villain; DJ 3D; DJ A. Vee; DJ Rob; Domingo; Gerrard C. Baker; Koolade; Luis Tineo; Masta Ace; Paul Nice; Rodney Hunter; Xplicit

Masta Ace chronology
Sittin' on Chrome (1995)	Disposable Arts (2001)	A Long Hot Summer (2004)

Professional ratings
Review scores
Source	Rating
AllMusic	4/5 stars
HipHopDX	4.5/5
RapReviews	8/10

Disposable Arts is the second solo and fourth overall studio album by American rapper Masta Ace. It was released on October 16, 2001, via JCOR Entertainment. Production was handled by Domingo, Luis Tineo, Xplicit, Ayatollah, Deacon the Villain, DJ 3D, DJ A. Vee, DJ Rob, Gerrard C. Baker, Koolade, Paul Nice, Rodney Hunter and Ace himself. It features guest appearances from eMC, MC Paul Barman, Jane Doe, Mr. Lee G, Apocalypse, Greg Nice, Jean Grae, J-Ro, King Tee, Leschea, Rah Digga, Young Zee and Tonedeff.

The concept of the album follows a young Brooklyn man's release from prison, his return home, and his life at "The Institute of Disposable Arts", a school in which Ace enrolls after realizing how bad the situation in Brooklyn is.

The album sold poorly compared to his previous albums, due to JCOR Entertainment folding a month after its release but it was generally well received by critics and fans alike. The cover art is an ironic nod to his "Sittin' on Chrome" days, showing Masta Ace sitting on a car seat in the street without a car. Included on the album is the song "Acknowledge", a notable diss track to rapper Boogeyman and group The High & Mighty. The song "Unfriendly Game" was used in the TV series The Wire and is included on one of its soundtracks. The song "Take A Walk" was used in the video game Saints Row, and was found on one of the various in game radio stations.

In 2013, D. Aurelius directed a documentary video of making the album, starring Ace, Rah Digga and Justin Hunte.

== Track listing ==
No.	Title	Writer(s)	Producer(s)	Length
1.	"The Release" (featuring Tony Hanna)			0:48
2.	"Too Long" (featuring Apocalypse)	Duval Clear; Kinte Givens	Masta Ace	2:34
3.	"Block Episode" (featuring Punchline and Wordsworth)	Clear; Rashaan Truell; Vinson Johnson; Luis Tineo	Luis "Sabor" Tineo	3:48
4.	"IDA Commercial" (featuring Tonedeff)			1:18
5.	"Don't Understand" (featuring Greg Nice)	Clear; Greg Mays; Paul Kilianski	Paul Nice	3:56
6.	"Goodbye Lisa" (featuring Jane Doe)			1:00
7.	"Hold U" (featuring Jean Grae)	Clear; Tsidi Ibrahim; Lamont Dorrell	Ayatollah	4:16
8.	"Every Other Day" (featuring Mr. Lee G and Sas)	Clear; Leroy H. Griffith, Jr.; Thomas Raic	Xplicit	4:29
9.	"Roommates Meet" (featuring MC Paul Barman)			1:14
10.	"Take a Walk" (featuring Apocalypse and Punchline)	Clear; Givens; Gerrard C. Baker	Gerrard C. Baker	5:07
11.	"Something's Wrong" (featuring Strick and Young Zee)	Clear; Stephen Stricklin; Dewayne Battle; Matko Šašek	Koolade	4:10
12.	"The Classes" (featuring MC Paul Barman)			0:59
13.	"Acknowledge"	Clear; Raic	Xplicit	4:13
14.	"Enuff" (featuring Mr. Lee G)	Clear; Griffith, Jr.; Rodney Hunter	Rodney Hunter	4:48
15.	"Watching the Game" (featuring Strick)			0:57
16.	"Unfriendly Game" (featuring Strick, Jugga the Bully, Sherri Abercrombie and Suede)	Clear; Stricklin; Tineo	Luis "Sabor" Tineo	4:16
17.	"Alphabet Soup" (featuring Blaise Dupuy)	Clear; Domingo Padilla	Domingo	2:44
18.	"Dear Yvette" (featuring Jane Doe and Jessica Harrell)	Clear; Latania Morris-Rossell; Jessica Harrell; Robert Alphonse	DJ Rob	3:29
19.	"I Like Dat" (featuring Punchline, Wordsworth, Claudia Arindale, Ebony and Shireen Rahman)	Clear; Truell; Johnson; William Bagley; Alix Val	DJ 3D; DJ A. Vee	3:32
20.	"P.T.A." (featuring J-Ro, King Tee, Drugga and Uneek)	Clear; James Robinson; Roger McBrige; Willis Polk II	Deacon the Villain	3:59
21.	"Type I Hate" (featuring Rah Digga and Leschea)	Clear; Rashia Fisher; Schea Boatwright; Padilla	Domingo	4:12
22.	"Dear Diary"	Clear; Padilla	Domingo	3:01
23.	"Last Rights" (featuring MC Paul Barman)			1:05
24.	"No Regrets"	Clear; Padilla	Domingo	3:05
Total length:				1:13:00

== Personnel ==
- Duval "Masta Ace" Clear – performer, producer (track: 2), mixing
- Tony Hanna – vocals (track 1)
- Kinte "Apocalypse" Givens – vocals (tracks: 2, 10)
- Rashaan "Punchline" Truell – vocals (tracks: 3, 19), backing vocals (track 10)
- Vinson "Wordsworth" Johnson – vocals (tracks: 3, 19)
- Tony "Tonedeff" Rojas – vocals (track 4)
- Gregory "Greg Nice" Mays – vocals (track 5)
- Latania "Jane Doe" Morris-Rossell – vocals (tracks: 6, 18)
- Tsidi "Jean Grae" Ibrahim – vocals (track 7)
- Leroy H. "Mr. Lee G" Griffith Jr. – backing vocals (track 8), vocals (track 14)
- Sas – backing vocals (track 8)
- MC Paul Barman – vocals (tracks: 9, 12, 23)
- Stephen "Strick" Stricklin – vocals (tracks: 11, 15, 16)
- Dewayne "Young Zee" Battle – vocals (track 11)
- Francis R. "Jugga the Bully" Roberts Jr. – vocals (track 16)
- Sherri Ambercrombie – backing vocals (track 16)
- Suede – backing vocals (track 16)
- Blaise Dupuy – vocals (track 17)
- Jessica Harrell – backing vocals (track 18)
- Claudia Arindale – backing vocals (track 19)
- Ebony – backing vocals (track 19)
- Shireen Rahman – backing vocals (track 19)
- James "J-Ro" Robinson – vocals (track 20)
- Roger "King Tee" McBride – vocals (track 20)
- Drugga – vocals (track 20)
- Sean "Uneek" McFadden – vocals (track 20)
- Rashia "Rah Digga" Fisher – vocals (track 21)
- Leschea A. Boatwright – vocals (track 21)
- William "DJ JS-1" Tramontozzi – scratches (tracks: 5, 13)
- Luis R. Tineo – producer (tracks: 3, 16)
- Paul "Paul Nice" Kilianski – producer (track 5)
- Lamont "Ayatollah" Dorrell – producer (track 7)
- Thomas "Xplicit" Raic – producer (tracks: 8, 13)
- Gerrard C. Baker – producer (track 10)
- Matko "Koolade" Šašek – producer (track 11)
- Rodney Hunter – producer (track 14)
- Domingo Padilla – producer (tracks: 17, 21, 22, 24), recording (track 22), mixing
- Robert "DJ Rob" Alphonse – producer (track 18), recording (tracks: 1–4, 6–12, 14–19, 21, 23, 24)
- William "DJ 3D" Bagley – producer (track 19)
- Alix "DJ A. Vee" Val – producer (track 19)
- Willis "Deacon the Villain" Polk II – producer (track 20)
- Robert "Lord Finesse" Hall Jr. – recording (tracks: 5, 13)
- Richard "Filthy Rich" Ahee – recording (track 5), mixing

=== Cast ===
- Correction Officer: Tony Hanna
- IDA Commercial: Tonedeff
- Lisa: Jane Doe
- Paul the Roommate: MC Paul Barman
- Caller from home: Strick
- Tyreek: Jugga
- Newscaster: Blaise Dupuy
- Bitch Nigga callers: Uneek & Drugga
- Interviewer: Chyrisse Turner

== Album singles ==
Album information
Don't Understand
- Released: 2001
- B-side: "Acknowledge"

== Charts ==
Chart (2001)	Peak position
US Top R&B/Hip-Hop Albums (Billboard)	90
