= A Breukelen Story =

Studio album by Masta Ace and Marco Polo
- Released: November 9, 2018
- Studio: The Crib
- Genre: Hip hop
- Length: 54:54
- Label: Fat Beats
- Producers: Masta Ace (exec.); Marco Polo (also exec.)

Masta Ace chronology
The Falling Season (2016)	A Breukelen Story (2018)	Richmond Hill (2024)

Marco Polo chronology
A-F-R-O Polo (2016)	A Breukelen Story (2018)	Richmond Hill (2024)

A Breukelen Story is a collaborative studio album by American rapper Masta Ace and Canadian hip hop record producer Marco Polo. It was released on November 9, 2018 via Fat Beats Records. Production was handled solely by Marco Polo, who also served as executive producer together with Masta Ace. It features guest appearances from Elzhi, eMC, Lil' Fame, Marlon Craft, Pav Bundy, Pearl Gates, Pharoahe Monch, Smif-N-Wessun, Styles P and Trini Boy. An eight-track bonus extended play was released in 2019 featuring production from DJ Premier, remixing from the Drum Majors, and guest appearance from Evidence.

== Critical reception ==
Professional ratings
Review scores
Source	Rating
Albumism	4.5/5 stars
RapReviews	8.5/10
The 405	7/10
Tom Hull	B+

Albumism's Daryl McIntosh praised the album, saying "with A Breukelen Story, Ace and Polo craft the musical equivalent of a screenplay or novel, by sharing their personal stories and memories reflective of life in one of America's great microcosms". Sy Shackleford of RapReviews found both artists "have employed their respective talents to provide their perspective on their home and what it has birthed". Tom Hull resumed: "rapper Duval Clear, past 50 now, which moves him from gangsta to old school, teamed up with beats producer Marco Bruno, tells the story of someone moving from Toronto to New York to break into hip-hop (roughly speaking, much Bruno's story), although the music easily tops the story".

=== Accolades ===
Publication	List	Rank	Ref.
Albumism	The 50 Best Albums of 2018	41	

== Track listing ==
No.	Title	Length
1.	"Kings"	3:08
2.	"Dad's Talk" (Skit)	0:46
3.	"Breukelen "Brooklyn"" (featuring Smif-N-Wessun)	4:05
4.	"Get Shot"	3:36
5.	"Still Love Her" (featuring Pearl Gates)	4:35
6.	"Man Law" (featuring Styles P)	4:22
7.	"You & I"	3:10
8.	"Gotta Go" (Skit)	0:38
9.	"Sunken Place" (featuring Pav Bundy)	3:56
10.	"Corporal Punishment" (featuring eLZhi)	3:23
11.	"Landlord of the Flies" (Skit)	0:41
12.	"Count Em Up" (featuring Lil' Fame)	3:49
13.	"American Me"	3:14
14.	"The Cutting Room" (Skit)	0:45
15.	"God Bodies" (featuring Trini Boy)	3:06
16.	"Wanna Be" (featuring Marlon Craft)	4:17
17.	"Three" (featuring eMC)	2:47
18.	"Fight Song" (featuring Pharoahe Monch)	3:47
19.	"Mom's Talk" (Skit)	0:49
Total length:		54:54

A Breukelen Story - Bonus EP
No.	Title	Producer(s)	Length
20.	"Eat" (featuring Evidence)	DJ Premier
21.	"Masta Polo"
22.	"Sunken Place" (Remix)
23.	"Y.B.I." (The Drum Majors Remix)
24.	"E.A.T." (Instrumental)
25.	"Masta Polo" (Instrumental)
26.	"Sunken Place Remix" (Instrumental)
27.	"Y.B.I. (The Drum Majors Remix)" (Instrumental)

== Personnel ==
- Duval "Masta Ace" Clear – vocals, executive producer
- Marco "Marco Polo" Bruno – producer, recording, mixing, executive producer
- Jay "Shylow" Khan – recording, editing
- Richard "Filthy Rich" Ahee – recording
- Ricardo Gutierrez – mixing, mastering
- Emanuele "Mocce" Mocchetti – mixing
- André "Deck97" Henriques – art direction, design
- Mr. Wattson – photography
- Darrell A. "Steele" Yates Jr. – guest artist (track 3)
- Tekomin B. "Tek" Williams – guest artist (track 3)
- Cesar "Pearl Gates" Perez Jr. – guest artist (track 5)
- David "Styles P" Styles – guest artist (track 6)
- Paris "Pav Bundy" Wells – guest artist (track 9)
- Jason "eLZhi" Powers – guest artist (track 10)
- Jamal Gerard "Lil' Fame" Grinnage – guest artist (track 12)
- Trini Boy – guest artist (track 15)
- Marlon Craft – guest artist (track 16)
- Stephen "Strick" Stricklin – guest artist (track 17)
- Vinson "Wordsworth" Johnson – guest artist (track 17)
- Troy Donald "Pharoahe Monch" Jamerson – guest artist (track 18)
