= M3 Records =

- Founded: 2003
- Founder: Duval Clear
- Distributor(s): Traffic Entertainment Group
- Genre: Hip Hop
- Country of origin: United States
- Official website: http://www.M3HipHop.com

M3 Records (formerly known as M3 Macmil Music) is an American independent hip hop record label in New York City, headed by rapper Masta Ace. The label was founded in 2003, nearly two years after Ace's former label, JCOR Records, folded. The first nationally distributed release on the label was Ace's fifth studio album A Long Hot Summer. The label is now home to Ace's supergroup eMC, which also features underground duo Punch & Words and Milwaukee rapper Strick.

== Roster ==
- Masta Ace
- Wordsworth (not signed to M3 Hip Hop)
- Strick
- eMC
- Bundies

Former: Punchline (Rapper) DeLaZoo (Rapper and Singer)

== Discography ==
- 2004: Masta Ace - A Long Hot Summer
- 2008: eMC - The Show
- 2009: Masta Ace & Edo G - Arts & Entertainment
- 2010: Masta Ace & Edo G - Extra Entertainment
- 2012: Masta Ace - MA DOOM: Son of Yvonne
- 2015: eMC - The Tonite Show
- 2016: Masta Ace - The Falling Season

== See also ==
- List of record labels
