= A Long Hot Summer =

Studio album by Masta Ace
- Released: August 3, 2004
- Recorded: 2003–04
- Genre: Hip hop
- Length: 1:03:29
- Label: M3 Macmil Music
- Producers: Filthy Rich (exec.); DJ Rob (also exec.); Masta Ace (also exec.); 9th Wonder; Dams & Sla; DJ Serious; DJ Spinna; DR Period; Dug Infinite; Marco Polo; Khrysis; Koolade; Xplicit; Brian Anderson; Brutal Artistry Productions

Masta Ace chronology
Disposable Arts (2001)	A Long Hot Summer (2004)	The Show (2008)

Singles from A Long Hot Summer
- 1. "Good Ol' Love / The Ways" Released: July 1, 2004; 2. "Beautiful / Follow" Released: July 29, 2004; 3. "Da Grind / Do It Man" Released: December 27, 2004

Professional ratings
Aggregate scores
Source	Rating
Metacritic	78/100
Review scores
Source	Rating
AllMusic	3.5/5 stars
The Austin Chronicle	3.5/5 stars
Cokemachineglow	78%/100%
HipHopDX	4.5/5
laut.de	5/5 stars
Pitchfork	7.1/10
RapReviews	8.5/10
Robert Christgau	(2-star Honorable Mention)
Vibe	4/5 marks
XXL	4/5 (XL)

A Long Hot Summer is the third solo and fifth overall studio album by American rapper Masta Ace. It was released on August 3, 2004 via M3 Macmil Music. Production was handled by Dams & Sla, Dug Infinite, Xplicit, 9th Wonder, DJ Serious, DJ Spinna, DR Period, Marco Polo, Khrysis, Koolade, and Ace himself. It features guest appearances from eMC, Leschea, Apocalypse, Big Noyd, Ed O.G., Jean Grae, Mr. Lee G, The Beatnuts and Rahzel.

The concept story follows Ace, an underground rapper through his "Long Hot Summer" in Brooklyn, accompanied by buddy Fats Belvedere. Ace ventures through the Brooklyn streets and goes out on tour with Fats as his unofficial manager.

== Critical reception ==
A Long Hot Summer was met with generally favorable reviews from music critics. At Metacritic, which assigns a normalized rating out of 100 to reviews from mainstream publications, the album received an average score of 78, based on ten reviews.

Matt Jost of RapReviews.com wrote: "shorter than its predecessor, it is also a more cohesive and even effort, making Ace and Brooklyn the focal points of this hour plus narrative told in the now trademark laid-back manner". Noah Callahan-Bever of Vibe stated: "though his singles may not rule radio, as far as full-lengths go, this is how it should be done". Chet Betz of Cokemachineglow found "Masta Ace's maturity informs his simplicity; experience strengthens the straightforward so that his words come methodically and sincerely". Jamin Warren of Pitchfork recommended: "unfortunately, A Long Hot Summer starts slowly. In fact, when you cop this album, do yourself a favor and skip the first five tracks". Robert Gabriel of The Austin Chronicle resumed: "wise beyond his decades, Masta Ace stands at the altar with lyrical depth as his bride". Urb reviewer wrote: "the record falters only when Ace recounts a gangster parable about shady dealings with a certain Fats Belvedere".

Stylus Magazine gave the album a mixed review: "his new album isn't quite as good as Disposable Arts, but it's similarly engaging--he is both confident and insecure, and this incongruity defines his music". Veteran critic Robert Christgau summed it up with: "old-schooler as working stiff--craftsmanlike rhymer and plotter, much heart", highlighting songs "Da Grind" and "Bklyn Masala".

== Track listing ==
No.	Title	Writer(s)	Producer(s)	Length
1.	"The Count"			2:11
2.	"Big City"	Duval Clear; Doug Thomas	Dug Infinite	3:01
3.	"Good Ol Love" (featuring Mr. Lee G and Leschea)	Clear; Leroy H. Griffith, Jr.; Patrick Douthit	9th Wonder	3:46
4.	"Fats Belvedere"			0:38
5.	"Da Grind" (featuring Apocalypse)	Clear; Kinte Givens; Christopher Tyson	Khrysis	3:27
6.	"H.O.O.D."	Clear; N. Donati	Dams & Sla	3:45
7.	"The Stoop"			0:53
8.	"Beautiful" (featuring Wordsworth)	Clear; Vinson Johnson; Matko Šašek	Koolade	4:24
9.	"F.A.Y." (featuring Strick and Punchline)	Clear; Stephen Stricklin; Darryl Pittman	DR Period	3:34
10.	"Fats Crib"			0:35
11.	"Soda & Soap" (featuring Jean Grae)	Clear; Tsidi Ibrahim; Vincent Williams	DJ Spinna	4:12
12.	"Do It Man" (featuring Big Noyd)	Clear; Terance Perry; Marco Bruno	Marco Polo	2:56
13.	"Bklyn Masala" (featuring Leschea)	Clear; Thomas Raic	Xplicit	4:19
14.	"The Proposition"			1:38
15.	"Travelocity" (featuring Punchline and Wordsworth)	Clear; Rashaan Truell; Johnson; Donati	Dams & Sla	3:51
16.	"The Ways"	Clear; David Yan	DJ Serious	3:28
17.	"Wutuwankno" (featuring Ed O.G.)	Clear; Edward Anderson; Thomas	Dug Infinite	4:11
18.	"The After Party"			1:08
19.	"Oh My God" (featuring The Beatnuts and Rahzel)	Clear; Lester Fernandez; Jerry Tineo; Raic	Xplicit	3:50
20.	"Cellmate"			1:16
21.	"Revelations" (featuring Leschea)	Clear	Masta Ace; DJ Rob (co.)	3:50
22.	Untitled			2:37
Total length:				1:03:29

2015 bonus tracks
No.	Title	Producer(s)	Length
23.	"Globetrotter" (featuring AKD)	Brian Anderson	4:04
24.	"GMO"	Brutal Artistry Productions	2:48

== Personnel ==
- Duval "Masta Ace" Clear – vocals, producer (track 21), mixing, executive producer
- Leroy H. "Mr. Lee G" Griffith, Jr. – backing vocals (track 3)
- Leschea A. Boatwright – vocals (track 13), backing vocals (tracks: 3, 21)
- Kinte "Apocalypse" Givens – vocals (track 5)
- Vinson "Wordsworth" Johnson – vocals (track 15), backing vocals (track 8)
- Stephen "Strick" Stricklin – vocals (track 9)
- Rashaan "Punchline" Truell – vocals (track 15), backing vocals (track 9)
- Tsidi "Jean Grae" Ibrahim – vocals (track 11)
- Tajuan "Big Noyd" Perry – vocals (track 12)
- Edward "Ed O.G." Anderson – vocals (track 17)
- Lester "Psycho Les" Fernandez – vocals (track 19)
- Jerry "JuJu" Tineo – vocals (track 19)
- Rozell Manely Brown – vocals (track 19)
- William "DJ JS-1" Tramontozzi – scratches (tracks: 5, 13, 19)
- DJ Ody-Roc – scratches (track 16)
- Jay "J-Zone" Mumford – soundbite (track 19)
- Shawn Lucas – keyboards (track 21)
- Anthony Lucas – bass (track 21)
- Doug "Dug Infinite" Thomas – producer (tracks: 2, 17)
- Patrick "9th Wonder" Douthit – producer (track 3)
- Christopher "Khrysis" Tyson – producer (track 5)
- Dams & Sla – producers (tracks: 6, 15)
- Matko "Koolade" Šašek – producer (track 8)
- Darryl "DR Period" Pittman – producer (track 9)
- Vincent "DJ Spinna" Williams – producer (track 11)
- Marco "Marco Polo" Bruno – producer (track 12)
- Thomas "Xplicit" Raic – producer (tracks: 13, 19)
- David "DJ Serious" Yan – producer (track 16)
- Robert "DJ Rob" Alphonse – co-producer (track 21), recording, mixing, executive producer
- Richard "Filthy Rich" Ahee – recording, mixing, executive producer
- Stephen Dent – recording

Cast

- Duval Clear as Masta Ace
- Fatz Belvedere as himself
- Frankie Aikens as E
- Franklyn Grant, Jr. as Hotel Maintenance Guy
- Steve Dent as Promoter
- Michael Rapaport as Cell Mate

== Charts ==
Chart (2004)	Peak position
US Independent Albums (Billboard)	44
US Top R&B/Hip-Hop Albums (Billboard)	82
