= Leschea =

- Birth name: Schea Boatwright
- Born: January 27, 1971 (age 54); Brooklyn, New York City, U.S.
- Genres: Hip hop; R&B
- Occupations: Rapper; singer; songwriter; host
- Instrument: Vocals
- Years active: 1995–present
- Labels: Warner Bros.
- Formerly of: Masta Ace Incorporated

Schea Boatwright (born January 27, 1971), better known by the stage name of Leschea (pronounced le-SHAY) is a contemporary R&B performer who had success in 1995 and 1996 with her debut album Rhythm & Beats. On December 6, 2005, her album was re-released through iTunes. Leschea was also part of the group Masta Ace Incorporated.

== Early life and career ==
Leschea was born and raised in the Bedford Stuyvesant section of Brooklyn, New York, and began singing and performing at the age of eight. Despite having no formal training, she honed her vocal and performing skills through school productions from junior high to junior college.

In 1995, Leschea sang background vocals on Masta Ace's album, Sittin' on Chrome, which led to her signing with Warner Bros. Records in 1996. The following year, she achieved chart success with the singles "How We Stay" and "Fulton St." Her buzz grew heavily in the summer of 1997 thanks to a strong street promotions campaign and the success of her two singles. "Fulton St." in particular was a top 10 best-selling single in NYC for seven weeks.

Despite her initial success, Leschea's debut album, Rhythm & Beats, was prematurely released and did not receive much attention. However, her music videos became hits on BET, peaking in the top twenty of the network's weekly most-played list. The first single, "How We Stay," received heavy mix show play in NYC, while the follow-up single, "Fulton St.," peaked at number 44 on the Billboard R&B Singles chart.

Leschea was released from Warner Bros. after the production company complained of poor marketing and promotions. She has been married to executive producer Masta Ace since 2001, and they have one daughter together. Currently, Leschea hosts an online radio program called "The Leschea Show," which won the Online Radio Awards for Best Online Talk Show, Culture in 2016 on Mixcloud.com. The show broadcasts weekly on Periscope and Facebook Live.

== Discography ==
=== Solo albums ===
| Title | Album details | Singles |
|---|---|---|
| Rhythm and Beats | Released: June 17, 1997; Formats: CD, Vinyl, Digital download; Label: Warner Bros. | "How We Stay/Fulton St." |

=== Albums from Masta Ace Incorporated ===
| Title | Album details | Peak chart positions | Singles |
|---|---|---|---|
| SlaughtaHouse | Released: May 4, 1993; Label: Delicious Vinyl | Billboard 200 chart position: #134; R&B/Hip-Hop chart position: #32 | "Jeep Ass Niguh"/"SlaughtaHouse" "Saturday Nite Live"/"Style Wars" "Born to Roll" |
| Sittin' On Chrome | Released: May 2, 1995; Label: Delicious Vinyl | Billboard 200 chart position: #69; R&B/Hip-Hop chart position: #19 | "Born to Roll" "The I.N.C. Ride"/"The Phat Kat Ride" "Sittin' on Chrome" "Turn it Up" |
