= Sittin' on Chrome =

1995 studio album by Masta Ace Incorporated

- CD cover art

Studio album by Masta Ace Incorporated
- Released: May 2, 1995
- Recorded: 1992,1994
- Studios: Firehouse Studios (Brooklyn, NYC)
- Genre: East Coast hip hop
- Length: 1:08:13
- Label: Delicious Vinyl
- Producers: Orlando Aguillen (exec.); Bluez Brothas; Louie Vega; Masta Ace; Uneek

Masta Ace chronology
| SlaughtaHouse (1993) | Sittin' on Chrome (1995) | Disposable Arts (2001) |

Singles from Sittin' on Chrome
- 1. "Born to Roll" Released: 1994; 2. "The I.N.C. Ride" Released: 1995; 3. "Sittin' on Chrome" Released: August 22, 1995; 4. "Turn It Up" Released: 1996

Professional ratings
Review scores
| Source | Rating |
|---|---|
| AllMusic | 4/5 stars |
| RapReviews | 9/10 |
| The Source | 3.5/5 stars |

Sittin' on Chrome is the second and final studio album by American hip hop group Masta Ace Incorporated and the third album by Brooklyn-based rapper Masta Ace. It was released on May 2, 1995, through Delicious Vinyl. The recording sessions took place at Firehouse Studios in Brooklyn. The album was produced by Masta Ace under his producer moniker 'Ase One', as well as the Bluez Brothas, Louie "Phat Kat" Vega, and Uneek, with Orlando Aguillen serving as executive producer. It peaked at number 69 on the Billboard 200 and number 19 on the Top R&B/Hip-Hop Albums in the United States.

Ace followed the success of his 1994 hits "Jeep Ass Niguh" and "Crooklyn" (released with the Crooklyn Dodgers) with his most commercially successful album, which concentrated more on the West Coast hip hop/gangsta rap sound that particularly became a popular trend among many artists nationwide since the mega-success of Dr. Dre's The Chronic.

Sittin' on Chrome features the crossover hit "Born to Roll" (the West Coast remix of "Jeep Ass Niguh"), which peaked at #23 on the Billboard Hot 100 and was originally released as a hidden track on his SlaughtaHouse album, as well as two more Hot 100 hit singles, "The I.N.C. Ride" and the title track. A year after the release, Ace split with the I.N.C. crew and was largely missing from the hip hop scene, until his comeback album, Disposable Arts, was released in 2001.

== Track listing ==
| No. | Title | Writer(s) | Producer(s) | Length |
|---|---|---|---|---|
| 1. | "Intro" | Duval Clear; Norman Glover; Reginald Ellis | The Bluez Brothers | 2:54 |
| 2. | "The I.N.C. Ride" | Clear; Luis Vega; Chris Jasper; Ernie Isley; Marvin Isley; O'Kelly Isley Jr.; Ronald Isley; Rudolph Isley | Luis "Phat Kat" Vega | 4:10 |
| 3. | "Eastbound" | Clear; Ellis | Ase One | 4:29 |
| 4. | "What's Going On!" | Clear; Glover; Ellis | The Bluez Brothers; Ase One (co.) | 5:44 |
| 5. | "The B-Side" | Clear; Paula Perry; Ellis | Ase One | 4:14 |
| 6. | "Sittin' on Chrome" | Clear | Ase One | 4:07 |
| 7. | "People in My Hood" | Clear; Sean McFadden | Uneek | 5:37 |
| 8. | "Turn It Up" | Clear; Schea Boatwright; Roy Ayers | Ase One; The Bluez Brothers (co.) | 5:15 |
| 9. | "U Can't Find Me" | Clear; Ellis; Claydes Charles Smith; Dennis Thomas; George Brown; Rick Westfield; Robert Bell; Ronald Bell; Robert Mickens | Ase One | 4:13 |
| 10. | "Ain't No Game" | Clear; Perry; Ellis | Ase One | 4:55 |
| 11. | "Freestyle?" | Clear; Glover; Ellis | The Bluez Brothers | 3:29 |
| 12. | "Terror" | Clear; Daryl Hall; John Oates | Ase One | 5:19 |
| 13. | "Da Answer" | Clear | Ase One | 4:56 |
| 14. | "4 da Mind" (featuring the Cella Dwellas) | Clear; Ellis; Alando Outlaw; Christopher Gerald | Ase One | 4:45 |
| 15. | "Born to Roll" | Clear; Andre Brown; Eric McIntosh; Tyrone J. Kelsie | Ase One | 4:14 |
| 16. | "The Phat Kat Ride" | Clear; Vega | Luis "Phat Kat" Vega | 4:05 |
| Total length: | | | | 1:08:13 |

== Personnel ==
- Duval "Masta Ace"/"Ase One" Clear – performer (tracks: 1–7, 9–16), producer (tracks: 3, 5–6, 8–10, 12–15), co-producer (track 4), mixing, remixing (track 2)
- Reginald "Lord Digga" Ellis – performer (tracks: 2, 3, 5, 9, 10, 12, 14, 16), producer (tracks: 1, 4, 11), co-producer (track 8), mixing
- Leschea A. Boatwright – performer (tracks: 5, 8, 10, 12, 13)
- Paula Perry – performer (tracks: 3, 5, 10, 16)
- Norman "Witchdoc" Glover – producer (tracks: 1, 4, 11), co-producer (track 8)
- Louis "Phat Kat" Vega – producer (tracks: 2, 16)
- Sean "Uneek" McFadden – producer (track 7)
- Orlando Aguillen – executive producer
- Blaise Dupuy – recording
- Ethan Ryman – recording
- Frantz Verna – recording
- James Mansfield – mixing
- Brian "Big Bass" Gardner – mastering
- Tony Dawsey – mastering
- Truly Rain – art direction
- Studio S.E.E. – design
- Brian "B+" Cross – photography
- Donavin "Kid Styles" Murray – illustration
- Jonathan Pollack – management

== Charts ==
| Chart (1995) | Peak position |
|---|---|
| US Billboard 200 | 69 |
| US Top R&B/Hip-Hop Albums (Billboard) | 19 |

=== Singles chart positions ===
| Year | Song | Chart positions | | | |
| Year | Song | Billboard Hot 100 | Hot R&B/Hip-Hop Singles & Tracks | Hot Rap Singles | Hot Dance Music/Maxi-Singles Sales |
|---|---|---|---|---|---|
| 1994 | "Born to Roll" | 23 | 33 | 5 | 11 |
| 1995 | "The I.N.C. Ride" | 69 | 44 | 8 | 10 |
| 1995 | "Sittin' on Chrome" | 84 | 67 | 16 | 25 |
