= SlaughtaHouse =

Studio album by Masta Ace Incorporated
- Released: May 4, 1993
- Studios: Firehouse (Brooklyn, NYC)
- Genre: Hip hop
- Length: 1:05:05
- Label: Delicious Vinyl
- Producers: Bluez Brothas; Latief; Masta Ace; the Beatheads; Uneek

Masta Ace chronology
Take a Look Around (1990)	SlaughtaHouse (1993)	Sittin' On Chrome (1995)

Singles from SlaughtaHouse
- 1. "Jeep Ass Niguh / Saturday Nite Live" Released: August 1992; 2. "Slaughtahouse" Released: July 1993; 3. "Born to Roll" Released: January 1994

Professional ratings
Review scores
Source	Rating
AllMusic	4.5/5 stars
RapReviews	8.5/10
The Source	3.5/5 stars

SlaughtaHouse is the debut studio album by American hip hop group Masta Ace Incorporated and the second album by Brooklyn-based rapper Masta Ace. It was released on May 4, 1993, through Delicious Vinyl. The recording sessions took place at Firehouse Studios in Brooklyn. The album was produced by Masta Ace under his producer moniker "Ase One", as well as the Bluez Brothas, Uneek, Latief, and the Beatheads, with Orlando Aguillen serving as executive producer. It peaked at number 134 on the Billboard 200 in the United States.

The loose concept of the album is addressing the growing trend of violence in hip-hop music at the time, notably from gangsta rap. He addresses this satirically in the over-the-top single "Slaughtahouse". The album infuses West Coast funk-influenced beats with rough "New York rhyming". The 2008 repress of the album includes the single "Born to Roll", a bass-heavy remix of "Jeep Ass Niguh". This version became a hit single in 1994, reaching the Top 25 on the Billboard Hot 100. The song also presaged a new bass-heavy direction on his next album, Sittin' on Chrome.

The album was reissued twice in recent years. The first reissue was released in 2008. The second reissue was released in December 2013 as a deluxe edition with a second disc of 17 additional remixes, accapellas and rarities.

== Track listing ==
No.	Title	Writer(s)	Producer(s)	Length
1.	"A Walk Thru the Valley"	Duval Clear; Sean McFadden	Uneek	3:37
2.	"SlaughtaHouse" / "Diggadome (Intro)"	Clear; Courtney McFadden; S. McFadden	Uneek	4:50
3.	"Late Model Sedan"	M.F. Horn; Clear; Anthony King	Latief; Ase One	3:52
4.	"Jeep Ass Niguh" (Remix)	Clear; Norman Glover; Reginald Ellis	The Bluez Brothers	4:43
5.	"The Big East"	Clear; Christian Schneider; Jochen Wenke	The Beatheads; Ase One	4:19
6.	"Jack B. Nimble"	Clear; S. McFadden	Uneek; Ase One	2:52
7.	"Boom Bashin'"	Clear; S. McFadden	Ase One; Uneek	4:10
8.	"The Mad Wunz"	Clear; King	Ase One; Latief	5:09
9.	"Style Wars"	Clear	Ase One; the Bluez Brothers	4:28
10.	"Who U Jackin'?"	Clear; Paula Perry; Glover; Ellis	The Bluez Brothers	5:25
11.	"Rollin' wit UmDada"	Clear; S. McFadden; King	Ase One; Uneek; Latief	5:07
12.	"Ain't U da Masta"	Clear; Glover; Ellis	The Bluez Brothers; Ase One	4:39
13.	"Crazy Drunken Style"	Clear; Ellis; Glover	The Bluez Brothers	3:31
14.	"Don't Fuck Around" (Outro)	R. Sylvers; S. McFadden; Fatima Nickels	Ase One	2:24
15.	"Saturday Nite Live"	S. McFadden; Clear; Ellis; C. McFadden	Uneek	5:59
Total length:				1:05:05

2006 repress bonus track
No.	Title	Writer(s)	Producer(s)	Length
16.	"Born to Roll"	Clear	Ase One	4:14

Deluxe edition (2012 reissue bonus disc)
No.	Title	Length
16.	"Jeep Ass Niguh" (Dusted Mix)
17.	"Jeep Ass Niguh" (Bizcapella)
18.	"Jeep Ass Niguh" (Bonus Beats)
19.	"Jeep Ass Niguh" (O.G. Subwoofer Mix)
20.	"Jeep Ass Gutter" (Aaron LaCrate & Debonair Samir Remix)
21.	"Jeep Ass Gutter" (Aaron LaCrate & Debonair Samir Remix Instrumental)
22.	"Saturday Nite Live" (LP Version Instrumental)
23.	"Saturday Nite Live" (Dub)
24.	"Saturday Nite Live" (L.A. Jay Remix)
25.	"Saturday Nite Live" (L.A. Jay Remix Instrumental)
26.	"Saturday Nite Live" (L.A. Jay Remix Acapella)
27.	"Saturday Nite Live" (L.A. Jay Beats)
28.	"Saturday Nite Live" (Horny Mix)
29.	"Saturday Nite Live" (Horny Beats)
30.	"Slaughtahouse" (Murder Mix)
31.	"Slaughtahouse" (Death Mix)
32.	"Style Wars" (Remix)
33.	"Style Wars" (Remix Instrumental)

== Personnel ==
- Duval "Masta Ace"/"Ase One" Clear – performer (tracks: 1–13, 15), producer (tracks: 6–9, 11, 14), co-producer (tracks: 3, 5, 12), arranger (track 2), recording, mixing, art direction
- Sean "Uneek"/"MC Negro" McFadden – performer (tracks: 2, 15), producer (tracks: 1, 2, 6, 15), co-producer (track 7)
- Courtney "Eyce"/"The Ignorant MC" McFadden – performer (tracks: 2, 14, 15)
- Reginald "Lord Digga" Ellis – performer (tracks: 2, 5, 7–9, 13, 15), producer (tracks: 4, 10, 12, 13), co-producer (track 9)
- Paula Perry – performer (tracks: 2, 10)
- Leschea A. Boatwright – performer (track 14)
- Anthony "Latief" King – producer (tracks: 3, 8), co-producer (track 11)
- Norman "Witchdoc" Glover – producer (tracks: 4, 10, 12, 13), co-producer (track 9)
- Christian Schneider – producer (track 5)
- Jochen Wenke – producer (track 5)
- Orlando Aguillen – executive producer
- Blaise Dupuy – recording, mixing
- Tony Dawsey – mastering
- George DuBose – art direction, design, photography

== Charts ==
Chart (1993)	Peak position
US Billboard 200	134
US Top R&B Albums (Billboard)	32
US Heatseekers Albums (Billboard)	6
