= Masta Ace =

American rapper (born 1966)

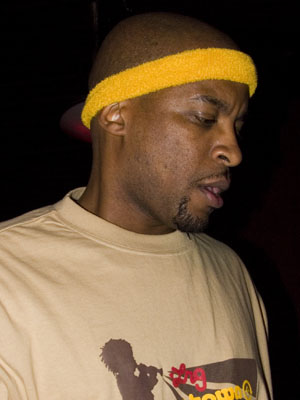
- Masta Ace performing in 2005

Background information
- Also known as: Ase One; Eca Retsam
- Born: Duval Clear; December 4, 1966 (age 59); Brooklyn, New York City, U.S.
- Education: University of Rhode Island (BS)
- Genre: Hip hop
- Occupations: Rapper; songwriter; record producer
- Years active: 1988–present
- Labels: Cold Chillin'; Reprise; Warner Bros.; Delicious Vinyl; Big Beat; JCOR; Interscope; Universal; Yosumi; M3
- Formerly of: Crooklyn Dodgers; eMC; Masta Ace Incorporated; Juice Crew

Duval Clear (born December 4, 1966), better known by his stage name Masta Ace, is an American rapper and record producer from New York City. A lead member of Mr. Magic's hip hop collective Juice Crew, he is best known for his guest appearance alongside Kool G Rap, Craig G and Big Daddy Kane on the group's 1988 posse cut "The Symphony". He is noted for his distinct voice and rapping proficiency.

== Biography ==
=== 1988–1994 ===
Clear graduated from the University of Rhode Island in 1988, after meeting Marley Marl in 1987 during his summer break. Ace made his recording debut on the Juice Crew posse-cut "The Symphony", along with fellow Juice Crew members Craig G, Kool G Rap and Big Daddy Kane, released on Marley Marl's In Control album. The album also featured two additional Ace tracks, "Keep Your Eyes on the Prize" and "Simon Says".

In 1989, he released his first solo single, "Together" b/w "Letter to the Better". A year later, his debut album, Take a Look Around, was released through Marl's Cold Chillin' label, featuring production from Marl and DJ Mister Cee. The album featured two minor hit singles in "Music Man" and "Me & The Biz", the latter track including Ace impersonating Biz Markie who did not reach the studio for the planned duet.

In the years following his debut, Ace developed bitter feelings toward the commercial state of hip hop music and the prominence of Gangsta rap. Released in 1993, SlaughtaHouse saw Ace express these feelings through a loose concept of the album lampooning a Gangsta rap persona that Ace portrayed as cartoonish and inauthentic. The album featured Ace's new crew, Masta Ace Incorporated, which included members Eyceurokk, Lord Digga, Paula Perry and R&B vocalist Leschea. The singles "SlaughtaHouse", "Saturday Nite Live", "Style Wars" and "Jeep Ass Niguh" were taken from the album. A remix of the latter – titled "Born to Roll" – became a crossover single in 1994, peaking at No. 23 on the Billboard Hot 100 chart. In the same year, Ace became a member of a temporary crew Crooklyn Dodgers, formed for the release of Spike Lee's movie, Crooklyn, along with MCs Special Ed and Buckshot of Black Moon, and recorded the title track of the album soundtrack. The song became Ace's second Hot 100 hit in 1994, peaking at No. 60 on the chart.

=== 1995–2000 ===
Ace furthered his mainstream appeal in 1995, with his radio-friendly Sittin' on Chrome album. This effort was also released with the Masta Ace Incorporated crew, now also known as The I.N.C. The album was Ace's most commercially successful release, breaking into the Top 20 on Billboard's Top R&B/Hip Hop Albums chart. Sittin' On Chrome included "Born to Roll", as well as two other Hot 100 hit singles, "The I.N.C. Ride" and "Sittin' on Chrome". By this time, Ace had become fully involved in his music on the production end as well, usually under the name Ase One. Following the album's success, Ace had a falling out with I.N.C. members Lord Digga and Paula Perry, leading to the breakup of the crew. After the split, Ace was largely missing from the hip hop scene over the next five years, save for a number of random vinyl singles. During his vinyl days, he bounced from a number of labels, releasing his "Cars" single on Tape Kingz Records, his "Yeah Yeah Yeah" and "NFL" singles on the Union Label, his "NY Confidential" single on Replay Records, his "Express Delivery" single on Three Sixty Records, his "Spread It Out/Hellbound" single on Yosumi Records, his "Conflict" single on Mona Records, his "Ghetto Like" single on Fat Beats, his "So Now U A MC" single on Bad Magic Records, and his "Brooklyn Blocks" single on Buckshot's Duck Down Records.

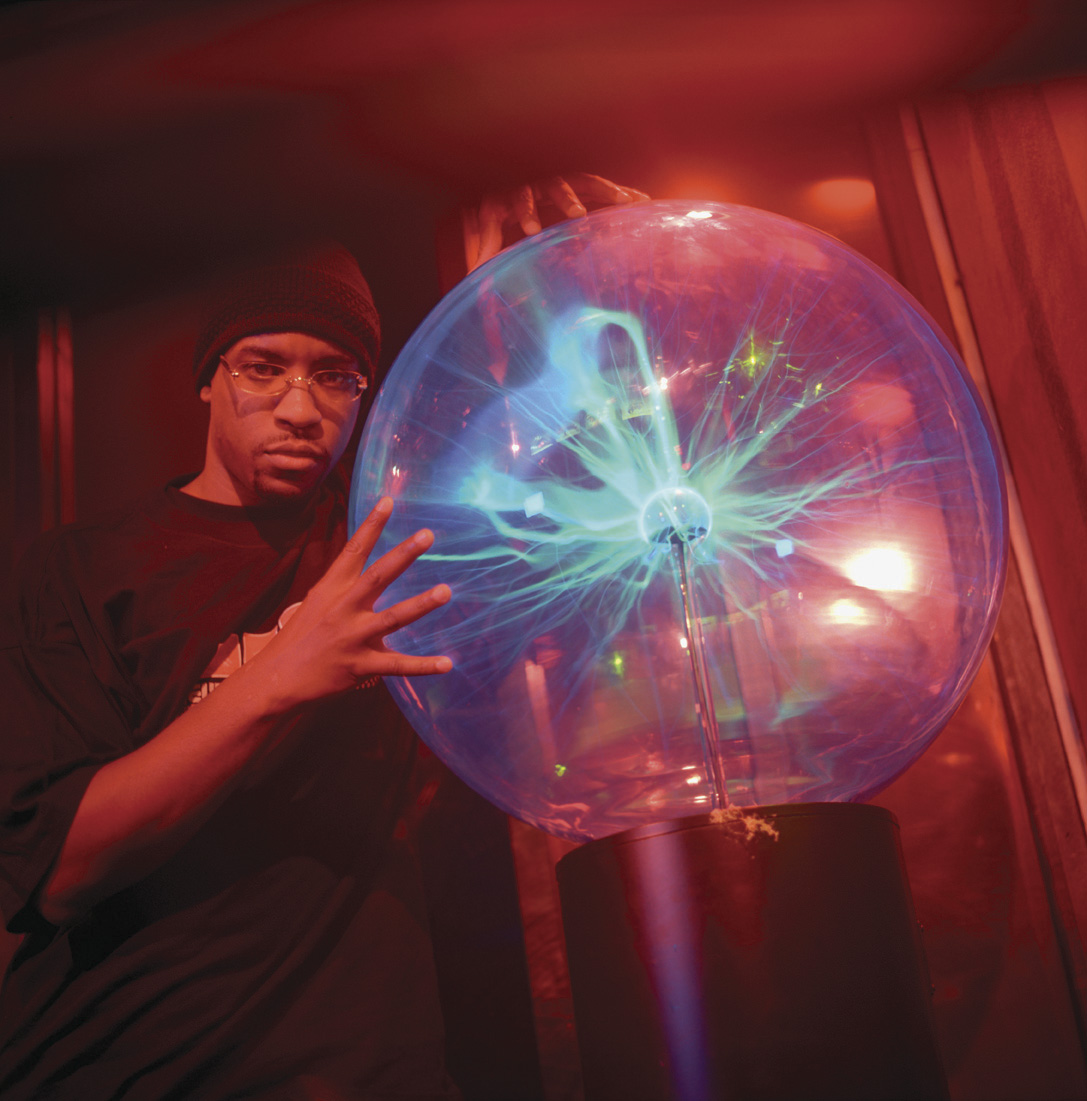
Masta Ace in 2001

=== 2001–present ===
Ace's "Ghetto Like" single led to a misunderstanding with an underground emcee named Boogieman, who released a somewhat similar single titled "Ghetto Love" which was released on 420recordings not long before. He thought that Ace was "biting" his track and released a diss song toward Ace titled "Just You Wait". Ace responded to Boogieman on the diss track "Acknowledge", which also dissed The High & Mighty over a misunderstanding. The trading of records led to a rap battle between the two at a Lyricist Lounge event. "Acknowledge" was also included on Ace's 2001 album, Disposable Arts. Masta Ace also performed numerous "Dubtitled" voice overs on the television series titled Kung Faux.

Disposable Arts, a concept album chronicling Ace's time spent at a satirical rap school named the "Institute of Disposable Arts", became one of the most acclaimed underground hip hop releases of 2001. JCOR Records folded soon after the release, leaving it out-of-print, until being re-released in 2005 on Ace's self-established M3 label. The album closer, "No Regrets", led many fans to believe that it would be Ace's final album, because of the line "I don't know if it's the end, but yo, it might be". Ace killed the rumors by returning in 2004 with his fifth album A Long Hot Summer, another highly acclaimed effort. The story concept, similar to that on his last release, served as a prelude to the story told on Disposable Arts, chronicling the "Long Hot Summer" that led to his character's incarceration at the beginning of the Disposable Arts album. Subsequently, Ace announced the formation of his new rap crew named eMC, including himself, Punchline, Wordsworth and his protégé Strick. Ace remarked in a December 2006 interview that he would no longer record as a solo artist, only with eMC. eMC's first group album, The Show, was scheduled for early 2007 but was released in February 2008 digitally and April 2008 physically.

In 2007, Masta Ace had a track included on the Official Joints mixtape, a compilation of previously unreleased tracks by various NYC rappers.

In 2009, Masta Ace joined forces with Boston rapper Ed O.G. to release Arts & Entertainment which was released on November 3, 2009. Arts & Entertainment got shortened to A&E which resulted in the cable TV channel A&E asking Masta and Edo to remove the symbol from their original album artwork. The albums already printed have been sold at live shows following the release of the record.

In 2011 and in 2012 he coached high school football for the Irvington Blue Knights in NJ.

In 2012, Masta Ace released MA Doom: Son Of Yvonne, produced entirely by MF Doom. In an interview, Ace explained that he devised the Son of Yvonne album to express things he had been unable to say to his mother before she died.

In January 2014, Masta Ace reunited with Stricklin, Wordsworth and Punchline as eMC, signing a record deal with Penalty Entertainment and Sony Red. They're expected to release an EP in April 2014, followed by a sophomore LP due out in early 2015. Punchline left the group in October 2014.

Later in 2014, it was announced that Masta Ace signed to M3 Records/Penalty Entertainment for his next solo album, The Falling Season. This album was ultimately released in 2016. In 2016, Masta Ace was interviewed by Ryan Maxwell for Hip-Hop Kings. The interview spoke in depth about the Disposable Arts re-issue, and the documentary which celebrated 20 years of the album. At the end of the interview, Masta Ace also confirmed he has begun filming another documentary for his critically acclaimed album "A Long Hot Summer".

The producer Marco Polo announced in 2018 that he was producing a new Masta Ace album, produced entirely by himself, to be titled A Breukelen Story; this album was released on November 9, 2018. In June 2024, Masta Ace and Marco Polo's "P.P.E." was nominated for the Hollywood Independent Music Awards in the Adult Contemporary Hip Hop category.

== International work ==
Masta Ace was prominently the vocal artist on his co-authored track "Talkin' What I Feel" by the short-lived but hugely respected early 1990s British formed group Young Disciples fronted by Carleen Anderson . The track appeared on the classic soul, acid-jazz, dance 1991 album Road To Freedom heralded by some as one of the top albums of the decade, and also on the 1992 EP "Young Disciples".

He and Croatian producer Koolade made a song "Beautiful" that was on his album A Long Hot Summer.

He is featured on a song off of album Protuotrov ("Antidote") by Bosnian rapper Frenkie, the song is called Živili ("Live On") featuring Masta Ace & Phat Phillie and is produced by Edo Maajka.

He appeared on Czech hiphop group Prago Union's album "HDP", where he performed on the track "Beat and I a já und ich" along with German rapper Dendemann.

He also appeared on Polish rap group Familia H.P. album "42" on the track "Born In New York".

In 2003, he appeared on the Swedish rapper Chords' track "Get u awn" with Punchline. The track is on the album "The garden around the mansion".

Masta Ace travelled to Australia in 2008 to record for the Funkoars track "This is How" which came off the album The Hangover. The track sampled parts of the Masta Ace's 2004 track "Good Ol' Love". The Funkoars have made several references to Masta Ace in their lyrics as well as using samples in other works.

He is also featured on the track "Sminke" by the critically acclaimed Norwegian Hip Hop duo Karpe Diem. The title of the album is Aldri Solgt En Løgn (Never Sold a Lie). In English the word "Sminke" means makeup, and the song is about artists trading their image for what their record companies want it to be.

In 2007, he appeared on Admit It, a song by Swiss hip hop group Nefew from their album Off the Cuff.

In 2010, he appeared on "Set You Free" along with Wordsworth, a track by UK hip hop DJ/Producer "Skitz" from his album "The Sticksman".

In 2010, he appeared on "You don't know about it" alongside M-Dot, a track by French hip hop DJ/Producer DJ Jean Maron from his album "RUN MPC". It was the lead single of the album and received heavy radio rotations. (released on 12" and CD)

In 2012, he is featured on the track "Progression" by German DJ/Producer DJ Q-Fingaz from his album "Qllection". The same year, he is featured on "The Bridge", a song by Polish hip hop squad Slums Attack from album "CNO 2"

In 2014, he collaborated with Canberra-based Australian rapper Nix on the single "SHE".

On December 19, 2014, Ace was featured on a track called "My Style" with German Producer The Mighty Moe who also produced for Termanology, Reks and many more.

In 2014, he is featured alongside Tajai (from Souls Of Mischief) on the track "2 the Essence" by German Rapper Kool Savas from his album "Märtyrer"

In 2015, he appeared on "Thinking of You", a song by Swedish hip hop duo Professor P & DJ Akilles from their album "All Year, Every Year".

In 2015, he is featured alongside Kidaf & Nekfeu on the track "Nothing Changed" by German hip-hop/pop producer Shuko from his album "For The Love Of It".

In 2022, he is featured on the track "Unzerstörbar" by German Rapper Umse from his album "Séparée".

== Legacy ==
Masta Ace is considered to be a highly skilled and influential MC – music journalist Peter Shapiro describes him as "one of the great pure New York MCs", and Allmusic describes him as "truly an underappreciated rap veteran and underground luminary". Commenting on how Masta Ace is sometimes overlooked despite his skill, Rolling Stone says, "even the most avid fan of raw hip-hop lyricism can sometimes neglect to mention Masta Ace alongside hard-bitten champs such as Rakim, KRS-One, Big Daddy Kane, Slick Rick and Kool G Rap". Eminem mentions Masta Ace as one of his influences in his book The Way I Am, saying, "Masta Ace had amazing storytelling skills – his thoughts were so vivid". He mentions him again in the song "Lucky You", with the line "We need 3 Stacks ASAP, and bring Masta Ace back".

== Personal life ==
In 2000, he was diagnosed with multiple sclerosis, but he did not reveal it to the public until 2013.

== Discography ==
Solo albums

- Take a Look Around (1990)
- Disposable Arts (2001)
- A Long Hot Summer (2004)
- MA Doom: Son of Yvonne (2012)
- The Falling Season (2016)

Collaborative albums

- SlaughtaHouse (with Masta Ace Incorporated) (1993)
- Sittin' on Chrome (with Masta Ace Incorporated) (1995)
- The Show (with eMC) (2008)
- Arts & Entertainment (with Ed O.G.) (2009)
- The Turning Point EP (with eMC) (2014)
- The Tonite Show (with eMC) (2015)
- A Breukelen Story (with Marco Polo) (2018)
- Richmond Hill (with Marco Polo) (2024)
