= Sittin' on Chrome (EP) =

Single by Masta Ace Incorporated

from the album Sittin' on Chrome
- Released: August 22, 1995
- Recorded: 1994
- Genre: Hip hop
- Label: Delicious Vinyl
- Producer: Ase One (Masta Ace)

Professional ratings
Review scores
Source	Rating
AllMusic	2.5/5 stars

"Sittin' on Chrome" is a song by American hip hop crew Masta Ace Incorporated, released in August 1995 by Delicious Vinyl, as the third single from their second album, Sittin' on Chrome (1995). The song peaked at numbers 77 and 84 on the US Cash Box Top 100 and Billboard Hot 100 charts. A maxi-single features two alternate mixes, the "Pitkin Ave Mix" and the "Rockaway Ave Mix", as well as two previously unreleased tracks, which were later featured on Ace's Hits U Missed compilation in 2004.

== Track listing ==
#	Title	Producer(s)	Performer(s)
1	"Sittin' on Chrome"	Ase One	Masta Ace
2	"Sittin' on Chrome (Pitkin Ave Mix)"	Ase One	Masta Ace
3	"Sittin' on Chrome (Rockaway Ave Mix)"	Ase One	Masta Ace
4	"Ya Hardcore"	Ase One	Masta Ace, Lord Digga
5	"Maintain"	Ase One	Masta Ace, Lord Digga
6	"Sittin' on Chrome (Instrumental)"	Ase One	*Instrumental*
7	"Sittin' on Chrome (Rockaway Ave Mix) (Instrumental)"	Ase One	*Instrumental*

== Charts ==
Chart (1995)	Peak position
US Billboard Hot 100	84
US Hot Dance Music/Maxi-Singles Sales (Billboard)	25
US Hot R&B Singles (Billboard)	67
US Hot Rap Singles (Billboard)	16
US Cash Box Top 100	77
