= Take a Look Around (album) =

Studio album by Masta Ace
- Released: July 24, 1990
- Recorded: 1988–1990
- Studios: House of Hits (Chestnut Ridge, New York); Libra Digital Sound (Long Island City, New York)
- Genre: Hip hop
- Length: 1:08:58
- Labels: Cold Chillin'; Reprise; Warner Bros. 26179
- Producers: Marley Marl; Mister Cee; Masta Ace

Masta Ace chronology
Take a Look Around (1990)	SlaughtaHouse (1993)

Singles from Take a Look Around
- 1. "Together / Letter to the Better" Released: 1989; 2. "Me and the Biz" Released: June 7, 1990; 3. "Music Man" Released: 1990; 4. "Movin' On" Released: March 6, 1991

Professional ratings
Review scores
Source	Rating
AllMusic	4.5/5 stars
RapReviews	9/10

Take a Look Around is the debut solo studio album by American rapper Masta Ace. It was released on July 24, 1990, through Cold Chillin' Records with distribution via Reprise Records. The recording sessions took place at House of Hits in Chestnut Ridge, New York and at Libra Digital Sound in Long Island City. The album was produced by Marley Marl and Mister Cee. As of 2025, the album is not available on any streaming services.

== Background ==
After appearing on the classic hip hop crew cut "The Symphony" with the Juice Crew in 1988, Ace released his first single, "Together" b/w "Letter to the Better" in 1989. "Together" was included in the album as well as a remixed version of "Letter to the Better".

Released in June 1990, "Me and the Biz" (b/w "I Got Ta") peaked at #47 on the Hot R&B/Hip-Hop Songs and #8 on the Hot Rap Songs. The song, a tribute of sorts to labelmate Biz Markie, in which Ace plays the role of both himself and Biz (who reportedly couldn't make it to the studio for the actual collaboration he desired). A single for "I Got Ta" was released only in the UK and Europe.

Reaching a peak position of number thirteen on the Hot Rap Songs, the album's third single, "Music Man" (b/w "Ace Iz Wild"), remained on the chart for a total of nine weeks.

"Movin' On" (b/w "Go Where I Send Thee") was released on March 6, 1991, as the final single from Take a Look Around.

== Track listing ==
All tracks are written by Duval Clear.

No.	Title	Producer(s)	Length
1.	"Music Man"	Marley Marl; Masta Ace (co.)	4:03
2.	"I Got Ta"	Mister Cee; Masta Ace (co.)	4:27
3.	"Letter to the Better" (Remix)	Marley Marl; Masta Ace (co.)	3:15
4.	"Me and the Biz"	Marley Marl; Masta Ace (co.)	5:11
5.	"The Other Side of Town"	Marley Marl; Masta Ace (co.)	4:52
6.	"Ace Iz Wild"	Marley Marl; Masta Ace (co.)	4:51
7.	"Four Minus Three"	Marley Marl; Masta Ace (co.)	3:50
8.	"Can't Stop the Bum Rush"	Mister Cee; Masta Ace (co.)	5:09
9.	"Movin' On"	Marley Marl; Masta Ace (co.)	4:31
10.	"Brooklyn Battles"	Marley Marl; Masta Ace (co.)	3:52
11.	"Maybe Next Time"	Marley Marl; Masta Ace (co.)	4:39
12.	"Postin' High"	Mister Cee; Masta Ace (co.)	4:54
13.	"As I Reminisce"	Mister Cee; Masta Ace (co.)	5:02
14.	"Take a Look Around"	Marley Marl; Masta Ace (co.)	4:32
15.	"Together"	Marley Marl; Masta Ace (co.)	5:50
Total length:			1:08:58

== Sample credits ==
Music Man

- "Ben Casey Theme" by David Raksin
- "Nothing Is the Same" by Grand Funk Railroad

I Got Ta

- "Talkin' Loud and Sayin' Nothing" by James Brown

Letter to the Better

- "Take Some...Leave Some" by James Brown
- "Think (About It)" by Lyn Collins
- "Mickey's Monkey" by the Miracles
- "Keep on Dancing" by Alvin Cash

Me and the Biz

- "The Message" by Cymande

The Other Side of Town

- "Get Out of My Life, Woman" by Lee Dorsey
- "The Other Side of Town" by Curtis Mayfield
- "UFO" by ESG

Ace Iz Wild

- "C'mon Children" by Earth, Wind & Fire
- "Escape-Ism" by James Brown

Four Minus Three

- "Hard to Handle" by Otis Redding

Can't Stop the Bumrush

- "Razor Blade" by Little Royal and the Swingmasters
- "Get Up Offa That Thing" by James Brown

Movin' On

- "Keep on Movin'" by Soul II Soul
- "Kissing My Love" by Bill Withers
- "Don't Take It Personal" by Jermaine Jackson

Brooklyn Battles

- "If You Let Me" by Eddie Kendricks

Maybe Next Time

- "(You're Puttin') a Rush on Me" by Stephanie Mills
- "Soul Power" by James Brown

Postin' High

- "Street Life" by the Crusaders
- "High" by Skyy

As I Reminisce

- "One Man Band (Plays All Alone)" by Monk Higgins
- "N.T." by Kool & the Gang

Take a Look Around

- "The Revolution Will Not Be Televised" by Gil Scott-Heron

Together

- "Do You Have the Time" by the Younghearts
- "One Man Band" by Monk Higgins & the Specialites

== Personnel ==
- Duval Clear – vocals, co-producer
- Menia Sims – vocals (track 9)
- Eyceurokk – vocals (track 13)
- Mike and Jay a.k.a. Together Brothers – vocals (track 15)
- Andre Booth – keyboards (track 15)
- D.J. Steady Pace – scratches
- Marlon Williams – producer & engineering (tracks: 1, 3–7, 9–11, 14–15)
- Calvin Laburn – producer (tracks: 2, 8, 12, 13)
- Everett "Bizz-E" Ramos – engineering & mixing (tracks: 1, 3–7, 9–11, 14–15)
- Ivan Rodriguez – engineering & mixing (tracks: 1, 3–7, 9–11, 14–15)
- Chris Tergesen – engineering & mixing (tracks: 2, 8, 12, 13)
- DJ Clash – engineering & recording (tracks: 1, 3–7, 9–11, 14–15)
- Leon Lee – engineering & recording (tracks: 1, 3–7, 9–11, 14–15)
- Thomas 'On Time' – engineering & recording (tracks: 1, 3–7, 9–11, 14–15)
- Tony Aliprantis – engineering & recording (tracks: 2, 8, 12, 13)
- Tony Papamichael – engineering & recording (tracks: 2, 8, 12, 13)
- Benny Medina – executive producer
- Tyrone Williams – executive producer
- George DuBose – art direction, photography
- Aldo Sampieri – design

== Charts ==
Chart (1990)	Peak position
US Top R&B/Hip-Hop Albums (Billboard)	38
