= Jay Faires =

American businessman

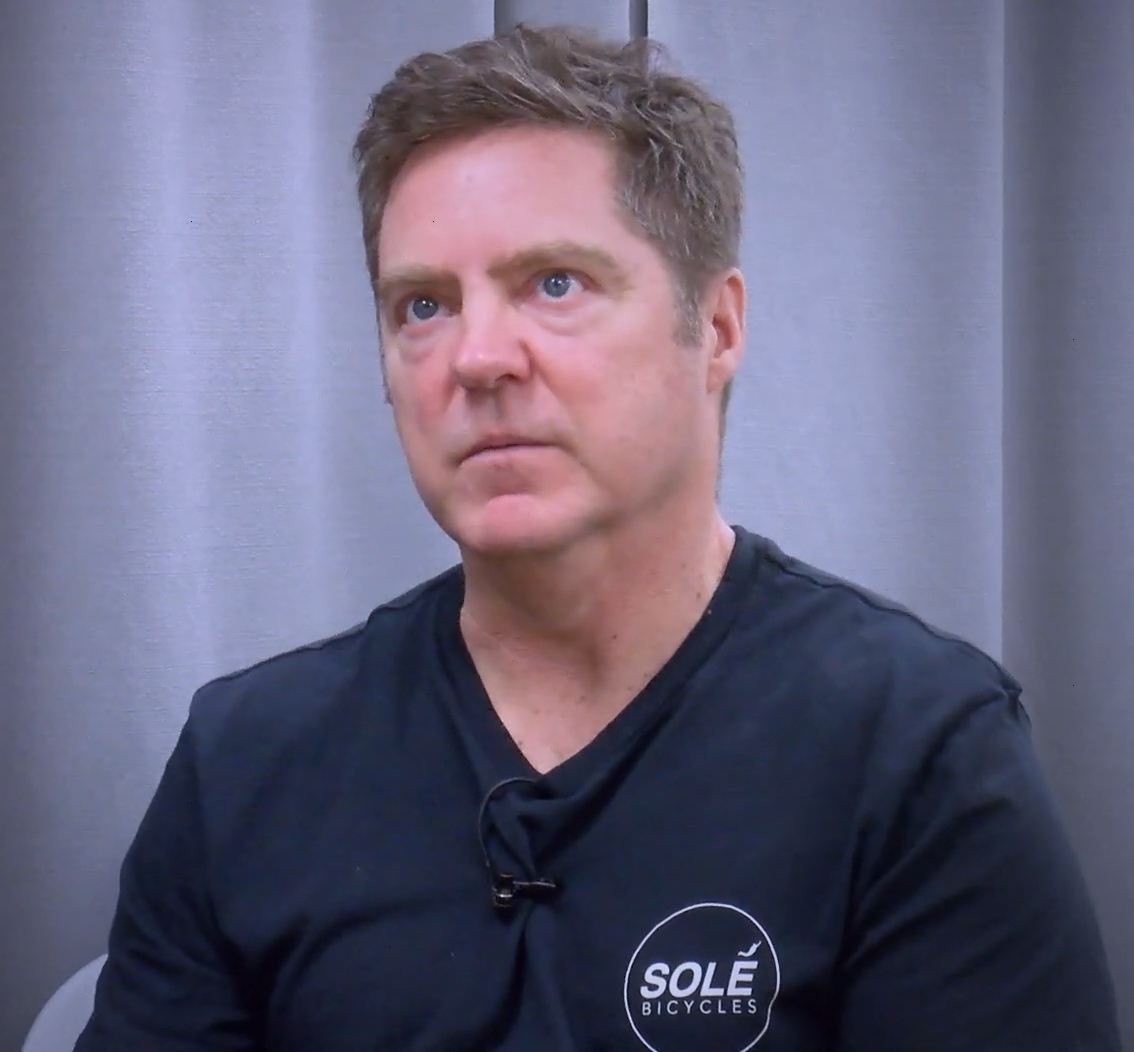
- Jay Faires in 2020
- Born: United States
- Occupation: Businessman

Jay Faires is an American music industry executive.

== BNY Music & Mammoth Records ==
Faires previously founded Mammoth Records, an independent record label, publishing and lifestyle marketing company in the Carrboro area of Chapel Hill, North Carolina. The label was the first independent label to produce two platinum records. Mammoth's roster included: Blake Babies, Chainsaw Kittens, Machines of Loving Grace, Juliana Hatfield, Joe Henry, Seven Mary Three, Squirrel Nut Zippers, Victoria Williams, The Sidewinders, Jason & the Scorchers, Frente!, The Bats, The Backsliders, Dash Rip Rock, Dillon Fence, Fun-Da-Mental, Fu Manchu, The Melvins and The Hope Blister among others. After placing three acts in the top 3 of MTV's charts, he sold the label to The Walt Disney Company. Faires then went on to build BNY Music, his music publishing company, acquiring blues catalog Black Top and many copyrights of David Bowie prior to its sale to Lionsgate.

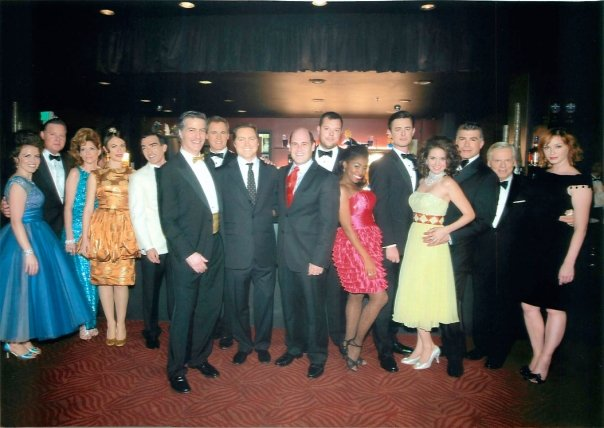
Lionsgate executive Jay Faires and Matthew Weiner, creator of the show, with "A Night on the Town with 'Mad Men' " cast, musical composer David Carbonara.

Faires has executive produced A Night on the Town with 'Mad Men' and concert films EDC: Experience, and the Coldplay concert film licensed to Epix.

== Atlantic Records, Disney, Lionsgate ==
As part of the Mammoth records JV, Faires became SVP of A&R at Atlantic Records where he oversaw the rock and alternative rosters. Later when he bought the company back from Atlantic and sold to Disney, he became an SVP there while running Mammoth.

At Lionsgate, Faires was President of Music and oversaw all music for their TV and film slates including such hits as Mad Men and the Oscar winning Crash. The music team received two Oscar nominations for Marco Beltrami's score for 3:10 to Yuma and Bird York's song "In The Deep" for Best Picture winner Crash. Lionsgate released 3 of the 5 soundtracks for the Best Television Golden Globe nominees of Californication, Mad Men and Weeds. While there, the value of the music publishing asset doubled.

== JCOR Entertainment ==
In 2000, Faires started a short lived label JCOR Entertainment, with distribution from Interscope Records. The label released albums from Tech N9ne, 8Ball & MJG, Masta Ace and Kam, among others before the label was folded in 2002.

== Education, board seats, awards, and non-profits ==
He earned a bachelor's degree with honors from The University of the South, where he was Young Alumnus of the Year in 2000, executive-in-residence for the Babson Center for Global Commerce in 2009 and sat on the university's board of trustees. He received his MBA from the Fuqua School of Business at Duke University where he gave the keynote address at the inauguration of their Center for Entrepreneurship in 2006. In 2008, he received the Joseph Papp Racial Harmony Award from the Foundation for Ethnic Understanding. He serves as an advisor or board member for Women @ the Frontier, 15X15, Invisible Children / 4th Estate and My Friend's Place.

== Mammoth Media Asia ==
In 2025 iHeartMedia announced a partnership with Mammoth Media Asia, naming Jay Faires and Jonathan Serbin as its founders. The venture's first podcast, focused on Bollywood industry news, was announced later that year.
