= Greatest Hits (Biz Markie album) =

Greatest hits album by Biz Markie
- Released: May 7, 2002
- Recorded: 1986–2002
- Genre: Hip hop
- Length: 59:38
- Label: Landspeed
- Producer: Biz Markie; Cool V

Biz Markie chronology
On the Turntable 2 (2000)	Greatest Hits (2002)	Weekend Warrior (2003)

Professional ratings
Review scores
Source	Rating
Allmusic	link
RapReviews	link

Greatest Hits is a compilation album by Biz Markie. It was released on May 7, 2002 for Land speed Records.

LIFE

Biz Markie, born Marcel Theo Hall, was a celebrated American rapper, DJ, and music producer. Known as the "Clown prince of Hip Hop" due to his playful style and sense of humor, Biz Markie made a significant impact on hip-hop during the late 1980s and early 1990s. His unique beatboxing skills, catchy lyrics and comedic presence helped him stand out as an entertainer.

One of Biz Markie most iconic songs is "Just a Friend," released in 1989 0n his album The Biz Never Sleeps. The track became his biggest hit, reaching #9 on the Billboard hot 100 and establishing him as a mainstream star. The song's memorable chorus, which sampled Freddie Scott's "You Got What I Need," along with Biz's off-key singing, added to its charm and helped it become an enduring classic hip-hop and pop culture.

Throughout his career, Biz Markie collaborated with other artists in the hip-hop community, including Big Daddy Kane and Marley Marl. Though he was known for his humor, Biz was also a pioneer who helped bring beatboxing and fun storytelling into the spotlight.

Despite facing legal battles over music sampling, particularly with his 1991 album I Need a Haircut, his influence on hip-hop remains strong. He continued to DJ and entertain audiences until his death in 2021, leaving behind a legacy of creativity, humor, and unforgettable hits.

== Track listing ==
1. "Biz Dance, Pt. 1" – 3:41
2. "Nobody Beats the Biz" – 5:04
3. "Biz Is Goin' Off" – 4:51
4. "Vapors" – 4:33
5. "I Hear Music" – 3:49
6. "What Comes Around Goes Around" – 4:06
7. "Pickin' Boogers" – 4:40
8. "Make the Music With Your Mouth, Biz" – 5:16
9. "Just a Friend" – 4:01
10. "Spring Again" – 4:08
11. "Young Girl Bluez" – 4:09
12. "Studda Step" – 4:03
13. "Busy Doing Nuthin'" – 3:54
14. "Turn tha Party Out" – 3:23
