= In Control Volume II (For Your Steering Pleasure) =

Studio album by Marley Marl
- Released: October 1, 1991
- Studio: House Of Hits (Chestnut Ridge, New York)
- Genres: East Coast hip-hop; golden age hip-hop
- Length: 58:30
- Label: Cold Chillin'
- Producers: Benny Medina (exec.); Francesca Spero (exec.); Tyrone Williams (exec.); Marley Marl

Marley Marl chronology
In Control, Volume 1 (1988)	In Control Volume II (For Your Steering Pleasure) (1991)	Hip Hop Dictionary (2000)

Singles from In Control Volume II (For Your Steering Pleasure)
- 1. "The Symphony, Pt. II" Released: September 5, 1991; 2. "Check the Mirror" Released: February 6, 1992

Professional ratings
Review scores
Source	Rating
AllMusic	3/5 stars
Chicago Tribune	3/4 stars
Robert Christgau	(choice cut)
The Source	3.5/5 stars

In Control Volume II (For Your Steering Pleasure) is the second studio album by American hip-hop record producer Marley Marl. It was released on October 1, 1991, via Cold Chillin' Records. Recording sessions took place at Marley's House Of Hits in Chestnut Ridge, New York. Production was handled by Marley Marl himself, with Benny Medina, Francesca Spero and Tyrone Williams serving as executive producers. It features guest appearances from Tragedy Khadafi, Big Daddy Kane, Craig G, Heavy D, Kool G Rap and Masta Ace, who contributed on In Control, Volume 1, as well as Big Money Wiz, Chubb Rock, Chuck D, Def Jef, Eclipse, Grand Puba, Kev-E-Kev & AK-B, King Tee, Little Daddy Shane, LL Cool J, MC Amazing, MC Cash, Mike Nice, Nexx Phase, Perfection, Portia Kirkland, Pure Cane Sugar, Rap Industry For Social Evolution and The Flex. Action, Biz Markie, MC Shan and Roxanne Shanté did not appear on this album.

The album peaked at number 152 on the Billboard 200 and number 46 on the Top R&B/Hip-Hop Albums in the United States. It spawned two singles: "The Symphony, Pt. II", a sequel to 1988 song "The Symphony", and "Check the Mirror". Its lead single, "The Symphony, Pt. II", made it to number nine on the Hot Rap Songs.

== Track listing ==
No.	Title	Writer(s)	Length
1.	"Intro"		0:18
2.	"No Bullshit"	Marlon Williams; Calvin Ray Spinner	3:27
3.	"The Symphony, Pt. II" (featuring Master Ace, Craig G., Big Daddy Kane, Kool G Rap and Little Daddy Shane)	Duval Clear; Craig Curry; Antonio Hardy; Nathaniel Wilson; Clayton Hardy; M. Williams	5:22
4.	"Level Check"		0:13
5.	"Buffalo Soldier" (featuring MC Amazing)	Joseph Chong; M. Williams	2:38
6.	"Mobil Phone"		0:03
7.	"At the Drop of a Dime" (featuring MC Cash)	Mitchell C. Ellington; M. Williams	2:59
8.	"Scanning the Dial"		0:25
9.	"Something Funky to Listen To" (featuring Nexx Phase)	Liel Williams; M. Williams	2:48
10.	"America Eats the Young" (featuring Tragedy the Intelligent Hoodlum and Chuck D)	Percy Chapman; M. Williams	3:45
11.	"Check the Mirror" (featuring Portia)	Portia Kirkland; M. Williams	3:01
12.	"I Be Gettin' Busy" (featuring L.L. Cool J)	James Todd Smith; M. Williams	4:43
13.	"Girl, I Was Wrong" (featuring The Flex)	Darren Lighty; Clifton Lighty; Eric Williams; M. Williams; The Corporation	2:38
14.	"Fools in Love" (featuring Heavy D. and Eclipse)	Dwight Myers; Damian "Deo" Blyden; M. Williams; Frankie Lymon	2:47
15.	"Another Hooker" (featuring Big Money Wiz)	Walter Nichols; M. Williams	3:28
16.	"Cheatin' Days Are Over" (featuring Mike Nice)	Michael Condon; Ike Lee; M. Williams	2:54
17.	"Reach Out" (featuring Perfection)	Cherelle Wright; D. Lighty; C. Lighty; E. Williams; M. Williams	5:09
18.	"Keep Control" (featuring Tragedy The Intelligent Hoodlum, King Tee, Grand Poobah, Def Jeff, Chubb Rock and Rap Industry For Social Evolution)	Chapman; Roger McBride; Maxwell Dixon; Jeffrey Fortson; Richard Simpson; M. Williams	4:48
19.	"Sweet Tooth" (featuring Pure Cane Sugar)	Lawrence Walford; David Donnell; M. Williams	3:13
20.	"Out for the Count" (featuring Kev-E-Kev & AK-B)	Kevin Thompson; Oliver Levy; M. Williams	3:43
Total length:			58:30

== Personnel ==
- Marlon "Marley Marl" Williams – main artist, producer, recording, mixing
- Duval "Masta Ace" Clear – featured artist (track 3)
- Craig "Craig G" Curry – featured artist (track 3)
- Antonio "Big Daddy Kane" Hardy – featured artist (track 3)
- Nathaniel "Kool G Rap" Wilson – featured artist (track 3)
- Clayton "Little Daddy Shane" Hardy – featured artist (track 3)
- Joseph "Amazin'" Chong – featured artist (track 5)
- Mitchell "MC Cash" Ellington – featured artist (track 7)
- Liel Williams – featured artist (track 9)
- Percy "Tragedy Khadafi" Chapman – featured artist (tracks: 10, 18)
- Carlton "Chuck D" Ridenhour – featured artist (track 10)
- Portia Kirkland – featured artist (track 11)
- James "LL Cool J" Smith – featured artist (track 12)
- Darren Lighty – featured artist (tracks: 13, 17), keyboards, programming
- Clifton Lighty – featured artist (tracks: 13, 17)
- Eric Williams – featured artist (tracks: 13, 17)
- Dwight "Heavy D" Myers – featured artist (track 14)
- Damien Blyden – featured artist (track 14)
- Walter "Big Money Wiz" Nichols – featured artist (track 15)
- Michael Condon – featured artist (track 16)
- Ike Lee – featured artist (track 16)
- Cherelle Wright – featured artist (track 17)
- Roger "King Tee" McBride – featured artist (track 18)
- Maxwell "Grand Puba" Dixon – featured artist (track 18)
- Jeffrey "Def Jef" Fortson – featured artist (track 18)
- Richard "Chubb Rock" Simpson – featured artist (track 18)
- Rap Industry For Social Evolution – featured artist (track 18)
- Lawrence Walford – featured artist (track 19)
- David Donnell – featured artist (track 19)
- Kevin "Kev-E-Kev" Thompson – featured artist (track 20)
- Oliver "AK-B" Levy – featured artist (track 20)
- Everett Ramos – engineering
- Frank Heller – engineering
- John Pace – engineering
- Peter Jorge – assistant engineering
- DJ Clash – assistant engineering
- Howie Weinberg – mastering
- Francesca Spero – executive producer, management
- Benny Medina – executive producer
- Tyrone Williams – executive producer
- JoDee Stringham – art direction, design
- Mark Seliger – photography
- Dee Joseph Garner – coordinator
- Karen Jones – A&R, management

== Charts ==
Chart (1991)	Peak position
US Billboard 200	152
US Top R&B/Hip-Hop Albums (Billboard)	46
