= In Control, Volume 1 =

Studio album by Marley Marl
- Released: September 20, 1988
- Genres: East Coast hip-hop; golden age hip-hop
- Labels: Cold Chillin'; Warner Bros.
- Producer: Marley Marl

Marley Marl chronology
In Control, Volume 1 (1988)	In Control Volume II (For Your Steering Pleasure) (1991)

Singles from In Control, Volume 1
- 1. "The Symphony" Released: 1988; 2. "Droppin' Science" Released: 1988

In Control, Volume 1 is the debut studio album by American hip-hop record producer Marley Marl, of the Juice Crew. It was released on September 20, 1988, through Cold Chillin' Records with distribution via Warner Bros. Records.

The album compiles ten studio recordings by fellow Juice Crew members and artists affiliated with Marley Marl. It showcased his style of hip-hop production and sampling at a time when he became one of the first super-producers in hip-hop. The album is broken down track-by-track by Marley Marl in Brian Coleman's book Check the Technique.

The opulent cover stood in contrast to Marley Marl's real living conditions: "I was still living in the projects. I was paying like $110 a month for my rent, free electricity. So New York City Housing Authority kind of co-produced some of my earlier hits".

== Critical reception ==
Professional ratings
Review scores
Source	Rating
AllMusic	4.5/5 stars
Robert Christgau	B+

Chris Witt of AllMusic wrote that: "Marley Marl's groundbreaking production and the strength of the various MCs showcased on In Control, Vol. 1 make the album a must for anyone even remotely interested in hip-hop's history." Ira Robbins of Trouser Press noted that "the album's diversity is to its credit, but Marl gives too much play to second-string rhymers, leaving the LP's few highlights (such as the Biz twigging Barry Manilow in 'We Write the Songs' and Shanté playing cute word games in 'Wack Itt') adrift on a sea of verbal boreplay."

In 2022, Rolling Stone placed In Control, Volume 1 at number 171 on their list of the 200 Greatest Hip-Hop Albums of All Time. The magazine's writer Christopher R. Weingarten said, "Not just a showcase for the funkiest producer of the early sampling era, not just the first attempt by a rap producer to step out as an artist, but a platform for the entire Juice Crew umbrella, easily the most powerful and virtuosic rap crew of the late Eighties."

== Track listing ==
No.	Title	Writer(s)	Length
1.	"Droppin' Science" (featuring Craig G)	Craig Curry; Marlon Williams	4:59
2.	"We Write the Songs" (featuring Heavy D and Biz Markie)	Dwight Myers; Marcel Theo Hall; Williams	5:25
3.	"The Rebel" (featuring Tragedy Khadafi)	Percy Chapman; Williams	3:46
4.	"Keep Your Eye on the Prize" (featuring Master Ace and Action)	Duval Clear; Williams	5:42
5.	"The Symphony" (featuring Master Ace, Craig G, Kool G Rap and Big Daddy Kane)	Clear; Curry; Nathaniel Wilson; Antonio Hardy; Williams	6:06
6.	"Live Motivator" (featuring Tragedy Khadafi)	Chapman; Williams	4:45
7.	"Duck Alert" (featuring Craig G)	Curry; Williams	4:12
8.	"Simon Says" (featuring Master Ace and Action)	Clear; Williams	4:02
9.	"Freedom" (featuring M.C. Shan)	Shawn Moltke; Williams	4:27
10.	"Wack Itt" (featuring Roxanne Shante)	Lolita Gooden; Williams	4:45

== Personnel ==
- Marlon "Marley Marl" Williams – main artist, producer, mixing
- Craig "Craig G" Curry – featured artist (tracks: 1, 5, 7)
- Marcel "Biz Markie" Hall – featured artist (track 2)
- Dwight "Heavy D" Myers – featured artist (track 2)
- Percy "Tragedy Khadafi" Chapman – featured artist (tracks: 3, 6)
- Duval "Masta Ace" Clear – featured artist (tracks: 4, 5, 8)
- Action – featured artist (tracks: 4, 8)
- Nathaniel "Kool G Rap" Wilson – featured artist (track 5)
- Antonio "Big Daddy Kane" Hardy – featured artist (track 5)
- Shawn "MC Shan" Moltke – featured artist (track 9)
- Lolita "Roxanne Shanté" Gooden – featured artist (track 10)
- George DuBose – photography
- James Colosimo – logo design

== Charts ==
Chart (1988)	Peak position
US Billboard 200	163
US Top R&B/Hip-Hop Albums (Billboard)	25
