= Grand Daddy I.U. =

American rapper (1968–2022)

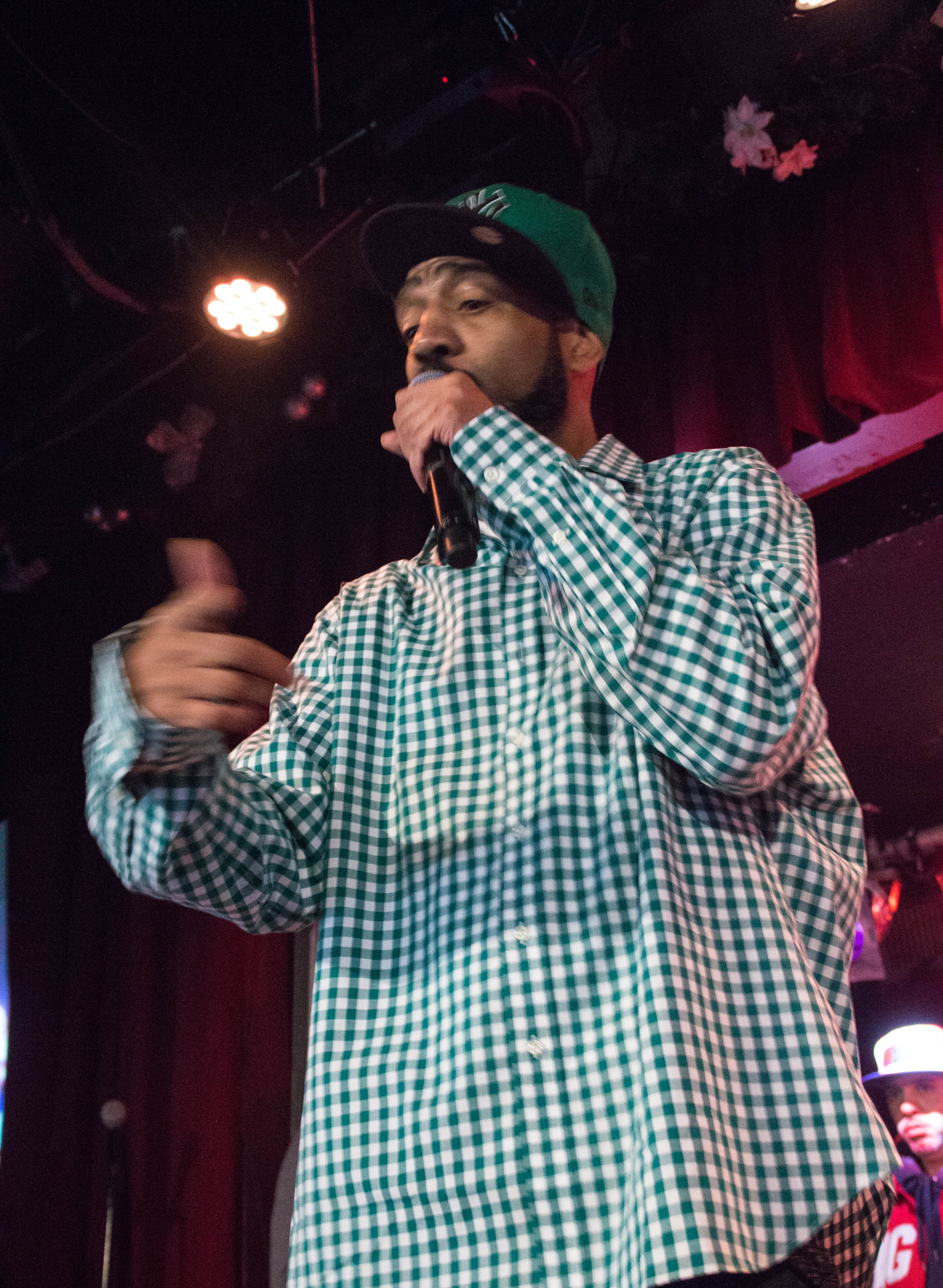
- Grand Daddy I.U. in 2016

Background information
- Born: Ayub Bey; August 23, 1968; Queens, New York City, U.S.
- Origin: Long Island, New York, U.S.
- Died: December 13, 2022 (aged 54)
- Genre: Hip hop
- Occupations: Rapper; songwriter
- Years active: 1989–1995; 2007–2022
- Labels: Steady Flow; Cold Chillin'/Reprise/Warner Bros.; Epic/SME
- Formerly of: Juice Crew

Ayub Bey (August 23, 1968 – December 13, 2022), known as Grand Daddy I.U., was an American rapper who was a member of the hip-hop collective Juice Crew during the 1980s.

== Early life ==
Grand Daddy I.U., born in Queens, was raised in Hempstead, Long Island, and encouraged to begin performing by his older brother, also known as Kay Cee. His parents separated when he was young. After his parents split up, I.U.'s mother regain all the records she had inside the house when they were together.

I.U. started rapping when he was incarcerated in jail after getting into rap battles with other inmates who liked his skills. I.U attended high school in Hempstead, while doing a rap talent show. His first hip-hop group was called the "Everlasting Four" with some of his friends at school. He would eventually get kicked out of his school for drinking alcohol.

== Career ==
He recorded a demo tape and gave it to Biz Markie, who signed him to the label Cold Chillin' Records in 1989. In 1990 he released his debut, Smooth Assassin, which spawned two Rap Chart hits: "Something New" (#11) which sampled James & Bobby Purify's "I'm Your Puppet", and "Sugar Free" (#9). He became noted for his high-end tailored attire, always appearing in public wearing a suit and tie.

Grand Daddy I.U. appeared as a guest on several hip hop albums in the 1990s, including Big L's Lifestylez ov da Poor & Dangerous and Positive K's The Skills Dat Pay da Bills.

Grand Daddy I.U. did ghostwriting and production work for Markie and Roxanne Shanté but became disenchanted with Markie over a dispute involving publishing credits for the tracks on his debut. He released a sophomore effort, Lead Pipe, in 1994. Its lead single "Represent" charted modestly on the US Dance Singles Chart. The album received little promotion, so after the standalone single "All About Money" in 1996, Grand Daddy I.U. quit rapping for nearly a decade.

Grand Daddy I.U. continued to do production work in hip-hop for Das EFX, Heltah Skeltah, KRS-One, and Ice-T among others. He issued a third album, Stick to the Script, in 2007, featuring production from Large Professor and Marco Polo and appearances from 2Pac, DV Alias Khryst, and Pudgee Tha Phat Bastard. In 2017 he reunited with long-time collaborator Pudgee Tha Phat Bastard on the album Still Hear by Long Island emcee Lantz. The pair featured together on two songs, "Til The Casket" and "Yesterday".

In 2020 I.U. released an album The Essence, which featured artists Method Man, Lil Fame, Sadat X, Craig G, Large Professor, and a host of other artists. The album was composed of songs all produced by I.U. and showcased his beat making talents.

After a short break from releasing music, Grand Daddy I.U released a new single "Stay Fly" under Get@Em Recordz on July 2, 2021.

== Personal life and death ==
Bey died on December 13, 2022, at the age of 54.

I.U.'s daughter is the soul singer Yaya Bey.

== Discography ==
=== Albums ===
| Year | Album | Peak chart positions |
| Year | Album | U.S. R&B |
|---|---|---|
| 1990 | Smooth Assassin: Released: September 18, 1990; Label: Cold Chillin' | 91 |
| 1994 | Lead Pipe: Released: June 21, 1994; Label: Cold Chillin' / Epic | 88 |
| 2007 | Stick to the Script: Released: October 22, 2007; Label: Steady Flow | – |
| 2015 | P.I.M.P. (Paper Is My Priority): Released: February 17, 2015; Label: Steady Flow | - |

=== Singles ===
- 1990 "Something New" (US Rap #11)
- 1990 "Sugar Free" (US Rap #9)
- 1990 "This Is A Recording"
- 1990 "Pick Up The Pace"
- 1994 "Represent" (US Dance #54)
- 1994 "Don't Stress Me"
- 1996 "All About Money"
- 2005 "I Be Thuggin'"
- 2021 "Stay Fly" (with Shawn Haynes & Monsta Mook)
- 2022 "Trust Me" (with Paula Perry & Da Inphamus Amadeuz)
