= The Best of Cold Chillin: Masta Ace =

The Best of Cold Chillin': Masta Ace

Greatest hits album by Masta Ace
- Released: May 22, 2001
- Genre: Hip hop
- Label: Cold Chillin'
- Producer: Marley Marl; Mister Cee

Masta Ace chronology
The Best of Cold Chillin': Masta Ace (2001)	Hits U Missed (2004)

Professional ratings
Review scores
Source	Rating
AllMusic	4.5/5 stars

The Best of Cold Chillin': Masta Ace is a compilation album released by Cold Chillin' Records, featuring songs released during Masta Ace's tenure at the label. The compilation features eleven of the fifteen songs originally released on Ace's debut Take a Look Around, as well as one single, one B-side, one remix, and the original version of "Letter to the Better".

== Track listing ==
1. "Music Man"
2. "Me & the Biz"
3. "Movin' On"
4. "Brooklyn Battles"
5. "Letter to the Better" [Original Version]
6. "Together"
7. "Can't Stop the Bum Rush"
8. "Maybe Next Time"
9. "Postin' High"
10. "As I Reminisce"
11. "I Got Ta"
12. "The Other Side of Town"
13. "Take a Look Around"
14. "Go Where I Send Thee"
15. "Movin' On" [Remix]
