= The Battle for Rap Supremacy =

The Battle For Rap Supremacy

Compilation album by KRS-One and MC Shan
- Released: November 19, 1996
- Genre: Golden age hip-hop
- Label: Cold Chillin' Records
- Producers: Blast Master KRS-One; Scott La Rock; Ced Gee; Marley Marl; MC Shan

KRS-One chronology
KRS-One (1995)	The Battle For Rap Supremacy (1996)	I Got Next (1997)

MC Shan chronology
Play it Again, Shan (1990)	The Battle for Rap Supremacy (1996)	The Best Of Cold Chillin': MC Shan (2001)

The Battle For Rap Supremacy: KRS-One Vs. MC Shan is a collection of songs by rappers KRS-One and MC Shan. It was released on LP and CD via Cold Chillin' Records in 1996 but is made up of the classic diss records KRS-One/Boogie Down Productions and MC Shan/The Juice Crew took shots at each other with during the infamous "Bridge Wars" in the late '80s and what is often considered the most memorable (as well as one of the first) hip-hop beefs that ever happened.

== Track listing ==
#	Title	Producer(s)	Performer(s)
A1	"The Bridge"	Marley Marl	MC Shan
A2	"Kill That Noize"	Marley Marl	MC Shan
A3	"Down By Law"	Marley Marl	MC Shan
A4	"I Pioneered This"	Marley Marl	MC Shan
A5	"Juice Crew Law"	Marley Marl	MC Shan
A6	"Project Ho"	Marley Marl	MC Shan
B1	"South Bronx"	KRS-One, Scott La Rock	KRS-One
B2	"The Bridge is Over"	KRS-One, Scott La Rock	KRS-One
B3	"Criminal Minded"	Ced Gee, Scott La Rock, KRS-One	KRS-One
B4	"Poetry"	Ced Gee, Scott La Rock, KRS-One	KRS-One
B5	"The P is Free ('87 Remix)"	Ced Gee, Scott La Rock, KRS-One	KRS-One
