= The Symphony (song) =

Single by Marley Marl featuring Masta Ace, Craig G, Kool G Rap and Big Daddy Kane

from the album In Control, Volume 1
- B-side: "Wack Itt"
- Released: 1988
- Recorded: 1987
- Genre: Golden age hip hop, gangsta rap, hardcore hip hop
- Label: Cold Chillin', Warner Bros.
- Songwriters: Marlon Williams; Duval Clear; Craig Curry; Nathaniel Wilson; Antonio Hardy
- Producer: Marley Marl

Music video
- "The Symphony" on YouTube

"The Symphony" is a rap song produced by Marley Marl featuring Juice Crew members Masta Ace, Kool G Rap, Craig G and Big Daddy Kane. The track appears on Marley Marl's 1988 Cold Chillin' Records release In Control, Volume 1. Rolling Stone ranked "The Symphony" the 48th greatest hip-hop song of all time, calling it "the first truly great posse cut".

== Song history ==
Marley Marl, who was working as a DJ for radio station WBLS, sampled the song's signature loop from a station copy of Otis Redding's "Hard to Handle". Marley Marl and his Juice Crew affiliates recorded "The Symphony" in Queens, immediately after posing in front of a Lear Jet for In Control, Volume 1's back-cover photography. Though this photo bespoke wealth, Marley Marl remembers, "I was still living in the projects. I was paying like $110 a month for my rent, free electricity. So New York City Housing Authority kind of co-produced some of my earlier hits." According to Masta Ace, Juice Crew member MC Shan was supposed to perform on this hit, but due to his success at the time, he told Marley that "he felt like he was belittling himself to be on a record with these new dudes." Meanwhile, Masta Ace, who made his recording debut with the song's opening verse, had not intended to be on the song at all; he only recorded his verse because the other MCs were hesitant to rhyme first.

== Song influence ==
The song's signature melodic line, a sample of Otis Redding's "Hard to Handle", has surfaced on Snoop Dogg's "Ghetto Symphony", Nas and The Firm's "Affirmative Action (Remix)", Mos Def's "Habitat" and other songs. Meanwhile, Big Daddy Kane's famous line, "Put a quarter in your ass 'cause you played yourself", pops up as a looped sample on the Beastie Boys' "Hey Fuck You". Along with earning the 48th spot in Rolling Stone's "The 50 Greatest Hip-Hop Songs of All Time", "The Symphony" ranks fifteenth in Ego Trip's list of rap's best posse cuts. Kool G. Rap's line "I'm on a rampage" is scratched into EPMD's "Rampage" which features LL Cool J. The song was sampled on UGK's 2007 cut "Next Up" also featuring Big Daddy Kane and Kool G Rap. This song also influenced the 2009 title "Renaissance Rap", by Q-Tip featuring Busta Rhymes, Raekwon and Lil Wayne as you'll hear Q-Tip repeat his own version of Marley Marl's intro and ending.

== Charts ==
=== Weekly charts ===
Chart (1988–1989)	Peak position
US Hot Rap Songs (Billboard)	20
