= The Kingpin (album) =

Studio album by Craig G
- Released: 1989
- Recorded: 1988–1989
- Studio: House of Hits (Chestnut Ridge, NY)
- Genre: Hip hop
- Length: 49:31
- Label: Atlantic
- Producer: Marley Marl

Craig G chronology
The Kingpin (1989)	Now, That's More Like It (1991)

Professional ratings
Review scores
Source	Rating
AllMusic	1.5/5 stars
RapReviews	1/10

The Kingpin is the debut studio album by American rapper Craig G. It was released in 1989 via Atlantic Records. The album was produced by Marley Marl.

== Track listing ==
No.	Title	Length
1.	"Love Thang"	4:40
2.	"Dopest Duo"	4:20
3.	"Rock the House"	5:06
4.	"First Day of School"	4:02
5.	"Shootin' the Gift"	3:44
6.	"Slammin'"	3:57
7.	"Turn This House into a Home"	5:42
8.	"The Kingpin"	3:20
9.	"The Final Chapter"	5:09
10.	"Why'd You Have to Go?" (featuring TJ Swan)	5:04
11.	"Smooth"	2:57
12.	"The Blues"	1:30
Total length:		49:31

Sample credits

- Track 2 contains elements from "A Quiet Storm" by Smokey Robinson (1975)
- Track 3 contains elements from "Rock the House (You'll Never Be)" by Pressure Drop (1983)
- Track 4 contains elements from "Long Red" by Mountain (1972), "Just a Friend" by Biz Markie (1989)
- Tracks 5 and 6 contain elements from "Think (About It)" by Lyn Collins (1972)
- Track 7 contains elements from "Firecracker" by Yellow Magic Orchestra (1978)
- Track 10 contains elements from "Soul Power 74" by Maceo & the Macks (1974)

== Personnel ==
- Craig Curry – main performer
- Marlon Lu'ree Williams – mixing & recording (tracks: 2, 5–7, 9, 11), producer
- Andre Carrillo – vocals (track 10)
- Thomas "On Time" – mixing & recording (tracks: 1, 4, 8, 10, 12)
- Leon Lee – mixing & recording (track 3)
- Dennis King – mastering
- Bob Defrin – art direction
- Anthony Ranieri – design
- Frank Moscati – photography
