= Biz's Baddest Beats =

Compilation album by Biz Markie
- Released: July 1, 1994
- Recorded: 1987–1994
- Genre: Hip hop
- Length: 64:07
- Label: Cold Chillin'
- Producer: Biz Markie; Cool V

Biz Markie chronology
All Samples Cleared! (1993)	Biz's Baddest Beats (1994)	On the Turntable (1998)

Professional ratings
Review scores
Source	Rating
Allmusic	4/5 stars

Biz's Baddest Beats is a compilation album by Biz Markie. It was released on July 1, 1994, on Cold Chillin' Records.

== Track listing ==
1. "One Two"- 2:20
2. "Make the Music With Your Mouth, Biz"- 4:56
3. "Biz Dance, Pt. 1"- 3:38
4. "Nobody Beats the Biz"- 5:42
5. "Just Rhymin' With Biz"- 4:01
6. "Pickin' Boogers"- 4:42
7. "Biz Is Goin' Off"- 4:50
8. "Vapors"- 4:33
9. "This Is Something for the Radio"- 5:14
10. "Just a Friend"- 4:00
11. "Spring Again"- 4:03
12. "What Comes Around Goes Around"- 4:05
13. "Let Me Turn You On"- 5:33
14. "Young Girl Bluez"- 4:07
15. "The Doo Doo"- 2:23
