= Play It Again, Shan =

Play it Again, Shan

Studio album by MC Shan
- Released: April 11, 1990
- Genre: Hip hop
- Label: Cold Chillin’; Warner Bros. 26155
- Producer: John Ficarrotta; MC Shan

MC Shan chronology
Born to Be Wild (1988)	Play it Again, Shan (1990)	The Battle for Rap Supremacy (1996)

Professional ratings
Review scores
Source	Rating
AllMusic	3/5 stars

Play It Again, Shan is the third and final album for Cold Chillin' Records by artist and Juice Crew member MC Shan. The album was released on April 11, 1990, under Cold Chillin' and Warner Bros. Records. Produced solely, without Marley Marl.

== Track listing ==
1. Ain't It Good To You (feat. Carole Davis)
2. I Ran The Game
3. Ain't We Funkin'
4. It Ain't A Hip Hop Record
5. Death Was Quite A Surprise
6. Walking On Sunshine
7. Rock Stuff
8. Clap Your Hands
9. Music You Can Dance To
10. Time For Us To Defend Ourselves
11. It Don't Mean A Thing
12. I Want To Thank You
13. Got To Be Funky
14. Mic Line
15. How I Feel About You

Vinyl version omits tracks 7, 8, 14 & 15.
