= All Samples Cleared! =

Studio album by Biz Markie
- Released: June 22, 1993
- Recorded: November 1992–March 1993
- Genre: Hip hop
- Length: 54:23
- Label: Cold Chillin'; Warner Bros.
- Producer: Biz Markie; Cool V

Biz Markie chronology
I Need a Haircut (1991)	All Samples Cleared! (1993)	Biz's Baddest Beats (1994)

Professional ratings
Review scores
Source	Rating
AllMusic	2.5/5 stars
Robert Christgau	A−
Rolling Stone	4/5 stars
The Source	3.5/5 stars

All Samples Cleared! is the fourth studio album by the American rapper Biz Markie. Produced by Biz Markie and his cousin Cool V, it was released on June 22, 1993, and was Biz Markie's final studio album released by Cold Chillin'/Warner Bros. Records. The title references a court battle over a sample Markie used on his 1991 song "Alone Again".

The album peaked at #43 on the Top R&B/Hip-Hop Albums, though the single "Let Me Turn You On" made it to #7 on the Hot Rap Singles. It was Markie's last studio album until 2003's Weekend Warrior.

== Track listing ==
1. "I'm the Biz Markie" – 4:08
2. "I'm a Ugly Nigga (So What)" – 4:57
3. "Young Girl Bluez" – 4:08
4. "Family Tree" – 2:18
5. "Let Me Turn You On" – 5:34
6. "The Gator (Dance)" – 4:03
7. "Groovin'" – 5:18
8. "I'm Singin'" – 5:12
9. "Hooker Got a Boyfriend" – 4:47
10. "Bad by Myself" – 5:07
11. "Funk Is Back" – 3:43
12. "Thanks" – 5:21

== Charts ==
Chart (1993)	Peak position
US Top R&B/Hip-Hop Albums (Billboard)	43
