= Goin' Off =

Studio album by Biz Markie
- Released: February 23, 1988
- Recorded: July–November 1987
- Genre: Golden age hip hop
- Length: 45:24
- Label: Cold Chillin'; Warner Bros.
- Producer: Marley Marl

Biz Markie chronology
Goin' Off (1988)	The Biz Never Sleeps (1989)

Singles from Goin' Off
- 1. "Vapors" Released: April 1988

Goin' Off is the debut album by American rapper Biz Markie. It was released by Cold Chillin' Records and produced by Marley Marl. Big Daddy Kane wrote the lyrics of the album's first five songs. The album also showcased Markie's talent as a human beatbox on the song "Make the Music with Your Mouth, Biz", and his skill in the game of dozens on the track "Nobody Beats the Biz". One of his most widely known songs, "Vapors", was on the album.

Some reissues from 1995 onwards replace the Marley Marl remix of "Make the Music with Your Mouth" with the original 12-inch version, the album version of "Vapors" with the remix, and the original "This Is Something for the Radio" with the remix. In 2006, the album was re-released by Traffic Entertainment Group with a bonus disc. It restores the original album versions of "Vapors" and "This Is Something for the Radio" as well as the Marley Marl remix of "Make the Music" that appeared on the original LP.

== Critical reception ==
Professional ratings
Review scores
Source	Rating
AllMusic	4.5/5 stars
Los Angeles Times	2/4 stars
NME	8/10
RapReviews	8/10
The Rolling Stone Album Guide	4/5 stars
The Village Voice	B

Reviewing for The Village Voice in July 1988, Robert Christgau highlighted "This Is Something for the Radio" and "Pickin' Boogers", which he called "timeless", but suggested the other singles had less "life".

In 1998, Goin' Off was selected as one of The Source's 100 Best Rap Albums.

The album is broken down track-by-track by Biz Markie in Brian Coleman's book Check the Technique.

== Track listing ==
- All tracks produced by Marley Marl.

No.	Title	Length
1.	"Pickin' Boogers"	4:42
2.	"Albee Square Mall"	4:43
3.	"Biz is Goin' Off"	4:50
4.	"Return of the Biz Dance"	3:59
5.	"Vapors"	4:33
6.	"Make the Music with Your Mouth, Biz" (featuring TJ Swan)	4:56
7.	"Biz Dance (Part One)"	3:38
8.	"Nobody Beats the Biz"	5:42
9.	"This Is Something for the Radio"	5:14
10.	"Cool V's Tribute to Scratching"	3:07

== Personnel ==
Contributors
Producers
Producer(s)	Marley Marl; Co-Producer(s) Biz Markie, DJ Cool V
Executive Producer(s)	Benny Medina
Performers
Lead vocals and rhyming	Biz Markie
Additional and background vocals	TJ Swan
Technicians
Mixing	Marley Marl, Big Daddy Kane, DJ Cool V
Engineering	Marley Marl, Andre Booth
Mastering	Carlton Batts
Photography	George DuBose
Design	George DuBose

== Singles ==
Singles
Title	B-Side	Release Date
"Vapors"
"Make the Music with Your Mouth, Biz" "The Biz Dance" "They're Coming To Take Me Away Ha-Haa"	"A One, Two" "The Biz Dance [Dub Version]" "Make the Music with Your Mouth, Biz [Instrumental]"	1986
"Nobody Beats the Biz"	"A One, Two" "Nobody Beats the Biz [Dub Version]"	1987
"Pickin' Boogers"	"A One, Two" "Pickin' Boogers [Dub Version]	1987
"Biz Is Goin' Off" "The Do Do (Bonus Beats)"	"A One, Two" "Biz Is Goin' Off [Dub Version]"	1988
"This Is Something for the Radio"	"This Is Something for the Radio [Dub Version]" "This Is Something for the Radio [Dub-Acapella]"	1988

== Charts ==
Chart (1988)	Peak position
US Billboard 200	90
US Top R&B/Hip-Hop Albums (Billboard)	19
