= Smooth Assassin =

Studio album by Grand Daddy I.U.
- Released: 1990
- Recorded: 1989–90
- Genre: Hip-hop
- Labels: Cold Chillin'; Reprise; Warner Bros.
- Producers: Biz Markie; Cool V

Grand Daddy I.U. chronology
Smooth Assassin (1990)	Lead Pipe (1994)

Smooth Assassin is the debut studio album by the American rapper Grand Daddy I.U., from Queens, New York. It was released in 1990 via Cold Chillin' Records. The album was produced by Biz Markie, with Cutmaster Cool V serving as the co-producer and mixer of the album.

== Critical reception ==
Professional ratings
Review scores
Source	Rating
AllMusic	2/5 stars
RapReviews	8.5/10

The Washington Post concluded that "Grand Daddy's rhymes and metaphors are often limited, his 'smooth' delivery is actually boring and the two add up to a real yawner of an album."

== Track listing ==
- All tracks produced by Biz Markie.
1. "The U Is Smooth" - 5:00
2. "Pick Up the Pace" - 4:22
3. "Something New" (featuring Desiree Price, Raezia Rolle & Toni Rolle) - 4:49
4. "I Kick Ass" - 5:05
5. "Mass Destruction" - 3:58
6. "Gals dem So Hot" - 4:40
7. "Girl in the Mall" - 4:47
8. "Kay Cee Is Nasty" - 1:56
9. "Nobody Move" - 4:27
10. "Dominos" - 4:24
11. "Behind Bars" - 4:29
12. "Soul Touch" - 4:16
13. "This Is a Recording" - 5:12
14. "Sugar Free" (featuring Mary Brown) - 5:01
15. "Phuck 'Em Up U" - 2:27
16. "Shout Outs" - 2:42

== Samples ==
The U Is Smooth

- "Hydra" by Grover Washington Jr.

Pick Up the Pace

- "Reggins" by the Blackbyrds
- "Love Rap" by Spoonie Gee

Something New

- "Papa Was Too" by Joe Tex
- "I'm Your Puppet" by James & Bobby Purify

I Kick Ass

- "White Lightning (I Mean Moonshine)" by James Brown
- "Think (About It)" by Lyn Collins

Mass Destruction

- "Storm King" by Bob James

Girl in the Mall

- "You Can Call Me Rover" by the Main Ingredient

Kay Cee Is Nasty

- "Synthetic Substitution" by Melvin Bliss
- "Escape-ism" by James Brown

Nobody Move

- "Red Baron" by Billy Cobham

Dominos

- "Blues and Pants" by James Brown
- "Dominoes" by Donald Byrd

Behind Bars

- "Yes We Can Can" by the Pointer Sisters

Soul Touch

- "Soul Touch" by Ronnie Mitchell

Sugar Free

- "Sugar Free" by Juicy
- "Funky President (People It's Bad)" by James Brown

Phuck 'Em Up U

- "The Message from the Soul Sisters" by Myra Barnes
