= Born to Be Wild (MC Shan album) =

Studio album by MC Shan
- Released: October 25, 1988
- Genre: Hip hop
- Label: Cold Chillin’; Warner Bros. 25797
- Producer: Marley Marl

MC Shan chronology
Down by Law (1987)	Born to Be Wild (1988)	Play It Again, Shan (1990)

Born to Be Wild is the second album released by Juice Crew member and East Coast rapper MC Shan.

With the production work of Marley Marl, MC Shan directly attacked Boogie Down Productions with "Juice Crew Law".

== Track listing ==
- All tracks produced by Marley Marl
1. "I Pioneered This"
2. "Give Me My Freedom"
3. "So Def"
4. "Back To The Basics"
5. "Go For Yours ('Cause I'm Gonna Get Mine)"
6. "Born To Be Wild"
7. "She's Gone"
8. "Juice Crew Law (Boogie Down Productions Diss)"
9. "Words Of A Freestyle"
10. "They Used To Do It Out In The Park"
11. "Never Rock A Party"
