= Never Grow Old (disambiguation) =

"Never Grow Old" is a gospel song.

Never Grow Old may also refer to:

- Never Grow Old, a 1994 album by Anne Hills with Cindy Mangsen
- Never Grow Old, a 1964 album by Toots and the Maytals
- "Never Grow Old", a track on the 2000 album On the Turntable 2 by Biz Markie
- "Never Grow Old", a song from the 2001 album Wake Up and Smell the Coffee by The Cranberries
- Never Grow Old (film), a 2019 film
