= Now, That's More Like It =

Studio album by Craig G
- Released: March 19, 1991
- Recorded: 1990–1991
- Studio: House of Hits (Chestnut Ridge, NY)
- Genre: Hip hop
- Length: 61:32
- Label: Atlantic
- Producer: Marley Marl (also exec.); Salaam Remi (co.); Craig G (co.)

Craig G chronology
The Kingpin (1989)	Now, That's More Like It (1991)	This Is Now!!! (2003)

Professional ratings
Review scores
Source	Rating
AllMusic	2/5 stars
MusicHound R&B: The Essential Album Guide	3.5/5 stars
RapReviews	6/10

Now, That's More Like It is the second studio album by American rapper Craig G. It was released on March 19, 1991, via Atlantic Records. The album peaked at No. 97 on the Top R&B/Hip-Hop Albums and its single "U-R-Not the 1" peaked at No. 16 on the Hot Rap Songs.

== Track listing ==
No.	Title	Producer(s)	Length
1.	"Intro"	Marley Marl; Craig G (co.)	0:43
2.	"What You're Used To"	Marley Marl; Salaam Remi (co.)	3:57
3.	"Girl Fever" (featuring the Flex)	Marley Marl; Craig G (co.)	3:44
4.	"Take the Bait"	Marley Marl; Craig G (co.)	3:38
5.	"Somem to Swing To"	Marley Marl; Craig G (co.)	3:28
6.	"I Want to Be in Luv" (featuring the Flex)	Marley Marl; Craig G (co.)	5:02
7.	"Give It to Me" (featuring Masta Ace)	Marley Marl; Craig G (co.)	4:34
8.	"Intro II"	Marley Marl; Craig G (co.)	0:24
9.	"Ripped to Streads"	Marley Marl; Craig G (co.)	2:00
10.	"Ummm!!!!"	Marley Marl; Craig G (co.)	3:27
11.	"Smoothing Out the Rough Spots"	Marley Marl; Craig G (co.)	3:16
12.	"Feel Ya Way"	Marley Marl; Salaam Remi (co.)	4:48
13.	"No Favors"	Marley Marl	4:34
14.	"Word Association"	Marley Marl; Craig G (co.)	3:34
15.	"U-R-Not the 1" (featuring the Flex)	Marley Marl; Craig G (co.)	3:52
16.	"Swiftness"
17.	"Live Off the Top"
18.	"Going for the Throat"
Total length:			1:01:32

== Personnel ==
- Craig Curry - main performer, co-producer (tracks: 1, 3–11, 14–15)
- Marlon Lu'ree Williams - executive producer, producer
- Salaam Remi - co-producer (tracks: 2, 12), re-mixing (track 13)
- Frank Heller - mixing
- DJ Clash - recording
- Howie Weinberg - mastering
- Francesca Spero - executive producer
- Darren Lighty - keyboards, programming, additional vocals
- Cliff Lighty - additional vocals
- Eric Williams - additional vocals
- Glen E. Friedman - photography

== Charts ==
Chart (1991)	Peak position
US Top R&B/Hip-Hop Albums (Billboard)	97
