= Craig G =

American rapper (born 1973)

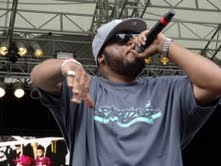
- Craig G performing in 2013

Background information
- Born: Craig Curry; March 24, 1973 (age 53)
- Origin: Queens, New York City, U.S.
- Genre: Hip-hop
- Years active: 1985–present
- Labels: Cold Chillin'; Atlantic; D&D; Soulspazm
- Formerly of: Juice Crew

Craig Curry (born March 24, 1973), better known by his stage name Craig G, is an American rapper. He is perhaps best known as one of the members of hip-hop producer Marley Marl's Cold Chillin' Records group Juice Crew.

He recorded the single "Shout Rap" with Marley Marl in 1985 at 12 years old and in 1988 recorded "The Symphony" with Juice Crew described by Allmusic as "a landmark moment in the evolution of hardcore rap". He was then signed by Atlantic Records who released two albums, in 1989 and 1991, with little promotion After his experience with Atlantic his career went quiet for much of the 1990s although later in the decade he regained popularity with underground rap fans. He released another album in 2003 on D&D Records This Is Now!!! featuring collaborations with Marley Marl, DJ Premier and Da Beatminerz.

== Career ==
Craig G was a leading freestyle battle rapper memorably battling Supernatural on several occasions, and in the early 2000s wrote and coordinated the battle verses used by Eminem and his opponents in the film 8 Mile. The next year he wrote the character Dangerous' lyrics in 50 Cent's feature film Get Rich or Die Tryin'. His battle with fellow battle rapper Supernatural was a subject of the 2005 documentary Freestyle: The Art of Rhyme.

In 2008, he was part of a reunited Juice Crew performing at the A3C Hip Hop Festival in Atlanta.

In 2012 he released his fourth solo album Ramblings Of An Angry Old Man. He was recording an as yet to be titled E.P. With Da Beatminerz Craig G dropped his fifth LP titled I Rap & Go Home on June 3, 2016. He recently leaked music from the project online Craig G new project the fragile ego will release September 4, 2020 Craig G will release a new album titled “The World Is Cooked” November 1st 2024

== Discography ==
=== Albums ===
==== Studio albums ====
List of studio albums, with selected chart positions
Title	Album details	Peak chart positions
Title	Album details	US R&B /HH
The Kingpin	Released: October 24, 1989; Label: Atlantic; Formats: CD, LP, cassette, digital download	—
Now, That's More Like It	Released: March 19, 1991; Label: Atlantic; Format: CD, cassette, digital download	97
This Is Now!!!	Released: May 20, 2003; Label: D&D Records; Format: CD, LP, digital download	99
Ramblings of an Angry Old Man	Released: October 30, 2012; Label: Soulspazm; Format: CD, LP, digital download	
I Rap and Go Home	Released: June 3, 2016; Label: Soulspazm; Format: LP, digital download	—
Lost Chronicles (with The Grinda & T-Leada)	Released: August 8, 2019; Label: D3G Ent.; Format: LP, digital download	—
Can't Stop the Funk Volume 1 (with KeemBeats)	Released: December 27, 2019; Label: Boogie Shack Music Group.; Format: Digital download	—
The World Is Cooked (Featuring Chuck D, KRS-One, B-Real, DV Alias Khrist, Chubb Rock & Freeway)	Released: November 1, 2024; Label: Soulspazm; Format: Digital download; Producer: The Manorail; Mix Engineer: Kjetil "Harlekin" Hatletveit; Mastering Engineer: Mat Leffler-Schulman	—
"—" denotes a recording that did not chart or was not released in that territory.

==== Mixtapes ====
List of mixtapes, with year released
Title	Mixtape details
This Is Now! Official Bootleg Mixtape (with DJ Evil Dee)	Released: 2003; Label: MasterTapes

==== Group albums ====
List of group albums
Title	Album details
Climate Control (as part of Silent Majority)	Released: June 27, 2006; Label: CurryPack Records; Format: CD

==== Collaborative albums ====
List of collaborative albums
Title	Album details
Operation Take Hip Hop Back (with Marley Marl)	Released: June 17, 2008; Label: Good Hands/Traffic Entertainment Group; Format: CD, LP, digital download

=== EPs ===
List of extended plays
Title	Details
The Legacy (with DJ Koss)	Released: January 28, 2013; Label: Reaaal Talk Records; Formats: LP, digital download
The WZA Presents OG'S: Original Grown Shit (with The WZA & Egreen)	Released: March 29, 2019; Label: Skill To Deal Records; Formatos: LP, digital download
Striketeam (with Mr. Cheeks)	Released: May 10, 2019; Label: WunderTwinz; Formats: Digital download
Limelight	Released: July 30, 2020; Label: Soulspazm; Formats: Digital download
The Fragile Ego	Released: September 4, 2020; Label: Soulspazm; Formats: Digital download
The World According to You (with Shawneci Icecold)	Released: December 30, 2020; Label: Zachary Raskin; Formats: Digital download
The Pen Is Mightier (with BigBob)	Released: January 18, 2021; Label: Elite Sound International; Formats: CD, digital download
The Assignment (with Nivek Bogeezi & Tone Spliff)	Released: April 16, 2021; Label: Mind Write Music; Formats: CD, digital download

=== Singles ===
==== As lead artist ====
List of singles, showing year released and album name
Title	Year	Peak chart positions	Album
Title	Year	US Rap	Album
"Transformer" (Note: Published as "M.C. Craig "G"")	1985	—	Street Sounds Electro 10
"Shout"	1985	—	Non-album single
"Turn This House Into a Home"	1989	—	The Kingpin
"Shootin' The Gift"	1990	—	The Kingpin
"U-R Not The 1"	1991	16	Now, That's More Like It
"Sing-A-Long/Welcome 2 The Game"	1998	—	Non-album single
"Cash Money" (with Domination Statuz)	1999	—	Non-album single
"Depopulator/The Freestyle"	1999	—	Non-album single
"Say What You Want/The Executioner Song"	2002	—	This Is Now!!!
"Let's Get Up" (with Marley Marl)	2003	—	This Is Now!!!
"Stomped/Make You Say Yes"	2003	—	This Is Now!!!
"Made the Change/Deep Down"	2008	—	Operation Take Hip Hop Back
"—" denotes a recording that did not chart or was not released in that territory.

=== Guest appearances ===
Year	Song	Featured artist(s)	Album
1988	"Droppin' Science"	Marley Marl	In Control, Volume 1
1988	"The Symphony"	Marley Marl, Masta Ace, Kool G Rap, Big Daddy Kane	In Control, Volume 1
1988	"Duck Alert"	Marley Marl	In Control, Volume 1
1989	"Gotta Get Paid"	Roxanne Shanté	Bad Sister
1991	"The Symphony Pt. 2"	Marley Marl, Daddy Shane, Masta Ace, Kool G Rap, Big Daddy Kane	In Control Volume II (For Your Steering Pleasure)
1994	"Just When You Thought It Was Over (Intro)"	Gravediggaz, Biz Markie, Brother Rich, King Ice, I-Roc, Don McKenzie, Ethan Ryman, Michael Preston, Tim Wright, Dave Warner, Stephanie Jackson, Chino Q, Mike G, Joyce, Robert Robinson, Mr. Sime	6 Feet Deep
1994	"Rest In Peace (Outro)"	Gravediggaz, Biz Markie, Brother Rich, King Ice, I-Roc, Don McKenzie, Ethan Ryman, Michael Preston, Tim Wright, Dave Warner, Stephanie Jackson, Chino Q, Mike G, Joyce, Robert Robinson, Mr. Sime	6 Feet Deep
1996	"The Cypher: Part 3"	Frankie Cutlass, Big Daddy Kane, Biz Markie, Roxanne Shanté	Politics & Bullshit
1998	"Intense"	Tommy Tee	Bonds, Beats & Beliefs
2000	"That's My World"	The Creators	The Weight
2000	"We Break Bread"	Chaos, Littles, Lord Black	Nas & Ill Will Records Presents QB's Finest
2001	"Keep Doing U"	Voice	Lake Ent. Presents: 41st Side
2007	"Offensive Lineup"	Snowgoons	German Lugers
2007	"Talk Cheap"	Tommy Tee	No Studio No Time
2007	"Brother On The Run"	O.S.T.R.	HollyŁódź
2009	"Lyrics?"	Sadat X	Brand New Bein'
2009	"Smallest Violin"	Sadat X, Jak D	Brand New Bein'
2010	"Daad bij het Woord / The Power of Speech"	Jerome XL, Kayaman	De Laatste Dag
2011	"Mann For Min Hatt"	Gatas Parlament	Dette Forandrer Alt
2015	"Ain't Nothing Funny"	Sadat X, Skyzoo	Never Left
2015	"The Kings Sent For Me (Samurydas Remix)"	Canibus, Bronze Nazareth, Kurupt, Raekwon	Time Flys, Life Dies...Phoenix Rise
2016	"MC Voltron"	Kool Keith	Feature Magnetic
2017	"Real NY City"	Neek the Exotic	The Neek The Exotic Experience
2018	”Duże Miasto”	Gorzki ft.Stanislaw Soyka, Jerome XL, Teka	Kontrawersja
2022	"Summertime"	Specifik	The Triple3 Effect
2022	"Get Em"	Specifik	Get Em 7"
2024	"Take Command"	Pushing Buttons	Full Level
