= On the Turntable =

Studio album by Biz Markie
- Released: August 25, 1998
- Recorded: 1998
- Genre: Hip hop
- Length: 48:34
- Label: P-Vine
- Producer: Biz Markie

Biz Markie chronology
| Biz's Baddest Beats (1994) | On the Turntable (1998) | On the Turntable 2 (2000) |

On the Turntable is a mix album released by Biz Markie. A follow-up was released in 2000, titled On the Turntable 2.

== Track listing ==
1. "My Automobile"- 2:04
2. "Which Way"- 1:17
3. "I Like It"- 1:00
4. "L.A. Jazz Song"- :46
5. "I'll Play the Blues for You"- 1:58
6. "The 24 Carat Black Theme"- :54
7. "Skin Valley Serenade"- :57
8. "Nasty Soul"- 2:23
9. "Ghetto: Misfortune's Wealth"- 1:20
10. "I'll Never Grow Old"- 2:31
11. "Do Me"- 1:49
12. "Memphis B.K."- 1:49
13. "I'll Take You There"- 2:38
14. "Mr. Big Stuff"- 2:02
15. "Mama's Gone"- 3:09
16. "Saginaw County Line"- 1:50
17. "Do the Funky Penguin, Pt. 2"- 4:23
18. "I Don't See Me in Your Eyes Anymore"- 2:38
19. "Sister Sanctified"- 2:28
20. "All We Need Is Understanding"- 2:23
21. "Don't Send Me an Invitation"- 2:22
22. "Tramp"- 3:23
23. "Aquarius"- :52
24. "Free Your Mind"- 2:31
