= Hits U Missed Vol. 2 =

Compilation album by Masta Ace
- Released: August 25, 2005
- Recorded: 2001–2004
- Genre: Hip Hop
- Label: M3 Records

Masta Ace chronology
Hits U Missed (2004)	Hits U Missed Vol. 2 (2005)	Grand Masta: The Remix & Rarity Collection (2006)

Hits U Missed Vol. 2 is a compilation album from hip hop artist Masta Ace. Unlike the first volume, Hits U Missed, which featured all Ace singles, this installment is composed of collaborations and mixtape tracks featuring Ace.

== Track listing ==
1. "Survival" Koolade featuring Masta Ace
  - Originally released on the "Survival" single (2004, ABB Records)
2. "What Am I?" DJ JS-1 featuring Masta Ace
  - Originally released on DJ JS-1's Ground Control (2003, Yosumi Records)
3. "Gimme Gimme Gimme" J-Zone featuring Masta Ace
  - Originally released on J-Zone's $ick of Being Rich (2003, Fat Beats)
4. "What Is It" Tommy Tee featuring Masta Ace
  - From Midnight Club II video game (2003)
5. "Out Da Box" Tony Touch featuring Pete Rock, Large Professor and Masta Ace
  - Originally released on Tony Touch's The Piece Maker 2 (2004, Landspeed Records)
6. "Again" DJ Serious featuring Masta Ace
  - Originally released on the "Again" single (2004, Audio Research)
7. "Figure 8" UK's Finest & Masta Ace
8. "The Call" Code Red featuring Masta Ace
  - Originally released on Code Red's Since Forever Til Forever (2002, 502 Headz Records)
9. "Family 1st" Punchline featuring Apocalypse & Masta Ace
  - Originally released on the "Family 1st" single (2003, Get Large Records)
10. "Boulevard Connection" Edo G, Common and Masta Ace
  - Originally released on the "CPH Claimin' Respect #2" single (2004, Boulevard Connection Records)
11. "We Get It Done" Masta Ace, Strick and Joe Buddah
12. "Get Large" Tribeca featuring Lord Tariq, Mr. Complex & Masta Ace
  - Originally released on the "Get Large" single (2003, Major League Records)
13. "Who Killed Hip Hop" Shams the Professor featuring Masta Ace
