= Grand Upright Music, Ltd. v. Warner Bros. Records Inc. =

US copyright infringement court decision

Grand Upright Music, Ltd v. Warner Bros. Records Inc.
- Court: United States District Court for the Southern District of New York
- Full case name: Grand Upright Music Limited v. Warner Bros. Records Inc., WEA International Inc., Marcel Hall, professionally known as Biz Markie, Biz Markie Productions Inc., Cool V Productions Inc., Cold Chillin' Records Inc., Biz Markie Music Inc., Cold Chillin' Music Publishing Inc., Tyrone Williams, and Benny Medina
- Decided: December 17, 1991
- Citations: 780 F. Supp. 182, 1992 Copr.L.Dec. (CCH) ¶ 26,878, 22 U.S.P.Q.2d 1556, 1991 U.S. Dist. LEXIS 18276

Holding
- That the Defendants had tried to secure a license from plaintiff prior to sampling its copyrighted song helped establish that their copyright infringement was knowing and intentional and that plaintiff was the valid copyright holder. Preliminary injunction granted.

Court membership
- Judge sitting: Kevin Thomas Duffy

Laws applied
- Copyright Act of 1976 (not cited)

Grand Upright Music, Ltd v. Warner Bros. Records Inc., 780 F. Supp. 182 (S.D.N.Y. 1991), was a copyright case heard by the United States District Court for the Southern District of New York. Songwriter Gilbert O'Sullivan sued rapper Biz Markie after Markie sampled O'Sullivan's song "Alone Again (Naturally)". The court ruled that sampling without permission constitutes copyright infringement. The judgment changed the hip hop music industry, requiring that any future music sampling be approved by the original copyright owners.

== Case ==
Rapper Biz Markie had sampled a portion of the song "Alone Again (Naturally)" by singer-songwriter Gilbert O'Sullivan in the track "Alone Again" from Markie's third album, I Need a Haircut. Markie and his production and recording companies were listed as co-defendants with Warner Bros. in the subsequent lawsuit.

Judge Kevin Thomas Duffy granted an injunction against the defendant, Warner Bros. Records, despite Warner Bros.' claim that Grand Upright did not own a valid copyright in the sampled song. Warner Bros. denied that Grand Upright owned the copyright to the song, though Grand Upright produced documentation that O'Sullivan had transferred title to them, and O'Sullivan himself testified to that regard. It also appears that the defendants unsuccessfully urged the court to take note of how common unapproved sampling was in the industry, because the court noted that "the defendants...would have this court believe that stealing is rampant in the music business and, for that reason, their conduct here should be excused."

The decision received some criticism for stating that "the most persuasive evidence that the copyrights are valid and owned by the plaintiff" was that Warner Bros. had previously attempted to obtain permission to use the song. However, this would not legally establish that Grand Upright was in fact the owner, but only that Warner Bros. believed that the song was copyrighted by someone, which would make their infringement knowing and willful. As Grand Upright had provided evidence that specifically established the copyright was theirs, the ruling did not hinge on this point, however.

The court wrote that "it is clear that the defendants knew that they were violating the plaintiff's rights as well as the rights of others. Their only aim was to sell thousands upon thousands of records. This callous disregard for the law and for the rights of others requires not only the preliminary injunction sought by the plaintiff but also sterner measures." The judge referred the matter to a United States Attorney for criminal prosecution, though no criminal charges were filed.

Judge Duffy has been accused of bias in admonishing the defense and referring the defense for criminal prosecution. Such criticism points out that Duffy's written opinion begins with one of the biblical ten commandments, "Thou shalt not steal." According to The Copyright Infringement Project of UCLA Law and Columbia Law School, Judge Duffy's opinion in Grand Upright v. Warner demonstrates "an iffy understanding on the part of this judge of the facts and issues before him in this case."

== Impact on music ==
The court case had a major effect on hip hop music. Sample clearance fees prohibited the use of more than one or two samples for most recordings, with some mechanical rights holders demanding up to 100% of royalties. As each sample had to be cleared to avoid legal action, records such as those produced by the Bomb Squad for Public Enemy, which use dozens of samples, became prohibitively expensive to produce. According to Pitchfork, "Overnight it became forbiddingly difficult and expensive to incorporate even a handful of samples into a new beat ... Producers scaled back their creations, often augmenting one choice groove with a bevy of instrumental embellishments."

As a result, interpolation (replaying the requested sample using new instrumentalists, using the newly recorded version and simply paying the songwriters—and not the artist or the label—for use of the composition) became prevalent in the industry, especially in the work of Dr. Dre. As early as 1989, Dr. Dre's production was styled around fewer samples per track, studio instrumentation, and sampling artists such as Parliament-Funkadelic who were amenable to having their music sampled.

"Alone Again" is not available on current releases of Markie's I Need a Haircut album. His next album was entitled All Samples Cleared!

== See also ==
- Collage#Legal issues
- Sound collage
