= Hits U Missed =

Compilation album by Masta Ace
- Released: January 29, 2004
- Recorded: 1996–2000
- Genre: Hip hop
- Label: M3 Records

Masta Ace chronology
| The Best of Cold Chillin: Masta Ace (2001) | Hits U Missed (2004) | Hits U Missed Vol. 2 (2005) |

Hits U Missed is a 2004 compilation album from hip hop artist Masta Ace, released through his self-owned M3 record label. The compilation features a number of singles released during his MIA period between 1996 and 2000, as well as a few B-side songs from past singles.

== Track listing ==
1. "Conflict" Featuring Guru
  - Originally released on the "Conflict" single (2000, Mona Records)
2. "Top 10 List"
  - Originally released on the "Turn it Up" single (1996, Delicious Vinyl Records)
3. "Ghetto Like"
  - Originally released on the "Ghetto Like" single (2000, Fat Beats)
4. "Last Bref"
  - Originally released on the "Brooklyn Blocks" single (2000, Duck Down Records)
5. "Observations" Featuring Apocalypse
  - Originally released on the Prime Cuts compilation (2000, Delicious Vinyl Records)
6. "Hellbound" Featuring Eminem and J-Black
  - Originally released on the Game Over compilation (2000, Yosumi Records)
7. "The Outcome"
  - Originally released on the "Ghetto Like" single (2000, Fat Beats)
8. "Splash"
  - Originally released on the Hip Hop 101 compilation (2000, Tommy Boy Records)
9. "Cars" Featuring Spunk Bigga
  - Originally released on the "Cars" single (1998, Tape Kingz/INC Records)
10. "Rap 2K1"
  - Originally released on the Game Over II compilation (2001, JCOR Records)
11. "Brooklyn Blocks" Featuring Buckshot
  - Originally released on the "Brooklyn Blocks" single (2000, Duck Down Records)
12. "Spread it Out"
  - Originally released on the Game Over compilation (2000, Yosumi Records)
13. "NY Confidential"
  - Originally released on the "NY Confidential" single (1999, Replay Records)
14. "Ya Hardcore"
  - Originally released on the Sittin' on Chrome EP (1995, Delicious Vinyl Records)
15. "Maintain" Featuring Lord Digga
  - Originally released on the Sittin' on Chrome EP (1995, Delicious Vinyl Records)
