= Feature Magnetic =

Studio album by Kool Keith
- Released: September 16, 2016
- Genre: Hip-hop
- Length: 42:48
- Label: Mello Music Group
- Producer: Michael Tolle (exec.); Kool Keith (also exec.); Futurewave; Giz; Ocean Ave Records; Ol Man 80zz

Kool Keith chronology
A Couple of Slices (2015)	Feature Magnetic (2016)	Moosebumps: An Exploration Into Modern Day Horripilation (2018)

Professional ratings
Aggregate scores
Source	Rating
Metacritic	75/100
Review scores
Source	Rating
AllMusic	3.5/5 stars
Exclaim!	5/10 stars
HipHopDX	3.8/5 stars
Pitchfork	7.5/10 stars

Feature Magnetic is the fourteenth solo studio album by American recording artist Kool Keith. It was released on September 16, 2016, via Mello Music Group and produced entirely by Keith under his alias Number One Producer, except for three tracks produced by Futurewave, Giz, Ocean Ave Records, and Ol Man 80zz. The project featured guest appearances from B.a.R.S. Murre, Craig G, Dirt Nasty, Ed O.G., Freddie Foxxx, Godfather Don, Mac Mall, MF Doom, Necro, Psycho Les, Ras Kass, Sadat X, and Slug.

== Track listing ==
No.	Title	Producer(s)	Length
1.	"Intro"	Number One Producer	Intro
2.	"Stratocaster" (featuring Godfather Don)	Number One Producer	3:07
3.	"MC Voltron" (featuring Craig G)	Number One Producer	2:55
4.	"Super Hero" (featuring MF Doom)	Number One Producer	3:10
5.	"World Wide Lamper" (featuring B.a.R.S Murre & Dirt Nasty)	Number One Producer	4:00
6.	"Bragging Rights" (featuring Psycho Les)	Number One Producer	3:06
7.	"Girl Grab" (featuring Necro)	Number One Producer	3:13
8.	"Bonneville" (featuring Mac Mall)	Ocean Ave Records	2:43
9.	"Tired" (featuring Ed O.G.)	Ol Man 80zz; Futurewave	3:18
10.	"Cold Freezer" (featuring Bumpy Knuckles)	Number One Producer	2:59
11.	"Peer Pressure" (featuring Slug)	Number One Producer	3:34
12.	"Life" (featuring Sadat X)	Giz	3:31
13.	"Writers" (featuring Ras Kass)	Number One Producer	3:24
14.	"Cheesecake" (Bonus track)	Number One Producer	3:09
15.	"Super Hero (L'Orange Remix)" (featuring MF Doom)	L'Orange	4:28
Total length:			42:48

== Personnel ==
- Keith Matthew Thornton – vocals, executive producer, producer (tracks: 1–7, 10–11, 13–14)
- Michael Tolle – executive producer
- Steve Rossiter – mastering
- Christopher Parker – photography
- Sarah Dalton – design
- Craig Curry – vocals (track 3)
- Daniel Dumile – vocals (tracks: 4, 15)
- Derek Murphy – vocals (track 12)
- Edward Anderson – vocals (track 9)
- Jamal Rocker – vocals (track 8)
- James Campbell – vocals (track 10)
- John Austin IV – vocals (track 13)
- Lester Fernandez – vocals (track 6)
- Rodney Chapman – vocals (track 2)
- Ron Raphael Braunstein – vocals (track 7)
- Sean Michael Daley – vocals (track 11)
- Simon Rex Cutright – vocals (track 5)
- Marc Santo – photography
- Laci Taylor – model
- Jeremiah Thornton – model
