= Make the Music with Your Mouth, Biz =

EP by Biz Markie
- Released: 1986
- Recorded: 1986
- Genre: Hip hop
- Label: Prism
- Producer: Marley Marl

Make the Music with Your Mouth, Biz is an EP by Biz Markie. It was released in 1986 on Prism Records on 12" and cassette and was produced by Marley Marl. An expanded edition was released on CD and 2xLP in 2006 on Cold Chillin' Records/Traffic Entertainment Group.

== Track listing ==
1. "Make the Music with Your Mouth, Biz" - 5:15
2. "The Biz Dance" - 3:40
3. "They're Coming to Take Me Away (Ha Haa)" - 3:26
4. "A One Two" - 2:20
5. "The Biz Dance" (dub) - 3:41
6. "Make the Music with Your Mouth, Biz" (instrumental) - 4:48

== 2006 Reissue Track Listing ==
1. "Make the Music with Your Mouth, Biz" - 5:15
2. "The Biz Dance" - 3:40
3. "They're Coming to Take Me Away (Ha Haa)" - 3:26
4. "A One Two" - 2:20
5. "The Biz Dance" (dub) - 3:41
6. "Make the Music with Your Mouth, Biz" (instrumental) - 4:48
7. "Biz Beat" - 4:21
8. "Beat Box (Live)" - 2:38
9. "Oh Girl (Live)" - 1:49
10. "Music with Your Mouth, Biz (Live)" - 4:41
11. "Nobody Beats the Biz (Live)" - 4:17
12. "Protection (Live)" - 5:38
13. "XXX-Mas Freestyle (Live)" - 1:28
14. "The Biz Dance (Live)" - 1:55
