= Street Sounds Electro 10 =

Compilation album by various artists
- Released: 1985
- Genre: Electro music, old school hip hop
- Label: StreetSounds

Street Sounds Electro 10 is the tenth compilation album in a series and was released 1985 on the StreetSounds label. The album was released on LP and cassette and contains eight electro music and old-school hip hop tracks mixed by Herbie Laidley.

== Track listing ==
Side one
No.	Title	Artist	Length
1.	"Johnny The Fox"	Tricky Tee	-:--
2.	"Bite This"	Roxanne Shanté	-:--
3.	"Knights Of The Turntables"	Dynamic Duo featuring Shaquan	-:--
4.	"Star Raid"	19th Fleet	-:--

Side two
No.	Title	Artist	Length
1.	"Together Forever"	Run-D.M.C	-:--
2.	"Transformer"	M.C. Craig "G"	-:--
3.	"Two, Three, Break"	D.J. Born Supreme Allah	-:--
4.	"Don't Stop The Rock"	Freestyle	-:--
