= Down by Law (MC Shan album) =

Down By Law

Studio album by MC Shan
- Released: August 8, 1987
- Recorded: 1986–1987
- Genre: East Coast hip hop
- Length: 45:03
- Labels: Cold Chillin'; Warner Bros. 25676
- Producer: Marley Marl

MC Shan chronology
Down By Law (1987)	Born to be Wild (1988)

Professional ratings
Review scores
Source	Rating
Allmusic	3/5 stars

Down by Law is the debut album by the East Coast hip-hop artist MC Shan. Released at the height of the Bridge Wars, a feud that erupted between Boogie Down Productions and the Juice Crew, responding to the Queensbridge anthem "The Bridge", this album contains the diss track "Kill That Noise" in response to Boogie Down Productions' "South Bronx" (as well as an edit of "The Bridge").

== Production and releases ==
The album was produced by Marley Marl and was distributed by Cold Chillin' Records independently (the label's very first LP release, catalog #CCLP-500), until a distribution deal was struck with Warner Bros. Records in 1988, then the album was reissued with slight sample edits. It was the only Cold Chillin'/Warner Bros. album that was never initially released on CD by its distributor. The album was not released on that format until 1995, long after the 5-year distribution deal with Warner Bros. Records ended. By this time, Cold Chillin' distributed its material independently, mostly from its back catalog. This CD pressing would only be available for a limited time and went out of print for a few years. It was then re-released in 2001 as MC Shan: the Best of Cold Chillin', which featured all the tracks from Down by Law (except "Another One to Get Jealous Of") with a few additional non-album tracks. This version is now out of print as well. In 2007, it was re-released again by its new owner, Traffic Entertainment, in expanded form as a double-disc set with extended tracks, as well as bonus tracks.

== Reception ==
In a contemporary review, The Washington Post stated that the album's "sound is not particularly innovative, Shan creates a wiry visceral groove on such tracks as "Kill That Noise" and "Living in the World of Hip Hop"" In 1998, it was listed in The Source's 100 Best Rap Albums.

== Track listing ==
- All tracks produced by Marley Marl

#	Title	Performer(s)
1	"Jane, Stop This Crazy Thing!"	MC Shan
2	"Project Ho"	MC Shan
3	"The Bridge"	MC Shan
4	"Kill That Noise"	MC Shan
5	"Down by Law"	MC Shan
6	"Left Me Lonely"	MC Shan; TJ Swan
7	"Another One to Get Jealous Of"	MC Shan
8	"MC Space"	MC Shan
9	"Living in the World of Hip-Hop"	MC Shan

== Chart positions ==
Chart (1987)	Peak position
Billboard Top R&B Albums	40
