= Lead Pipe (album) =

Studio album by Grand Daddy I.U.
- Released: June 21, 1994
- Recorded: 1993–1994
- Genre: Hip hop
- Length: 1:02:39
- Label: Cold Chillin'; Epic Street
- Producer: Fly Ty (exec.); "Kool Ass" Lenny (exec.); Kay Cee; Grand Daddy I.U.; Big Snow

Grand Daddy I.U. chronology
Smooth Assassin (1990)	Lead Pipe (1994)	Stick to the Script (2007)

Lead Pipe is the second studio album by American rapper Grand Daddy I.U. from Queens, New York. It was released on June 21, 1994, through Cold Chillin'/Epic Street. The entire album (with the exception of "Blast a New Asshole") was produced by Grand Daddy I.U. and Kay Cee.

Despite being released on a major label, the album was a commercial failure, only reaching number 88 on the Billboard Top R&B/Hip-Hop Albums. Following the album, Grand Daddy I.U. appeared on Big L's 1995 album, Lifestylez ov da Poor & Dangerous and then went on a 12-year hiatus before returning in 2007 with his third studio album, Stick to the Script.

== Track listing ==
All music is composed by Kay Cee and Grand Daddy I.U., except for track 8 composed by Big Snow.

No.	Title	Length
1.	"Represent"	4:04
2.	"As I Flow On"	4:52
3.	"We Got Da Gats"	3:31
4.	"I Can Do Dat"	4:06
5.	"Don't Stress Me"	4:28
6.	"Da Real Mack"	4:06
7.	"Boom Wha Dat"	4:50
8.	"Blast a New Asshole" (featuring Big Snow, Kid Capri & Taheim)	4:37
9.	"Slinging Bass"	4:26
10.	"Wet 'Em Up"	3:45
11.	"Dead Men Don't Talk"	2:35
12.	"Take It From Da Top"	3:07
13.	"Time to Die"	3:22
14.	"Low Key"	4:14
15.	"Shout Outs"	2:24
16.	"Represent" (The Grinch & Hill Remix)	4:12
Total length:		1:02:39

== Personnel ==
- Ayyub Cave – main artist, producer (tracks: 1–7, 9–16), mixing
- Anthony PapaMichael – bass, keyboards, strings, engineering, mixing
- Anton Pukshansky – bass, piano
- Richard Bush – keyboards
- Brett Miles – horns
- Vikki – backing vocals
- Earlando Arrington "Early B" Neil – backing vocals
- Kay Cee – scratches, producer (tracks: 1–7, 9–16), arranger, mixing
- Big Snow – producer (track 8)
- Robert Power – mixing
- Loren Wilson Hill – re-mixing (track 16)
- Wendell "The Grinch" Hanes – re-mixing (track 16)
- Tyrone "Fly Ty" Williams – executive producer
- Leonard Fichtelberg – executive producer

== Charts ==
Chart (1994)	Peak position
US Top R&B/Hip-Hop Albums (Billboard)	88
