= Grand Masta: The Remix & Rarity Collection =

Remix album by Masta Ace
- Released: September 12, 2006
- Recorded: 1992–2000
- Genre: Hip hop
- Label: Funky Chemist Recordings

Masta Ace chronology
Hits U Missed Vol. 2 (2005)	Grand Masta: The Remix & Rarity Collection (2006)

Grand Masta: The Remix & Rarity Collection is a 2006 compilation album by Masta Ace. The compilation features remixes of a number of Ace singles, including "Jeep Ass Niguh", "SlaughtaHouse", "Style Wars", "Saturday Nite Live", "Sittin' on Chrome" and "The I.N.C. Ride", as well as a few rare B-side tracks.

== Track listing ==
1. "Jeep Ass Niguh (Dusted Mix)"
2. "SlaughtaHouse (Murder Mix)"
3. "SlaughtaHouse (Death Mix)"
4. "Style Wars (Remix)"
5. "Saturday Nite Live (Horny Mix)"
6. "Saturday Nite Live (LA Jay Mix)"
7. "Sittin' on Chrome (Pitkin Ave Mix)"
8. "Sittin' on Chrome (Rockaway Ave Mix)"
9. "Ya Hardcore (Trip 2 Albee Sq)"
10. "The I.N.C. Ride (Radio Remix)"
11. "The I.N.C. Ride (No Ends Remix)"
12. "Turn it Up (Remix)"
13. "Top 10 List"
14. "Wake Me When I'm Dead" (Brand New Heavies featuring Masta Ace)
15. "Observations" Featuring Apocalypse
