= The Biz Never Sleeps =

Studio album by Biz Markie
- Released: October 10, 1989
- Recorded: March–July 1989
- Genre: Golden age hip hop
- Length: 49:02
- Label: Cold Chillin'; Warner Bros.
- Producer: Biz Markie; Cool V

Biz Markie chronology
Goin' Off (1988)	The Biz Never Sleeps (1989)	I Need a Haircut (1991)

Singles from The Biz Never Sleeps
- 1. "Just a Friend" Released: September 26, 1989; 2. "Spring Again" Released: 1990

"Just A Friend"
Biz Markie's "Just a Friend" from The Biz Never Sleeps

Professional ratings
Review scores
Source	Rating
Allmusic	4/5 stars

The Biz Never Sleeps is the second studio album by Biz Markie. It was released on October 10, 1989, on Cold Chillin'/Warner Bros. Records and was produced by Biz, his cousin Cool V on Cold Chillin' Records. The album proved to be a success, peaking at #66 on the Billboard 200 and #9 on the Top R&B/Hip-Hop Albums, as well as producing his most famous song and biggest hit "Just a Friend", which made it to #9 on the Billboard Hot 100 and #5 on the Hot Rap Singles. The album was certified gold by the RIAA on April 24, 1990.

"She's Not Just Another Woman (Monique)" samples 8th Day's song "She's Not Just Another Woman".

A video for the track "Spring Again" was released in the spring of 1990.

A 2006 Japanese issue includes song "A Thing Named Kim" as track 8.

Though out of print for many years, the album was reissued on LP and CD in 2012 by Traffic Entertainment Group.

The release has received praise both from critics as well as fellow musicians over the years, with "Just a Friend" attracting particular acclaim. The 2006 hip-hop centered memoir In the Arms of Baby Hop cited the album as one of the "immaculate tapes out by February and March of 1990" (another example being 3rd Bass's The Cactus LP) influencing many. The magazine Jet named the release one of their top 20 albums of the period in their January 15, 1990 edition.

== Track listing ==
1. "Dedication"- 4:02
2. "Check It Out"- 4:01
3. "The Dragon"- 4:08
4. "Spring Again"- 4:03
5. "Just a Friend"- 4:06
6. "She's Not Just Another Woman (Monique)"- 3:46
7. "Mudd Foot"- 4:16
8. "A Thing Named Kim"- 4:44
9. "Me vs. Me"- 4:47
10. "My Man Rich"- 3:44
11. "I Hear Music"- 3:01
12. "Biz In The Harmony"- 4:16
13. "Things Get a Little Easier"- 4:12

== Personnel ==
Contributors
Producers
Producer(s)	Biz Markie, DJ Cool V
Executive Producer(s)	Benny Medina
Performers
Lead vocals and rhyming	Biz Markie
Additional and background vocals	Mary Brown
Technicians
Mixing	DJ Cool V
Engineering	Doc Rodriguez, DJ Cool V, Paul C
Mastering	Carlton Batts
Photography	George DuBose
Design	George DuBose

== Charts ==
=== Weekly charts ===
Chart (1989)	Peak position
US Billboard 200	66
US Top R&B/Hip-Hop Albums (Billboard)	9

=== Year-end charts ===
Chart (1990)	Position
US Top R&B/Hip-Hop Albums (Billboard)	43

== Certifications ==
Region	Certification	Certified units/sales
United States (RIAA)	Gold	500,000^{^}
^{^} Shipments figures based on certification alone.

== See also ==
- Biz Markie discography
- Golden age hip hop
