= Juice Crew =

American hip-hop collective

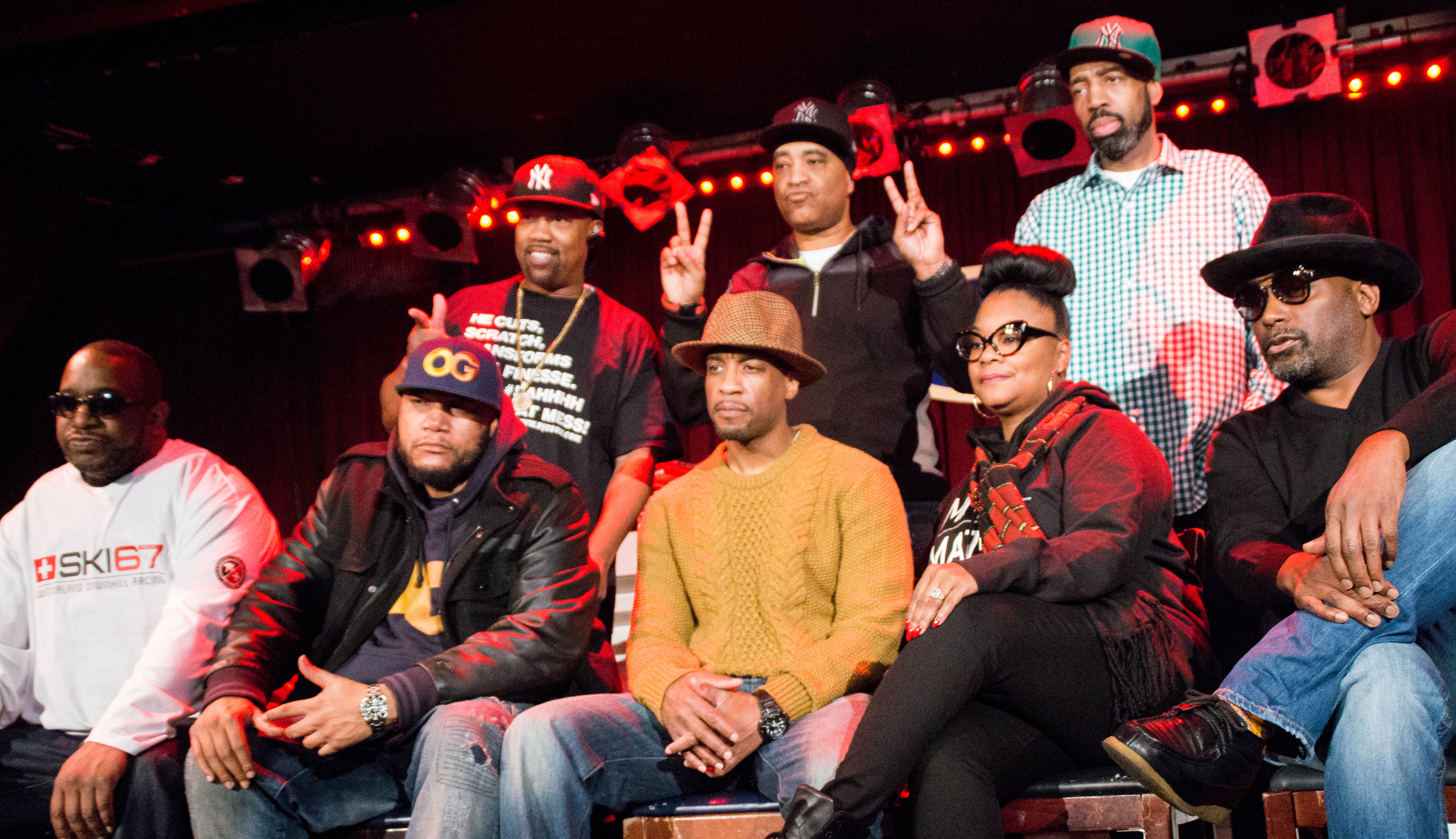
- Juice Crew, reunited in 2016

Background information
- Also known as: The Juice Crew All-Stars
- Origin: New York City, U.S.
- Genres: Hip-hop
- Years active: 1983–1991
- Label: Cold Chillin'
- Past members: Marley Marl; Roxanne Shante; MC Shan; Biz Markie (deceased); Big Daddy Kane; Mister Cee (deceased); Kool G Rap; Masta Ace; Craig G; Tragedy Khadafi; Grand Daddy I.U. (deceased); Mr. Magic (deceased); DJ Polo (deceased); DJ Cool V; DJ Fatal; DJ Chilly Q; MC Glamorous; MC Debbie Dee; TJ Swan (deceased)

The Juice Crew was an American hip-hop collective made up largely of Queensbridge, New York–based artists in the mid-to-late 1980s. Founded by radio DJ Mr. Magic, and housed by Tyrone Williams' record label Cold Chillin' Records, the Juice Crew helped introduce new School artists MC Shan, Big Daddy Kane, Biz Markie, Roxanne Shante, Masta Ace, Tragedy, Craig G and Kool G Rap. The crew produced many answer records and engaged with numerous "beefs" – primarily with rival radio jock Kool DJ Red Alert and the South Bronx's Boogie Down Productions, as well as the "posse cut", "The Symphony".

== History ==
=== Early years ===
Marley Marl started his career as Mr. Magic's sidekick and DJ on the influential radio show Rapp Attack, the first exclusively hip-hop music program to be aired on a major radio station, New York's WBLS-FM. The show was influential in launching the careers of the group's various artists. The crew derived its name from Mr. Magic's alias, "Sir Juice". Previously, Magic had created an "original" Juice Crew consisting of himself, record executive Sal Abbatiello, and artists Sweet Gee, DJ June Bug, and Kurtis Blow.

As a record producer, Marley Marl began the Juice Crew's long tradition of answer records with their first release, 1983's "Sucker DJ's (I Will Survive)" by Marley's then-girlfriend Dimples D.; a response to Run-D.M.C.'s "Sucker M.C.'s". Although this initial effort failed to provoke a reaction of any discernible magnitude, it foreshadowed the groups' ultimate path to success.

=== Roxanne Shante ===
A chance encounter in 1984 between Mr. Magic, Marley Marl, and manager Tyrone Williams, as well as 15-year-old rapper Roxanne Shante, resulted in their breakout hit "Roxanne's Revenge". A scathing attack on UTFO's "Roxanne, Roxanne", the song became so popular that it not only garnered a response from the original group (with the help of a young rapper claiming to be The Real Roxanne), but also inspired dozens of imitators in a series of records known as the Roxanne Wars.

=== MC Shan and dispute with KRS-One ===
In 1986, Marley produced his cousin MC Shan's second release "The Bridge"/"Beat Biter". "Beat Biter" included lyrics dissing local Queens superstar LL Cool J, who was allegedly stealing Marley's music. However, the true significance of the 12-inch release was not its headliner, but the B-side track, "The Bridge", which proved much more popular, finding not only considerable radio play but also the ire of Boogie Down Productions (BDP).

BDP, an upstart rap group from the South Bronx led by rapper KRS-One, took offense to MC Shan's lyrics, their contested interpretation being that Shan was claiming Queens was the birthplace of hip-hop, when in fact, it originated largely in the Bronx. Adding to the beef was an ongoing feud between Mr. Magic and his arch-rival Kool DJ Red Alert, who played a similar role in supporting Boogie Down Productions' budding career, involving Mr. Magic deriding their early efforts. BDP launched the first attack with "South Bronx", which was premiered live in concert after an MC Shan performance of "The Bridge". Shan and Marley responded with "Kill That Noise", released on MC Shan's 1987 debut Down By Law – the first full-length release from Tyrone Williams newly formed Cold Chillin' Records – calling out KRS-One's attention-grabbing methods. However, the battle was widely regarded as having been won by KRS-One and the BDP Crew, with the diss track "The Bridge Is Over". Nonetheless, the so-called "Bridge Wars" would be drawn out over a number of proxies.

=== Cold Chillin' and Juice Crew expansion ===
Cold Chillin' Records soon became home to most Juice Crew artists. The Juice Crew began to expand around this time, most notably with the inclusion of two high school friends from Brooklyn: rapper Big Daddy Kane and "human beatbox" Biz Markie. Biz previously collaborated with Shanté for 1986's "Def Fresh Crew" and found success with his Marley-produced debut single "Make the Music with Your Mouth, Biz", which also introduced Juice Crew singer TJ Swan. In February 1988, Biz's album Goin' Off was released by Cold Chillin', which had just signed a five-year distribution deal with Warner Bros. Records. By the following year, Biz would become a national celebrity with the hit single "Just A Friend" reaching the US Top Ten. Big Daddy Kane went on to become not only one of the biggest selling but also one of the most respected and influential rappers of his time. Kool G Rap, together with musical partner DJ Polo, was met with similar critical acclaim, albeit less commercial success. The other artists added to the Juice Crew/Cold Chillin' roster were Masta Ace and Queensbridge up-and-comers Tragedy the Intelligent Hoodlum, Craig G, and Glamorous; the latter being featured on Pop Art records before joining the Juice Crew as a member of the "Glamour Girls" and releasing their only single "Oh Veronica, Veronica" in 1985. Craig G also recorded a beatbox version. Glamorous is now Muslim, doing spoken word poetry, and has become a Crisis Chaplain. Her saying now is; "There is more to me than poetry".

=== Marley Marl solo album ===
In 1988, to showcase both his expanding crew and evolving musical productions, Marley Marl released the label–showcase In Control Volume 1. The fifth track on the album, The Symphony, with its sparse drum sample, simple piano melody and back-to-back roster of lyrical heavyweights (Masta Ace, Craig G, Kool G Rap and Big Daddy Kane) made an impression on hip-hop and is widely regarded as the quintessential "posse cut".

Marley Marl spent the early 1990s as a producer, including work with LL Cool J in 1990 on Mama Said Knock You Out. It would be the last year he would contribute to a Juice Crew member's album. The Juice Crew's, 1991 release In Control Volume II (For Your Steering Pleasure) featured appearances from LL Cool J and Chuck D but featured little of the original crew. Cold Chillin' Records struggled in the early 1990s and less successful acts like Masta Ace were dropped.

== Legacy ==
In the 1990s, The Intelligent Hoodlum (later known as Tragedy Khadafi), played a personal role in shaping the lyrics and imagery of Capone-N-Noreaga – most notably on their album The War Report – and his younger cousin Havoc of Mobb Deep.

In 1998 Nas was quoted in an interview saying:

Growing up in Queensbridge it was Marley Marl and The Juice Crew that gave rap niggas like myself hope that there was another life beyond our hood... He made us believe that although we came from those wild streets, we still had a chance to change our lives.

2000s Nas & Ill Will Records Presents QB's Finest sought to honor this heritage on the track "Da Bridge 2001" which featured an all-star update of MC Shan and Marley Marl's classic consisting of Tragedy, Mobb Deep, Capone, and Nas.

In 2007, the feud between the Juice Crew and Boogie Down Productions was officially laid to rest when Marley Marl and KRS-One released the collaborative album, Hip Hop Lives, a quasi-sequel record to Nas' Hip Hop Is Dead.

The Vapors, a biopic about the Juice Crew directed by Furqaan Clover and starring Cuba Gooding Jr. as Marley Marl and Keke Palmer as Roxanne Shanté, began production in February 2008. The movie is currently on hold due to cast issues. Roxanne Shanté's life story was depicted in the 2017 Netflix film, Roxanne Roxanne.
