= I Need a Haircut =

Studio album by Biz Markie
- Released: August 27, 1991
- Recorded: May 1990–May 1991
- Genre: Hip hop
- Length: 52:38
- Label: Cold Chillin'; Warner Bros. 26648
- Producer: Biz Markie

Biz Markie chronology
The Biz Never Sleeps (1989)	I Need a Haircut (1991)	All Samples Cleared! (1993)

Professional ratings
Review scores
Source	Rating
AllMusic	3/5 stars
Calgary Herald	C
Robert Christgau	(3-star Honorable Mention)
The Encyclopedia of Popular Music	3/5 stars
The Rolling Stone Album Guide	2.5/5 stars

I Need a Haircut is the third studio album by the American rapper Biz Markie. It was released on August 27, 1991, on Cold Chillin'/Warner Bros. Records, and was produced by Biz Markie. The album was a minor success, making it to #113 on the Billboard 200 and #44 on the Top R&B/Hip-Hop Albums.

== Sampling lawsuit ==
The album forever changed the hip-hop industry due to the album's 12th track, "Alone Again". Biz was served a lawsuit by Gilbert O'Sullivan because "Alone Again" contained an unauthorized sample from O'Sullivan's 1972 song, "Alone Again (Naturally)". The resulting case was Grand Upright Music, Ltd. v. Warner Bros. Records Inc., in which the court granted an injunction against the defendants to prevent further copyright infringement of the plaintiff's song by sampling and referred them for criminal prosecution. The judgment changed the hip hop music industry, requiring that any future music sampling be pre-approved by the original copyright owners to avoid a lawsuit. Biz would poke fun at his misfortunes, titling his next album All Samples Cleared!

After Cold Chillin' ended its deal with Warner, the album was re-pressed without the illegal track.

== Critical reception ==
Trouser Press called I Need a Haircut "a fairly diverting record that could have been suppressed on the basis of good taste." Billboard wrote that the "delivery here is rhythmically slack and mush-mouthed, and production values are skimpy." The Indianapolis Star wrote: "Markie wants his humor to have bite, but his jokes never go beyond intentionally singing off-key and a recurring I-told-you-so admonishment to ex-friends who never thought Markie would make it big." The Calgary Herald wrote that Markie is "entertainin' enough but after a while his one- dimensional thumping-as-music and five-minute listing of friends becomes dull."

== Track listing ==
1. "To My Boys" – 5:10
2. "Road Block" – 3:56
3. "Let Go My Eggo" – 3:54
4. "What Comes Around Goes Around" – 4:05
5. "Romeo and Juliet" – 3:42
6. "Toilet Stool Rap" – 2:34
7. "Busy Doing Nuthin’" – 3:53
8. "I Told You" – 3:55
9. "Buck Wild" – 4:31
10. "Kung Fu" – 5:00
11. "Take it from the Top" – 6:44
12. "Alone Again" – 2:54 (see Sampling lawsuit)
13. "On and On" – 2:38

== Charts ==
Chart (1991)	Peak position
US Billboard 200	113
US Top R&B/Hip-Hop Albums (Billboard)	44
