= On the Turntable 2 =

Studio album by Biz Markie
- Released: September 25, 2000
- Recorded: 2000
- Genre: Hip hop
- Label: Pony Canyon
- Producer: Biz Markie

Biz Markie chronology
On the Turntable (1998)	On the Turntable 2 (2000)	Greatest Hits (2002)

On the Turntable 2 is a second Mix album released by Biz Markie. It was the follow-up to 1998's On the Turntable.

== Track listing ==
1. "Intro"
2. "Watcha See Is Watcha Get"
3. "Play The Blues For You"
4. "Never Grow Old"
5. "Food Stamps"
6. "I Like It"
7. "Do The Push & Pull"
8. "Hip Hug Her"
9. "Take You There"
10. "No Name Bar"
11. "I Wanna Sang"
12. "Mr Big Stuff"
13. "Holy Ghost"
14. "Ike's Mood"
15. "I'm Afraid the Masquerade's Over"
16. "What a Man"
17. "Do the Funky Penguin"
18. "Hung Up On My Baby"
19. "Never Love a Man"
20. "It's Time For Me To Love You"
