= Weekend Warrior (album) =

Studio album by Biz Markie
- Released: November 18, 2003
- Recorded: 2003
- Genre: Hip hop
- Length: 59:20
- Label: Tommy Boy
- Producers: Biz Markie; J-Zone; Osinachi Nwaneri; Sorce; The 45 King; Kev Brown; Chucky Thompson

Biz Markie chronology
| Greatest Hits (2002) | Weekend Warrior (2003) |

Professional ratings
Review scores
| Source | Rating |
|---|---|
| AllMusic | 1.5/5 stars |
| The A.V. Club | favorable |
| Robert Christgau | (choice cut) |
| Entertainment Weekly | B |
| Exclaim! | mixed |
| The Guardian | 3/5 stars |
| Pitchfork Media | 6.4/10 |

Weekend Warrior is the fifth and final studio album by American hip hop musician Biz Markie. It was released on Tommy Boy Entertainment in 2003.

== Track listing ==
| No. | Title | Producer(s) | Length |
|---|---|---|---|
| 1. | "Intro" | Biz Markie | 0:28 |
| 2. | "Tear Shit Up" (featuring DJ Jazzy Jeff) | Biz Markie | 4:25 |
| 3. | "Chinese Food" | Biz Markie; J-Zone | 4:41 |
| 4. | "Let Me See U Bounce" (featuring Elephant Man) | Osinachi Nwaneri | 3:36 |
| 5. | "Like a Dream" (featuring Lil' Kal) | Osinachi Nwaneri | 3:50 |
| 6. | "Biz Clownin' (Interlude)" | Biz Markie | 0:52 |
| 7. | "Throw Back" | Sorce | 3:15 |
| 8. | "Friends" | Biz Markie | 3:46 |
| 9. | "Do Your Thang" (featuring P. Diddy) | BIz Markie | 3:45 |
| 10. | "Country (Interlude)" | Biz Markie | 1:03 |
| 11. | "Turn Back the Hands of Time" (featuring Lil' Kal) | The 45 King | 4:08 |
| 12. | "Games" | Kev Brown | 4:13 |
| 13. | "Not a Freak" (featuring Erick Sermon) | Osinachi Nwaneri | 4:00 |
| 14. | "Party To The Break-A-Day" | Chucky Thompson | 3:59 |
| 15. | "Beatbox (Interlude)" | Biz Markie | 0:32 |
| 16. | "For the DJ'z" (featuring Faison and Lil' Kal) | Osinachi Nwaneri | 4:15 |
| 17. | "Get Down" | Kev Brown | 4:20 |
| 18. | "Ei Ya" | Biz Markie; Osinachi Nwaneri | 4:12 |
