= Just a Friend =

Single by Biz Markie

from the album The Biz Never Sleeps
- Released: September 26, 1989
- Recorded: 1989
- Genre: Pop rap; comedy hip hop
- Length: 4:06
- Label: Cold Chillin'
- Songwriters: Marcel Hall, Kenneth Gamble, Leon Huff
- Producer: Marcel Hall

Biz Markie singles chronology
"Free Your Mind" (1988)	"Just a Friend" (1989)	"Intro" (1990)

Music video
- "Just a Friend" on YouTube

"Just a Friend"
Biz Markie's "Just a Friend" from The Biz Never Sleeps

"Just a Friend" is a song written, produced and performed by American hip hop artist Biz Markie. It was released in September 1989 as the lead single from his second album, The Biz Never Sleeps (1989). It is Markie's most successful single, reaching number nine on the US Billboard Hot 100 in 1990.

== Background ==
The song interpolates the 1968 song "(You) Got What I Need" recorded by Freddie Scott, whose basic chord and melody provided the base for the song's chorus. Markie's lyrics describe romantic frustration after pursuing a woman who is actually romantically involved with another man who she falsely claims is "just a friend." Due to the widespread popularity of the song along with its acclaim and its influence on pop culture (and Markie's failure to have another charting Hot 100 song), Biz was classified by VH1 as a one-hit wonder, and "Just a Friend" was ranked 81st on VH1's 100 Greatest One-Hit Wonders in 2000, and later as number 100 on VH1's 100 Greatest Songs of Hip Hop in 2008. Karma, a staff record producer for Cold Chillin' Records, told Vibe magazine in 2005 that he produced the single, but never received credit. The single was certified platinum on April 12, 1990. In 2021, it was ranked at No. 480 on Rolling Stone's "Top 500 Best Songs of All Time".

== Music video ==
The music video, directed by Lionel C. Martin, acts out the lyrics humorously and includes a scene of Biz Markie singing the chorus dressed as Mozart in 18th-century clothing with a powdered wig in a candlelit room while humorously pretending to play the piano.

== Legacy ==
In 1993, Akinyele's song I Luh Hur from his album Vagina Diner mentioned "Just a Friend".

In 2002, American R&B singer Mario released a reimagined cover of the song as his debut single. His version reached #4 on the Billboard Hot 100.

In 2006, American rock band Tally Hall recorded a cover of "Just a Friend", later releasing it on streaming platforms in 2019. The band had often performed the song as their closer in live sets, especially during their earlier years.

In 2007, Chris Rock and Kerry Washington sang "Just A Friend" in a scene from the movie I Think I Love My Wife.

In November 2010, actor Jeff Goldblum performed the song in a duet with Markie on Late Night with Jimmy Fallon. The duet was highly requested by fans of the show and was set up by Fallon and the Roots.

In May 2012, Ray William Johnson's cartoon band Your Favorite Martian released a cover of the song, getting over 14 million views on YouTube as of December 2025.

In June 2023, his widow, Tara Hall, announced the Just a Friend Foundation and confirmed a documentary about Biz Markie’s life, All Up in the Biz, which premiered at the Tribeca Film Festival.

== Charts ==
=== Weekly charts ===
Chart (1989–1990)	Peak position
Canada Top Singles (RPM)	66
UK Singles (Official Charts)	55
US Billboard Hot 100	9
US Hot R&B/Hip-Hop Singles & Tracks (Billboard)	37
US Hot Rap Singles (Billboard)	5
US Cash Box Top 100	10

=== Year-end charts ===
Chart (1990)	Position
US Billboard Hot 100	94

== Certifications ==
Region	Certification	Certified units/sales
United States (RIAA)	Platinum	1,000,000^{^}
^{^} Shipments figures based on certification alone.
