= MC Shan =

American rapper

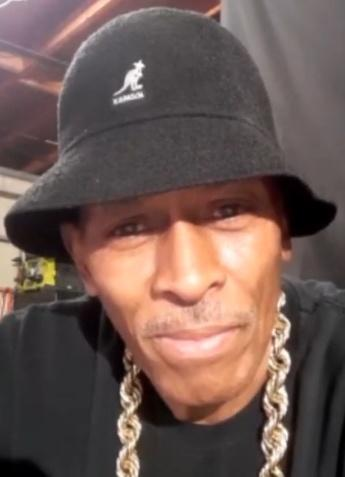
- MC Shan, 2021.

Background information
- Born: Shawn Moltke; September 6, 1965 (age 61); Queens, New York City, U.S.
- Genres: Hip-hop; R&B
- Occupations: Rapper; singer; songwriter; record producer
- Years active: 1982–present
- Labels: MCA; Bridge; Warner Bros.; Cold Chillin'
- Formerly of: Juice Crew

Shawn Moltke (born September 6, 1965), better known by his stage name MC Shan, is an American rapper, singer and record producer from the Queensbridge section of Queens, New York City. Beginning his career in the early-1980s, He is best known for his 1986 single "The Bridge," which was produced by Marley Marl and entered the Hot R&B/Hip-Hop Songs chart.

Shan is also known for his guest appearance and production on Canadian singer Snow's 1992 single "Informer", which peaked atop the Billboard Hot 100.

== Career ==
In 1985, Shan signed with MCA Records to release his debut single, "Feed the World", which became his only song with the label. He was also interviewed in the 1986 cult documentary Big Fun In The Big Town. MCA were not sure about what to do with hip hop, thus he was dismissed from the label. Not long after, Shan signed with Cold Chillin' Records due to his relationship with Marl, and joined Marl's Juice Crew. His debut album Down by Law was released by Warner Bros. in 1987. MC Shan was one of the first hip hop artists to have a major record deal with the label.

He also found himself to be a key player in the noted hip-hop rivalry known as the Bridge Wars, between the Juice Crew and Boogie Down Productions. Controversy rose from his 1986 single "The Bridge". The A-side, one of the first songs to sample "Impeach The President" (after the earlier "Get Physical" by Steady B, also produced by Marley Marl) tells the story of how his crew got started in Queensbridge Houses, the public housing projects just north of the Queensboro Bridge. It also provided a template for other artists to use it as Queens representative anthem. The B-side is a mild-tempered diss-track aimed at LL Cool J for his song Rock The Bells which took the beat from "Marley Scratch", a promo by Marlon and Shawn from 1985 on NIA Records. Although at the time this practice was not allowed, KRS-One however responded with a parody of "The Bridge" named "South Bronx," and the Juice Crew sampled that song with a reply, "Kill That Noise." Slate magazine described the conflict: "In 1986, it was a beef that launched the star of KRS-One." A week later, Boogie Down Productions then released "The Bridge is Over," widely celebrated among hip-hop fans as the highest rated diss track. Somehow all the negative attention went to MC Shan. Years later, MC Shan remade "The Bridge" into "Da Bridge 2001", and strongly denied the bridge "was over", saying:

The Bridge was never over
We left our mark
This jam is dedicated to you and your boys
I brought my Queensbridge thugs to kill that noise

Shan's second album, Born To Be Wild, followed in 1988 and revealed Shan's b-boy persona, with production once again by Marley Marl. 1990's Play it Again, Shan displayed a more mature style but it also proved to be his last album. When Cold Chillin's sub-label Livin' Large was active, Shan was listed as one of its artists but only released two singles ("Hip Hop Roughneck" b/w "Watchin' My Style" and "Pee-Nile Reunion" (prod. Large Professor, feat. Kool G Rap, Neek The Exotic, Snow, and Diesel) b/w "Don't Call It A Comeback"). Despite the fact that he focused more on his production career (like Snow's 12 Inches of Snow, which featured "Informer", on which he appeared) he recorded "Da Bridge 2001" for Nas' 2000 compilation called QB's Finest, which also featured Mobb Deep, Cormega, and Nature.

Shan had a brief stint in films, playing a bit role in Steve Martin's L.A. Story as Rappin' Waiter. Shan is credited as the guest rapper on the Sum 41 song "Dave's Possessed Hair/It's What We're All About" in the album Half Hour of Power.

In June 2017, MC Shan released his first new studio album in 27 years titled Bars Over Bullshit, which was released digitally through iTunes and Google Play.

== Discography ==
=== Studio albums ===
List of studio albums, with selected chart positions
Title	Album details	Peak chart positions
Title	Album details	US R&B /HH
Down by Law	Released: August 8, 1987; Label: Cold Chillin'/Warner; Formats: CD, LP, Cassette, digital download, streaming	40
Born to be Wild	Released: October 25, 1988; Label: Cold Chillin'/Warner; Format: CD, LP, Cassette, digital download	48
Play it Again, Shan	Released: April 11, 1990; Label: Cold Chillin'/Warner; Format: CD, LP, Cassette, digital download	40
Bars over Bullshit	Released: June 25, 2017; Label: Pioneered Dis Recordings; Format: LP, digital download, streaming	—
"—" denotes a recording that did not chart or was not released in that territory.

=== Unreleased albums ===
- You Love to Hear the Story (2007, Bungalo)

=== Compilation albums ===
List of compilation albums
Title	Album details
The Battle for Rap Supremacy	Released: 1996; Label: Cold Chillin'; Formats: CD, LP, Cassette
The Best Of Cold Chillin': MC Shan	Released: May 22, 2001; Label: Landspeed Records; Formats: CD, LP
Q.B.O.G.: The Best of M.C. Shan	Released: March 20, 2012; Label: Cold Chillin', Traffic Entertainment Group; Formats: CD

=== Singles ===
==== As lead artist ====
List of singles, with selected chart positions, showing year released and album name
Title	Year	Peak chart positions		Album
Title	Year	US R&B	US Rap	Album
"Feed the World"	1985	—	*	Non-album single
"Jane, Stop This Crazy Thing"	1986	—	*	Down by Law
"Beat Biter"	1986	—	*	Down by Law
"The Bridge"	1986	—	*	Down by Law
"Left Me Lonely" (featuring TJ Swan)	1987	71	*	Down by Law
"Down by Law (Remix)"	1987	—	*	Down by Law
"I Pioneered This"	1988	—	*	Born to Be Wild
"Juice Crew Law"	1988	—	*	Born to Be Wild
"It Don't Mean a Thing"	1990	—	29	Play it Again, Shan
"Ain't It Good to You"	1990	—	—	Play it Again, Shan
"Time for Us to Defend Ourselves"	1991	—	—	Play it Again, Shan
"Hip Hop Roughneck/Watchin' My Style"	1993	—	—	Non-album singles
"Pee-Nile Reunion" (featuring Kool G Rap, Neek the Exotic, Diesel & Snow)	1993	—	—	Non-album singles
"Kill That Noise"	1995	—	—	The Battle for Rap Supremacy
"Shan & The Queens Connect" (featuring Michael Myers)	1998	—	—	Non-album singles
"My Swagga Make My Chain Swing"	2009	—	—	Non-album singles
"Back to the Streets"	2010	—	—	Non-album singles
"Let's Bring Hip-Hop Back"	2012	—	—	Bars over Bullshit
"Every Body Wanna Be a Big Star"	2013	—	—	Bars over Bullshit
"Gritty"	2015	—	—	Non-album singles
"Bounce"	2021	—	—	Non-album singles
"—" denotes releases that did not chart or were not released in that country. "*" indicates a chart that did not exist at the time.

=== Singles ===
- 1985: "Marley Scratch"
- 1985: "Feed The World"
- 1986: "The Bridge"/"Beat Biter"
- 1986: "Jane, Stop This Crazy Thing"
- 1987: "Left Me Lonely"/"Kill That Noise"
- 1988: "A Mind Is A Terrible Thing To Waste'
- 1988: "I Pioneered This"
- 1988: "Juice Crew Law" / "They Used To Do It In The Park"
- 1990: "I Ran The Game"
- 1990: "It Don't Mean A Thing"
- 1991: "Time For Us To Defend Ourselves"
- 1991: "Ain't It Good To You"
- 1993: "Hip Hop Roughneck"
- 1993: "Pee-Nile Reunion" / "Don't Call It A Comeback"
- 2001: "Da Bridge 2001" (w QB's Finest)
- 2012: "Let's Bring Hip Hop Back"
- 2013: "Everybody Wanna Be A Big Star Drive A Big Car"

== External list ==
- MC Shan at Allmusic
