= Biz Markie =

American rapper and singer (1964–2021)

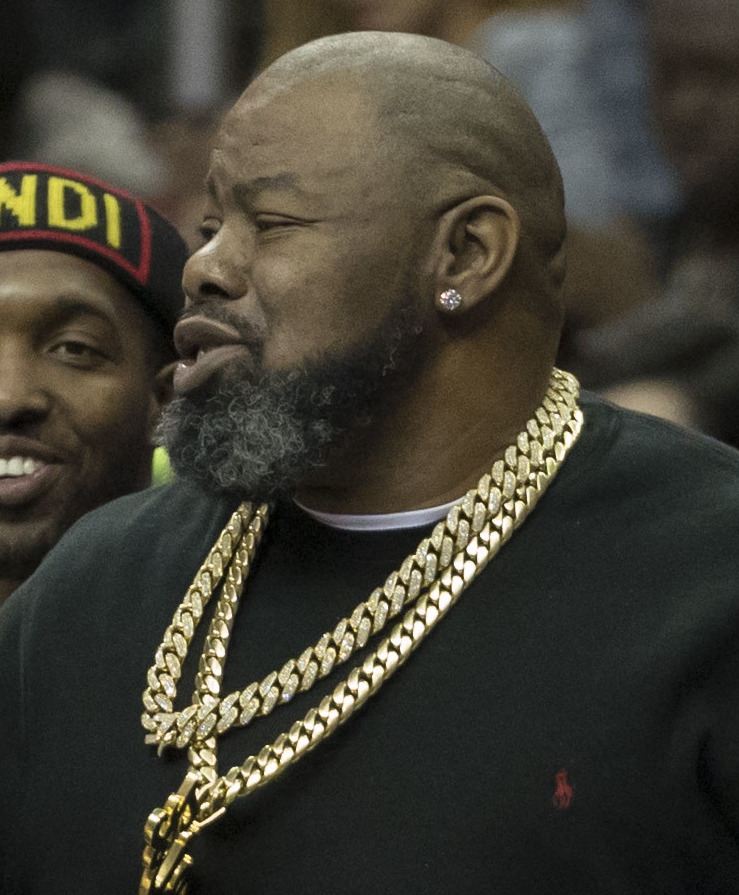
- Markie in 2018

Background information
- Born: Marcel Theo Hall; April 8, 1964; New York City, U.S.
- Origin: Long Island, New York, U.S.
- Died: July 16, 2021 (aged 57) Baltimore, Maryland, U.S.
- Genres: Hip-hop; golden age hip-hop; comedy hip-hop
- Occupations: Rapper; singer; songwriter; DJ; record producer
- Years active: 1984–2021
- Labels: Tommy Boy; Cold Chillin'; Warner Bros.
- Formerly of: Juice Crew; The Flip Squad
- Spouse: Tara Hall (m. 2018)
- Website: bizmarkie.com

Marcel Theo Hall (April 8, 1964 – July 16, 2021), professionally known as Biz Markie, was an American rapper, singer, songwriter, DJ, and record producer who gained prominence during hip-hop's golden age. He was known for his comedic style and often called the "Clown Prince of Hip-Hop".

Markie achieved mainstream success with his 1989 single "Just a Friend", which reached No. 9 on the U.S. Billboard Hot 100 chart and became a platinum-certified hit. The song is widely regarded as a classic, featuring prominently in pop culture and recognized on VH1's list of the greatest hip-hop songs. During his career, Markie was associated with such influential hip-hop groups and labels as the Juice Crew collective and Cold Chillin' Records.

Beyond his music, Biz Markie had an extensive presence in television and film, appearing in various roles and voiceovers in popular shows, movies, and commercials, including Men in Black II, Yo Gabba Gabba!, Empire, and SpongeBob SquarePants. He also appeared as himself in numerous television and radio broadcasts, and became a cultural personality beyond the music industry.

Biz Markie continued performing and making media appearances until health complications related to type 2 diabetes limited his activities in 2020. He died at the age of 57 on July 16, 2021. His legacy has been honored through various tributes, including street dedications, public memorials, and the documentary film All Up in the Biz.

== Early life and education ==
Markie was born in Manhattan in the neighborhood of Harlem, New York City, on April 8, 1964. He was raised on Long Island in the hamlet of Brentwood and the village of Patchogue, where he spent his teenage years and where, on September 25, 2021, the intersection of South Street and West Avenue, across the street from his then-home, was dedicated as Biz Markie Way. He graduated from Longwood High School in Middle Island in 1982. Markie began his career in New York City nightclubs and later gained regional recognition by performing at colleges in Washington, D.C., Maryland, Virginia and Pennsylvania. Regarding the origin of his stage name, the rapper said:

Biz comes from the first hip-hop tape I heard. It was '77, '78, from the L Brothers. Grand Wizard Theodore was the DJ, and the rappers was Kevvy Kev, Master Rob and Busy Bee Starski. I loved Busy Bee. Busy Bee just stuck with me. My name used to be Bizzy B Markie, and after a while I put the Biz with the Markie. My nickname in my neighborhood was Markie.

== Music career ==
=== 1980s ===
In the early 1980s after meeting in a mall, Biz Markie and Roxanne Shante developed a close friendship that led to their collaboration on the 1986 freestyle track "Def Fresh Crew", with Biz Markie beatboxing as depicted in the Netflix movie Roxanne Roxanne. Biz Markie played a significant role in Shante's early career and is considered a pioneer in the rap industry. Up until his death in 2021, they remained friends.

Biz Markie was interviewed in the 1986 cult documentary Big Fun in the Big Town. Markie released his debut album Goin' Off in 1988, which attracted a fair amount of attention, largely due to the lead single, "Make the Music with Your Mouth, Biz". The album also featured the underground hit singles "Nobody Beats The Biz", "Vapors", and "Pickin' Boogers". Biz also appeared briefly in the music video for Rob Base's single "It Takes Two".

On October 10, 1989, Markie's second studio album, The Biz Never Sleeps, was released on Cold Chillin'/Warner Bros. Records, produced by Markie, his cousin Cool V and Paul C. The single "Just a Friend" became Markie's most successful single, reaching No. 9 on the Billboard charts. The song interpolates the 1968 song "You Got What I Need" by singer-songwriter Freddie Scott, whose basic chord and melody provided the base for the song's chorus. "Just a Friend" was ranked 81st on VH1's 100 Greatest One-Hit Wonders in 2000, and later as number 100 on VH1's 100 Greatest Songs of Hip Hop in 2008. The music video, directed by Lionel C. Martin, chronicles the rapper's woman problems.

=== 1990s ===
Markie's third studio album I Need a Haircut was released on August 27, 1991, on Cold Chillin'/Warner Bros. Records; it was produced by Markie and his cousin Cool V. Sales of the album were already low when Markie was served a lawsuit by Gilbert O'Sullivan, who claimed that the album's "Alone Again" featured an unauthorized sample from his hit "Alone Again (Naturally)". O'Sullivan's claim was upheld in a landmark ruling, Grand Upright Music, Ltd. v. Warner Bros. Records Inc. that altered the landscape of hip-hop, finding that all samples must be cleared with the original artist before being used. In accordance with the ruling, Warner Bros., the parent company of Cold Chillin', had to pull I Need a Haircut from circulation, and all companies had to clear samples with the samples' creators before releasing the records. This development reflected the increasing popularity of hip-hop and the financial stakes involved. Markie responded in 1993 with the mischievously titled All Samples Cleared!, but his career had been hurt by the publicity emanating from the lawsuit, and the record suffered accordingly.

For the remainder of the decade, Markie occasionally made television appearances, including guest appearances on In Living Color; as contestant Damian "Foosball" Franklin in the recurring game show sketch "The Dirty Dozens"; as Marlon Cain in "Ed Bacon: Guidance Counselor"; in a 1996 freestyle rap commercial on MTV2; and in the 1993 superhero film Meteor Man. He also made numerous guest appearances with the Beastie Boys on Check Your Head (1992), Ill Communication (1994), Hello Nasty (1998), and their anthology The Sounds of Science (1999). He also rapped on the song "Schizo Jam" on Don Byron's 1998 release, Nu Blaxploitation (Blue Note/Capitol) and worked with Canibus on the first track on the Office Space soundtrack (1999). He also rapped on the track "So Fresh" alongside Slick Rick on Will Smith's 1999 album Willennium.

In 1996, Markie appeared on the Red Hot Organization's compilation CD, America Is Dying Slowly, alongside Wu-Tang Clan, Coolio, and Fat Joe, among others. The CD was meant to raise awareness of the AIDS epidemic among African-American men. In 1997, a sample of a Markie recording appeared in the Rolling Stones' song "Anybody Seen My Baby?" from their album Bridges to Babylon. Markie also teamed up with Frankie Cutlass on his third single and music video titled "The Cypher Part 3" with some of Marley Marl's Juice Crew veterans. He also appeared of Fünf Sterne deluxe's song "Will Smith, Meer Gayne?" from the album Sillium.

In 1999, Markie appeared on Len's song "Beautiful Day" on their album You Can't Stop the Bum Rush, as well as on Alliance Ethnik's album Fat Comeback.

=== 2000s ===
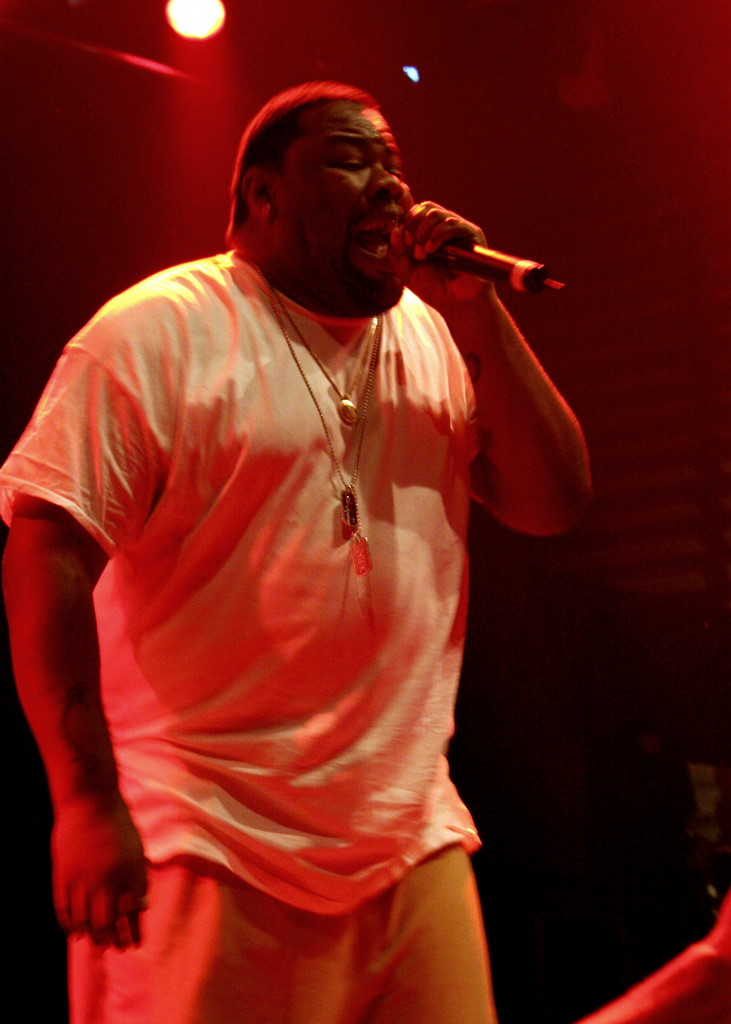
Markie performing in 2007

In 2000 and 2001, Markie participated in the Spitkicker Tour, which also hosted alternative hip-hop acts like De La Soul and Common. In 2002, Markie appeared in Men in Black II, with Will Smith and Tommy Lee Jones, playing an alien parody of himself, whose native language sounded exactly like beatboxing. He also provided rap vocals and sang the hook for the remixed version of Mario's single "Just a Friend 2002", which sampled his own song from 13 years before. Between 2002 and 2003, he appeared in episode 5 of the TV series Fastlane playing himself as a nightclub DJ.

In 2003, he appeared in the international television series Kung Faux performing a series of voice-over characters featured in a variety of episodes. In 2005, Markie detoured from his recording duties to appear on the first season of the television show Celebrity Fit Club, which challenged celebrities to lose weight by a combination of diet and exercise. Markie lost more weight than anybody else in the competition. That year, he was also in an episode of The Andy Milonakis Show. In 2006, his song "Pickin' Boogers" appeared on the soundtrack of the Volition video game Saints Row. Markie was a special guest on Nick Cannon's Wild 'n Out on season 1 and a cast member on season 4. Markie also had a beatboxing segment, "Biz's Beat of the Day", on the Nickelodeon show Yo Gabba Gabba!

Markie began opening in 2008 for Chris Rock on the comedian's "No Apologies" tour. Markie's act included spinning records ranging from old-school hip-hop to Lynyrd Skynyrd and then performing "Just a Friend". In December 2009, Biz Markie appeared in a RadioShack commercial, repeating the line: "Oh Snap! Guess what I saw!" from his song "Just a Friend". That same year saw his debut with Andy Milonakis in television commercials for the commercial Internet service Tune Up.

=== 2010s ===
In 2010, Markie appeared on VH1's 100 Greatest Artists of All Time, providing commentary throughout the series. Markie himself was not included on the list. On November 9, 2010, he appeared on the Aquabats! new EP, Radio Down! on the title track. On November 11, 2010, Markie sat in with the Roots on Late Night with Jimmy Fallon, and performed "Just a Friend" with actor Jeff Goldblum.

In 2013, Markie toured with the Yo Gabba Gabba! live show. That year, his song, "Just a Friend" was featured in Saints Row IV, which included the Pop station, 107.7 The Mix FM. He appeared on the Cartoon Network show Mad, as the Hip Hop Hobbit. He voiced Rudd Rhymez's DJ Tiny Timmy Scratch It in the Randy Cunningham: 9th Grade Ninja episode "Hip Hopocalypse Now".

Markie guest starred in the SpongeBob SquarePants episode "Kenny the Cat" in the episode's title role. His voice acting work also includes the voice of Snorlock the Beatboxing Slug in an episode of Adventure Time.

In 2014, Markie appeared in the Syfy network film Sharknado 2: The Second One. That same year, he threw a ceremonial first pitch for an Oakland Athletics baseball game. In 2016, his song "Just a Friend" was featured in the Netflix series Love as an ending theme for episode 4. He also made an appearance in the song "The Noisy Eater" off the album Wildflower by the Avalanches. Also in 2016, he appeared on the Fox TV series Empire as himself, where he performed "Just a Friend".

Markie was the DJ on the VH1 game show Hip Hop Squares between 2017 and 2019, a spin-off of the popular game show Hollywood Squares. He also rapped alongside singer Ke$ha on the Flaming Lips song "2012 (You Must Be Upgraded)". He made an appearance in the season 3 finale of the ABC series Black-ish in 2017. He performed a personal version of the song "Just a Friend", in which he added the names of the characters.

=== 2020s ===
In 2020, Markie started hosting a radio show on SiriusXM on LL Cool J's Rock the Bells Radio (channel 43) every weekday from 1:00 to 4:00 EST.

== Legal issues ==
In 1991, Biz Markie was sued for copyright infringement by Gilbert O'Sullivan. Judge Duffy ordered him to pay $250,000 in damages.

In March 2022, Markie's widow, Tara Hall, sued Jennifer Izumi, his former business manager, for damages and control of Biz Markie Inc. over widespread alleged intellectual property violations, including claims the manager stole song royalties and sold unauthorized merchandise.

== Illness and death ==
In April 2020, Markie was hospitalized due to severe complications from type 2 diabetes. In December 2020, it was reported that Markie was staying in a rehabilitation facility as a result of a stroke he had suffered after going into a diabetic coma.

On July 1, 2021, rumors of his death circulated on Twitter. His representative told Rolling Stone, "The news of Biz Markie's death is not true, Biz is still under medical care, surrounded by professionals who are working hard to provide the best healthcare possible." Markie died at a Baltimore hospital 15 days later on July 16, at age 57. His wife, Tara Hall, held his hand as he took his last breath. He is buried at Pinelawn Memorial Park and Arboretum in Farmingdale, New York.

== Legacy ==
Upon news of Markie's death, many celebrities and figures expressed their sympathies. Tara Hall received condolences from President Barack Obama and his wife Michelle Obama. Markie's funeral in Patchogue, New York, was attended by friends and family, including Ice T, Fat Joe, Montell Jordan, and Al B. Sure!. His eulogy was read by Reverend Al Sharpton.

In November 2022, Paramount Global announced that Showtime in conjunction with Mass Appeal would release a documentary on Biz Markie's life. The documentary, All Up in the Biz, was directed by Sacha Jenkins. The movie features reenactments, interviews, and stock footage. Featured in the documentary are Big Daddy Kane, Rakim, Doug E Fresh, Nick Cannon, Tracy Morgan, Tara Hall and more. The score was produced by Markie's friend Prince Paul. In June 2023, Hall announced the Just A Friend Foundation and confirmed All Up in the Biz was premiering at the Tribeca Film Festival.

== Discography ==
=== Studio albums ===
List of studio albums, with selected chart positions and certifications
| Title | Album details | Peak chart positions | | Certifications |
| Title | Album details | US | US R&B /HH | Certifications |
|---|---|---|---|---|
| Goin' Off | Released: February 23, 1988; Label: Cold Chillin', Warner Bros.; Format: Cassette Tape, 12" Record Disc | 90 | 19 | |
| The Biz Never Sleeps | Released: October 10, 1989; Label: Cold Chillin', Warner Bros.; Format: Cassette Tape, 12" Record Disc | 66 | 9 | RIAA: Gold |
| I Need a Haircut | Released: August 27, 1991; Label: Cold Chillin', Warner Bros.; Format: Cassette Tape, CD | 113 | 44 | |
| All Samples Cleared! | Released: June 22, 1993; Label: Cold Chillin', Warner Bros.; Format: CD, Cassette Tape | ― | 43 | |
| Weekend Warrior | Released: November 18, 2003; Label: Tommy Boy; Format: CD, digital download | ― | ― | |
"—" denotes a recording that did not chart or was not released in that territory.

=== Compilation albums ===
| Title | Album details | Peak chart positions |
| Title | Album details | US Com. |
|---|---|---|
| Biz's Baddest Beats | Released: July 1, 1994; Label: Cold Chillin'; Format: CD, digital download | 2 |
| On the Turntable | Released: August 25, 1998; Label: P-Vine; Format: CD, digital download | ― |
| On the Turntable 2 | Released: September 25, 2000; Label: Pony Canyon; Format: CD, digital download | ― |
| Greatest Hits | Released: May 7, 2002; Label: LandSpeed; Format: CD, digital download | ― |
| Ultimate Diabolical | Released: October 9, 2007; Label: Traffic Entertainment; Format: CD, digital download | ― |
| Diabolical: The Biz's Greatest Hits | Released: 2009; Label: Traffic Entertainment; Format: CD, digital download | ― |
"—" denotes a recording that did not chart or was not released in that territory.

=== EPs ===
List of extended plays with selected chart positions
| Title | EP details | Peak chart positions |
| Title | EP details | US R&B |
|---|---|---|
| Make the Music with Your Mouth, Biz | Released: 1986; Re-issued: 2006; Label: Prism; Format: CD, digital download | 84 |

=== Singles ===
| Title | Year | Peak chart positions | | | | | Certifications | Album |
| Title | Year | US | US R&B | US Rap | CAN | UK | Certifications | Album |
|---|---|---|---|---|---|---|---|---|
| "Nobody Beats the Biz" (featuring TJ Swan) | 1987 | — | — | — | — | — | | Goin' Off |
| "Pickin’ Boogers" | 1987 | — | — | — | — | — | | Goin' Off |
| "Vapors" | 1988 | — | 80 | — | — | — | | Goin' Off |
| "Biz Is Goin' Off" | 1988 | — | — | — | — | — | | Goin' Off |
| "This Is Something for the Radio" | 1988 | — | — | — | — | — | | Goin' Off |
| "Just a Friend" | 1989 | 9 | 37 | 5 | 66 | 55 | RIAA: Platinum | The Biz Never Sleeps |
| "Spring Again" | 1989 | — | — | — | — | — | | The Biz Never Sleeps |
| "What Comes Around Goes Around" | 1991 | ― | 84 | 4 | ― | ― | | I Need a Haircut |
| "T.S.R. (Toilet Stool Rap)/Busy Doing Nuthin" | 1991 | — | — | — | — | — | | I Need a Haircut |
| "Let Me Turn You On" | 1993 | — | — | 7 | — | — | | All Samples Cleared! |
| "Young Girl Bluez" | 1993 | — | — | 4 | — | — | | All Samples Cleared! |
| "Let Go My Eggo" | 1995 | ― | — | — | ― | ― | | I Need a Haircut |
| "And I Rock" (with DJ Premier and Black Indian) | 2000 | — | — | — | — | — | | Non-album single |
| "Let Me See You Bounce" (with Elephant Man) | 2003 | ― | ― | ― | ― | 77 | | Weekend Warrior |
"—" denotes a recording that did not chart or was not released in that territory.

== Guest appearances ==
( ^{_|} signifies an associated music video)
| | Year | Album | Artist |
|---|---|---|---|
| Just Rhymin' with Biz | 1988 | Long Live the Kane | Big Daddy Kane |
| We Write the Songs | 1988 | In Control, Volume 1 | Marley Marl, Heavy D |
| Erase Racism^{_|} | 1990 | Wanted: Dead or Alive | Kool G Rap, Big Daddy Kane |
| Bugged Out Day at Powerplay; Oh What a Night^{_|} | 1991 | The Grand Imperial Diamond Shell | Diamond Shell |
| The Biz Vs. the Nuge | 1992 | Check Your Head | Beastie Boys |
| Stone Age | 1993 | Buhloone Mindstate | De La Soul |
| Lovely How I Let My Mind Float | 1993 | Buhloone Mindstate | De La Soul |
| Do It | 1994 | Ill Communication | Beastie Boys |
| Pass the Lovin' (DUI Mix) | 1994 | Non-album single | Brownstone |
| Get on Up^{_|} | 1994 | Basic Need to Howl | Milo Z |
| Nuttin' but Flavor^{_|} | 1995 | The Mix Tape Volume 1 | Funkmaster Flex, Ol' Dirty Bastard, Charlie Wanker |
| Freestyle '95 | 1995 | H | DJ Honda |
| Don't Take It Personal (Biz Markie Remix) | 1995 | Non-album single | Monica |
| I've Got You (Under My Skin) | 1996 | The Great White Hype (soundtrack) | Lou Rawls |
| That's the Way (I Like It) | 1996 | You've Got to Believe in Something and Space Jam (soundtrack) | Spin Doctors |
| No Rubber, No Backstage Pass | 1996 | America Is Dying Slowly | Prince Paul, Chubb Rock |
| Let Me Clear My Throat (Old School Reunion Remix '96)^{_|} | 1996 | Non-album single | DJ Kool, Doug E. Fresh |
| The Energy Blues | 1996 | Schoolhouse Rock! Rocks | —N/a |
| I'm Hungry | 1996 | Phat Beach (soundtrack) | —N/a |
| The Cypher Part III^{_|} | 1997 | Politics & Bullshit | Frankie Cutlass, Class of '88 |
| BMT | 1997 | Sound Museum | Towa Tei, Mos Def |
| The Grasshopper Unit (Keep Movin) | 1998 | Hello Nasty | Beastie Boys |
| Odd Couple | 1998 | Who Got the Gravy? | Digital Underground |
| Will Smith, Meer Gayne? | 1998 | Sillium | Funf Sterne Deluxe |
| Rhymin' wit Biz | 1998 | El Nino | Def Squad |
| It's da Biz | 1998 | The Flip Squad Allstar DJs | Kia Jeffries |
| Fat Come Back | 1999 | Fat Comeback | Alliance Ethnik, Vinia Mojica |
| Mr. Large | 1999 | A Prince Among Thieves | Prince Paul |
| Beautiful Day | 1999 | You Can't Stop the Bum Rush | Len |
| You're a Clown!! | 1999 | A Musical Massacre | The Beanuts, Tyler Fernandez |
| So Fresh^{_|} | 1999 | Willenium | Will Smith, Slick Rick |
| Calling the Biz | 1999 | So... How's Your Girl? | Handsome Boy Modeling School |
| Snowflake | 1999 | Bigger and Blacker | Chris Rock |
| In the Hands of the Gods | 2000 | Fragments of Freedom | Morcheebaa |
| Something for the People | 2000 | Shadow of the Ape Sounds | Nigo |
| Makin' Cash Money | 2000 | Get Em Psyched!!! | Black Indian |
| Girls, Girls, Girls {background}^{_|} | 2001 | The Blueprint | Jay-Z |
| Genius of Love 2000 | 2002 | Built from Scratch | The X-Ecutioners |
| Hold Up | 2002 | Clearing the Field | Motion Ma |
| On and On | 2003 | Aja | Aja |
| My Mic | 2003 | Nick Cannon | Nick Cannon |
| Walk in Gutta | 2007 | Red Gone Wild: Thee Album | Def Squad |
| $ Can't Buy Me Love | 2007 | Return of the Magnificent | DJ Jazzy Jeff |
| Radio Down | 2010 | Hi-Five Soup | The Aquabats |

== See also ==
- List of people from Harlem
