= Cold Chillin' Records =

Defunct American record label

- Parent company: Traffic Entertainment
- Founded: 1986; 39 years ago
- Defunct: 1998
- Status: Defunct
- Distributors: Warner Bros. Records (1988–1993); Epic Street (1995–1997)
- Genre: Hip-hop; Contemporary R&B
- Country of origin: United States
- Location: New York City, New York

Cold Chillin' Records was a record label that released music during the golden age of hip-hop from the late 1980s to the early 1990s. A producer-and-crew label founded by manager Tyrone Williams and run by Len Fichtelberg (1930–November 4, 2010), most of the label's releases were by members of the Juice Crew, a loosely knit group of artists centered on producer Marley Marl. In 1998, the label shut down, and the majority of its catalog was bought by Massachusetts-based LandSpeed Records (now Traffic Entertainment).

== History ==
Initially, Cold Chillin' was a subsidiary of Prism Records, but label head Tyrone Williams and Fichtelberg decided to merge their companies, and Prism was absorbed by Cold Chillin'. In 1988, it signed a five-year distribution deal with Warner Bros. Records, which remained intact for its full duration. However, since Kool G Rap and DJ Polo's third album, Live And Let Die, was rejected by Warner Bros. on behalf of parent company Time Warner because of the anti-gangsta and anti-Time Warner sentiments that followed in the footsteps of the Cop Killer controversy involving hip hop artist Ice-T, Cold Chillin' opted to distribute the album independently. And, as such, it did so with various projects throughout the remaining years of activity, including its short-lived distribution deal with the Epic Street division of Epic Records, which released two albums by the label: the second album by Grand Daddy I.U. and the debut solo effort by Kool G Rap.

Cold Chillin' also formed a sub-label named Livin' Large, which released Roxanne Shante's and YZ's second albums along with several titles by other artists, and was distributed by former Warner Bros. Records subsidiary Tommy Boy Records as part of its deal with Warner.

After it closed down in 1998, rights of the Cold Chillin' catalogue were purchased by Massachusetts-based LandSpeed Records, now known as Traffic Entertainment Group. Along with Ruthless Records, Death Row Records, and Rap-A-Lot Records, Cold Chillin' Records is widely respected for serious contributions to hip hop music during its formative years. In 2006, LandSpeed started releasing new versions of the classic albums in Cold Chillin's' catalog with their original artwork intact. However, the albums recorded by Big Daddy Kane remained with Warner Bros. Records, and Kool G Rap's 4,5,6 remained with Epic Records.

In December 2025, it was announced and confirmed that Tyrone "Fly Ty" Williams had died.

== Discography ==
=== Albums ===
Albums marked with (+) were distributed by Warner Bros. Records' sister label Reprise Records.
Albums marked with (*) were distributed by Epic Street.
Albums marked with (§) were released on sub-label Livin' Large and distributed by Tommy Boy Records

1987

- MC Shan—Down by Law

1988

- Biz Markie—Goin' Off
- Big Daddy Kane—Long Live the Kane
- Marley Marl—In Control, Volume 1
- MC Shan—Born to Be Wild

1989

- Kool G Rap & DJ Polo—Road to the Riches
- Big Daddy Kane—It's a Big Daddy Thing +
- Biz Markie—The Biz Never Sleeps
- Roxanne Shanté—Bad Sister +

1990

- 2 Deep—Honey, That's Show Biz +
- MC Shan—Play It Again, Shan
- Masta Ace—Take a Look Around +
- Kool G Rap & DJ Polo—Wanted: Dead or Alive
- Grand Daddy I.U.—Smooth Assassin +
- Big Daddy Kane—Taste of Chocolate +

1991

- Big Daddy Kane—Prince of Darkness +
- Kid Capri—The Tape
- Diamond Shell—The Grand Imperial Diamond Shell +
- Biz Markie—I Need a Haircut
- Marley Marl—In Control Volume II (For Your Steering Pleasure)
- The Genius—Words from the Genius +

1992

- Kool G Rap & DJ Polo—Live and Let Die
- Roxanne Shante—The Bitch is Back §
- Nubian M.O.B. - Nubian M.O.B. +

1993

- Big Daddy Kane—Looks Like a Job For… +
- Biz Markie—All Samples Cleared!
- TBTBT—Too Bad to be True
- YZ—The Ghetto's Been Good to Me §
- T.C.F. Crew—Come & Play with Me

1994

- Grand Daddy I.U.—Lead Pipe *
- King Sun—Strictly Ghetto

1995

- Kool G Rap—4,5,6 *

=== Non-album singles ===
- Juice Crew All-Stars—"Juice Crew All-Stars"
- Big Scoob—"Suckaz Can't Hang"
- Big Scoob—"Champagne on the Block"
- Juice Crew All-Stars—"Cold Chillin' Christmas"
- Juice Crew All-Stars featuring TJ Swan—“Evolution”
- LBs (Little Bastards)—“Bitch, Get a job” §

== See also ==
- Roxanne Wars
- The Bridge Wars
- Prism Records
