= The Show (eMC album) =

Studio album by eMC
- Released: March 25, 2008
- Recorded: 2005–07
- Genres: East Coast hip hop; underground hip hop
- Length: 1:14:35
- Labels: M3 Records; Traffic Entertainment Group
- Producers: Ayatollah; Frequency; J!; Koolade; Marco Polo; Nicolay; Quincy Tones; The ARE

EMC chronology
| The Show (2008) | The Turning Point (2014) |

Singles from The Show
- 1. "E.M.C. What It Stands For?" Released: September 25, 2007

Masta Ace chronology
| A Long Hot Summer (2004) | The Show (2008) | Arts & Entertainment (2009) |

Wordsworth chronology
| Mirror Music (2004) | The Show (2008) | The Photo Album (2012) |

Professional ratings
Aggregate scores
| Source | Rating |
|---|---|
| Metacritic | 77/100 |
Review scores
| Source | Rating |
| AllMusic | 4/5 stars |
| The A.V. Club | B+ |
| Drowned in Sound | 8/10 |
| HipHopDX | 4/5 |
| Pitchfork | 7.9/10 |
| PopMatters | 7/10 |
| RapReviews | 8.5/10 |
| Robert Christgau | (2-star Honorable Mention) |

The Show is the debut studio album by American hip hop supergroup eMC. It was released on March 25, 2008 via M3 Records/Traffic Entertainment Group. Production was handled by Frequency, J!, Quincy Tones, Ayatollah, The ARE, Koolade, Marco Polo and Nicolay, with DJ Rob, Filthy Rich and Masta Ace serving as executive producers. Beside members Masta Ace, Punchline, Wordsworth and Strick, it features guest appearances from Adi, Ladybug Mecca, Little Brother, Money Harm and Sean Price.

== Background ==
While it was originally rumored that Ace had retired from music after the release of his acclaimed 2004 concept album A Long Hot Summer, the following year the veteran had formed the new collective with his protégé, Milwaukee rapper Strick, and revered underground lyricists Punch & Words. The four had previously collaborated on numerous albums and tracks, and toured extensively as a collective.

Like Ace's previous albums, A Long Hot Summer and Disposable Arts, The Show is a thematic concept album that tells a story. The album's story follows a day in the life of eMC doing a show on the road.

== Singles ==
The first official eMC track, the Ayatollah-produced "Four Brothers", was released in 2006. A music video for the song was released online on December 10, 2006, however, this track was not included on the album. Music videos were released for "What It Stand For" and "Leak It Out" as well.

== Track listing ==
| No. | Title | Writer(s) | Producer(s) | Length |
|---|---|---|---|---|
| 1. | "Who We Be" | Duval Clear; Vinson Jamel Johnson; Rashaan Truell; Stephen Stricklin; Matko Sasek | Koolade | 3:16 |
| 2. | "The Airport" (featuring Paul Nice and Eternia) | | | 1:37 |
| 3. | "Leak It Out" | Clear; Johnson; Truell; Stricklin; Phillip R. Gonzalez | The ARE | 3:28 |
| 4. | "The Check In" (featuring Paul Nice) | | | 0:56 |
| 5. | "Traffic" (featuring Little Brother) | Clear; Truell; Phonte Lyshod Coleman; Thomas Louis Jones; S. McCaffery | Quincy Tones | 4:17 |
| 6. | "Say Now" | Clear; Johnson; Truell; Stricklin; Gonzalez | The ARE | 4:16 |
| 7. | "The Message" | | | 0:47 |
| 8. | "Don't Give Up on Us" (featuring ADI) | Clear; Johnson; Truell; Stricklin; Bryan Fryzel | Frequency | 3:38 |
| 9. | "Git Sum" (featuring Sean Price) | Clear; Johnson; Truell; Stricklin; Sean Price; J. Balde | J! | 3:39 |
| 10. | "We Alright" (featuring Terrel Howard) | Clear; Johnson; Stricklin; Fryzel | Frequency | 3:47 |
| 11. | "The Interview" (featuring Amanda Diva) | | | 0:58 |
| 12. | "Emc (What It Stand For?)" (featuring Adanita Ross) | Clear; Johnson; Truell; Stricklin; Matthijs Rook | Nicolay | 3:18 |
| 13. | "The Angry Merch Guy" (featuring Stephen "FaTone" Mills) | | | 1:23 |
| 14. | "The Grudge" | Clear; Johnson; Truell; Stricklin; Lamont Dorrell | Ayatollah | 3:49 |
| 15. | "Make It Better" (featuring Adanita Ross and Angelita Ross) | Clear; Johnson; Truell; Stricklin; Balde | J! | 3:45 |
| 16. | "The Lobby" (featuring Paul Nice) | | | 1:01 |
| 17. | "Winds of Change" | Clear; Johnson; Truell; Stricklin; McCaffery | Quincy Tones | 4:21 |
| 18. | "The Show" (featuring Ladybug Mecca) | Clear; Johnson; Truell; Stricklin; Mary Ann "Khalilah Azraa" Vieira; Balde | J! | 3:48 |
| 19. | "The Backstage" (featuring Marco Polo and Torae) | | | 1:05 |
| 20. | "Borrow You" | Clear; Johnson; Truell; Stricklin; Dorrell | Ayatollah | 3:26 |
| 21. | "Once More" | Clear; Johnson; Truell; Stricklin; Marco Bruno | Marco Polo | 3:49 |
| 22. | "U Let Me Grow" | Clear; Johnson; Truell; Stricklin; McCaffery | Quincy Tones | 4:58 |
| 23. | "Feel It" (featuring Money Harm and Katrina Chambers) | Clear; Johnson; Truell; Stricklin; Marvin Moore-Hough; Fryzel | Frequency | 5:26 |
| 24. | Untitled | | | 3:47 |
| Total length: | | | | 1:14:35 |

== Personnel ==
eMC

- Duval "Masta Ace" – vocals, mixing, executive producer
- Vinson "Wordsworth" Johnson – vocals, recording
- Rashaan "Punchline" Truell – vocals
- Stephen "Strick" Stricklin – vocals

Technical

- Matko "Koolade" Sasek – producer (track 1)
- Phillip "The ARE" Gonzalez – producer (tracks: 3, 6)
- S. "Quincy Tones" McCaffery – producer (tracks: 5, 17, 22)
- Bryan "Frequency" Fryzel – producer (tracks: 8, 10, 23)
- J. "J!" Balde – producer (tracks: 9, 15, 18)
- Matthijs "Nicolay" Rook – producer (track 12)
- Lamont "Ayatollah" Dorrell – producer (tracks: 14, 20)
- Marco "Marco Polo" Bruno – producer (track 21)
- Filthy Rich – recording, mixing, executive producer
- DJ Rob – recording, executive producer
- Robert Alphonse – art direction
- Francois Bonura – photography
- Marvin Anthony – photography
- Peter Chin – photography

Guest vocalists

- Phonte of Little Brother – vocals (track 5)
- Thomas Jones a.k.a. Big Pooh of Little Brother – vocals (track 5)
- ADI of Growing Nation – vocals (track 8)
- Sean Price a.k.a. Ruck of Heltah Skeltah – vocals (track 9)
- Mariana Khalilah Azraa Vieira a.k.a. Ladybug Mecca of Digable Planets – vocals (track 18)
- Marvin Moore-Hough a.k.a. Money Harm of The Product G&B – vocals (track 23)
- Terrel Howard – additional vocals (track 10)
- Adanita Ross – additional vocals (tracks: 12, 15)
- Angelita Ross – additional vocals (track 15)

Musicians

- DJ Eclipse – scratches (track 12)
- Anthony Lucas – bass (track 20)

"The Cast"

- Paul Nice as Adam
- Amanda Diva
- Eternia as Club MP3 Voicemail
- Stephen Mills aka FaTone as Merch Man
- Torae as security guard
- Marco Polo as boyfriend
- April Hill as fan
- Katrina Chambers as hotel manager
