= Trap Door (A-F-R-O album) =

Compilation album by A-F-R-O
- Released: December 26, 2025
- Recorded: 2014–2025
- Studio: The Lair of FRO Thizzle/Worldwide
- Genres: Hip-hop, underground hip-hop
- Length: 1 hour, 20 minutes
- Languages: English, Spanish, German
- Label: FRO Thizzle Productions
- Producer: A-F-R-O

A-F-R-O chronology
Trap Door (2025)	Trap Door 2 (2026)

Trap Door is a compilation full-length album by American rapper and producer A-F-R-O. It was released on December 26, 2025 by FRO Thizzle Productions. The album features guest appearances from Jon Connor, Blu, Termanology, Reks, and more.

== Background ==
A-F-R-O began developing Trap Door late 2014. The idea originated from friends having fun and rapping over A-F-R-O's production. As the years went by, FRO began to take the album more seriously, and strived to make his production stronger and more cinematic.

A-F-R-O announced the completion of Trap Door in early 2025, a decade later. FRO revealed the majority of emcees that are featured on the album via Instagram.

The first single "Riddle 2 Dribble" featuring Blu, EKYM1536, MotionPlus, and D Blat was released on October 17, 2025.

Another single and highlight is "Da Buck Stops" featuring Termanology. Actor and comedian Will Sasso makes a notable appearance as the Narrator for the album's intro. A-F-R-O asked Sasso to guest appear after following each other for many years, and Sasso delivered his work in a quick turnaround.

== Critical reception ==
Trap Door received positive reviews from music critics.

Hip Hop Golden Age says, "Normally, compilation albums don’t make the cut here—especially ones pulling from a decade of material—but Trap Door earns the exception. Across twenty dense tracks and over an hour of pure Hip Hop, A-F-R-O packs in a wild mix of voices, styles, and moods, all tied together by his rugged, sample-driven production. The drums knock hard, the loops hit deep, and the cypher energy never dips. “Riddle 2 Dribble,” “Junkyard Dawgz,” and “Da Buck Stops” offer teeth and humor in equal measure, proving A-F-R-O’s ear for rhythm is sharper than ever. The record runs on craft and community—street wisdom, levity, and lyrical precision stacked tight from end to end. As a producer and curator, he’s in full command here. Still, it’s time for a front-to-back solo LP—A-F-R-O’s bars deserve a complete stage of their own."

== Track listing ==
All music is composed by A-F-R-O.

Credits adapted from Apple Music.
No.	Title	Length
1.	"Trap Door Intro / Sayonara (feat. Will Sasso, Reks, Status the Marlboro Man, Emanyouill, iNTeLL, & Seuss Mace)"
2.	"Riddle 2 Dribble (feat. Blu, EKYM1536, MotionPlus, & D Blat)"
3.	"C U at da Top (feat. EKYM1536, MotionPlus, Elena Charis, Tevo Jordan, & Dillon Maurer)"
4.	"Da Buck Stops (feat. Termanology)"
5.	"Off da Hook (feat. Jam Young, Pulse Reaction, H3ro, & Curt Sharp)"
6.	"High Alert / Skit (feat. Super Star of Horror City & Sean the White Rapper)"
7.	"Da Dungeon (feat. Felcon, CanonMouse, Pulse Reaction, & Emsee Prospekt)"
8.	"Baby Fetus & Da Bum (feat. Amiri Lavelle & SuperBrownBum)"
9.	"Neck Broken / Skit (feat. Wordsworth, John Jigg$, & Emsee Prospekt / George Paez)"
10.	"No Betta (feat. Young Hump, Tevo Jordan, Jam Young, 60 East & MotionPlus)"
11.	"Ikiru / Dead Man's Door (feat. StarrLight, Truth0470, J. Loot, Eksale & AWOL Da Mindwriter)"
12.	"Three Chamberz / Skit (feat. DudeSirius, D Blat, Blind Toxic & Amir Sadeghi)"
13.	"Den of Thieves (feat. m1L, Srvent, illustrate, Little Giant, Flotrix, DoubleJ, Scott Free & FattyB)"
14.	"Hiroyuki (feat. MZ1, Golden Buddha, Elena Charis, Pulse Reaction, Eighty Spadez & MotionPlus)"
15.	"Junkyard Dawgz (feat. Jon Connor, H3ro, EKYM1536 & Chosen Kingz)"
16.	"Carnage / Gimme a Break (feat. Eddi Brocc, Omar Rapp$, Twistello, Rash Reed & D Blat)"
17.	"My Nightz / On da Lookout! (feat. DudeSirius & Rod)"
18.	"BBQ Session (Posse Part 4) (feat. K.I.D. Casper, Felcon, Axiom ThaWyze, EKYM1536, Kamari Leaha, Emsee Prospekt, Pulse Reaction, MotionPlus & Kabster)"
19.	"Da Last Straw / Carnage, Pt. 2 (feat. Solitude, MZ1, Kabster, H3ro, MotionPlus & Emsee Prospekt)"
20.	"Stop Frontin’ (feat. MotionPlus, Elena Charis, SuperBrownBum & Pulse Reaction)"
Total length:		1 hour, 20 minutes
