= Trap Door 2 =

Compilation album by A-F-R-O
- Released: August 28, 2026
- Recorded: 2020–2026
- Genres: Hip-hop, horrorcore
- Length: 1 hr, 15 mins
- Languages: English, German, Polish, Spanish
- Label: FRO Thizzle Productions
- Producer: A-F-R-O

A-F-R-O chronology
Trap Door (2025)	Trap Door 2 (2026)

Trap Door 2 is a compilation full-length album by American rapper and producer A-F-R-O. It was released on August 28, 2026 by FRO Thizzle Productions. The album features guest appearances from Bishop Lamont, Jon Connor, Blu, Wordsworth, Novel, MotionPlus, and many more.

== Background ==
While the first Trap Door took nearly 11 years to complete, the sequel took half a year to finish.

The first single, "Abandon Ship," was released on July 25, 2026. A video for the second single, "Play on Wordz," featuring Bishop Lamont, Wordsworth, and Terror Van Poo was released on August 21, 2026.

The third single, "Barb Wire," featuring Blaq Poet and Blind Toxic was released on August 14, 2026.

== Critical reception ==
Trap Door 2 garnered positive reviews.

Hip Hop Golden Age ranked the album number 5 on their "9 Best Hip-Hop Albums of August 2026," scoring higher than Ice-T's Criminal Migraine, and also placed the album on their "Best Hip Hop Albums of 2026.

"A-F-R-O returns with Trap Door 2, a sprawling 20-track sequel to last December’s Trap Door and another reminder of why he remains one of the most exciting lyricists in underground Hip Hop. Clocking in at over 75 minutes, the album is packed with intricate rhyme patterns, rapid-fire flows, dark humor, and theatrical storytelling, all backed by production handled entirely by A-F-R-O himself. “Barb Wire” with Blaq Poet and the stacked “Captain Now” are particular highlights. Trap Door 2 is unapologetically rooted in the fundamentals: sharp rhymes, inventive beats, scratches, and MCs going for broke. A dope follow-up to Trap Door, this is pure Hip Hop."

Ambrosia For Heads highlighted Trap Door 2 and A-F-R-O's production, naming "Feel da Beat," as a standout track.

== Track listing ==
All music is composed by A-F-R-O.

All credits adapted from Apple Music.
No.	Title	Length
1.	"Trap Door 2 Intro (feat. Amir Sadeghi)"
2.	"Tavern of Evil (feat. Emsee Prospekt, EKYM1536, Eighty Spadez, Elena Charis, Truth0470, Flotrix, and MotionPlus)"
3.	"Play on Wordz (feat. Bishop Lamont, Wordsworth, TERROR VAN POO / MotionPlus)"
4.	"Feel da Beat (feat. K.I.D. Casper, Big Earth, Procyse, and m1L)"
5.	"Mystic Men (feat. Lone.Fractal, LIL GHO$T, Meta4us, King Khazm, Es-1, Mystic, Ojo Jones, Everaldo Zacarias Jr, and DJ E-DuB)"
6.	"Armageddon (feat. Alan Z, Sevin Soprano, Rumor the God, and Emsee Prospekt)"
7.	"Vertigo / Skit (feat. MotionPlus and MaceyOMaze / Aaron Nakapaahuu)"
8.	"Murder She Wrote (feat. K.I.D. Casper and Eighty Spadez)"
9.	"Manfredi / Sean the White Rapper (feat. MZ1, ?nowledge, Es-1, Abe the Freak, Sammy Warm Hands, Open Minded / Sean the White Rapper)"
10.	"Abandon Ship / Jungle Skit (feat. Greybeard, Status the Marlboro Man, Eighty Spadez, and Rash Reed / Blind Toxic)"
11.	"Records & Tapes (feat. m1L and SuperBrownBum)"
12.	"Tony Hawk / Skit (feat. K.I.D. Casper, Baller Brown, Eighty Spadez, Felcon, and Mando the DJ)"
13.	"Now or Later / Wiseguy (feat. Pulse Reaction, StrataG / Emsee Prospekt, Trevor "Young Lord" Davison)"
14.	"From da Heart (feat. Souleye, Irakoski, WO6EPH, Erik Solo, AA, Kevin Mic Check, Nick Name)"
15.	"Captain Now / Skit (feat. Jon Connor, Blu, MZ1, Yah-Ra, MC Wicks, Madd Illz, Eksale, Felcon, Rod / Kamari Leaha)"
16.	"Smooth Operator (feat. 60 East, Jam Young, & H3RO)"
17.	"Supaman (feat. Eddi Brocc, Big Chief Smash, and DJ Ace the Cut LIeutenant)"
18.	"Junkyard Dawgz 2 / Moovin' (feat. EKYM1536, iLLIODD, Elena Charis, Divine Flowz, H3RO, Ace of Chosen Kingz / D Blat)"
19.	"Barb Wire (feat. Blaq Poet and Blind Toxic)"
20.	"Against the World / Outro (feat. Novel, Wordsworth, and MotionPlus / George Paez)"
Total length:		1 hr, 15 mins.
