= The Breaks (2016 film) =

- Promotional poster
- Based on: "The Big Payback" by Dan Charnas
- Written by: Seith Mann
- Directed by: Seith Mann
- Starring: Wood Harris; Mack Wilds; Afton Williamson; David Call; Method Man
- Music by: DJ Premier
- Country of origin: United States
- Original language: English

Production
- Production company: VH1 Productions

Original release
- Network: VH1
- Release: January 4, 2016

The Breaks is a 2016 American television hip-hop drama film that chronicles the life of three friends during the early 1990s hip-hop scene. The film stars Wood Harris, Mack Wilds, Afton Williamson, David Call and rapper Method Man. Inspired by journalist Dan Charnas' book "The Big Payback", The Breaks was written and directed by Seith Mann and executive produced by Mann, Charnas, and Maggie Malina, along with Susan Levison and Bill Flanagan.

The Breaks premiered on VH1 on January 4, 2016.

On February 16, 2016, VH1 picked up The Breaks to become a full television series.

== Cast ==
- Afton Williamson as Nikki Jones
- Wood Harris as Barry Fouray
- Mack Wilds as Daryl “DeeVee” Van Putten, Jr.
- David Call as David Aaron
- Antoine Harris as Ahmed “Ahm” Harris
- Evan Handler as Juggy Aaron
- Russell Hornsby as Sampson King
- A-F-R-O as D-Rome
- Method Man as Daryl Van Putten, Sr.
- Sinqua Walls as Terrance "Lil Ray" Baltimore
