= Jon Connor =

American rapper

- Born: Jon Kevin Freeman Jr. April 13, 1985 (age 41); Flint, Michigan, U.S.
- Genre: Hip hop
- Occupations: Rapper; record producer; songwriter
- Years active: 2005–present
- Labels: Aftermath; Interscope; All Varsity Music
- Website: twitter.com/JonConnorMusic

Jon Kevin Freeman Jr. (born April 13, 1985), better known by his stage name Jon Connor, is an American rapper and record producer. Connor has released various mixtapes and an album effort during his career including the Jay-Z inspired The Blue Album, and the Eminem inspired The People's Rapper LP. His debut studio album, Unconscious State was released in 2013. Shortly thereafter, he was signed to Dr. Dre's Aftermath Entertainment from 2013 to 2019, where he did not release an album. In 2015, he garnered notoriety for being featured on Dr. Dre's album Compton (2015) as well as The Game's album The Documentary 2.5 (2015).

== Early life ==
Jon Freeman Jr. was born on April 13, 1985, in Flint, Michigan, the son of Mahley and Jon Freeman Sr. His father, a musician turned Christian minister, served as his earliest musical influences. Jon Connor has stated that he grew up listening to Genesee County acts such as Top Authority, The Dayton Family and MC Breed.

He graduated from Flint Powers Catholic High School.

== Career ==
=== As a youth ===
Jon began songwriting at age ten. In middle school, he began selling his own mixtapes out of his backpack and from the trunk of his mother's car. At age 14, with the support of his mother, he founded his own independent record label, All Varsity Music. By 16, he had financed and created an in-house studio with money he earned through odd jobs in the neighborhood.

=== 2005–2010: Beginnings and early mixtapes ===
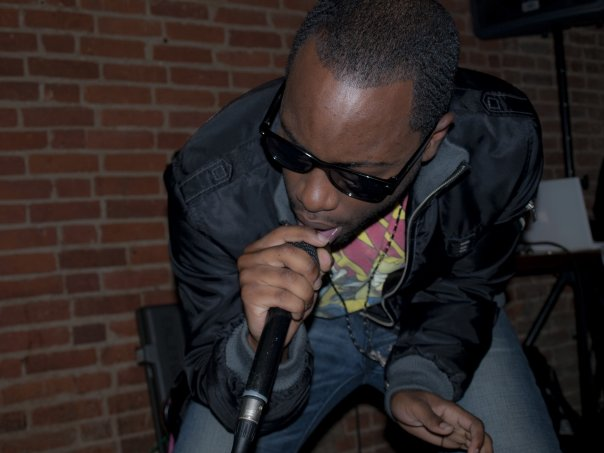
Connor performing at a concert

On January 1, 2005, Jon Connor released his first official mixtape, The Calling, Pt. 1: The Prequel. He followed that with another mixtape Everybody Hates Connor in 2006. Then he released his third mixtape, The Calling Pt. 2: The Second Coming in 2008. In 2009 he would link up with basketball player Mateen Cleaves, then later basketball player Jason Richardson, and Kendall "Young Sav" Freeman, vice president of rapper Rick Ross' Maybach Music Group record label to official start a record label. All who currently either run or co-own it. On September 29, 2010, Connor released his fourth mixtape, the Entourage-inspired, Jon Connor as Vinnie Chase: Season One. Jon Connor as Vinnie Chase: Season One was produced primarily by Connor and All Varsity Music producer Optiks. Rappers Saigon and Consequence would be featured on the remix to his song "The Message".

=== 2011: Salvation and Season 2 ===
On July 12, 2011, Jon Connor released Salvation, a collaboration album with producer Rob "Reef" Tewlow, who has produced for 50 Cent and Bad Meets Evil in the past. The album was met with positive reviews from music critics. William E. Ketchum III of HipHopDX stated, "Salvation undeniably showcases a sincerity and hunger that are tough to find in much of Hip Hop today. If Jon Connor continues to build on the skill set he already has, living up to his fictional namesake shouldn't be so far off." Later in 2011, Connor was in talks to sign with Def Jam Recordings, however that deal fell through. On December 12, 2011, Connor released his fifth mixtape, a sequel to Jon Connor as Vinnie Chase: Season One, titled Season 2. The mixtape featured guest appearances from GLC and Freeway. The mixtape garnered 130,000 downloads on Bandcamp within three months.

=== 2012: The "Best in the World" series and While You Were Sleeping ===
On February 14, 2012, Jon Connor released The Blue Album, a mixtape featuring him rapping over various Jay-Z instrumentals from the three Blueprint albums, The Blueprint, The Blueprint 2: The Gift & The Curse and The Blueprint 3. The mixtape title is also a play on words, referencing Blue City Club, a group he leads. The collective consists of Mickey Wallace, Caas Swift, Brandon Bars, Lia Mack and D. Wayne, who are all prominently featured on the mixtape. He told MTV that he wrote the whole mixtape in four days. Adam Fleischer of XXL gave the mixtape a positive review: "Lyrically, Connor is a clever artist that is able to weave words together and astonish without simply relying on punchlines.... Connor's lyrics, energy and microphone presence make every song sound fresh."

On April 13, 2012, Jon Connor released the second installment of his "Best in the World" mixtape series, The People's Rapper LP, which features him entirely rapping over classic Eminem instrumentals. The mixtape was executive produced and hosted by Don Cannon, also featuring guest appearances by his Blue City Club cohorts. The People's Rapper LP was met with positive reviews, with Andres Vasquez of HipHopDX deeming it "EP-worthy." Following the release of The People's Rapper LP, Connor toured the Midwest United States with rapper Big K.R.I.T.

On July 26, 2012, Connor released his eighth mixtape, While You Were Sleeping, featuring guest appearances by Bun B, Mistah Fab, GLC, Kid Ink, and Killa Kyleon among others. Unlike his previous two releases, While You Were Sleeping featured all original instrumentals produced by Connor and his production team, The World's Greatest Music, Optiks and Brix. Connor called While You Were Sleeping his most introspective work to date. Edwin Ortiz of HipHopDX gave the mixtape a positive review. During late 2012 to early 2013, Jon Connor toured with American rapper Xzibit, who eventually led him to meeting legendary producer Dr. Dre.

=== 2013–present: Unconscious State and signing to Aftermath Entertainment ===
In early 2013, Jon Connor revealed that he was working on various projects including, first, his debut studio album Unconscious State, then Unsung Heroes LP, a collaboration album with rapper Chris Webby, his second studio album and a collaboration album with Ski Beatz. On July 2, 2013, Jon Connor released Unconscious State under All Varsity Music. The album featured guest appearances by Danny Brown, Chris Webby, Freddie Gibbs, Royce da 5'9", Talib Kweli and Smoke DZA among others. Production was handled by Connor himself, Mr. Porter, Brix and Optiks among others. The album was supported by the singles, "Michigan Shit" featuring Royce da 5'9" and "Rise Up" featuring Talib Kweli. Upon its release the album peaked at number 35 on the US Billboard Top R&B/Hip-Hop Albums and number seven on the Billboard Heatseekers Albums charts.

On July 20, 2013, it was revealed that Jon Connor had recently been in the studio with Dr. Dre. Connor told MTV that the two immediately had chemistry in the studio, and after working with each other over the following months, Dre signed Connor to his record label Aftermath Entertainment, which is distributed by Interscope Records. At the end of his freestyle during a cypher at the taping of the 2013 BET Hip Hop Awards on September 29, Jon Connor revealed that he had signed to Dre's Aftermath Entertainment. He said he chose to announce then because, "I was thinking, 'How can I end this? How can I make this a moment?' This was my first time doing the cypher and I wanted to make it a moment. I ran it by Dre and he was like, 'Yo, that's dope.'" His freestyle during the 2013 BET Hip Hop Awards was well-praised, including being named the third best of the night, by XXL.

On March 18, 2014, Connor released another installment in his "Best in the World" series, the surprise mixtape The Late Registration of a College Dropout Who Had a Dark Twisted Fantasy of 808s and Heartbreak. Like his other Best in the World mixtapes, The Late Registration of a College Dropout Who Had a Dark Twisted Fantasy of 808s and Heartbreak was met with positive reviews from music critics. Jordan Lebeau of XXL gave a positive review as well, recognizing Connor's "own mastery of his voice, story, point of view and sense of humor." He released another mixtape, BestInTheWorld: A Tribute To The Notorious B.I.G. Vol 1, on April 14, 2014, which features Connor rapping over beats from The Notorious B.I.G. songs. Connor was also chosen for the 2014 XXL freshman class.

In January 2016, Connor released a song highlighting the Flint water crisis featuring singer Keke Palmer. In May 2019 Connor revealed that he was no longer signed to Aftermath / Interscope and he would be releasing new music independently soon.

From 2025-2026, Connor collaborated on multiple tracks with rapper/producer A-F-R-O, appearing on AFRODEEZEAK III, Trap Door and Trap Door 2.

== Musical style ==
His gritty lyricism has earned praise from rappers such as Busta Rhymes, The Game, Scarface, Nas, Rick Ross and fellow Michigan-native Big Sean.

== Discography ==
=== Studio albums ===
List of albums, with selected chart positions
Title	Album details	Peak chart positions		
Title	Album details	US R&B/HH	US Rap	US Heat.
Unconscious State	Release date: July 2, 2013; Label: All Varsity Music; Format: CD, digital download	35	24	7
SOS	Release date: April 27, 2020; Label: All Varsity Music; Format: CD, digital download	—	—	—
SOS Part II	Release date: April 15, 2022; Label: All Varsity Music; Format: Digital download	—	—	—
"—" denotes a title that did not chart, or was not released in that territory.

=== Collaboration album ===
Title	Album details
Salvation (with Rob "Reef" Tewlow)	Release date: July 12, 2011; Label: All Varsity Music; Format: Digital download

=== Mixtapes ===
- 2005: The Calling Pt. 1
- 2006: Everybody Hates Connor
- 2008: The Calling Pt. 2: The Second Coming
- 2010: Jon Connor As Vinnie Chase: Season 1
- 2011: Season 2
- 2012: Best in The World: The Blue Album
- 2012: Best In The World: The People's Rapper LP
- 2012: While You Were Sleeping
- 2014: BestInTheWorld: The Late Registration of a College Dropout Who Had a Dark Twisted Fantasy of 808s and Heartbreak
- 2014: BestInTheWorld: A Tribute To The Notorious B.I.G. Vol. 1
- 2021 Best In The World: Delirium
- 2022 Best In The World: The N Tape

=== Singles ===
==== As lead artist ====
List of singles as lead performer, showing year released, album name, and label
Title	Year	Album
"High"	2011	Non-album singles
"Pull the Plug" (featuring Statik Selektah)	2013	Non-album singles
"Fresh Water For Flint" (featuring Keke Palmer)	2016	Non-album singles
"I’m Back" (featuring Dr. Dre)	2018	Non-album singles
"The Pain"	2020	Non-album singles
"Priceless"	2020	Non-album singles
"Q Love"	2020	Non-album singles
"Wild in the Streets" (with Chris Webby)	2020	Non-album singles
"Angels & Demons"" (with Locksmith)	2021	Non-album singles

=== Guest appearances ===
- DJ Kay Slay – "Redemption" (ft.Trae Tha Truth, Tone Trump, Papoose) (2011)
- Willie the Kid – "One Time" (2011)
- DJ Kay Slay – "Wanna Be Right" (ft. JR Writer, Reek da Villian, Ja Millz) (2011)
- Chi Hoover – "Shooter Reloaded" (ft. June Summers, Waka Flocka) (2011)
- Face tha Music – "Go"(Remix) (ft. Neako, Vado) (2011)
- Rochelle Jordan – "Sing" (2011)
- Face tha Music – "Presistance" (2011)
- DJ Kay Slay – "War" (ft. Vado) (2011)
- Statik Selektah – "Samuel L Jackson" (ft. XV, The Kid Daytona) (2011)
- Donny Goines – "Barbarians" (ft. Just Blaze, Laws) (2011)
- Young Gliss- "No One Can Stop Us Now" (ft. Prodigy, Killer Mike, Lo Keys, Just Shawn) The Glimmer EP (2012)
- Russel W. Howard – "Beautiful Distraction" (ft. Joe Gates) Beautiful Distraction (2012)
- iMayday! – "TNT"(Remix) (ft. Black Thought, DJ Khaled, Jay Rock, Stevie Stone) (2012)
- Sean Brown – "Hip Hop Sh*t" Chapter 86: The Blind Art Collector (2012)
- Reks – "Shotgun" (ft. Venessa Renee) Rebelutionary (2012)
- Jarren Benton – "Billion Bucks" (ft. Rittz) (2012)
- Boola – "Starting 5" (ft. Maffew Ragazino, Mickey Factz, Reek da Villian) No Better Time Than The Present (2012)
- DJ Kay Slay – "Victorious" (ft. Papoose, Mysonne) (2012)
- Willie the Kid – "Marina" Aquamarine (2012)
- Amir Obe – "Ultimatum" (2012)
- The Kid Daytona – "Copy Copy" (2012)
- Chris Co – "Straight Up" (ft. Elzhi) (2012)
- Chris Webby – "Whatever I Like" Bars On Me (2012)
- Statik Selektah – "Pull The Plug" (ft. J.F.K.) Age Open Season (2012)
- DJ Kay Slay – "No Way Out" (ft. Cassidy, Joell Ortiz) Grown Man Hip Hop Pt. 2 (2012)
- DJ Seuss.One – "Triumph" (2013)
- Talib Kweli – "Makes No Sense" (ft. Freddie Gibbs) (2013)
- Tito Lopez – "Tryna Get On" Year of the Underdog (2013)
- Demrick – "Bars" (ft. Rass Kass) (2013)
- Serial Killers – "Laugh Now" Serial Killers Vol. 1 (2013)
- Kuniva – "Michiganish" (ft. Boldy James, Guilty Simpson) (2013)
- Peter Jackson – "I don't Give A Fuck 3.0" (ft. Freddie Gibbs, SwizZz, Aasim, Consequence) (2013)
- Suspect – "Reflections" (2014)
- KaliRaps – "Make It Seem Easy" Mr. Misunderstood (2014)
- Statik Selektah – "Alarm Clock" (ft. Ab Soul, Logic) What Goes Around (2014)
- Kap Kallous — "Lonely Famous" (ft. Preauxx) (2014)
- Rah Digga – "Storm Comin"(Remix) (ft. Chuck D) (2014)
- DJ Kay Slay – "Team Work" (ft. Memphis Bleek, Freeway, Loaded Lux) The Original Man (2014)
- Chris Webby – "You Don't Really Want It" (ft. Snow Tha Product) The Check Up (2014)
- Chris Webby – "World On Fire" (ft. Skrizzly Adams) Chemically Imbalanced (2014)
- DJ EFN – "Warrior" (ft. David Banner, Sizzla, N.O.R.E.) Another Time (2015)
- DJ Kay Slay – "Undefeated" (ft. Ransom, Dave East) The Industry Purge (2015)
- Jarren Benton – "Killin My Soul" (ft. Hopsin) Slow Motion (2015)
- The Game – "Moment Of Violence" (ft. King Mez, Jt) The Documentary 2.5 (2015)
- Dr. Dre – "One Shot One Kill" – (ft. Snoop Dogg) Compton: A Soundtrack By Dr. Dre (2015)
- DJ Paul – "Run Em Off" (ft. OG Maco, Compton Menace) Mafia 4 Life (2016)
- DJ Paul – "Get Away" (ft. Yelawolf) Mafia 4 Life (2016)
- DJ Paul – "Trying To Get It" (ft. Dave East) Underground Vol.17 for da Summa (2017)
- Dizzy Wright – "Apart of the Plan" State Of Mind 2 (2017)
- DJ Kay Slay – "This Is My Culture" (ft. Ransom, Papoose, Locksmith) The Big Brother (2017)
- Page Kennedy – "Where i'm from" (ft. Fred the Godson, Jad, 3D Na'Tee) Straight Bars 2 (2018)
- Chris Webby – "HipHop Legend" (ft. JAG) Next Wednesday (2018)
- DJ Kay Slay – "Back to the Bars" (ft. Ninoman, Vado, Mysonne, Fred The Godson, Locksmith, Joell Ortiz) Hip-Hop Frontline (2019)
- DJ Kay Slay — "Back to the Bars Pt. 2" (ft. Ninoman, RJ Payne, Sauce Money, Sheek Louch, Styles P, Vado) Living Legend (2020)
- DJ Kay Slay — "It's A Brand New Day" (ft. Big K.R.I.T., Reek da Villian, Tre Williams) Living Legend (2020)
- Psalm One — "Unfuckwitable" Before They Stop Us (2020)
- Chris Webby — "Wild in the Streets" (2020)
- Busty and the Bass – "Go So Far" (ft. Illa J) Eddie (2020)
- DJ Kay Slay — "WTF You Thought" (ft. AZ, DJ Paul, Merkules, Papoose, Saigon, Tony Yayo) Accolades (2021)
- A-F-R-O - "Tarantino" (feat. inDJnous) AFRODEEZEAK III (2025)
- A-F-R-O - "Junkyard Dawgz" (feat. EKYM1536, H3ro, Ace of Chosen Kingz) Trap Door (2025)
- A-F-R-O - "Captain Now" (feat. Blu, MZ1, YaH-Ra, Madd Illz, Eksale, Felcon, Rod) Trap Door 2 (2026)
