= Unconscious State =

Studio album by Jon Connor
- Released: July 2, 2013
- Recorded: 2013
- Genre: Hip hop
- Label: All Varsity Music
- Producer: Jon Connor (also exec.); Mr. Porter; Brix; K. Wills; Neo Tempus; Optiks

Unconscious State is the debut studio album by American rapper Jon Connor. The album was released on July 2, 2013 by Connor's All Varsity Music. In early 2013, Jon Connor revealed that he was working on various projects including, his debut studio album Unconscious State along with his second studio album. The album featured guest appearances by Danny Brown, Chris Webby, Freddie Gibbs, Royce da 5'9", Talib Kweli, Willie the Kid and Smoke DZA among others. Production was handled by Connor himself, Mr. Porter, Brix and Optiks among others. Upon its release the album peaked at number 35 on the US Billboard Top R&B/Hip-Hop Albums and number seven on the Billboard Heatseekers Albums charts.

== Critical reception ==
Professional ratings
Review scores
Source	Rating
AllHipHop	8.8/10
HipHopDX	3.5/5 stars
Laut.de	3/5 stars

Unconscious State was met with critical acclaim from music critics. Shad of AllHipHop stated, "Overall, this is a great addition to Jon Connor’s already impressive catalogue of previous material. It’s only a matter of time before Unconscious State propels Jon Connor further into the Hip-Hop audience’s consciousness than he has ever been before." XXL said, "By this point, Connor was known as one of the most lyrical MCs in the game, but Unconscious State—with its features from Royce, Kweli, Freddie Gibbs, Danny Brown and Smoke DZA, to name just a few—proved that he could stand his ground amongst his peers in the game. Connor may have made his name through his mixtapes—calling himself The People's Rapper, he's been known to cater to his fanbase but consistently delivering top-notch music for free—but Unconscious State established him as a rapper with more than just technical ability on his side." Jesse Fairfax of HipHopDX said, "Unconscious State is a change of pace from Jon Connor, reflecting both growth and regression. At times he sacrifices artistry in the chase for recognition."

== Track listing ==
No.	Title	Producer(s)	Length
1.	"Unconscious State Prelude"	Jon Connor	2:04
2.	"Unconscious State"	Block Symfany	1:23
3.	"Take the World" (featuring Lia Mack, Lyric Da Queen and Jenna Noelle)	Jon Connor	3:40
4.	"Connor 25:17"	AP	3:11
5.	"The Sarah Song (Tour Life The Sequel)"	Jon Connor	3:18
6.	"Michigan Shit" (featuring Royce da 5'9")	Brix	3:08
7.	"Over & Over"	Jon Connor	3:18
8.	"F'N Right" (featuring Freddie Gibbs)	K. Wills	4:33
9.	"When I Was Young" (featuring Chris Webby and Smoke DZA)	Neo Tempus	3:44
10.	"Under Oath"	Jon Connor	4:08
11.	"In My Sleep" (featuring Tito Lopez and Chelsea Blare)	Jon Connor	4:09
12.	"2 Week Notice"	Jon Connor	3:50
13.	"The Porn Song" (featuring D.Wayne and Caas Swift)	Jon Connor	4:17
14.	"Let Us Pray" (featuring Willie the Kid and 40 Da Great)	K. Wills	3:56
15.	"Rise Up" (featuring Talib Kweli)	Optiks	3:47
16.	"This Time" (featuring Kevin George, Craig Owens, Yobi and Jenna Noelle)	Jon Connor	4:12
17.	"Judge & Jury"	Jon Connor	3:07
18.	"My Life" (featuring Justin Daye and Caas Swift)	Block Symfany	3:58
19.	"Vodka & Weed" (featuring Danny Brown)	Block Symfany	3:06
20.	"Running Away" (featuring Jenna Noelle)	Optiks	4:30
21.	"American Pie" (featuring Lia Mack)	Jon Connor	3:58
22.	"Outro"	Jon Connor	2:13

== Charts ==
Chart (2013)	Peak position
US Top R&B/Hip-Hop Albums (Billboard)	35
