= A-F-R-O =

American rapper, producer and actor

A-F-R-O aka FRO Thizzle
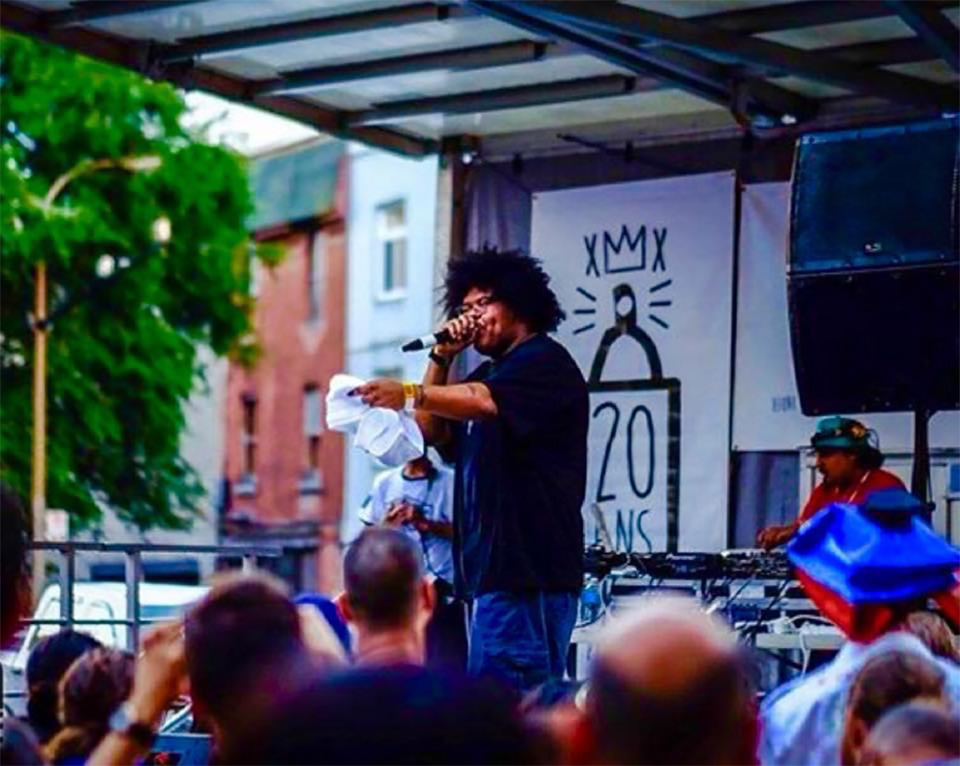
- A-F-R-O in 2018
- Born: James Dean Santiago-Gutierrez; August 29, 1997 (age 29); Gardena, California
- Other names: All Flows Reach Out, FRO Thizzle, Grandmaster FRO
- Occupations: Rapper, actor, producer, writer
- Years active: 2014-
- Notable work: The Breaks (2016), A-F-R-O POLO (2016)
- Height: 6'3
- Website: frothizzle.com

James Gutierrez (born August 29, 1997), known professionally as A-F-R-O, All Flows Reach Out, or FRO Thizzle, is an American rapper, actor, record producer, and songwriter. He first gained widespread recognition in 2014 after he attracted the attention of rapper R.A. the Rugged Man, who introduced him to a broader audience.

Known for his technical lyricism, multisyllabic rhyme schemes, and influences from the golden age of hip hop, A-F-R-O has collaborated with numerous established artists and producers throughout his career.

Following his early releases, A-F-R-O established himself as an independent recording artist, releasing solo and collaborative projects while also producing his own music. His work has featured collaborations with Marco Polo, Diamond D, Jon Connor, Blu, and MotionPlus, among others.

In addition to his music career, A-F-R-O has pursued work in film as an actor. His creative work spans music, film, and digital media, reflecting a multidisciplinary approach to storytelling and independent production.

== Early life ==
James Dean Santiago-Gutierrez was born in Gardena, California. He is Black and Mexican. After living in foster homes, Gutierrez was adopted at the age of 5. He attended middle and high school in Orange County, California.

Gutierrez vowed to become an emcee after discovering Microphone Fiend by Eric B. and Rakim at the age of 9.

== Music career ==
Gutierrez adopted the stage name A-F-R-O, an initialism for All Flows Reach Out, at age 13. When he turned 15, he bought his first set of musical equipment with the help of his mother and began to record his own music, mainly over YouTube instrumentals.

=== 2014-2015: First project, meeting R.A. the Rugged Man, The Queen Latifah Show ===
On June 12, 2014, A-F-R-O released his first EP titled Modest World, which was produced by Pulse Reaction. The EP has a sorrowful tone, but still contains the heavy lyricism that made A-F-R-O well known.

A-F-R-O was discovered by his hip-hop mentor, R.A. the Rugged Man in 2014 at the age of 17 after entering his Definition Of A Rap Flow competition. After their first meeting, R.A. recorded two videos of A-F-R-O freestyling. Both gathered millions of views on YouTube. They soon collaborated on numerous occasions, and toured together across the world.

In October 2014, A-F-R-O made an appearance on The Queen Latifah Show, performing a live freestyle based on random items pulled out of a box.

=== 2016: The Tonight Show Starring Jimmy Fallon, A-F-R-O POLO ===
In 2016, Honda released a special titled Honda Uncharted. It was a 2015-2017 digital video series produced by Honda in partnership with Woven Digital (Uproxx) for the Honda Stage platform. The series focused on documenting the journeys of emerging musicians and artists, targeting younger audiences through storytelling. A-F-R-O was one of the subjects, and his episode received a Clio Award for 2016 Gold Winner.

On June 16, 2016, A-F-R-O performed a live freestyle on The Tonight Show Starring Jimmy Fallon.

A-F-R-O collaborated with EDM producer NGHTMRE on two songs in 2016, one of which was titled Stronger. The accompanying music video, directed by Colin Hanks, showcases the track being recorded straight to vinyl and backed with a live band.

July 2016 saw the release of the A-F-R-O POLO EP, a collaboration between A-F-R-O and producer Marco Polo, with contributions from Pharoahe Monch and Eamon. The project was born after R.A. the Rugged Man brought A-F-R-O to the producer's studio and encouraged him to work with the rapper. The EP has close to 10,000,000 streams.

A-F-R-O recorded multiple songs with his favorite producer DJ Premier for a collaborative project in 2015, but it remains unreleased, as of 2026. However, they did work on two separate songs for A-F-R-O's character D-Rome in The Breaks.

=== 2017-2019: "Freedom Form Flowing" ===
In 2017, Gift of Gab reached out to R.A. to feature both him and A-F-R-O on a song called Freedom Form Flowing. A-F-R-O, being a big fan of Blackalicious, was more than ecstatic to collaborate with one of his favorite emcees.

The music video was released September 7, 2018, and has reached over 15,000,000 views on YouTube.

A-F-R-O was featured on Novel's single "Young Monster" in 2019, which appeared on Power Book II: Ghost and BET's Stopwatch America.

In May 2019, A-F-R-O appeared on Diamond D's song Hold Up, which also features Twista.

=== 2020-2022: All My Heroes are Dead, Overdrive appearance ===
On April 17, 2020, A-F-R-O was featured on R.A. the Rugged Man's album All My Heroes Are Dead. The song "Gotta Be Dope" was given rave reviews, and the music video has reached over 2 million views. On April 27, he appeared on Jon Connor's album, SOS.

In 2021, Hi-Rez recruited A-F-R-O on the highly acclaimed song Overdrive, which also features Twista, Tech N9ne, Bizzy Bone, Joell Ortiz, & KRSNA. He was later featured on Diamond D & Talib Kweli's single, Far Out Bar Out.

A-F-R-O made a guest appearance on Fortnite's song Lil Whip (Mmm!) in 2022.

=== 2023: Production career, 2nd EP AFRODEEZEAK ===
Starting 2023, A-F-R-O focused on producing his own projects, and also for numerous artists including MotionPlus, 60 East, EKYM1536, Pulse Reaction, Elena Charis, MZ1, and Emsee Prospekt.

On August 28, 2023, A-F-R-O released his 2nd solo EP and the first entry to his self-produced AFRODEEZEAK trilogy.

=== 2024: Multiple releases, Posse Part 3 ===
A-F-R-O released his 3rd solo EP New Colonel in Town on January 26, 2024. The EP has a comical take on KFC and Colonel Sanders.

He later released his 4th solo EP The Drawing Board on May 10, and his 5th solo EP AFRODEEZEAK 2 on September 13.

On December 27, A-F-R-O arranged a song titled "Posse Part 3," which features 80 emcees on a single track. Psycho Les, Blu, Jon Connor, Myka 9, and Reverie are among the large roster. The video was nominated for Best Music Video at IndieX Film Festival.'

=== 2025: Trap Door compilation album ===
A-F-R-O released his 6th solo EP Crimson Fury on June 13, 2025. This conceptual EP tells a story about a man named Archie, who gets sent to prison after killing the men who murdered his best friend.

On September 26, A-F-R-O released his 7th solo EP AFRODEEZEAK 3, closing out his first trilogy. The third single King ov da Throne features Slug. On December 12, he released his 8th solo EP No More Patience, which includes a single that was produced by Erick Sermon, titled U Ain't.

A-F-R-O released a self-produced compilation full-length album, Trap Door, on December 26. Trap Door was in development for 11 years. The album features appearances from Reks, Termanology, Blu, Jon Connor, and actor/comedian Will Sasso.

=== 2026: Multiple releases, Trap Door 2 ===
On May 4, 2026, A-F-R-O released an EP titled A-F-R-O DILLA, with all proceeds going to the J Dilla / James Dewitt Yancey Foundation.

His 9th solo EP titled Blood Rain was released on May 22, 2026.

On June 1, 2026, A-F-R-O and MotionPlus announced a collaborative album titled Frequencies. The front cover and tracklist were revealed on their Instagram profiles on June 4th. On June 26, A-F-R-O and MotionPlus released Frequencies on all platforms, and Bandcamp for direct support.

On July 24, 2026, A-F-R-O revealed the front cover, track list, and release date for Trap Door 2. On July 25, 2026, the first single "Abandon Ship," was released. On August 7, A-F-R-O released the second single, "Play on Wordz," featuring Bishop Lamont, Wordsworth, and Terror Van Poo. A music video for "Play on Wordz" was later released on August 21st.

On August 28, 2026, A-F-R-O released Trap Door 2 on digital platforms.

As of 2026, notable emcees who have appeared on A-F-R-O's production include Slug, Ras Kass, Bishop Lamont, Eligh, Wordsworth, Rock of Heltah Skeltah, Tek of Smif-N-Wessun, Blaq Poet, Ruste Juxx, 4-IZE, and K.A.A.N.

A-F-R-O released a collaborative album with UK Producer Chrome Waves in October 2026 called 'Chrome Sweet Chrome'. The album is available on streaming platforms and Bandcamp for direct support.

== Acting and television career ==
=== 2016-2022: First role, The Breaks ===
A-F-R-O appeared in a scene for the film Good Time, but it was ultimately left in the cutting room. After feeling discouraged, A-F-R-O landed his first acting gig in 2016 on The Breaks, a VH1 television drama film about 90's hip-hop, and returned to play the same character in three episodes of the TV series spin-off. In 2022, A-F-R-O appeared as Moo in the horror-comedy film Bitch Ass, which also includes the late Tony Todd.

=== Movie review career ===
On March 4, 2022, A-F-R-O started a movie review channel and podcast on YouTube titled FRO Thizzle Reviews.

== Critical reception ==
=== A-F-R-O POLO ===
Of his collaboration with Marco Polo on the song Long Time Coming, Vibe magazine wrote "A -F-R-O sounds off with takes his intermediate rhyming skills to a whole new level over Polo's piano minor chords, distorted vocals, and hard drums." Acclaim magazine said of the song Joe Jackson "This is easily the best song on the EP, with a laid-back tempo that gives dude room to breathe." Subjective Sounds wrote "From a sonic perspective, A-F-R-O Polo is magnificent with a soundstage that grows as you increase the volume and doesn't distort. The separation between elements is also superb.... A-F-R-O Polo is incredibly dynamic".

=== Other ===
The Current wrote "hip-hop has changed so vastly... the old school sound seems to have been completely snuffed out. That is, until the extremely talented 18-year-old rapper A-F-R-O (All Flows Reach Out) came onto the scene... this very talented individual has not only been given the opportunity to share his music, but also brought old school back".

Of Fro's performance in Milwaukee in 2016, the Milwaukee Courier wrote: "Although A-F-R-O may look like a big teddy bear with an even bigger Afro, his bassy voice and ability to rhyme extremely complex words syllable-by-syllable could be considered rap genius."

== Influences and style ==
=== Lyrical style ===
A-F-R-O has named Sean Price, MF Doom, R.A. the Rugged Man, GZA, Pharoahe Monch, Rakim, Kool G Rap, Chip-Fu, and Twista as his lyrical influences on rhyme schemes, content, and speed.

=== Production style ===
A-F-R-O names DJ Premier as his favorite producer of all time, and is majorly influenced by his works. He also holds Pete Rock, J Dilla, Madlib, Erick Sermon, and RZA in high regards.

== Filmography ==
=== Film ===
Year	Title	Role	Notes
2017	Good Time	Credit only	Film
2021	Bad Deal	Moses	Short film
2022	Bitch Ass	Moo	Film
2024	My Story	Thug	Short film
2024	Huggin' Molly	Michael - Missing Person	Film

=== Television ===
Year	Title	Role	Notes
2016	The Breaks	D-Rome	Television film
2017	The Breaks	D-Rome	S1:02, S1:03, S1:04

== Discography ==
=== Studio albums ===
The Book of James
- Released: TBA
- Label: TBA

=== Solo EPs ===
Modest World
- Released: June 12, 2014 (Original release) / January 6, 2015 (Re-release)
- Label: Self-released
AFRODEEZEAK
- Released: August 28, 2023
- Label: FRO Thizzle Productions
- Singles: "Talk ov da Town"
New Colonel in Town
- Released: January 26, 2024
- Label: FRO Thizzle Productions
The Drawing Board
- Released: May 10, 2024
- Label: FRO Thizzle Productions
- Singles: "Next 2 Shine", "Wing Chun"
AFRODEEZEAK 2
- Released: September 13, 2024
- Label: FRO Thizzle Productions
- Singles: "Tarantino (feat. Jon Connor & inDJnous)"
Crimson Fury
- Released: May 30, 2025 (Direct support) / June 13, 2025 (Streaming platforms)
- Label: FRO Thizzle Productions
AFRODEEZEAK 3
- Released: September 26, 2025
- Label: FRO Thizzle Productions
- Singles: "OK", "King ov da Throne (feat. Slug)", Curious"
No More Patience
- Released: December 12, 2025
- Label: FRO Thizzle Productions
- Singles: "U Ain't", "NBNA", "Who's Dat (feat. DJ City Rich)"
Blood Rain
- Released: May 22, 2026
- Label: FRO Thizzle Productions

=== Collab albums ===
The Bad and the Ugly with Stu Bangas
- Released: October 31, 2024
- Label: Brutal Music
- Singles: "Lost Souls", "From Dusk Til Dawn (feat. Lil' Dee)"
At the Sideshow 2: Art House with 60 East
- Released: November 17, 2025
- Label: Purty Ugly
- Singles: "The Program", "Feeding Frenzy", "Guilty Conscience", "Never Fall (feat. RHYMESTYLETROOP)"
The Bad and the Ugly (Chapter 2) with Stu Bangas
- Released: November 28, 2025
- Label: Brutal Music
- Singles: "Mastermind (feat. Wordsworth)", "Glistening"
Frequencies (A-F-R-O and MotionPlus album)
- Released: June 26, 2026
- Label: FRO Thizzle Productions / SOLFEEDER
Stu Bangas, Wordsworth, & A-F-R-O (LP)
- Released: TBA
- Label: Brutal Music

=== Collab EPs ===
A-F-R-O POLO with Marco Polo
- Released: July 15, 2016
- Label: Duck Down Records
- Singles: "Long Time Comin'"
At the Sideshow with 60 East
- Released: May 23, 2023
- Label: Purty Ugly
- Singles: "Cali Ozone (feat. Ras Kass)"
FROMAGE with Grey Mouse Beats
- Released: November 21, 2025
- Label: Grey Mouse Beats
A-F-R-O DILLA
- Released: May 4, 2026 (Direct support)
- Label: J Dilla / James Dewitt Yancey Foundation
Couch Potatoez with DudeSirius
- Released: TBA
- Label: FRO Thizzle Productions

=== Compilation albums ===
Trap Door
- Released: December 26, 2025
- Label: FRO Thizzle Productions
- Singles: "Riddle 2 Dribble", "Junkyard Dawgz," "Da Buck Stops", "Stop Frontin''"
Trap Door 2
- Release date: August 28, 2026
- Label: FRO Thizzle Productions
- Singles: "Abandon Ship," "Play on Wordz," "Barb Wire," "Tony Hawk"
The Iron Ten
- Release date: November 13, 2026
- Label: FRO Thizzle Productions
- Singles: "C4", "Mystery Machine"

=== Mixtapes ===
A-F-R-O DOOM
- Released: August 28, 2014
- Label: Self-released
Tales From the Basement
- Released: November 19, 2015
- Label: Nature Sounds

=== Other projects that A-F-R-O completely produced ===
Emsee Prospekt: Mind Over Matter (LP)
- Released: July 18, 2024
- Label: FRO Thizzle Productions/Deep Mindset Records
- Singles: "Contakt Rap", "Latin Lingo (feat. Ill Conscious & A-F-R-O)"
MotionPlus: FOCUS (LP)
- Released: January 31, 2025
- Label: FRO Thizzle Productions
- Singles: "Lyrical Whatever (feat. A-F-R-O)", "S.O.S. (Souls for Sale)", "Time"
MZ1: Razor Blades (LP)
- Released: February 11, 2025
- Label: FRO Thizzle Productions
- Singles: "Smoke in the Air (feat. A-F-R-O)"
Golden Buddha: Buddha Paymilia (EP)
- Released: March 21, 2025
- Label: FRO Thizzle Productions
Felcon: Thinking (EP)
- Released: May 16, 2025
- Label: FRO Thizzle Productions
UcexHano: Island Born, Cali Raised (LP)
- Released: July 2, 2025
- Label: FRO Thizzle Productions
Elena Charis (LP)
- Released: October 3, 2025
- Label: FRO Thizzle Productions
- Singles: "Cloud 9", "Severance", "The Thinker", "Samurai's Daughter", "The Hills"
MotionPlus: Antiquity (LP)
- Released: December 5, 2025
- Label: FRO Thizzle Productions/SOLFEEDER
- Singles: "Ill Principals (feat. StrataG)", "Some Pictures Ain't Clear"
Emsee Prospekt: Mind Over Matter Part 2 (LP)
- Released: July 2026
- Label: FRO Thizzle Productions/Deep Mindset Records
Rash Reed: Fresh Paint (EP)
- Released: October 29, 2026
- Label: FRO Thizzle Productions
- Singles: "Ripstick Exorcism"
Elena Charis Untitled Project (LP)
- Released: TBA
- Label: FRO Thizzle Productions
MZ1: Beneath the Razor (LP)
- Released: TBA
- Label: FRO Thizzle Productions
Pulse Reaction: Maximum Toxin (LP)
- Released: TBA
- Label: FRO Thizzle Productions
- Singles: "On da Scene (feat. A-F-R-O)"
Ogar Burl Untitled Project (EP)
- Released: TBA
- Label: TBA
DJ E-DuB Untitled Project (LP)
- Released: TBA
- Label: TBA

=== Instrumental projects ===
Indonesia
- Released: December 1, 2023
- Label: FRO Thizzle Productions
El Maestro
- Released: December 10, 2024
- Label: FRO Thizzle Productions
GUMBO
- Released: August 17, 2025
- Label: FRO Thizzle Productions
Rewind Dat
- Released: April 15, 2026 (Direct support) / April 16, 2026 (Streaming platforms)
- Label: FRO Thizzle Productions

== Featured on ==
- Jedi Mind Tricks - The Thief and the Fallen (2015)
- NGHTMARE - Stronger (2016)
- Wax Tailor - By Any Beats Necessary (2016)
- Chinese Man - Shikantaza (2017)
- Gift of Gab - Rejoice! Rappers Are Rapping Again! (2018)
- Diamond D - The Diam Piece 2 (2019)
- Novel - "Young Monster" (2019)
- R.A. the Rugged Man - All My Heroes Are Dead (2020)
- L'Orange & Solemn Brigham - Marlowe 2 (2020)
- Jon Connor - SOS (2020)
- Diamond D & Talib Kweli - "Far Out, Bar Out" (2021)
- Hi-Rez - "Overdrive" (alongside Twista, Tech N9ne, Bizzy Bone, Joell Ortiz, & KRSNA) [2021]
- K.A.A.N. - KAIZEN (2021)
- Fortnite - "Lil’ Whip (Mmm!)" (2022)
- Freedom Fry - "Mr. Nobody" (2022)
- Artifacts & Buckwild - No Expiration Date (2022)
- Emsee Prospekt & Big Duke - "3 Kingz" (2025)
- 4-IZE - All Seeing IZE On Me (2025)
- Stu Bangas & Horror City - The Phantom of the Operap (2025)
- Blu & Myka 9 - God Takes Care of Babies & Fools (2025)

== Full production list ==
List of songs produced by A-F-R-O, with performing artists, showing year released and album name
Title	Year	Performer(s)	Album
"IDK"	2021	A-F-R-O, Tek, Voice Watkins	IDK - Single
"Alphabetical Algorithm" (co-produced with SuperBrownBum)	2022	A-F-R-O	Alphabetical Algorithm - Single
"FRO's In Demand"	2023	A-F-R-O	FRO's In Demand - Single
"Talk ov da Town"	2023	A-F-R-O	AFRODEEZEAK (EP)
"Night at da Rink"	2023	A-F-R-O	AFRODEEZEAK (EP)
"Journeymen"	2023	A-F-R-O & 60 East	At the Sideshow (EP)
"Funny How?"	2023	A-F-R-O & 60 East	At the Sideshow (EP)
"Americxn Ninjas"	2023	A-F-R-O & 60 East	At the Sideshow (EP)
"Czech"	2023	A-F-R-O & 60 East	At the Sideshow (EP)
"Cali Ozone" (feat. Ras Kass)	2023	A-F-R-O & 60 East	At the Sideshow (EP)
"Colonel's Recipe (Intro)"	2024	A-F-R-O	New Colonel in Town (EP)
"Back in da Game"	2024	A-F-R-O	New Colonel in Town (EP)
"Cholesterol None"	2024	A-F-R-O	New Colonel in Town (EP)
"The Drawing Board (Intro)"	2024	A-F-R-O	The Drawing Board (EP)
"Next 2 Shine"	2024	A-F-R-O	The Drawing Board (EP)
"Wing Chun"	2024	A-F-R-O	The Drawing Board (EP)
"Gone 4 a Second"	2024	A-F-R-O	The Drawing Board (EP)
"Behead the Beat"	2024	A-F-R-O	The Drawing Board (EP)
"Old Tyme's Sake"	2024	A-F-R-O	The Drawing Board (EP)
"Redemption"	2024	A-F-R-O	The Drawing Board (EP)
"AFRODEEZEAK 2 (Intro)"	2024	A-F-R-O	AFRODEEZEAK 2 (EP)
"Mack a Docious"	2024	A-F-R-O	AFRODEEZEAK 2 (EP)
"Da Mayor"	2024	A-F-R-O	AFRODEEZEAK 2 (EP)
"Worldwide!"	2024	A-F-R-O	AFRODEEZEAK 2 (EP)
"Alley Oop!" (feat. 4-IZE)	2024	A-F-R-O	AFRODEEZEAK 2 (EP)
"Across the Universe" (feat. Blu, 60 East, & Elena Charis)	2024	A-F-R-O	AFRODEEZEAK 2 (EP)
"Tarantino" (feat. Jon Connor & inDJnous)	2024	A-F-R-O	AFRODEEZEAK 2 (EP)
"4 tha Culture" (feat. EKYM1536, SuperBrownBum, & DJ E-DuB)	2024	A-F-R-O	AFRODEEZEAK 2 (EP)
"King's Grace"	2024	MotionPlus	King's Grace - Single
"INTRO"	2024	Emsee Prospekt	MIND OVER MATTER
"P EXERTZ"	2024	Emsee Prospekt	MIND OVER MATTER
"1AM"	2024	Emsee Prospekt	MIND OVER MATTER
"LATIN LINGO" (feat. A-F-R-O & Ill Conscious)	2024	Emsee Prospekt	MIND OVER MATTER
"CONTAKT RAP"	2024	Emsee Prospekt	MIND OVER MATTER
"RECUERDOZ!"	2024	Emsee Prospekt	MIND OVER MATTER
"FACES OF BOOM BAP" (feat. Big Ase)	2024	Emsee Prospekt	MIND OVER MATTER
"MICROPHONE HEART"	2024	Emsee Prospekt	MIND OVER MATTER
"THE POET OR THE PSYCHO"	2024	Emsee Prospekt	MIND OVER MATTER
"REMAIN ALERT!" (feat. Ruste Juxx)	2024	Emsee Prospekt	MIND OVER MATTER
"UNBROKEN DREAMZ	2024	Emsee Prospekt	MIND OVER MATTER
"A LIFETIME IN PARADISE (R.I.P. BENJAMIN JR.)"	2024	Emsee Prospekt	MIND OVER MATTER
WHAT LIFE IS (R.I.P. BENJAMIN SR.)"	2024	Emsee Prospekt	MIND OVER MATTER
"OUTRO"	2024	Emsee Prospekt	MIND OVER MATTER
"Intro"	2025	MotionPlus	FOCUS
"Wake Up"	2025	MotionPlus	FOCUS
"Time"	2025	MotionPlus	FOCUS
"Survival Guide"	2025	MotionPlus	FOCUS
"Heights"	2025	MotionPlus	FOCUS
"Beware of the Villains"	2025	MotionPlus	FOCUS
"Home Ain't a Home"	2025	MotionPlus	FOCUS
"Find" (feat. Tevo Jordan & Antonia Marquee)	2025	MotionPlus	FOCUS
"Lyrical Whatever" (feat. A-F-R-O)	2025	MotionPlus	FOCUS
"S.O.S. (Souls on Sale)"	2025	MotionPlus	FOCUS
"It's a Blessing"	2025	MotionPlus	FOCUS
"Ill Principals" (feat. StrataG)	2025	MotionPlus	Antiquity
"State of Dreamin'"	2025	MotionPlus	Antiquity
"Paralyzation"	2025	MotionPlus	Antiquity
"Eighties"	2025	MotionPlus	Antiquity
"Some Pictures Ain't Clear"	2025	MotionPlus	Antiquity
"Hearts & Homes" (feat. m1L)	2025	MotionPlus	Antiquity
"Silver Lining"	2025	MotionPlus	Antiquity
"Check My Credentials"	2025	MotionPlus	Antiquity
"RazorBlades"	2025	MZ1	Razor Blades
"Smoke in the Air" (feat. A-F-R-O)	2025	MZ1	Razor Blades
"Roll Call"	2025	MZ1	Razor Blades
"Greetings"	2025	MZ1	Razor Blades
"Found the Body"	2025	MZ1	Razor Blades
"Overton Window"	2025	MZ1	Razor Blades
"Cypherzone"	2025	MZ1	Razor Blades
"All Around Me"	2025	MZ1	Razor Blades
"GUMALAW"	2025	Golden Buddha	Buddha Paymilia (EP)
"MAD MASTERS" (feat. A-F-R-O & Emsee Prospekt)	2025	Golden Buddha	Buddha Paymilia (EP)
"TELEKINESIS"	2025	Golden Buddha	Buddha Paymilia (EP)
"RONIN" (feat. A-F-R-O)	2025	Golden Buddha	Buddha Paymilia (EP)
"NUFF SAID" (feat. Jam Young)	2025	Golden Buddha	Buddha Paymilia (EP)
"MUGEN FRATELLI" (feat. Mugen Fratelli & HAGRID)	2025	Golden Buddha	Buddha Paymilia (EP)
"Business Man"	2025	D Blat	Business Man - Single
"Wolf King"	2025	Felcon	Thinking (EP)
"They Don't Understand"	2025	Felcon	Thinking (EP)
"Japan Flip"	2025	Felcon	Thinking (EP)
"End Is Nigh"	2025	Felcon	Thinking (EP)
"Push You (Lactose Intolerant)"	2025	Felcon	Thinking (EP)
"Questions Regarding Peace"	2025	Tylr C, $adflcko	Paradigm Shift
"A Man Apart" (feat. A-F-R-O)	2025	Tylr C, $adflcko	Paradigm Shift
"It Was I"	2025	Tylr C, $adflcko	Paradigm Shift
"ECP Intro"	2025	Elena Charis	Elena Charis
"Samurai's Daughter"	2025	Elena Charis	Elena Charis
"Severance"	2025	Elena Charis	Elena Charis
"Kelly K"	2025	Elena Charis	Elena Charis
"The Thinker"	2025	Elena Charis	Elena Charis
"The Hills"	2025	Elena Charis	Elena Charis
"Cloud 9 (A-F-R-O Jazzy Remix)"	2025	Elena Charis	Elena Charis
"Underdog" (feat. A-F-R-O, META4US, Felcon, & MVTHA CVLA)	2025	Elena Charis	Elena Charis
"Down 4 Me"	2025	Elena Charis	Elena Charis
"Betcha"	2025	Elena Charis	Elena Charis
"Psalms 23:4 (Mummiez)"	2025	Elena Charis	Elena Charis
"Astronaut Lady"	2025	Elena Charis	Elena Charis
"Crimson Fury (Intro) / The Cell"	2025	A-F-R-O	Crimson Fury (EP)
"Brawl in Cell Block 99"	2025	A-F-R-O	Crimson Fury (EP)
"AFRODEEZEAK 3 (Intro)"	2025	A-F-R-O	AFRODEEZEAK 3 (EP)
"OK"	2025	A-F-R-O	AFRODEEZEAK 3 (EP)
"King ov da Throne" (feat. Slug)	2025	A-F-R-O	AFRODEEZEAK 3 (EP)
"Curious" (feat. SuperBrownBum)	2025	A-F-R-O	AFRODEEZEAK 3 (EP)
"Mr. Fantastic" (feat. Napoleon da Legend)	2025	A-F-R-O	AFRODEEZEAK 3 (EP)
"Can't Seem 2 Understand"	2025	A-F-R-O	AFRODEEZEAK 3 (EP)
"Not da Way 2 Do It" (feat. Young Hump)	2025	A-F-R-O	AFRODEEZEAK 3 (EP)
"Roll Bounce" (feat. EKYM1536, MotionPlus, & DJ E-DuB)	2025	A-F-R-O	AFRODEEZEAK 3 (EP)
"End of an Era"	2025	A-F-R-O	AFRODEEZEAK 3 (EP)
"Things I Do" (feat. Dahliam)	2025	A-F-R-O	No More Patience (EP)
"Trap Door Intro / Sayonara" (feat. Will Sasso, Reks, Seuss Mace, Emanyouill, iNTeLL, Manus Bell, & Status the Marlboro Man)	2025	A-F-R-O	Trap Door
"Riddle 2 Dribble" (feat. Blu, MotionPlus, EKYM1536, & D Blat)	2025	A-F-R-O	Trap Door
"C U at da Top" (feat. EKYM1536, MotionPlus, Elena Charis, Tevo Jordan, & Dillon)	2025	A-F-R-O	Trap Door
"Da Buck Stops" (feat. Termanology)	2025	A-F-R-O	Trap Door
"Off da Hook" (feat. Jam Young, Pulse Reaction, H3ro, & Curt Sharp)	2025	A-F-R-O	Trap Door
"High Alert! / Skit" (feat. Super Star of Horror City & Sean the White Rapper)	2025	A-F-R-O	Trap Door
"Da Dungeon"	2025	A-F-R-O	Trap Door
"Baby Fetus & Da Bum" (feat. Amiri Lavelle & SuperBrownBum)	2025	A-F-R-O	Trap Door
"Neck Broken / Skit" (feat. Wordsworth, John Jigg$, & Emsee Prospekt)	2025	A-F-R-O	Trap Door
"No Betta" (feat. Young Hump, 60 East, Tevo Jordan, Jam Young, & MotionPlus)	2025	A-F-R-O	Trap Door
"Ikiru / Dead Man's Door"	2025	A-F-R-O	Trap Door
"Three Chamberz / Skit" (feat. DudeSirius, D Blat, & Blind Toxic)	2025	A-F-R-O	Trap Door
"Den of Thieves"	2025	A-F-R-O	Trap Door
"Hiroyuki"	2025	A-F-R-O	Trap Door
"Junkyard Dawgz" (feat. Jon Connor, EKYM1536, H3ro, & Ace of Chosen Kingz)	2025	A-F-R-O	Trap Door
"Carnage / Gimme a Break"	2025	A-F-R-O	Trap Door
"My Nightz / On da Lookout!" (feat. DudeSirius & Rod)	2025	A-F-R-O	Trap Door
"BBQ Session (Posse Part 4)"	2025	A-F-R-O	Trap Door
"Da Last Straw / Carnage Pt. 2"	2025	A-F-R-O	Trap Door
"Stop Frontin'" (feat. MotionPlus, Elena Charis, Pulse Reaction, & SuperBrownBum)	2025	A-F-R-O	Trap Door
"BACK"	2026	A-F-R-O	Single
"No H.E. Double Hockey Sticks"	2026	A-F-R-O	Blood Rain (EP)
"No Talk"	2026	A-F-R-O	Blood Rain (EP)
"Burn It Up"	2026	A-F-R-O	Blood Rain (EP)
"Blood Rain"	2026	A-F-R-O	Blood Rain (EP)
"Trap Door 2 Intro" (feat. Amir J. Sadeghi)	2026	A-F-R-O	Trap Door 2
"Tavern of Evil" (feat. Emsee Prospekt, EKYM1536, Eighty Spadez, Elena Charis, Truth0470, Flotrix, & MotionPlus)	2026	A-F-R-O	Trap Door 2
"Play on Wordz" (feat. Bishop Lamont, Wordsworth, Terror Van Poo, & MotionPlus)	2026	A-F-R-O	Trap Door 2
"Feel da Beat" (feat. K.I.D. Casper, Big Earth, Procyse, & m1L)	2026	A-F-R-O	Trap Door 2
"Mystic Men" (feat. Lone.Fractal, Lil' GHO$T, Meta4us, King Khazm, es-1, Mystic, Ojo Jones, Everaldo Zacarias Jr., & DJ E-DuB)	2026	A-F-R-O	Trap Door 2
"Armageddon" (feat. Alan Z, Sevin Soprano, Rumor the God, & Emsee Prospekt)	2026	A-F-R-O	Trap Door 2
"Vertigo" (feat. MotionPlus & MaceyOMaze)	2026	A-F-R-O	Trap Door 2
"Murder She Wrote" (feat. Eighty Spadez & K.I.D. Casper)	2026	A-F-R-O	Trap Door 2
"Manfredi / Sean the White Rapper" (feat. MZ1, ?nowledge, Abe the Freak, Sammy Warm Hands, Open Minded & Sean the White Rapper)	2026	A-F-R-O	Trap Door 2
"Abandon Ship" (feat. Greybeard, Status the Marlboro Man, Eighty Spadez, & Rash Reed)	2026	A-F-R-O	Trap Door 2
"Records & Tapes" (feat. m1L & SuperBrownBum)	2026	A-F-R-O	Trap Door 2
"Tony Hawk / Skit" (feat. K.I.D. Casper, Baller Brown, Eighty Spadez, & Felcon)	2026	A-F-R-O	Trap Door 2
"Now or Later / Wiseguy" (feat. Pulse Reaction, StrataG, Emsee Prospekt, & Trevor "Young Lord" Davison)	2026	A-F-R-O	Trap Door 2
"From da Heart" (feat. Souleye, Irakoski, WO6EPH, Erik Solo, AA, Kevin Mic Check, & Nick Name)	2026	A-F-R-O	Trap Door 2
"Captain Now / Skit" (feat. Jon Connor, Blu, MZ1, YaH-Ra, MC Wicks, Madd Illz, Eksale, Felcon, Rod & Kamari Leaha)	2026	A-F-R-O	Trap Door 2
"Smooth Operator" (feat. 60 East, H3RO, & Jam Young)	2026	A-F-R-O	Trap Door 2
"Supaman" (feat. Eddi Brocc, Big Chief Smash & DJ Ace the Cut Lieutenant)	2026	A-F-R-O	Trap Door 2
"Junkyard Dawgz 2 / Moovin" (feat. EKYM1536, iLLIODD, Elena Charis, Divine Flowz, H3RO, Ace of Chosen Kingz, & D Blat)	2026	A-F-R-O	Trap Door 2
"Barb Wire" (feat. Blaq Poet & Blind Toxic)	2026	A-F-R-O	Trap Door 2
"Against the World / Outro" (feat. Novel, Wordsworth, MotionPlus & George Paez)	2026	A-F-R-O	Trap Door 2
"Kali-4-Nia"	2026	Elena Charis	Single
"Frequencies (Intro)"	2026	A-F-R-O & MotionPlus	Frequencies
"Sleepwalkin'"	2026	A-F-R-O & MotionPlus	Frequencies
"Da Family"	2026	A-F-R-O & MotionPlus	Frequencies
"Documented"	2026	A-F-R-O & MotionPlus	Frequencies
"Obstacle Course"	2026	A-F-R-O & MotionPlus	Frequencies
"Mad Scientists"	2026	A-F-R-O & MotionPlus	Frequencies
"Foundational" (feat. StrataG)	2026	A-F-R-O & MotionPlus	Frequencies
"Get on Down"	2026	A-F-R-O & MotionPlus	Frequencies
"Biblical" (feat. Elena Charis)	2026	A-F-R-O & MotionPlus	Frequencies
"Clutch of Death"	2026	A-F-R-O & MotionPlus	Frequencies
"Flowers" (feat. Alyssa Jane)	2026	A-F-R-O & MotionPlus	Frequencies
"Kill Switch" (feat. EKYM1536 & Emsee Prospekt)	2026	A-F-R-O & MotionPlus	Frequencies
"Mind Ovr Matter Part 2 Intro"	2026	Emsee Prospekt	Mind Ovr Matter, Pt. 2
"Red Dawn"	2026	Emsee Prospekt	Mind Ovr Matter, Pt. 2
"Addicted Snowman"	2026	Emsee Prospekt	Mind Ovr Matter, Pt. 2
"Trembling Handz"	2026	Emsee Prospekt	Mind Ovr Matter, Pt. 2
"Talez of Rough Livin'" (feat. MotionPlus, 60 East, Felcon, & Cristopolis)	2026	Emsee Prospekt	Mind Ovr Matter, Pt. 2
"State of Emergency"	2026	Emsee Prospekt	Mind Ovr Matter, Pt. 2
"3 AM"	2026	Emsee Prospekt	Mind Ovr Matter, Pt. 2
"Mizery Loves Companie"	2026	Emsee Prospekt	Mind Ovr Matter, Pt. 2
"Raw & Spectacular"	2026	Emsee Prospekt	Mind Ovr Matter, Pt. 2
"Poet or the Psycho, Pt. 2"	2026	Emsee Prospekt	Mind Ovr Matter, Pt. 2
"DANGEROUZ MINDZ" (feat. A-F-R-O, Reks, Seuss Mace, & Gifted Youngstaz)	2026	Emsee Prospekt	Mind Ovr Matter, Pt. 2
"Wh0 Am I?"	2026	Emsee Prospekt	Mind Ovr Matter, Pt. 2
"Alleyway Saturday"	2026	Rash Reed	Fresh Paint
"Bad Pitt"	2026	Rash Reed	Fresh Paint
"Chinatown Clownhouse"	2026	Rash Reed	Fresh Paint
"Villains" (feat. wolfymane)	2026	Rash Reed	Fresh Paint
"Nightshift Narratives"	2026	Rash Reed	Fresh Paint
"Pandemonium" (feat. A-F-R-O)	2026	Rash Reed	Fresh Paint
"High on Aerosol"	2026	Rash Reed	Fresh Paint
"Ripstick Exorcism"	2026	Rash Reed	Fresh Paint

== Awards and nominations ==
=== Clio Awards ===
Year	Category	Nominated work	Result
2016	Gold Winner Award	Honda Uncharted	Won

=== One-Wheeler Short Film Competition ===
Year	Category	Nominated work	Result
2021	Best Short Film	Bad Deal	Special Mention [Winner]

=== IndieX Film Fest ===
Year	Category	Nominated work	Result
2025	Best Music Video	Posse Part 3	Nominated
