= Sweet Lorraine (film) =

1987 film by Steve Gomer

- Directed by: Steve Gomer
- Written by: Michael Zettler; Shelly Altman
- Produced by: Steve Gomer
- Starring: Maureen Stapleton; Trini Alvarado; John Bedford Lloyd; Freddie Roman; Giancarlo Esposito; Edith Falco; Todd Graff; Evan Handler; Tamara Tunie
- Cinematography: Rene Ohashi
- Edited by: Laurence Solomon
- Music by: Richard Robbins
- Production companies: Angelika Films; Autumn Pictures
- Distributed by: Angelika Films
- Release date: May 8, 1987
- Running time: 91 minutes
- Country: United States
- Language: English

Sweet Lorraine is a 1987 American film directed by Steve Gomer in his directorial debut. The film draws from Gomer's adolescent experiences at the Heiden Hotel in the Catskills.

== Plot ==
During summer, Molly Garber meets her grandmother Lillian at the Lorraine, a Catskills resort that appears to be nearing the end of its days. Owned by Lillian, The Lorraine, once the crown jewel of the Borscht Belt, is now dilapidated, staffed by a number of rambunctious kids, and barely held together by a single handyman. The hotel is being pursued by developers and the returning clientele comes to stay more out of nostalgia than anything.

The film follows Molly's camaraderie with the staff and the bond she has with her grandmother, her affair with the hotel's sole handyman, and her subsequent determination to rescue the Lorraine from being sold.

== Cast ==
- Maureen Stapleton as Lillian Garber
- Trini Alvarado as Molly
- Lee Richardson as Sam
- John Bedford Lloyd as Jack
- Freddie Roman as Phil Allen
- Giancarlo Esposito as Howie
- Edith Falco as Karen
- Todd Graff as Leonard
- Evan Handler as Bobby
- Tamara Tunie as Julie

== Production ==
Sweet Lorraine was shot at the Heiden Hotel before it was demolished.

== Reception ==
=== Critical reception ===
Michael Wilmington of the Los Angeles Times stated that at times the story got "as threadbare as the Lorraine", but pointed out that its sincerity and the "affection that inspired it" carried the film.

In a review for The New York Times, Janet Maslin stated that the film lacked "polish and momentum" but that it had a "cheerful, good-natured feeling". She described Sweet Lorraine as a "a friendly, agreeably aimless portrait of the Heiden".

Larry Kart of the Chicago Tribune gave Sweet Lorraine a less than favorable review. He described the film as a "lukewarm cinematic blintz" and as "aggressively nice and rather bland" compared to Dirty Dancing, a romantic drama also set in a Catskills resort and released that same year. Kart criticized the film's pace, stating that the Sweet Lorraine was hampered by " a lack of dramatic heat" and that "not enough happens to make it more than a moderately pleasant way to pass the time". A few of the "odd" casting choices were also criticized, due to the not being Jewish despite the film's "explicitly Jewish" atmosphere. Kart concluded his review by praising Freddie Roman's performance, and by stating that Gomer's "low-key approach gives the film the feel of an anecdote that has been mounted for public television, not theatrical release".

In his book American Jewish Films: The Search for Identity, Lawrence J. Epstein states that Sweet Lorraine captured the nostalgia of the Catskill resorts more authentically compared to Dirty Dancing, and that the Lorraine "transcends the location to become a metaphor for what humans should do with their own pasts." In Irwin Richman's book Catskill Hotels, Sweet Lorraine is described as an "exceptional movie about Catskill hotel life".

New York Magazine described the film as a comedy.
