= Blood Shine =

2025 horror film

- Film poster
- Directed by: Emily Bennett; Justin Brooks
- Written by: Emily Bennett; Justin Brooks
- Produced by: Emily Bennett; Justin Brooks
- Starring: Emily Bennett; David Call; Brendan Sexton III; Larry Fessenden
- Production company: Zeus Pictures
- Distributed by: Dark Sky Films
- Release date: August 23, 2025 (FrightFest)
- Running time: 91 minutes
- Country: United States
- Language: English

Blood Shine is a 2025 horror film written and directed by Emily Bennett and Justin Brooks, starring Emily Bennett, David Call, Brendan Sexton III, and Larry Fessenden.

== Premise ==
A filmmaker goes to a remote cabin in upstate New York to write. There, he is kidnapped by a mysterious woman who's part of a cult that emphasizes the divine power of light.

== Cast ==
- Emily Bennett as Clara
- David Call as Brighton West
- Brendan Sexton III as Keith
- Larry Fessenden as Leader

== Release ==
Blood Shine premiered at the 2025 FrightFest on August 23, 2025. It premiered in the United States at the Brooklyn Horror Film Festival in 2025.

=== Critical reception ===
On the review aggregator website Rotten Tomatoes, 83% of 18 critics' reviews are positive.

Matthew Jackson of Bloody Disgusting praised the film's "ambition, visual beauty, and genuinely unnerving narrative", concluding that "what it lacks in narrative clarity it more than makes up for in sheer emotional and visceral force." Ben Glidden of Film Threat gave the film a score of 7.5 out of 10, stating that "it creates a darkness that will seep into your core and stick with you long after the final credits roll." Sebastian Zavala of Loud and Clear Reviews appreciated the film's "narrative and thematic ambition", but also stated that "it doesn't fully work as a horror experience, meandering for a good while, feeling repetitive and ultimately failing to generate a strong response from the viewer."
