= Frequencies (A-F-R-O and MotionPlus album) =

Studio album by A-F-R-O and MotionPlus
- Released: June 26, 2026
- Genres: Underground hip-hop/rap, Christian rap
- Length: 45 mins
- Label: FRO Thizzle Productions / The SoulFeed
- Producers: A-F-R-O; MotionPlus; Stu Bangas; BobCatt the Legend; Counterphit

Frequencies is a collaborative album by American rapper and record producer A-F-R-O and American underground Christian rapper, MotionPlus. It was released on June 26, 2026 by FRO Thizzle Productions and The SoulFeed. A-F-R-O handled a bulk of the production, with contributions from Stu Bangas, MotionPlus, BobCatt the Legend, and Counterphit.

== Background ==
After collaborating on numerous efforts, A-F-R-O and MotionPlus decided to work on a full-length studio album. A-F-R-O was originally going to produce the entire album, but decided to include production from regular collaborator Stu Bangas, and newcomers BobCatt the Legend and Counterphit. A-F-R-O also made the recommendation for MotionPlus to produce a track.

On June 1, 2026, A-F-R-O and MotionPlus announced Frequencies. The front cover and tracklist were released on their Instagram profiles on June 5. A music video for "Sleepwalkin'" was released on July 4, 2026.

== Critical reception ==
Professional ratings
Review scores
Source	Rating
Hip-Hop Golden Age	9/10
Album of the Year	84/100

Frequencies received positive reviews.

Hip-Hop Golden Age gave the album a 9/10 and says, "This is one of the strongest Hip Hop albums of the year. Not because it tries to reinvent the form, but because it commits fully to it. It knows its audience, and it speaks to it clearly. For us, this is exactly what we want from a record like this. A-F-R-O and MotionPlus lock in, stay focused, and deliver something that holds up from start to finish."

== Track listing ==
All tracks are written by James Gutierrez, William Sterns.

All credits adapted from Apple Music
No.	Title	Music	Length
1.	"Frequencies (Intro)"	A-F-R-O
2.	"Sleepwalkin'"	A-F-R-O
3.	"Da Family"	A-F-R-O
4.	"Labor of Fruit"	BobCatt the Legend
5.	"Documented"	A-F-R-O
6.	"Building 7"	Counterphit
7.	"Obstacle Course"	A-F-R-O
8.	"Mad Scientists"	A-F-R-O
9.	"Foundational (feat. StrataG)"	A-F-R-O
10.	"Get on Down"	A-F-R-O
11.	"Biblical (feat. Elena Charis)"	A-F-R-O
12.	"Welcome 2 Reality"	MotionPlus
13.	"Clutch of Death"	A-F-R-O
14.	"Flowers (feat. Alyssa Jane)"	A-F-R-O
15.	"That Feelin' (feat. SKAMM)"	Stu Bangas
16.	"Kill Switch (feat. EKYM1536 & Emsee Prospekt)"	A-F-R-O
Total length:			45 mins
