= Evan Handler =

American actor (born 1961)

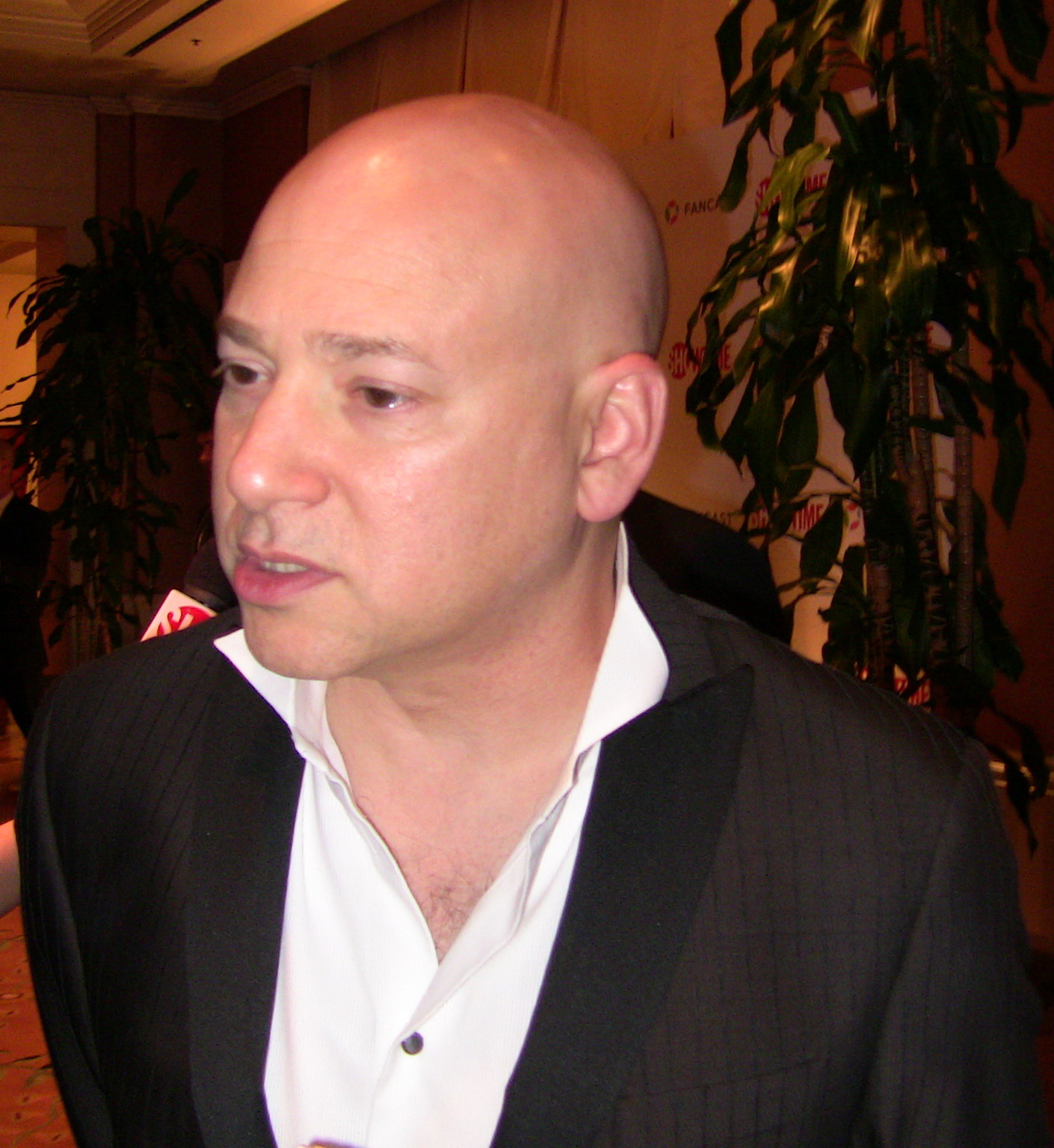
- Handler at a 2009 Golden Globe Awards party
- Born: January 10, 1961 (age 65); New York City, U.S.
- Occupations: Actor, Agent
- Years active: 1981–present
- Spouse: Elisa Atti (m. 2003)
- Children: 1

Evan Handler (born January 10, 1961) is an American actor who is best known for playing Harry Goldenblatt, a divorce attorney and later husband of Charlotte York, on Sex and the City (2002–2004) and its revival series And Just Like That... (2021–25), and Charlie Runkle, Hank Moody's comically bumbling friend and agent, on Californication (2007–2014). He also starred as Eastern District US Attorney Jacob Warner in the Starz drama Power.

== Early life ==
Handler was born in New York City, to secular Jewish parents Enid Irene, a mental health administrator, and Murry Raymond Handler, an agency owner and advertising designer. He was raised in the Town of Cortlandt, New York, near Croton-on-Hudson, New York, and attended Hendrick Hudson High School in Montrose, New York.

After graduating from high school a year early, Handler moved to New York City and worked as an intern at the Chelsea Theater Center. During that time he appeared in the Off-Broadway plays Biography: A Game and Strider: The Story of a Horse. He then attended the Juilliard School as a member of the Drama Division's Group 12 (1979–1983), which also included Kevin Spacey, Ving Rhames, and Elizabeth McGovern. Handler left the four-year program after less than two years to accept a role in the 1981 film Taps.

== Career ==
=== Acting ===
Handler has appeared in television dramas and sitcoms including Six Feet Under, Friends, Law & Order, The West Wing, Miami Vice, Sex and the City, Studio 60 on the Sunset Strip, Ed, Lost, 24 and Power. He was a co-star in the ABC sitcoms It's Like, You Know... and Hot Properties and starred in the ill-fated FOX sitcom Woops!.

He has also appeared in several major feature film roles, including Ransom, 1996; The Chosen, 1981; Sweet Lorraine, 1987; and Taps, 1981.

In 2000, Handler portrayed Larry Fine in the made-for-TV biopic The Three Stooges. He played Goldman Sachs CEO Lloyd Blankfein in the HBO movie, Too Big to Fail. The movie was based on the book of the same name written by Andrew Ross Sorkin. From 2007-2014, Handler played Charlie Runkle, the best friend and agent to David Duchovny's character Hank Moody on Californication. In 2016 he had a recurring role in American Crime Story: The People v. O. J. Simpson as Alan Dershowitz, an attorney adviser for the defense in the O. J. Simpson murder case in 1995.

In 1991, Handler famously walked off stage during the first act of a performance of the Broadway play I Hate Hamlet after co-star Nicol Williamson broke choreography during a sword-fighting scene and struck Handler on the backside. Handler responded later, "I removed myself from the production because from the first day of rehearsals I have endured the show's producers condoning Nicol Williamson's persistent abusiveness to other cast members." Handler's understudy continued the performance, for which Gregory Peck and Elaine Stritch were in attendance.

In 2020, Handler appeared as a guest on the Studio 60 on the Sunset Strip marathon fundraiser episode of The George Lucas Talk Show.

=== Writing ===
Handler is also an author. His first book, Time On Fire: My Comedy of Terrors, tells the story of his unlikely recovery from acute myeloid leukemia in his mid-20s. His second, It's Only Temporary...The Good News and the Bad News of Being Alive, tells the story of his long journey toward gratitude in the years after his illness. The book was released in May 2008. Handler has written for several nationally distributed magazines, including ELLE, O, the Oprah Magazine, and Mirabella. Handler contributes regularly to The Huffington Post.

== Personal life ==
Evan married Elisa Atti, an Italian-born chemist, in 2003, and they have a daughter, Sofia Clementina Handler (born January 17, 2007).

Handler has a brother Lowell and a sister Lillian. Lowell, a writer and photographer, is the author of the book Twitch & Shout: A Touretter's Tale and the star, narrator, and associate producer of the Emmy-nominated PBS television documentary Twitch & Shout, in which Evan appeared.

=== Activism ===
In 2014 Handler starred in a public service announcement supporting DC Statehood. He attended the Creative Coalition's DC Statehood Dinner in December 2015 and participates in DC Shadow Senator Paul Strauss's "51 Stars" campaign which aims to enlist 51 celebrities to endorse making Washington, DC the 51st state.

== Filmography ==
=== Film ===
Year	Title	Role	Notes
1981	The Chosen	Sidney Goldberg	
1981	Taps	Edward West	
1982	Dear Mr. Wonderful	Ray	
1985	War and Love	Elie	
1987	Sweet Lorraine	Bobby	
1994	Natural Born Killers	David	
1996	Ransom	Miles Roberts	
2008	Sex and the City	Harry Goldenblatt	
2010	Sex and the City 2	Harry Goldenblatt	
2011	The Family Tree	Harvey "Harv" Druckner	
2012	Should've Been Romeo	Stewart	
2019	Lying and Stealing	Eric Maropakis	
2019	Foster Boy	Samuel Collins	
2023	Reverse the Curse	Benny	
TBA	Empire City	Chief Bagley	Post-production

=== Television ===
Year	Title	Role	Notes
1985	Miami Vice	Louis Martinez	Episode: "Milk Run"
1987	CBS Schoolbreak Special	Allen	Episode: "What If I'm Gay?"
1991–1992	Sibs	Monty	4 episodes
1992	Woops!	Mark Braddock	11 episodes
1996	One Life to Live	Conrad Klein	Unknown episodes
1999	New York Undercover	Carl	Episode: "Catharsis"
1999–2001	It's Like, You Know...	Shrug	26 episodes
2000	The Three Stooges	Larry Fine	Television movie
2000	Law & Order	Eli Becker	Episode: "Return"
2001	The West Wing	Douglas Wegland	3 episodes
2001	Ed	Dr. Crazy	Episode: "Crazy Time"
2002	The Guardian	Mitchell Lichtman	3 episodes
2002–2004	Sex and the City	Harry Goldenblatt	18 episodes
2002	John Doe	Max Clark	Episode: "Low Art"
2003	Friends	The Director	Episode: "The One Where Rachel Goes Back to Work"
2003	Six Feet Under	Scott Phillip Smith	Episode: "Nobody Sleeps"
2004	Without a Trace	Bruce Caplan	Episode: "American Goddess"
2004	Jack & Bobby	Cary Donovan	2 episodes
2004	Joan of Arcadia	Chuck Kroner	2 episodes
2005	24	David Weiss	Episode: "Day 4: 12:00 a.m.-1:00 a.m."
2005	Hot Properties	Dr. Sellers Boyd	13 episodes
2006	CSI: Miami	Norman Stein	Episode: "Fade Out"
2006	Lost	Dave	Episode: "Dave"
2006	Studio 60 on the Sunset Strip	Ricky Tahoe	4 episodes
2007	Shark	Stanley Davis	Episode: "Trial by Fire"
2007–2014	Californication	Charlie Runkle	Main cast
2011	Too Big to Fail	Lloyd Blankfein	Television movie
2011–2012	Necessary Roughness	Marshall Pitman	5 episodes
2015	The Astronaut Wives Club	Duncan "Dunk" Pringle	10 episodes
2016	The Breaks	Jonah "Juggy" Aaron	Television movie
2016	American Crime Story	Alan Dershowitz	4 episodes
2017	The Breaks	Jonah "Juggy" Aaron	8 episodes
2018	The Good Fight	Jonathan	Episode: "Day 443"
2019	Fosse/Verdon	Hal Prince	Television miniseries Episodes: "Life Is a Cabaret" and "Who's Got the Pain?"
2019–2020	Power	District Attorney Jacob Warner	15 episodes
2019	L.A.'s Finest	Captain Thomas Hirsch	Episode: "Pilot"
2019	Daughterhood	Mike	Episode: "Mother's Day"
2021–2025	And Just Like That...	Harry Goldenblatt	30 episodes
2026	Best Medicine	Jeremy Gathercole	Episode: "There Might Be Blood"; uncredited
