= Mirror Music =

Studio album by Wordsworth
- Released: August 24, 2004
- Genre: Hip hop
- Length: 76:17
- Label: Halftooth Records
- Producer: Ayatollah; DJ Static; Da Beatminerz; Dox 1; DJ 3D; DJ A. Vee; Curt Gowdy; Frequency; Oddisee; Sebb; Belief; Dave Dar; R. Thentic

Wordsworth chronology
Mirror Music (2004)	The Photo Album (2012)

Singles from Mirror Music
- 1. "On Your Feet" "That Way" Released: 2002

Mirror Music is the debut solo studio album by American rapper Wordsworth. It was released by Halftooth Records in 2004.

== Title ==
Regarding the album's title, Wordsworth commented: "I felt the songs reflected the emotion, time or period that either I went through, someone next to me went through or somebody that might not even know me went through." He added: "And when I look at people, the audience, and they look at me, I think they see a reflection from me in my music."

== Critical reception ==
Professional ratings
Review scores
Source	Rating
AllHipHop	4/5 stars
The A.V. Club	mixed
Exclaim!	favorable
HipHopDX	4.0/5
RapReviews.com	9/10

Kenny Rodriguez of AllHipHop wrote: "Mirror Music is proof that Words is much more than simply a freestyle MC with clever one-liners." He added: "Without totally immersing himself into the conscious genre, Words successfully jumps from dropping similes to dropping jewels in mid-sentence." Meanwhile, Nathan Rabin of The A.V. Club wrote: "Wordsworth is so good at playing the role of the wisecrack-dispensing smart-ass that it's almost a shame he spends so much of Mirror Music grappling soberly with the challenges of being a socially conscious adult and father." He added: "It's hard to fault an artist for trying to say something meaningful, but Wordsworth might have been better off putting out a funny album with a few serious songs instead of a serious album with a few light moments."

== Track listing ==
No.	Title	Producer(s)	Length
1.	"Right Now"	Ayatollah	4:13
2.	"What We Gon' Do"	DJ Static	2:50
3.	"12 Months"	Da Beatminerz	4:11
4.	"Trust"	Dox 1	4:46
5.	"Be a Man"	DJ 3D; DJ A. Vee	4:05
6.	"Not Fair" (featuring Punchline)	Curt Gowdy	3:06
7.	"One Day"	Frequency	4:06
8.	"Gotta Pay"	Oddisee	4:14
9.	"Shoulder"	Frequency	4:08
10.	"Head High" (featuring Kenn Starr and Oddisee)	Oddisee	4:12
11.	"Guardian Angel"	Curt Gowdy	4:02
12.	"Point Blank"	Sebb	2:32
13.	"Fast Lane"	Belief	3:56
14.	"Don't Go" (featuring Adanita Ross)	Frequency	3:57
15.	"Evol" (featuring Justin Time and Masta Ace)	Ayatollah	3:26
16.	"Run"	Dave Dar	4:04
17.	"Unity" (featuring Meleni)	R. Thentic	3:46
18.	"Gonna Be"	Oddisee	3:29
19.	"On Your Feet" (bonus track)	Da Beatminerz	4:04
20.	"That Way" (bonus track)	Curt Gowdy	3:10
Total length:			76:17
