= Focus (MotionPlus album) =

FOCUS

Studio album by MotionPlus
- Released: January 31, 2025
- Recorded: 2024–2025
- Genres: Hip-hop/Rap, Christian rap
- Length: 34 minutes, 58 seconds
- Label: FRO Thizzle Productions / SOLFEEDER
- Producer: A-F-R-O

Singles from FOCUS
- 1. "S.O.S. (Souls On Sale)" Released: January 3, 2025; 2. "Time" Released: January 17, 2025

FOCUS is the third studio album by American underground Christian rapper, MotionPlus. It was released on January 31, 2025 by FRO Thizzle Productions and SOLFEEDER. Production was handled entirely by A-F-R-O.

== Background ==
MotionPlus reached out to A-F-R-O after receiving a beat that he would later record to, naming the song "King's Grace." A-F-R-O suggested to MotionPlus that they continue to create music together, which spawned multiple collaborations since.

The first single "S.O.S. (Souls on Sale)" was released on January 3, 2025. The second single "Time" was released on January 17, 2025.

Polished Arrow Music writes, "Featuring the singles “S.O.S. (Souls On Sale)” and “Time,” Focus is as intentional as it is needed in the Christian rap genre at this time. MotionPlus brings his years of experience and combines it with A-F-R-O's trailblazing production to create a defining moment in the subgenre's history. Focus is not an album strictly for the Church, yet it fills a void that has been vacant for some time. It is not an album strictly for the underground, yet it finds itself right at home outside of the spotlight.

== Critical reception ==
FOCUS was well received by music critics.

== Track listing ==
All tracks are written by William Sterns.

No.	Title	Length
1.	"Intro"	1:23
2.	"Wake Up"	2:47
3.	"Time"	2:47
4.	"Survival Guide (feat. Procyse and Knaladeus)"	3:36
5.	"Heights"	2:30
6.	"Beware of the Villains"	2:22
7.	"Home Ain't a Home"	3:47
8.	"Find (feat. Tevo Jordan and Antonia Marquee)"	3:28
9.	"Lyrical Whatever (feat. A-F-R-O)"	2:41
10.	"S.O.S. (Souls on Sale)"	2:27
11.	"It's a Blessing"	2:35
12.	"Backyard Brawl"	4:30
13.	"King's Grace (Bonus Track)"	2:00
Total length:		34 minutes, 58 seconds
