= The Breaks (TV series) =

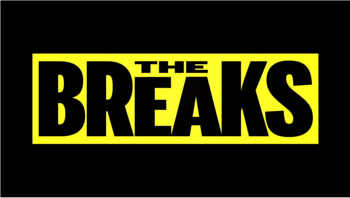
- Genre: Drama
- Created by: Dan Charnas; Seith Mann
- Starring: Afton Williamson; Wood Harris; Tristan Wilds; Antoine Harris; David Call; Evan Handler; Melonie Diaz
- Country of origin: United States
- Original language: English
- No. of seasons: 1
- No. of episodes: 8

Production
- Executive producers: Seith Mann; Darren Goldberg; Dan Charnas; John J. Strauss; Bill Flanagan; Maggie Malina; Chris McCarthy; Amy Doyle
- Running time: 42 minutes
- Production companies: Atlantic Pictures; VH1 Productions

Original release
- Network: VH1
- Release: February 20 – April 10, 2017

The Breaks is an American drama television series created by Dan Charnas and Seith Mann, serving as a continuation of the 2016 television film The Breaks. The series stars Afton Williamson, Wood Harris, Tristan Wilds, Antoine Harris, David Call, Evan Handler, and Melonie Diaz. The series premiered on VH1 on February 20, 2017. In April 2017, the series was renewed for a second season that would have aired on BET, but BET announced that it had canceled the series renewal in late November.

== Cast ==
- Afton Williamson as Nikki
- Wood Harris as Barry Fouray
- Tristan Wilds as DeeVee
- Antoine Harris as Ahm
- David Call as David
- Evan Handler as Juggy
- Melonie Diaz as Damita
- Marcus Callender as Scooby
- De'Adre Aziza as Tamika Grant
- Method Man as Darryl Van Putten Sr.
- Gloria Reuben as Mattie Taylor
- A-F-R-O as D-Rome
- Aaron J. Nelson as Bruce
- Sinqua Walls as Terrance "Lil' Ray" Baltimore
- Ali Ahn as Josie Cho
- Teyana Taylor as Imani X
- Kim Wayans as Ella
- Lela Rochon as Marie Jones
- Dave East as Hashim
- Hassan Johnson as Det. Anthony Purdell
- William Jackson Harper as Stephen Jenkins
- Russell Hornsby as Sampson King
- Macc H. Plaise as Jacques Fouray
- J. Bernard Calloway as Gordie Charlon
- Corey Allen as Benson
- Kandé Amadou as Tina
- Reginald L. Barnes as DJ X
- Philip Martin Reid as Scooter
- Omar Salmon as Brotha
- Jamar Greene as George Wilkinson
- Annalaina Marks as Rachel Greenbaum
- Michael McFadden as Eddie O'Laughlin

== Episodes ==
No.	Title	Directed by	Written by	Original release date	Prod. code	US viewers (millions)
1	"Hard to Handle"	Rashaad Ernesto Green	Seith Mann & John J. Strauss	February 20, 2017	101	1.21
2	"It's Just Begun"	Rashaad Ernesto Green	Jas Waters	February 27, 2017	102	1.10
3	"Blind Alley"	Alex Hall	Marcus J. Guillory	March 6, 2017	103	1.35
4	"Substitution"	Alex Hall	John J. Strauss	March 13, 2017	104	1.20
5	"Amen, Brother"	Neema Barnette	Monica Macer	March 20, 2017	105	1.06
6	"Runaway"	Neema Barnette	Monica Macer	March 27, 2017	106	1.13
7	"Under Pressure"	Seith Mann	Tanya Barfield	April 3, 2017	107	1.02
8	"N.T."	Seith Mann	Seith Mann	April 10, 2017	108	0.96
