= David Call =

American actor

- Born: David Steven Call; August 14, 1982 (age 44); Issaquah, Washington, U.S.
- Occupation: Actor
- Years active: 2005–present

David Steven Call (born August 14, 1982) is an American actor.

== Early life ==
Call was born in Issaquah, Washington. He is a graduate student of the Tisch School of the Arts and the Atlantic Theater Company Acting School.

== Career ==
Call's first acting role was an uncredited role in the 2005 film The Notorious Bettie Page, followed by roles in the 2006 films The Architect and Beautiful Ohio. In 2007, he appeared in the romantic drama film Evening. He guest-starred in the television series Law & Order: Criminal Intent as Ricky Moss in the episode "Neighborhood Watch", and he appeared on Army Wives. In 2009, he appeared in five episodes of the drama series Rescue Me as the adult Connor Gavin. He also joined the cast of NBC's medical drama Mercy. He got a supporting role in the 2009 film Did You Hear About the Morgans? starring Sarah Jessica Parker and Hugh Grant. He appeared in the 2010 independent films Tiny Furniture and Two Gates of Sleep.

In July 2010, Call joined the cast of The CW's young-adult teen drama series Gossip Girl as Ben Donovan, who is connected to two other then-new characters—Juliet Sharp (Katie Cassidy) and Colin Forrester (Samuel Page).

Call portrayed the recurring role of Nick Lane, on the Fox science-fiction series Fringe. The character made his first appearance in the first season episode "Bad Dreams", which was critically lauded.

In 2013, he appeared on the NBC drama series Smash as Adam, Jimmy Collins's older brother, and on the USA Network series White Collar.

== Filmography ==
=== Film ===
Year	Title	Role	Notes
2005	The Notorious Bettie Page	Guy #1 at party	Uncredited
2006	The Architect	Kiff	
2006	Beautiful Ohio	Clive Messerman	
2007	Evening	Pip	
2008	Clown Dad	Sal	Short film
2008	New York, I Love You	Gil	
2009	Once More with Feeling	Kevin	
2009	Breaking Upwards	David	
2009	Did You Hear About the Morgans?	Doc D. Simmons	
2010	B.U.S.T.	—N/a	Short film; director, producer, and story writer
2010	Tiny Furniture	Keith	
2010	Two Gates of Sleep	Louis	
2011	The Disarticulation of Sarah Danner	Damian	Short film
2011	RearView	Nathaniel	Short film; also executive producer and writer
2011	Exhume	Aidan	Short film
2011	The Strange Ones	Man	Short film
2011	The Best Man for the Job	James	
2011	Northeast	Will	
2012	Nobody Walks	Man	
2012	Dead Man's Burden	Heck Kirkland	
2012	Nor'easter	Erik Angstrom	
2013	Mobile Homes	Evan	Short film
2014	The Heart Machine	Dale	
2014	Gabriel	Matthew	
2015	James White	Elliot	
2015	The Girl in the Book	Emmett Grant	
2016	Americana	Avery Wells	
2017	Wallflower	Murderer	
2018	Dark Was the Night	Jake	
2019	Depraved	Henry	
2020	Close Contact		short-film
2023	Before the World Set on Fire	Cole	
2023	Insidious: The Red Door	Smash Face / Ben Burton	
2025	Blood Shine	Brighton West	
TBA	Montauk	Collier	post-production

=== Television ===
Year	Title	Role	Notes
2008	Canterbury's Law	Martin	3 episodes
2008–2009	Army Wives	Mac	6 episodes
2008	Law & Order: Criminal Intent	Ricky Moss	Episode: "Neighborhood Watch"
2009–2012	Fringe	Prime Nick Lane / Alternate Nick Lane / Prime-Amber Nick Lane	3 episodes
2009–2010	Rescue Me	Adult Connor Gavin	5 episodes
2009	Numbers	Benjamin Polk	Episode: "Hangman"
2010	Mercy	Paul Kempton	6 episodes
2010–2011	Gossip Girl	Ben Donovan	12 episodes
2013	Smash	Adam	5 episodes
2013	White Collar	Nate Griffith	Episode: "Controlling Interest"
2014	The Following	Lance	Episode: "Unmasked"
2015–2016, 2019	The Magicians	Pete	13 episodes
2016	The Breaks	David Aaron	Television film
2016	Quantico	Jeremy Miller	Episode: "KUDOVE"
2017	The Breaks	David Aaron	4 episodes
2018	The Blacklist	Brian Barrett	Episode: "Mr. Raleigh Sinclair III (No. 51)"
2018	The Good Fight	Drew Lovatto	2 episodes
2018	Shades of Blue	Donnelly	Episode: "The Reckoning"
2018	The Sinner	Andy "Brick" Brickowski	7 episodes
2021	The Equalizer	Elias Wilson	Episode: "True Believer"
