= Freddie Roman =

American stand-up comedian (1937–2022)

- Roman performing at the Sylvia and Danny Kaye Playhouse in New York, 1996
- Born: Fred Kirschenbaum; May 28, 1937; Jamaica, Queens, New York, U.S.
- Died: November 26, 2022 (aged 85); Boynton Beach, Florida, U.S.

Comedy career
- Medium: Stand-up comedy
- Genres: Jewish humor, observational comedy

Freddie Roman (born Fred Kirschenbaum; May 28, 1937 – November 26, 2022) was an American stand-up comedian, best known for his frequent appearances at "Borscht Belt" hotels.

== Early life ==
Freddie Roman grew up in Jamaica, New York. His father was a shoe salesman. His uncle and grandfather owned the Crystal Spring Hotel in the Catskills. There, Freddie was given a chance to emcee on summer nights at age 15. He became a teenage comic in small resorts, but later left show business to work for his father. He became the proprietor of a ladies' shoe store, but soon realized his true love was "not in shoe business, but show business".

== Career ==
Roman headlined at resort venues, including Caesars Palace on the Las Vegas Strip and Harrah's Atlantic City. He continued to perform, well into his later years.

The Friars Club changed their two-term maximum bylaw so Roman could stay on as its dean. He was, ultimately, succeeded by Larry King, who was the next dean of The Friars Club.

Roman co-wrote, and starred in, the stage show Catskills on Broadway and also appeared in several films.

== Personal life and death ==
Roman resided in Boynton Beach, Florida.

His son was Alan Kirschenbaum, a television producer, who died in 2012. Roman died in Boynton Beach, on November 26, 2022, at the age of 85.

== Filmography ==
=== Films ===
- Welcome to Kutsher's: The Last Catskills Resort (2012)
- The Last Laugh (2006)
- Bittersweet Place (2005)
- Christ in the City (2005)
- Finding North (1998)
- Sweet Lorraine (1987)

=== Television appearances ===
- The Big Room for MTV's Ha!
- Friars Club Roasts
- Funny Already: A History of Jewish Comedy
- Law & Order: Criminal Intent
- Now That's Funny!
- Stark Raving Mad
- The Tonight Show Starring Johnny Carson
- The 46th Annual Tony Awards (presenter)
- Red Oaks (Amazon.com) - 18 episodes

=== Stage ===
- Catskills on Broadway (2003)
- Sunrise Lakes Phase IV (2010)
