= A-F-R-O POLO =

EP by A-F-R-O and Marco Polo
- Released: July 15, 2016
- Recorded: 2015–2016
- Studio: Marco's Lab
- Genres: Hip-hop, underground hip-hop
- Length: 26 minutes
- Label: Duck Down Records

A-F-R-O POLO is a collaborative EP by American rapper A-F-R-O and Canadian hip-hop record producer Marco Polo. It was released on July 15, 2016, by Duck Down Records.

== Background ==
A-F-R-O connected with Marco Polo via R.A. the Rugged Man, after A-F-R-O listed Polo on his list of producers to work with. A-F-R-O started recording songs like Long Time Comin' in California, but the pair finished the rest of the EP in Polo's Brooklyn studio. The first single Long Time Comin' was released on June 13, 2016.

A-F-R-O POLO has amassed nearly 10,000,000 streams worldwide, and is considered an underground success.

== Critical reception ==
A-F-R-O POLO received positive reviews from music critics.

Vibe magazine wrote "A-F-R-O sounds off with takes his intermediate rhyming skills to a whole new level over Polo’s piano minor chords, distorted vocals, and hard drums." Acclaim magazine said of the song Joe Jackson, "This is easily the best song on the EP, with a laid-back tempo that gives dude room to breathe."

Subjective Sounds wrote "From a sonic perspective, A-F-R-O POLO is magnificent with a soundstage that grows as you increase the volume and doesn’t distort. The separation between elements is also superb.... A-F-R-O POLO is incredibly dynamic".

Professional ratings
Review scores
Source	Rating
What's the Movement	4.7/5
HipHopDX	3.5/5

== Track listing ==
All tracks are written by James Gutierrez, Marco Bruno.

No.	Title	Length
1.	"Long Time Comin'"
2.	"Nightmare on FRO Street"
3.	"Swarm" (featuring Pharoahe Monch)
4.	"Sunshine & Flowers"
5.	"FRO Armstrong"
6.	"Use These Blues" (featuring Eamon)
7.	"Lair of the Black Worm"
8.	"Joe Jackson"
