= No More Patience (EP) =

EP by A-F-R-O
- Released: December 12, 2025
- Recorded: 2014–2025
- Studio: The Lair of FRO Thizzle
- Genre: Hip-Hop/Rap
- Length: 29 minutes
- Label: FRO Thizzle Productions
- Producers: A-F-R-O; Erick Sermon; Alcapella; DJ City Rich; D-ski The Illeagle; Trashdiggah; Tape Flip

A-F-R-O chronology
AFRODEEZEAK 3 (2025)	No More Patience (2025)	Blood Rain (A-F-R-O EP) (2026)

No More Patience is the eighth solo EP by American rapper A-F-R-O. It was released on December 12, 2025 by FRO Thizzle Productions. The EP features guest appearances from Illa Ghee, Rim, Johnny Smoke, Pulse Reaction, Dahliam, and DJ City Rich.

== Background ==
A-F-R-O started development on No More Patience in late 2024, and approached this project with a darker, aggressive tone.

In 2014, A-F-R-O connected with Erick Sermon, who gave him multiple beats to pick from. A-F-R-O then made a track originally titled "U Ain't F*****' With Me." It was eventually re-recorded and released on this EP, a decade later, titled "U Ain't."

== Critical reception ==
Professional ratings
Review scores
Source	Rating
Legends Will Never Die	3.5/5

No More Patience was met with good reviews from music critics.

Insomniac Magazine wrote, "A-F-R-O is better than ever & he has “No More Patience” for the wack artists infiltrating the industry!"

Legends Will Never Die said "No More Patience...will still satisfy many hardcore hip hop fans who've stuck around for the past decade."

== Track listing ==
All tracks are written by James Gutierrez.

All credits adapted from Apple Music.
No.	Title	Music	Length
1.	"Intro / Who's Dat (feat. DJ City Rich)"	DJ City Rich, A-F-R-O	3:33
2.	"Cross da Line"	D-ski The Illeagle	3:07
3.	"NBNA"	Alcapella	2:37
4.	"Hills Have Eyes (feat. Illa Ghee & Rim)"	Alcapella	3:46
5.	"U Ain't (feat. DJ Ace the Cut Lieutenant)"	Erick Sermon	3:26
6.	"Cyanide (feat. Johnny Smoke & Pulse Reaction)"	Alcapella	3:02
7.	"Things I Do (feat. Dahliam)"	A-F-R-O	4:18
8.	"Da Formula"	Tape Flip	2:47
9.	"Sittin' on Top ov da World"	Trashdiggah, A-F-R-O	3:02
Total length:			29 minutes
