= MotionPlus (rapper) =

American rapper

- Born: William Sterns; Quincy, Illinois
- Known for: Rapper, writer, producer
- Notable work: "FOCUS," "Antiquity"

William Sterns, known professionally as MotionPlus, and formerly as MP Ancient, is an American Christian rapper, writer, and producer.

== Background ==
Sterns was born in Quincy, Illinois, and was raised primarily by his grandmother. She died of cancer in December 1989, when Sterns was 14 years old. After her death, he went to live with his mother and stepfather. Sterns has described this period as unstable and marked by significant personal hardship during his adolescence. During this time, he struggled academically and behaviorally at school.

By his mid-teens, Sterns was living intermittently with friends. Music became an increasingly central focus in his life, and he began dedicating himself more seriously to writing and pursuing hip hop.

Sterns was introduced to hip hop culture in 1981 by a cousin who worked at a local college radio station. One of the earliest records to influence him was Planet Rock, which sparked his interest in hip hop culture, including breakdancing and lyric writing. He wrote his first song as a tribute to his grandmother and continued writing music as a response to his life experiences.

== Music career ==
As a seasoned hip-hop artist, MotionPlus is known for his deep lyricism and signature boom-bap sound. In 2005, MotionPlus signed with Syntax Records while later collaborating with other labels such as End of Earth, Illect, Jim's Pool Room, and War Records. Known as a member of the Scribbling Idiots, MotionPlus continues to craft gritty, soulful, and thought-provoking hip hop as part of the Polished Arrow Music collective.

MotionPlus has collaborated on numerous occasions with rapper/producer A-F-R-O, including two LPs "FOCUS," and "Antiquity."

On June 26, 2026, MotionPlus released a collaborative album with A-F-R-O titled Frequencies.

== Critical reception ==
In 2026, MotionPlus was nominated for Breakout Artist of the Year and Best Song of the Year for his 2025 track "Legacy." by RapZilla.

== Discography ==
=== Studio albums ===
The Sound Protest
- Released: 2007
- Label: ESeye Music
Heart on My Sleeve
- Released: 2009
- Label: ESeye Music
SoulSonicStimulation
- Released: 2013
- Label: EyeSeye Music
Sound Protest 2
- Released: 2015
FOCUS
- Released: January 31, 2025
- Label: FRO Thizzle Productions / SOLFEEDER
- Completely produced by: A-F-R-O
Antiquity
- Released: December 5, 2025
- Label: FRO Thizzle Productions / SOLFEEDER
- Completely produced by A-F-R-O

=== EPs ===
War Scars
- Released: 2010
Golden Rule
- Released: 2010
Heirlooms
- Released: 2018
Dark Alley Concerto
- Released: 2021
Improper Decorum
- Released: July 18, 2025
- Label: The SoulFeed / Polished Arrow

=== Collaborative albums ===
==== MP Ancient collaborations ====
No Expiration Date with Grungy Boguez

Released: 2016

==== Scribbling Idiots (Group albums) ====
The Have Nots
- Released: 2007
- Label: Illect Records
Invitation Only
- Released: 2014
- Label: Illect Records
Good Morning Mourning
- Released: 2016
- Label: EyeSeye Music

==== Other collaborations ====
SomeBuddies with Cas Metah
- Released: April 21, 2009
- Label: ILLECT Recordings
Frequencies with A-F-R-O
- Released: June 26, 2026
- Label: FRO Thizzle Productions / The Soul Feed

=== Compilations ===
Oddz and Endz, Vol. 1
- Released: 2016

== Awards and nominations ==
=== RapZilla ===
Year	Category	Result
2025	Breakout Artist of the Year	Nominated
2025	Best Song of the Year for his 2025 track "Legacy."	Nominated
