= The Photo Album (Wordsworth album) =

Studio album by Wordsworth
- Released: June 12, 2012
- Recorded: 2011–2012
- Genre: Hip hop
- Length: 62:39
- Label: Worldwide Communications
- Producer: Apollo Brown, Belief, Dave Notti, Hezekiah, Frequency, mananz (Archbishop), Frequency, Thir(13)teen, Ervin L. Ford III, Ill Poetic, Skeematics, Style MiSia, TzariZM, The ARE (of K-Otix)

Wordsworth chronology
| Mirror Music Deluxe (2006) | The Photo Album (2012) | New Beginning (2015) |

Professional ratings
Review scores
| Source | Rating |
|---|---|
| Emusic | 4/5 stars |

The Photo Album is the follow-up studio album to the critically acclaimed Mirror Music album by hip-hop artist Wordsworth. It features Torae, Range Da Messenger and fellow eMC members, Masta Ace & Punchline. The album is produced by Apollo Brown, The Are, Tzarism, Frequency, Hezekiah. The Album also features production by South African producers, Thir(13)teen and mananz(Archbishop)

== Track listing ==
| # | Title | Producer(s) | Performer(s) |
|---|---|---|---|
| 1 | "Destiny" | The Are | Wordsworth, Adanita Ross |
| 2 | "Until I Win" | Hezekiah | Range Da Messenger, Wordsworth |
| 3 | "Betrayed" | Skeematics | Skeematics, Wordsworth |
| 4 | "Mirror Mirror" | Hezekiah | Wordsworth |
| 5 | "Coloring Book" | The Are (of K-Otix) | Meleni Smith, Wordsworth |
| 6 | "Vendetta" | TzariZM | DV Alias Khryst, Torae, Wordsworth |
| 7 | "Knock On My Door" | Ervin L. Ford III | Wordsworth |
| 8 | "Don't Settle" | Frequency | Wordsworth |
| 9 | "Joy & Pain" | Apollo Brown | Wordsworth |
| 10 | "Start Over" | mananz (Archbishop) | Range Da Messenger, Wordsworth |
| 11 | "Big Dreamer" | Style MiSia | Wordsworth |
| 12 | "911" | Dave Notti | Torae, Wordsworth |
| 13 | "The Oldest" | Belief | Wordsworth |
| 14 | "Feel Me" | ill Poetic | Wordsworth |
| 15 | "All I Knew" | | Wordsworth |
| 16 | "Vanish" | Apollo Brown | Punchline, Masta Ace, Wordsworth |
| 17 | "Reach (Bonus)" | Dave Notti | Wordsworth |
| 18 | "No Need To Explain (Bonus)" | Thir(13)teen | Wordsworth |

== Album Chart Positions ==
| Year | Album | Chart positions | | |
| Year | Album | Billboard 200 | Top R&B/Hip Hop Albums | Top Heatseekers |
| 2012 | The Photo Album | - | - | - |

== Singles Chart Positions ==
| Year | Song | Chart positions | |
|---|---|---|---|
| Year | Song | Hot R&B/Hip-Hop Singles & Tracks | Hot Rap Singles |
| 2012 | "Joy & Pain" | - | |

== Sources ==
- "Wordsworth: The Photo Album". ughh.com. March 23, 2012.
- "Wordsworth, The Photo Album". xxlmag.com. June 9, 2012.
- "The Photo Album by Wordsworth". koolout.co.za. June 24, 2012.
