= DJ Premier production discography =

The following list contains songs produced, co-produced or remixed by hip-hop producer DJ Premier.

== 1989 ==
=== Gang Starr - No More Mr. Nice Guy ===
- 01. "Premier & The Guru"
- 02. "Jazz Music"
- 03. "Gotch U"
- 04. "Manifest"
- 06. "DJ Premier in Deep Concentration"
- 07. "Positivity (Remix)"
- 08. "Words I Manifest (Remix)"
- 09. "Conscience Be Free"
- 10. "Cause and Effect"
- 11. "2 Steps Ahead"
- 12. "No More Mr. Nice Guy"
- 14. "Positivity"

=== Lord Finesse & DJ Mike Smooth - 12" ===
- A1. "Baby You Nasty (Vocal)"
- B1. "Track the Movement (Vocal)"

== 1990 ==
=== Lord Finesse & DJ Mike Smooth - Funky Technician ===
- 01. "Lord Finesse's Theme Song Intro" (featuring Grandpa Finesse)
- 02. "Baby, You Nasty (New Version)"
- 06. "Slave to My Soundwave" {co-produced by DJ Mike Smooth}
- 10. "A Lesson to Be Taught"
- 12. "Strictly for the Ladies" (featuring Patricia (Chocolate))
- 13. "Track the Movement"

=== Lord Finesse & DJ Mike Smooth - 12" ===
- A1. "Strictly for the Ladies (Radio Remix)"
- B1. "Back to Back Rhyming (Vocal Remix)" [featuring A.G.]

=== Kool DJ Red Alert - (Part 3) Let's Make It Happen ===
- 08. "Red Alert Chant"

=== Branford Marsalis Quartet - Mo' Better Blues (soundtrack) ===
- 08. "Jazz Thing" -- [Gang Starr] {co-produced by Branford Marsalis}

=== Gang Starr - Step in the Arena ===
- 01. "Name Tag (Premier & The Guru)"
- 02. "Step in the Arena"
- 03. "Form of Intellect"
- 04. "Execution of a Chump (No More Mr. Nice Guy Pt. 2)"
- 05. "Who's Gonna Take the Weight?"
- 06. "Beyond Comprehension"
- 07. "Check the Technique"
- 08. "Lovesick"
- 09. "Here Today, Gone Tomorrow"
- 10. "Game Plan"
- 11. "Take a Rest"
- 12. "What You Want This Time?"
- 13. "Street Ministry"
- 14. "Just to Get a Rep"
- 15. "Say Your Prayers"
- 16. "As I Read My S-A"
- 17. "Precisely the Right Rhymes"
- 18. "The Meaning of the Name"

== 1991 ==
=== Gang Starr - 12" ===
- A1. "Lovesick (Extended Mix)"
- B2. "Credit Is Due"

=== Slam Slam - 12" ===
- A2. "Free Your Feelings (Gifted Mix)" [feat. Guru]

=== Subsonic 2 - Include Me Out ===
- 12. "Dedicated to the City" (featuring Keith E) {The Gang Starr Mix} | co-produced by Guru and Subsonic 2
- 19. "Regardless" | co-produced by Guru, Subsonic 2 and MG Bad

=== Ice-T - 12" ===
- A1. "Lifestyles of the Rich and Infamous (Remix)"

=== J Rock - Streetwize ===
- 04. "Brutality"
- 05. "The Pimp"
- 11. "Ghetto Law"
- 14. "The Real One"
- 20. "Neighborhood Drug Dealer (DJ Premier Remix)" [Bonus Track]

=== Cookie Crew - Fade to Black ===
- 09. "A Word to the Conscious" | co-produced by Guru

=== Dream Warriors - 12" ===
- A1. "I Lost My Ignorance (And Don't Know Where to Find It) [Original Mix]" {featuring Gang Starr} | co-produced by Guru and Dream Warriors
- A2. "I Lost My Ignorance (And Don't Know Where to Find It) [Gang Starr Remix]" {featuring Gang Starr} | co-produced by Guru

=== MC Solaar - 12" ===
- A2. "Qui Sème Le Vent Récolte Le Tempo" (Gang Starr Mix) [feat. Guru]

=== Wendy & Lisa - Re-Mix-In-A-Carnation ===
- 05. "Satisfaction (Gang Starr Remix)" [featuring Guru]

== 1992 ==
=== Soul II Soul - Just Right 12" ===
- B2. "Intelligence (Jazzie II Guru Mix)" [feat. Guru] | co-produced by Guru

=== Various Artists - Trespass (soundtrack) ===
- 08. "Gotta Get Over (Taking Loot)" -- Gang Starr

=== Various Artists - White Men Can't Rap (soundtrack) ===
- 06. "Now You're Mine" -- Gang Starr

=== Gang Starr - Daily Operation ===
- 01. "Daily Operation (Intro)"
- 02. "The Place Where We Dwell"
- 03. "Flip the Script"
- 04. "Ex Girl to Next Girl"
- 05. "Soliloquy of Chaos"
- 06. "I'm the Man" (featuring Lil Dap & Jeru the Damaja)
- 07. "’92 Interlude"
- 08. "Take It Personal"
- 09. "2 Deep"
- 10. "24-7/365"
- 11. "No Shame in My Game"
- 12. "Conspiracy"
- 13. "The Illest Brother"
- 14. "Hardcore Composer"
- 15. "B.Y.S."
- 16. "Much Too Much (Mack a Mil)"
- 17. "Take Two and Pass"
- 18. "Stay Tuned"

=== Take It Personal / DWYCK 12" ===
- B1. "DWYCK" (featuring Nice & Smooth)

=== Loose Ends - Tighten Up Vol. 1 ===
- 05. "A Little Spice (Gang Starr Remix)" [feat. Guru] | co-produced by Guru

=== Compton's Most Wanted - 12" ===
- A1. "Def Wish II (East Coast Gang Starr Re-Mix)"

=== Too Short - 12" ===
- B1. "In the Trunk (Glove Compartment Radio Mix)"

=== Mobb Deep - 12" ===
- A1. "Peer Pressure"

=== Neneh Cherry - Homebrew ===
- 01. "Sassy" (featuring Guru) | co-produced by Guru
- 04. "I Ain't Gone Under Yet" | co-produced by Guru, Booga Bear, Johnny Dollar and Neneh Cherry

=== Heavy D & the Boyz - Blue Funk ===
- 10. "Here Comes the Heavster"
- 12. "Yes Y'all"

== 1993 ==
=== Les Négresses Vertes - 10 Remixes (87-93) ===
- 6. "Voila L'Ete (Inedit) (Gangstarr & LNV Remix)" (co-remixed by Guru and Les Négresses Vertes)

=== Mobb Deep - Juvenile Hell ===
- 04. "Peer Pressure" {original release: 1992}

=== Da Youngsta's - The Aftermath ===
- 13. "Wake 'Em Up"

=== Da King & I - Krak da Weazel 12" ===
- B3. "Flip da Scrip (Remix)"

=== Das EFX - 12" ===
- A1. "Kaught in da Ak (Remix)"

=== Marxman - 33 Revolutions per Minute ===
- 09. "Drifting" | co-produced by Guru

=== Various Artists - Menace II Society (soundtrack) ===
- 12. "'P' Is Still Free" -- Boogie Down Productions

=== KRS-One - Return of the Boom Bap ===
- 01. "KRS-One Attacks"
- 02. "Outta Here"
- 04. "Mortal Thought"
- 05. "I Can't Wake Up" {co-produced by KRS-One}
- 12. "'P' Is Still Free"
- 14. "Higher Level"

=== Red Fox - As a Matter of Fox ===
- 14. "Ya Can't Test Me Again"

=== Various Artists - Relativity Rap Up Sampler Vol. 2 ===
- 5. "No Surrender, No Retreat"—Chi Ali

=== Jeru the Damaja - 12" ===
- A1. "Come Clean"

=== Shyheim - 12" ===
- A3. "On and On (Premier Remix)"

== 1994 ==
=== Nas - Illmatic ===
- 02. "N.Y. State of Mind"
- 06. "Memory Lane (Sittin' in da Park)"
- 09. "Represent"

=== Gang Starr - Hard to Earn ===
- 01. "Intro (The First Step)"
- 02. "ALONGWAYTOGO"
- 03. "Code of the Streets"
- 04. "Brainstorm"
- 05. "Tonz 'O' Gunz"
- 06. "The Planet"
- 07. "Aiiight Chill..."
- 08. "Speak Ya Clout" (featuring Jeru the Damaja and Lil' Dap)
- 09. "DWYCK" (featuring Nice & Smooth) {original release: 1992}
- 10. "Words from the Nutcracker" (featuring Malachi the Nutcracker)
- 11. "Mass Appeal"
- 12. "Blowin' Up the Spot"
- 13. "Suckas Need Bodyguards"
- 14. "Now You're Mine" {original release: 1992}
- 15. "Mostly tha Voice"
- 16. "F.A.L.A." (featuring Big Shug)
- 17. "Comin' for Datazz"

=== Suckas Need Bodyguards 12" ===
- B2. "The ? Remainz"

=== M.O.P. - 12" ===
- B1. "Rugged Neva Smoove (Premier Remix)"
- D2. "Downtown Swinga"

=== Jeru the Damaja - The Sun Rises in the East ===
- 01. "Intro (Life)"
- 02. "D. Original"
- 03. "Brooklyn Took It"
- 04. "Perverted Monks in tha House (skit)"
- 05. "Mental Stamina" (featuring Afu-Ra)
- 06. "Da Bichez"
- 07. "You Can't Stop the Prophet"
- 08. "Perverted Monks in tha House (Theme)"
- 09. "Ain't the Devil Happy"
- 10. "My Mind Spray"
- 11. "Come Clean" {original release: 1993}
- 12. "Jungle Music"
- 13. "Statik"

=== Buckshot LeFonque - Buckshot LeFonque ===
- 01. "Ladies & Gentlemen, Presenting..." {co-produced by Branford Marsalis}
- 02. "The Blackwidow Blues" (featuring The Lady of Rage) {co-produced by Branford Marsalis}
- 05. "Wonders & Signs" (featuring Blackheart) {co-produced by Branford Marsalis}
- 08. "Some Shit @ 78 BPM (The Scratch Opera)"
- 09. "Hotter Than Hot" (featuring Blackheart) {co-produced by Blackheart}
- 11. "Breakfast @ Denny's" {co-produced by Branford Marsalis}
- 13. "No Pain, No Gain" {co-produced by Branford Marsalis}
- 15. "...And We Out" {co-produced by Branford Marsalis}
- 16. "Breakfast @ Denny's (Uptown Version)" [Bonus Track]

=== Big Daddy Kane - Daddy's Home ===
- 04. "Show & Prove" (featuring Big Scoop, J.Z., Ol' Dirty Bastard, Sauce & Shyheim)

=== The Notorious B.I.G. - Ready to Die ===
- 16. "Unbelievable"

=== Omar - 12" ===
- A3. "Keep Steppin' (D.J. Premier Mix)" [featuring Uptown]

=== Various Artists - Kickin da Flava ===
- 03. "Ease My Mind (Premier's Radio)" - Arrested Development

=== Dream Warriors - Subliminal Simulation ===
- 05. "It's a Project Thing" {co-produced by Dream Warriors}
- 07. "I've Lost My Ignorance" (featuring Guru) | co-produced by Guru and Dream Warriors {original release: 1991}

== 1995 ==
=== Big Shug - 12" ===
- A1. "Treat U Better" | co-produced by Guru

=== Guru - Jazzmatazz, Vol. 2: The New Reality ===
- 05. "Watch What You Say" (featuring Chaka Khan and Branford Marsalis) | co-produced by Guru

=== Showbiz and A.G. - Goodfellas ===
- 05. "Next Level (Nyte Time Mix)"

=== Various Artists - Clockers (soundtrack) ===
- 05. "Return of the Crooklyn Dodgers" --- Crooklyn Dodgers '95 - Chubb Rock, O.C. and Jeru the Damaja

=== Bahamadia - Uknowhowwedo 12" ===
- A5. "True Honey Buns (Dat Freak Shit)" [featuring Lil' Cess]

=== Bone Thugs-n-Harmony - 12" ===
- A1. "1st of tha Month (DJ Premier's Phat Bonus Remix)"

=== Blahzay Blahzay - 12" ===
- B1. "Danger (Street Mix)"

=== Various Artists - New Jersey Drive, Vol. 2 (soundtrack) ===
- "Invasion" -- Jeru the Damaja

=== Fat Joe - Jealous One's Envy ===
- 08. "The Shit Is Real (DJ Premier Remix)" {original release: 1994}
- 13. "Success (DJ Premier Remix)"

=== Das EFX - Hold It Down ===
- 02. "No Diggedy"
- 05. "Real Hip Hop (Original Version)"

=== KRS-One - KRS-One ===
- 01. "Rappaz R. N. Dainja"
- 03. "MC's Act Like They Don't Know"
- 08. "Wannabemceez" (featuring Mad Lion)

=== Scha Dara Parr - The Cycle Hits-Remix Best Collection ===
- 03. "Cracker MC's (DJ Premier Remix)"

=== Group Home - Livin' Proof ===
- 01. "Intro"
- 02. "Inna Citi Life"
- 03. "Livin' Proof"
- 05. "Suspended in Time"
- 06. "Sacrifice" (featuring Absaloot)
- 07. "Up Against the Wall (Low Budget Mix)"
- 09. "Baby Pa"
- 10. "2 Thousand"
- 11. "Supa Star"
- 12. "Up Against the Wall (Getaway Car Mix)"
- 13. "Tha Realness" (featuring Smiley the Ghetto Child and Brainsick Enterprize)

=== Various Artists - Pump Ya Fist (Hip Hop Inspired by the Black Panthers) ===
- 05. "The Frustrated Nigga" -- Jeru the Damaja {co-produced by Jeru}

=== Various Artists - The D&D Project ===
- 01. "1, 2 Pass It" (D&D All-Stars - Doug E. Fresh, Fat Joe, Jeru the Damaja, KRS-One, Mad Lion and Smif-n-Wessun)

=== The D&D All-Stars - 12" ===
- B1. "1, 2 Pass It (Remix)" [D&D All-Stars]

== 1996 ==
=== Guru - 12" ===
- A2. "Lifesaver (DJ Premier Remix)"

=== Group Home - 12" ===
- A1. "Suspended in Time (Groovy Remix Street)" [featuring Groove Theory]

=== Big Shug - 12" ===
- A1. "Crush"

=== Bahamadia - Kollage ===
- 01. "Intro"
- 04. "Rugged Ruff"
- 05. "Interlude"
- 13. "True Honey Buns (Dat Freak Shit)" [featuring Lil' Cess] {original release: 1995}
- 14. "3 tha Hard Way" (featuring K-Swift and Mecca Star)

=== Jay-Z - Reasonable Doubt ===
- 06. "D'Evils"
- 10. "Friend or Foe"
- 13. "Bring It On" (featuring Big Jaz and Sauce Money)

=== D'Angelo - 12" ===
- A1. "Lady (Street Version)" [featuring AZ]
- B1. "Me and Those Dreamin' Eyes of Mine (Two Way Street Mix)"

=== Nas - It Was Written ===
- 04. "I Gave You Power"

=== M.O.P. - Firing Squad ===
- 01. "Intro"
- 03. "Firing Squad" (featuring Teflon)
- 04. "New Jack City" (featuring Teflon)
- 05. "Stick to Ya Gunz" (featuring Kool G Rap)
- 08. "Brownsville"
- 09. "Salute"
- 11. "Downtown Swinga ('96)"

=== Special Ed - 12" ===
- A2. "Freaky Flow (DJ Premier Street Version)"

=== Jeru the Damaja - Wrath of the Math ===
- 01. "Wrath of the Math"
- 02. "Tha Frustrated Nigga" {original release: 1995}
- 03. "Black Cowboys"
- 04. "Tha Bullshit"
- 05. "Whatever"
- 06. "Physical Stamina" (featuring Afu-Ra)
- 07. "One Day"
- 08. "Revenge of the Prophet (Part 5)"
- 09. "Scientifical Madness"
- 10. "Not the Average"
- 11. "Me or the Papes"
- 12. "How I'm Livin'"
- 13. "Too Perverted"
- 14. "Ya Playin' Yaself"
- 15. "Invasion" {original release: 1995}

=== Rawcotiks - 12" ===
- B1. "Hardcore Hip-Hop (Street Mix II)"

== 1997 ==
=== Jeru the Damaja - Me or the Papes 12" ===
- B2. "Me, Not the Paper"

=== The Notorious B.I.G. - Life After Death ===
- 1-04. "Kick in the Door" (featuring The Madd Rapper)
- 2-05. "Ten Crack Commandments"

=== Buckshot LeFonque - 12" ===
- A1. "Music Evolution (DJ Premier Version)"

=== Howie B - 12" ===
- A3. "Take Your Partner by the Hand (DJ Premier Remix)"

=== The Lady of Rage - Necessary Roughness ===
- 11. "Some Shit"
- 12. "Microphone Pon Cok" (featuring Madd 1)

=== Various Artists - Soul in the Hole (soundtrack) ===
- 03. "Against the Grain" -- Sauce Money

=== Janet Jackson - 12" ===
- A4. "Together Again" (DJ Premier 100 in a 50 Remix)
- A5.. "Together Again" (DJ Premier Just the Bass Vocal)

=== O.C. - Jewelz ===
- 02. "My World"
- 03. "War Games" (featuring Organized Konfusion)
- 07. "Win the G" (featuring Bumpy Knuckles)
- 10. "M.U.G." (featuring Freddie Foxxx)

=== D.I.T.C. - Internationally Known 12" ===
- A3. "Da Enemy" -- Big L & Fat Joe

=== Gang Starr - You Know My Steez 12" ===
- B1. "So Wassup?"

=== Krumbsnatcha - 12" ===
- A1. "Closer to God"

=== Zeebra - マイクの刺客 12" ===
- B1. "The Untouchable"

=== Jay-Z - In My Lifetime, Vol. 1 ===
- 01. "Intro / A Million and One Questions / Rhyme No More"
- 06. "Friend or Foe '98"

=== Rakim - The 18th Letter ===
- 04. "It's Been a Long Time"
- 10. "New York (Ya Out There)"

== 1998 ==
=== Jay-Z - 12" ===
- B1. "A Million and One Questions (Premier Remix)"

=== Various Artists - Tommy Boy's Greatest Beats 1981 - 1996 ===
- 5-02. "Wrath of My Madness (DJ Premier Remix)"-- Queen Latifah

=== Gang Starr - Moment of Truth ===
- 01. "You Know My Steez"
- 02. "Robbin Hood Theory"
- 03. "Work"
- 04. "Royalty" (featuring K-Ci & JoJo)
- 05. "Above the Clouds" (featuring Inspectah Deck)
- 06. "JFK 2 LAX"
- 07. "Itz a Set Up" (featuring Hannibal Stax)
- 08. "Moment of Truth"
- 09. "B.I. vs Friendship" (featuring M.O.P.)
- 10. "The Militia" (featuring Big Shug, Freddie Foxxx)
- 11. "The Rep Grows Bigga"
- 12. "What I'm Here 4"
- 13. "She Knowz What She Wantz"
- 14. "New York Strait Talk"
- 15. "My Advice 2 You"
- 16. "Make 'Em Pay" (featuring Krumbsnatcha)
- 17. The Mall" (featuring G-Dep, Shiggy Sha)
- 18. "Betrayal" (featuring Scarface)
- 19. Next Time"
- 20. "In Memory Of..."

=== The Militia 12" ===
- B1. "You Know My Steez (Three Men and a Lady Remix)" [featuring The Lady of Rage & Kurupt]

=== Various Artists - Blade (soundtrack) ===
- 02. "1/2 & 1/2" -- Gang Starr & M.O.P.

=== Funkmaster Flex - The Mix Tape Volume III 60 Minutes of Funk (The Final Chapter) ===
- 20. "Freestyle" -- Gang Starr

=== Robbie Robertson - Contact from the Underworld of Redboy ===
- 11. "Take Your Partner by the Hand (Red Alert Mix)" {original release: 1997}

=== M.O.P. - First Family 4 Life ===
- 02. "Breakin' the Rules"
- 08. "I Luv" (featuring Freddie Foxxx)
- 09. "Salute Part II" (featuring Gang Starr)
- 11. "Handle Ur Bizness (DJ Premier Remix)"
- 14. "Downtown Swinga '98"

=== All City - Metropolis Gold ===
- 07. "The Actual"

=== Paula Perry - 12" ===
- A2. "Extra, Extra!! (LP Version)" [featuring Nikki D and Que 45 {Que?}]

=== Cheyenne - 12" ===
- B1. "Feel My Love (DJ Premier Remix)"

=== Jermaine Dupri - Life in 1472 ===
- 12. "Protectors of 1472" (featuring Snoop Dogg, Warren G and R.O.C.)

=== Fat Joe - Don Cartagena ===
- 09. "Dat Gangsta Shit"

=== Jay-Z - Vol. 2... Hard Knock Life ===
- 01. "Intro - Hand It Down" (featuring Memphis Bleek)

=== Various Artists - Belly (soundtrack) ===
- 02. "Devil's Pie" -- D'Angelo
- 13. "Militia (Remix)" -- Gang Starr, WC, Rakim

=== Brand Nubian - Foundation ===
- 02. "The Return"

== 1999 ==
=== Gang Starr - Full Clip: A Decade of Gang Starr ===
- 1-02. "Full Clip"
- 1-03. "Discipline" (featuring Total)
- 2-01. "All 4 tha Ca$h"

=== Nas - I Am... ===
- 02. "N.Y. State of Mind Pt. II"
- 13. "Nas Is Like"

=== D.I.T.C. - 12" ===
- A1. "Thick"

=== A.G. - The Dirty Version ===
- 09. "Weed Scented" (featuring O.C., Mr. Mudd and Guru)

=== Teflon - 12" ===
- A1. "F-U"
- B1. "Comin' at Cha"

=== Tony Touch #60 - Power Cypha 3 (The Grand Finale) ===
- 2-22. "Freestyle" - performed by Council {Beat taken from "One Day" - Jeru the Damaja}

=== Group Home - A Tear for the Ghetto ===
- 06. "The Legacy" (featuring Guru)

=== Limp Bizkit - Significant Other ===
- 02. "N 2 Gether Now" (featuring Method Man) {co-produced by Terry Date and Limp Bizkit}

=== Various Artists - Black Mask (soundtrack) ===
- 04. "F.A.Y.B.A.N." -- Screwball

=== Charli Baltimore - Cold As Ice ===
- 06. "Everybody Wanna Know"

=== Brandy - U Don't Know Me (Like U Used To) - The Remix EP ===
- 02. "Almost Doesn't Count" (DJ Premier Mix)"

=== Tin Tin Out - 12" ===
- B2. "What I Am (Gang Starr Remix)" [feat. Emma Bunton]

=== Truck - Symphony 2000 12" ===
- B2. "Who Am I"

=== Breaker One 12" ===
- A2. "Breaker One"
- B2. "Bring It to the Cypher" (featuring KRS-One)

=== Mos Def - Black on Both Sides ===
- 16. "Mathematics"

=== Nas - Nastradamus ===
- 06. "Come Get Me"

=== Rakim - The Master ===
- 03. "When I B on tha Mic"
- 16. "Waiting for the World to End"

=== Afu-Ra - 12" ===
- A1. Defeat

=== The Notorious B.I.G. - Born Again ===
- 11. "Rap Phenomenon" (featuring Method Man & Redman)

=== Jay-Z - Vol. 3... Life and Times of S. Carter ===
- 02. "So Ghetto"

== 2000 ==
=== Afu-Ra - Body of the Life Force ===
- 03. "Defeat" (original release: 1999)
- 07. "Mic Stance"
- 12. "Visions"
- 15. "Equality" (featuring Ky-Mani)
- 16. "Monotony"

=== Big L - The Big Picture ===
- 01. "The Big Picture (Intro)"
- 08. "The Enemy" (featuring Fat Joe) {original release: 1997}
- 12. "Platinum Plus" (featuring Big Daddy Kane)

=== Black Eyed Peas - Bridging the Gap ===
- 01. "BEP Empire"

=== Various Artists - Lyricist Lounge 2 ===
- 17. "I've Committed Murder" -- Macy Gray with Mos Def | co-produced by Guru

=== Bumpy Knuckles - Industry Shakedown ===
- 14. "R.N.S."
- 19. "Part of My Life"

=== Capone-n-Noreaga - The Reunion ===
- 05. "Invincible"

=== Common - Like Water for Chocolate ===
- 09. "The 6th Sense" (featuring Bilal)

=== D'Angelo - Voodoo ===
- 02. "Devil's Pie" (original release: 1998)

=== DJ Cam - 12" ===
- A1. "Voodoo Child (DJ Premier Remix)" (featuring Afu-Ra)

=== D.I.T.C. - D.I.T.C. ===
- 01. "Thick" (original release: 1999)
- 09. "Ebonics (Premo Mix)"
- 11. "Da Enemy" (original release: 1997)

=== Edo. G - The Truth Hurts ===
- 01. "Sayin' Somethin'"

=== Rah Digga - Dirty Harriet ===
- 16. "Lessons of Today"

=== Heather B - 12" ===
- A1. "Guilty"

=== Immobilarie - 12" ===
- A1. 718

=== Guru - Jazzmatazz, Vol. 3: Streetsoul ===
- 03. "Hustlin' Daze" (featuring Donell Jones)
- 12. "Where's My Ladies" (feat. Big Shug) | co-produced by Guru

=== M.O.P. - Warriorz ===
- 01. "Premier Intro"
- 03. "Everyday" (featuring Product G&B)
- 05. "Face Off 2K1"
- 09. "On the Front Line"
- 11. "Follow Instructions"
- 18. "Roll Call"

=== Chauncey Black - 12" ===
- "Shame on You" (co-produced by Chauncey Black)

=== PUSHIM - 12" ===
- A1. "Set Me Free (Main Mix)"

=== Royce da 5′9″ - 12" ===
- A1. "Boom"

=== The Lox - We Are the Streets ===
- 09. "Recognize"

=== Sauce Money - Middle Finger U ===
- 11. "Intruder Alert"

=== Screwball - Y2K The Album ===
- 03. "F.A.Y.B.A.N." (original release: 1999)
- 06. "Seen It All"

=== Sonja Blade - 12" ===
- A1. "Look 4 tha Name"

=== Tony Touch - The Piece Maker ===
- 02. "The Piece Maker" -- Gang Starr

== 2001 ==
=== Afu-Ra - 12" ===
- B1. "Bigacts, Littleacts (Remix)" [featuring GZA]

=== Biz Markie - 12" ===
- A1. "...And I Rock" (featuring Black Indian)

=== Bumpy Knuckles - 12" ===
- 01. "The Lah"

=== Craig David - 12" ===
- A1. "7 Days (DJ Premier Remix)" [featuring Mos Def]

=== Dilated Peoples - Expansion Team ===
- 03. "Clockwork"

=== Guru - Baldhead Slick & da Click ===
- 02. "Back 2 Back" (featuring Mendoughzah

=== J-Live - The Best Part ===
- 16. "The Best Part"

=== Jadakiss - Kiss tha Game Goodbye ===
- 06. "None of Y'all Betta" (featuring The Lox)

=== Kool G Rap - My Life 12" ===
- A2. "First Nigga (Remix)"

=== Various Artists - Training Day (soundtrack) ===
- 13. "Tha Squeeze" -- Gang Starr

=== Janet Jackson - 12" ===
- 1. "All for You" (Top Heavy Remix)

=== Limp Bizkit - New Old Songs ===
- 08. "Getcha Groove On (Dirt Road Mix)" [featuring Xzibit]
- 14. "My Way (DJ Premier Way Remix)"

=== Lina - 12" ===
- A1. "It's Alright (Gang Starr Remix)" | co-produced by Guru

=== Nas - Stillmatic ===
- 08. "2nd Childhood"

== 2002 ==
=== Afu-Ra - Life Force Radio ===
- 07. "Lyrical Monster"
- 17. "Blvd." (featuring Guru)

=== Various Artists - 8 Mile (soundtrack) ===
- 1-15. "Battle" -- Gang Starr

=== Devin the Dude - Just Tryin' ta Live ===
- 11. "Doobie Ashtray"

=== Gang Starr - Skills 12" ===
- B2. "Natural"

=== Jaz-O & The Immobilarie - Kingz Kounty ===
- 01. "718" (original release: 2000)
- 13. "Love Is Gone"

=== Just-Ice - 12" ===
- A1. "Gangsta's Don't Cry"
- B1. "Just Rhymin' with Kane"

=== Krumbsnatcha - Respect All Fear None ===
- 04. "Incredible" (featuring Guru)

=== Heather B - Eternal Affairs ===
- 02. "Steady Rockin"

=== Non Phixion - The Future Is Now ===
- 07. "Rock Stars"

=== NYG'z - 12" ===
- A1. "Giantz ta Thiz"
- B1. "Strength"

=== Ras Kass - 12" ===
- A2. "Goldyn Chyld"

=== Royce da 5'9" - Rock City (Version 2.0) ===
- 04. "My Friend"
- 11. "Boom" (original release: 2000)

=== Snoop Dogg - Paid the Cost to Be the Bo$$ ===
- 13. "The One and Only"
- 18. "Batman & Robin" (featuring The Lady of Rage & RBX)

=== Various Artists - Doggy Style Allstars, Welcome to Tha House, Vol. 1 ===
- 14. "Unfucwitable" - The Lady of Rage

=== The X-Ecutioners - Built from Scratch ===
- 12. "Premier's X-Ecution"

=== Tony Touch - The Last of the Pro Ricans ===
- 07. "Gotcha Back" (featuring Rise & Shine)

=== Xzibit - Man vs. Machine ===
- 2-02. "What a Mess"

== 2003 ==
=== Bumpy Knuckles - Konexion ===
- 03. "Paine (Pressure At INdustry Expense)"
- 13. "Lazy!!!"

=== Craig G - This Is Now!!! ===
- 03. "Ready Set Begin"

=== The Ranjahz - Who Feels It Knows ===
- 03. "Inspiration" (featuring Cee-Lo)

=== Blaq Poet - 12" ===
- A1. "Poet Has Come"
- B1. "Message from Poet"

=== Just-Ice - 12" ===
- A1. "History"
- B1. "Love Rap"

=== Big Daddy Kane - 12" ===
- A1. "Any Type of Way"

=== Gang Starr - The Ownerz ===
- 01. "Intro (HQ, Goo, Panch)"
- 02. "Put Up or Shut Up" (featuring Krumbsnatcha)
- 03. "Werdz from the Ghetto Child" (featuring Smiley the Ghetto Child)
- 04. "Sabotage"
- 05. "Rite Where U Stand" (featuring Jadakiss)
- 06. "Skills"
- 07. "Deadly Habitz"
- 08. "Nice Girl, Wrong Place" (featuring Boy Big)
- 09. "Peace of Mine"
- 10. "Who Got Gunz" (featuring Fat Joe & M.O.P.)
- 11. "Capture (Militia Pt. 3)" (featuring Big Shug & Freddie Foxxx)
- 12. "PLAYTAWIN"
- 13. "Riot Akt"
- 14. "(Hiney)"
- 15. "Same Team, No Games" (featuring NYG'z & H. Stax)
- 16. "In This Life..." (featuring Snoop Dogg & Uncle Reo)
- 17. "The Ownerz"
- 18. "Zonin'"
- 19. "Eulogy"

== 2004 ==
=== CeeLo Green - Cee-Lo Green... Is the Soul Machine ===
- 11. "Evening News" (featuring Chazzie & Sir Cognac the Conversation)

=== Royce Da 5'9" - Death Is Certain ===
- 07. "Hip Hop"

=== Pitch Black - Pitch Black Law {mixtape} ===
- 03. "It's All Real"
- 10. "Got It Locked" (featuring Foxy Brown)

=== Freddie Foxxx - Turn Up the Mic 12" ===
- B1. "Teach the Children"

=== Hasstyle - BX-TRA ===
- 02. "Projects" (featuring Shinobi #7)

=== Ol' Dirty Bastard - Osirus {mixtape} ===
- 01. "Pop Shots (Wu-Tang)"

=== The Marxmen - Marxmen Cinema {mixtape} ===
- 1-04. "Bloody Murdah"

=== Proof - I Miss the Hip Hop Shop {mixtape} ===
- 12. "Play with Myself" (Freestyle) {Beat reused from "Ya Playin' Yaself" - Jeru the Damaja}

== 2005 ==
=== Afu-Ra - State of the Arts ===
- 13. "Sucka Free"

=== AZ - A.W.O.L. ===
- 10. "The Come Up"

=== Big Shug - Who's Hard? ===
- 02. "The Way It Iz"
- 03. "Counter Punch" (featuring Guru)
- 04. "On the Record"
- 05. "Bang 'Em Down"
- 06. "Do Ya"
- 07. "Tha 3 Shugs"
- 08. "Sic a Niguz" (featuring Bumpy Knuckles)
- 19. "Dirt" (featuring H Stax & Smiley the Ghetto Child)
- 20. "What's Really Real?"

=== Blaq Poet - 12" ===
- A1. "We Gonna Ill"
- B1. "Poet's Comin (2 to tha Stomach)"

=== Smooth B - 12" ===
- A1. "Game Over"

=== Little Vic - 12" ===
- A1. "The Exorcist"

=== Special Teamz - 12" ===
- A1. "Main Event"

=== Tony Touch - Play That Song 12" ===
- B2. "Gangsta Gangsta" (featuring Tego Calderón)

=== Sway & King Tech - Back 2 Basics ===
- 08. "Enough Beef" (featuring Royce da 5'9", Common & Chino XL) {Beat reused from "What I'm Here For" - Gang Starr}

=== Heather Hunter - H Double: The Unexpected ===
- 09. "Freak Like Me"

=== Teriyaki Boyz - Beef or Chicken? ===
- 11. "You Know What Time Is It!?"

== 2006 ==
=== AZ - The Format ===
- 10. "The Format"

=== Agallah - You Already Know ===
- 06. "New York Ryder Music"

=== Black Eyed Peas - Renegotiations: The Remixes ===
- 03. "My Style (DJ Premier Remix)" [featuring Justin Timberlake]

=== Blaq Poet - Rewind: Deja Screw ===
- 01. "Bang This"
- 03. "Message from Poet" (original release: 2003)
- 06. "Watch Your Back"
- 10. "Poet Has Come" (original release: 2003)

=== Christina Aguilera - Back to Basics ===
- 1-01. "Intro (Back to Basics)" (featuring Linda Perry)
- 1-03. "Back in the Day"
- 1-04. "Ain't No Other Man"
- 1-11. "Still Dirrty"
- 1-13. "Thank You (Dedication to the Fans)"

=== F.A.B.I.D. - 12" ===
- A2. "Proper Dosage" (featuring Boy Big)

=== Lakey the Kid + Cormega - My Brother's Keeper ===
- 18. "Dirty Game"

=== MC Lyte - Back to Lyte ===
- 000. "Wonder Years"

=== Pitch Black - Revenge ===
- 01. "Nice" (featuring Styles P)
- 02. "Revenge"
- 03. "Rep da Hardest"

=== Ras Kass - Eat or Die ===
- 11. "Realness Freestyle"

=== Smiley the Ghetto Child - The Antidote ===
- 14. "The Wake Up Call"

=== Verbal Threat - 12" ===
- A1. "Reality Check"

=== Teflon - 12" ===
- A1. "Showtime"

=== Various Artists - The Source Presents Fat Tape ===
- 17. "Never Be" -- J-Hood

== 2007 ==
=== Big Shug - Streetchamp ===
- 04. "Play It"
- 08. "Streets Move" (featuring Singapore Kane)
- 10. "It Just Don't Stop"

=== Kanye West, Nas, KRS-One & Rakim - [Digital drop] ===
- B1. "Classic (Better Than I've Ever Been) [DJ Premier Remix]"

=== Kool G Rap - Half a Klip ===
- 09. "On the Rise Again" (feat. Haylie Duff)

=== Mark Ronson - [Digital drop] ===
- A2. "Just (DJ Premier's Justremixitmix)" [featuring Blaq Poet and Phantom Planet]

=== Royce da 5'9" - The Bar Exam {mixtape} ===
- A1. "Hit 'Em"
- B1. "Ding!"

=== NYGz - Welcome 2 G-Dom ===
- 01. "Itz On" (featuring Rave)
- 02. "Ya Dayz R #'d"
- 06. "Get 2 tha Point"
- 07. "G'z & Hustlaz" (featuring Rave)
- 08. "Welcome 2 G-Dom"
- 10. "Giantz ta Thiz" (original release: 2002)
- 16. "Strength" (original release: 2002)

=== NYG'z - [Digital drop] ===
- A1. "Ya Dayz R #'d (NYGemix)" [featuring Bumpy Knuckles, Lady of Rage & Royce da 5'9"]
- B1. "N.H.B." [featuring Blaq Poet]

=== Special Teamz - Stereotypez ===
- 06. "Main Event" (original release: 2005)

== 2008 ==
=== Ali Vegas - Leader of the New School ===
- 02. "Everyday Iz War"

=== Big Shug - Other Side of the Game ===
- 02. "Soundcheck"
- 03. "When I Strike"
- 05. "Like a Muhfucka"
- 09. "My Boston" (featuring Termanology & Singapore Kane)

=== Byata - Undefined ===
- 14. "Byata Is the Illest"

=== Fat Joe - The Elephant in the Room ===
- 12. "That White"

=== SunKiss - N/A ===
- 00. "We Go Back"

=== House of Repz - [Digital drop] ===
- 01. "U Gotta Love Us"

=== Ill Bill - The Hour of Reprisal ===
- 09. "Society Is Brainwashed"

=== Smirnoff Signature Mix Series - Criminal Minded '08 / The Light '08 / Midnight '08 ===
- A1. "Criminal Minded '08" [KRS-One]

=== Lord Finesse - Rare Selections EP Vol. 3 ===
- A1. "Keep the Crowd Listening (DJ Premier Remix)"

=== Laura Izibor - Shine ===
- 02. "From My Heart to Yours (DJ Premier Version)"

=== Ludacris - Theater of the Mind ===
- 12. "MVP"

=== Maroon 5 - Call and Response: The Remix Album ===
- 15. "Secret (Premier 5 Remix)"

=== Reks - Grey Hairs ===
- 03. "Say Goodnight"

=== DJ Premier - Beats That Collected Dust Vol. 1 ===
- 01. "Spin Live"
- 02. "Sing Like Bilal"
- 03. "Blow Horn Joint"
- 04. "Pee-An-Oh"
- 05. "Mysterious"
- 06. "Dadaa"
- 07. "Dink"
- 08. "B-Line"
- 09. "Trackhorn"
- 10. "Waaaaaa"
- 11. "Droop"
- 12. "Original Represent"

=== Termanology - Politics As Usual ===
- 02. "Watch How It Go Down"
- 07. "How We Rock" (featuring Bun B)
- 10. "So Amazing"

=== Torae - Daily Conversation {mixtape} ===
- 05. "Click" (featuring Skyzoo)
- 13. "Get It Done" (featuring Skyzoo)

== 2009 ==
=== Blaq Poet - Tha Blaqprint ===
- 01. "I-Gititin"
- 03. "Ain't Nuttin' Changed"
- 04. "What's the Deal?"
- 05. "Legendary Pt. 1" (featuring Nick Javas 7 NYGz)
- 06. "Hood Crazy"
- 07. "Voices"
- 08. "Hate" (featuring N.O.R.E.)
- 10. "Stretch Marks & Cigarette Burns" (featuring Panchi & Imani Montana)
- 11. "S.O.S."
- 12. "Let the Guns Blow"
- 13. "Don't Give a Fucc"
- 14. "Rap Addiction" (featuring Lil' Fame & Shabeeno)
- 15. "Never Goodbye"

=== Capone-N-Noreaga - Channel 10 ===
- 06. "Grand Royal"

=== Cormega - Born and Raised ===
- 07. "Make It Clear"
- 11. "Dirty Game" (original release: 2006)

=== M.O.P. - Foundation ===
- 05. "What I Wanna B" (feat. Rell)

=== Reks - More Grey Hairs {mixtape} ===
- 03. "Cloud 9"

=== Royce da 5'9" - Street Hop ===
- 04. "Something 2 Ride 2" (featuring Phonte)
- 10. "Shake This"
- 19. "Hood Love" (featuring Bun B & Joell Ortiz)

=== Deams - The Legacy EP ===
- 01. "DJ Premier Legacy Intro"

=== Seven - [Digital drop] ===
- B1. "Go Slow" (featuring Talib Kweli) (DJ Premier Remix)

=== Rytmus - Král ===
- 15. "Jediný" (feat. DJ Premier)

== 2010 ==
=== Canibus - C of Tranquility ===
- 06. "Golden Terra of Rap"

=== Joell Ortiz - [Digital drop] ===
- A1. "Project Boy"

=== Bun B - Trill O.G. ===
- 13. "Let 'Em Know"

=== Fat Joe - The Darkside {mixtape} ===
- 11. "I'm Gone"

=== Smiley the Ghetto Child - [Digital drop] ===
- A1. "I'm Legend"

=== DJ Premier - Presents Get Used to Us ===
- 01. "Bang Dis!" (featuring Blaq Poet) (original release: 2006)
- 02. "Policy" (featuring NYGz)
- 03. "Opportunity Knoccs" (featuring Nick Javas)
- 04. "Hot Flames" (featuring Khaleel)
- 05. "Epic Dynasty" (featuring Dynasty)
- 07. "Temptation" (featuring Young Maylay)
- 08. "5%" (featuring KRS-One & Grand Puba)
- 09. "Ya Dayz R #'d (NYGemix)" [featuring NYGz, The Lady of Rage, Bumpy Knuckles & Royce da 5'9"] (original release: 2007)
- 10. "Sing Like Bilal" (featuring Joell Ortiz) {Beat reused from "Cloud 9" by Reks}
- 11. "Married 2 tha Game" (featuring Teflon & Styles P)
- 12. "Not a Game" (featuring Nick Javas)
- 13. "Ain't Nuttin' Changed (Remix)" [featuring Blaq Poet, MC Eiht & Young Maylay]
- 14. "Lifetime Membership" (featuring Teflon, Saigon & Papoose)
- 16. "The Gang Starr Bus" (featuring Bumpy Knuckles)

=== Soulkast - Honoris Causa ===
- 01. "Première Salve"

=== Wais P - [Digital drop] ===
- A1. You See It

== 2011 ==
=== Various Artists - The Sitter O.S.T. ===
- 09. "Need Some Bad" -- Slick Rick

=== Apathy - Honkey Kong ===
- 05. "Stop What Ya Doin'" (featuring Celph Titled)

=== Bushido - Jenseits von Gut und Böse ===
- 10. "Gangster"

=== DJ Premier - Beats That Collected Dust Vol. 2 ===
- 01. "John T."
- 02. "Ch-Ching"
- 03. "Dots"
- 04. "Doomp Doomp Doomp"
- 05. "Stylesss"
- 06. "Epic-ishh"
- 07. "Beautiful"
- 08. "Change"
- 09. "Live Pro"
- 10. "I Don't Know"
- 11. "Late Night"
- 12. "N.Y.S.O.M. #20"

=== DJ Premier & The Berklee Symphony - Regeneration CDQ ===
- A1. "Re:generation" (featuring Nas)

=== Evidence - Cats & Dogs ===
- 06. "You"
- 17. "The Epilogue"

=== Game - The R.E.D. Album ===
- 18. "Born in the Trap"

=== Joell Ortiz - Free Agent ===
- 05. "Sing Like Bilal" (original release: 2010)

=== Mac Miller - 92 Til Infinity {mixtape} ===
- 01. "Face the Facts"

=== Kendra Morris - [Digital drop] ===
- A1. "Concrete Waves" (DJ Premier 320 Remix)

=== Prop Dylan - The Cardinal Sin {mixtape} ===
- 04. "Shock & Amaze"

=== Nick Javas - [Digital drop] ===
- A1. "Anonymous" (featuring Khaleel)

=== Reks - Rhythmatic Eternal King Supreme ===
- 01. "25th Hour"

=== Torae - For the Record ===
- 12. "For the Record"

=== Royce da 5'9" - Success Is Certain ===
- 01. "Second Place"
- 13. "Writer's Block" (DJ Premier Remix) [featuring Eminem]

=== Edo G - A Face in the Crowd ===
- 01. "Fastlane"

=== SebastiAn - [Digital drop] ===
- B. "Embody" (DJ Premier 95 Break Remix)

=== Verve Records and Rockstar Games Present LA Noire: Remixed! ===
- 04. "Ain't Nobody Here but Us Chickens" (DJ Premier Remix) - Louis Jordan

=== Teflon - [Digital drop] ===
- A1. "4 tha Love"

=== Roscoe P. Coldchain - [Digital drop] ===
- A2. "Imma Kill This Nigga" (featuring Ab-Liva)

=== Venom - [Digital drop] ===
- A2. "Vigilantes" (DJ Premier VHS Remix) [featuring Blaq Poet]

=== Wais P - Premo Pimpin' EP ===
(all production stems from Beats That Collected Dust Vol. 2]

- 01. "Competition (Skit)"
- 02. "Multiple Sclerosis"
- 03. "Premo Fresh (Skit)"
- 04. "Money In The Yard"
- 05. "Some of The Best (Skit)"
- 06. "Lessons"
- 07. "Premo Still Prevail"
- 08. "Come Back To Collect"
- 09. "When The Cops Come (Snitch Bitch)"
- 10. "Trill OG Bun B (Skit)"
- 11. "Ampitheatre"

== 2012 ==
=== DJ Premier & Bumpy Knuckles - StOoDiOtYmE EP ===
- 01. "StOoDiOtYmE"
- 02. "Fake"
- 03. "That Preemo Shit"
- 04. "tAkEiT2tHeToP"
- 05. "Inspired By Fire"

=== KoleXXXion ===
- 01. "My Thoughts"
- 02. "Shake the Room" (featuring Flavor Flav)
- 03. "B.A.P. (Bumpy And Premier)"
- 04. "eVrEEbOdEE"
- 05. "wEaRe aT WaR"
- 06. "P.A.I.N.E. (Pressure At Industry Expense)" (original release: 2003)
- 07. "The Life"
- 08. "F.Y.P.A.U. (Fuck Your Punk Ass Up)"
- 09. "D'Lah" (original release: 2001)
- 10. "More Levels"
- 11. "GrEaTnEsS"
- 12. "EyEnEvErPuTmY4cUsAwAy"
- 13. "Turn Up the Mic (DJ Premier Remix)" [featuring Nas]
- 14. "The Key"
- 15. "OwNiT"
- 16. "The Gang Starr Bus" (original release: 2010)

=== N.O.R.E. - Crack on Steroids {mixtape} ===
- 11. "Thiz Iz Hip Hop" (featuring Bumpy Knuckles)

=== Game - Sunday Service {mixtape} ===
- 05. "HVN4AGNGSTA" (featuring Master P)

=== La Coka Nostra - Masters of the Dark Arts ===
- 04. "Mind Your Business"

=== 38 Spesh - Time Served {mixtape} ===
- 20. "No More"

=== Bishop Nehru - Nehruvia {mixtape} ===
- 07. "Timeless (Freestyle)" {Beat reused from "Timeless" by Showbiz & A.G.

=== Capital STEEZ - AmeriKKKan Korruption {mixtape} ===
- 11. "Talking Shit" (featuring Joey Bada$$) {Beat reused from "So Ghetto" by Jay-Z}

=== ChrisCo - [Digital drop] ===
- "Straight Up" (featuring Jon Connor & Elzhi)

=== Big Shug - I.M. 4-Eva ===
- 02. "Hardbody" (featuring Fat Joe & M.O.P)
- 03. "Spit Six"
- 05. "Blue Collar"
- 11. "We Miss You"

=== Scott Knoxx - Take Off {mixtape} ===
- 04. "Make the Sound" (featuring Rhymefest & Money-B)

=== Showbiz and A.G. - Mugshot Music {mixtape} ===
- 12. Timeless {co-produced by Showbiz}

=== Lil' Fame & Termanology - Fizzyology ===
- 06. "Play Dirty" (featuring Busta Rhymes & Styles P)

=== Vinnie Paz - God of the Serengeti ===
- 03. "The Oracle"

== 2013 ==
=== Joey Bada$$ - Summer Knights {mixtape} ===
- 17. "Unorthodox"

=== Big Daddy Kane - [Digital drop] ===
- "28 Bars of Kane"

=== Khaleel - [Digital drop] ===
- "Nobody Tryna Hear Ya"

=== Czarface - Czarface ===
- 09. "Let It Off"

=== Ill Bill - The Grimy Awards ===
- 17. "World Premier"

=== Demigodz - Killmatic ===
- 06. "Worst Nightmare"

=== Papoose - The Nacirema Dream ===
- 15. "Turn It Up"

=== Tony Touch - The Piece Maker 3: Return of the 50 MC's ===
- 01. "Touch and D-Stroy" -- D-Stroy

=== Rapsody - She Got Game {mixtape} ===
- 14. "Kingship"

=== Fat Joe - The Darkside Vol. 3 {mixtape} ===
- 05. "Your Honor" (featuring Action Bronson)

=== Mack Wilds - New York: A Love Story ===
- 06. "Keepin It Real" {co-produced by Salaam Remi}

=== Dynasty - A Star in Life's Clothing {mixtape} ===
- 05. "Street Music"

=== Sokół & Marysia Starosta - Czarna Biała Magia ===
- 13. "Zepsute Miasto"

=== Kontrafakt - Navždy ===
- 01. "O5 S5"

=== Disclosure - Settle (Special Edition) ===
- 03. "Latch" (DJ Premier Remix)

== 2014 ==
=== DJ Premier ===
- "Guitar Stomp" (Instrumental)
- "Love At The Store" (Instrumental)
- "Zoo York Welcomes Gavin Nolan" (Instrumental)
- "Bars in the Booth (Session 2)" with Dres
- "Bars in the Booth (Session 3)" with Jakk Frost
- "Bars in the Booth (Session 4)" with A.G.
- "Bars in the Booth (Session 5)" with Loaded Lux
- "Bars in the Booth (Session 6)" with Bumpy Knuckles
- "Najsilniejsi przetrwają" ( with Pyskaty, Numer Raz, Proceente, Pelson, Rahim, Łysol, Mielzky, Dwa Sławy, Zeus, Chada, Klasik, Quebonafide, JodSen, Joteste, Bezczel, Siwers & Ten Typ Mes) {co-produced by Luxon}

=== Papoose - [Digital drop] ===
- "Current Events"

=== DJ Premier X Serato 2x12" ===
- A1. NYGz - "My Influences"
- A2. The Lady of Rage - "Chemical Burn"
- A3. "Spaced Dem Mo" (Instrumental)
- A4. "Scarz Face" (Instrumental)

=== D.I.T.C. - The Remix Project ===
- 01. "Diggin' in the Crates (DJ Premier Remix)" [Diamond D, Showbiz, A.G. & Lord Finesse]

=== Skyzoo & Torae - Barrel Brothers ===
- 14. "The Aura" {co-produced by AntMan Wonder}

=== 38 Spesh - The Art of Production {mixtape} ===
- 08. "The Meeting (Problems or Peace)" [featuring Kool G Rap]

=== Soulkast - Memento Mori ===
- 02. "French Touch"

=== Dilated Peoples - Directors of Photography ===
- 06. "Good As Gone"

=== First Division - Overworked & Underpaid {mixtape} ===
- 11. "This Iz tha Time"

=== Ea$y Money - The Motive of Nearly Everybody, Yo {mixtape} ===
- 03. "Nothin Alike"

=== Dynamic Duo - [Digital drop] ===
- 01. "AEAO"
- 02. "Animal"

=== Saigon - G.S.N.T. 3: The Troubled Times of Brian Carenard ===
- 08. "Let's Get Smart"
- 09. "One Foot in the Door" (featuring Big Daddy Kane)
- 10. "Nunya"

=== Diabolic - Fightin' Words ===
- 01. "Diabolical Sound"

=== Ryan Bowers - Owtsider ===
- 02. "The Premier"

=== Various Artists - Shady XV ===
- 05. "Y'all Ready Know" -- Slaughterhouse

=== PRhyme - PRhyme ===
- 01. "PRhyme"
- 02. "Dat Sound Good" (featuring Ab-Soul & Mac Miller)
- 03. "U Looz"
- 04. "You Should Know" (featuring Dwele)
- 05. "Courtesy"
- 06. "Wishin'" (featuring Common)
- 07. "To Me, To You" (featuring Jay Electronica)
- 08. "Underground Kings" (featuring Schoolboy Q & Killer Mike)
- 09. "Microphone Preem" (featuring Slaughterhouse)

=== Paolo Nutini - [Digital drop] ===
- "Let Me Down Easy (DJ Premier Remix)"

== 2015 ==
=== DJ Premier ===
- "Bars in the Booth (Session 7)" with Skyzoo & Torae
- "Bars in the Booth (Session 8)" with Ras Kass

=== Joey Bada$$ - B4.DA.$$ ===
- 03. "Paper Trail$"

=== The Four Owls - Natural Order ===
- 04. "Think Twice"

=== DJ EFN - Another Time ===
- 09. "Who's Crazy?" (Troy Ave, Scarface, Stalley & DJ Premier)

=== Big Shug - Triple OGzus ===
- 01. "I Am Somebody"
- 02. "I Bleed for This"
- 09. "Off Rip" (featuring Termanology & Singapore Kane)

=== Lion Babe - [Digital drop] ===
- "Wonder Woman (DJ Premier Remix)"

=== DJ Premier & BMB Spacekid - [Digital drop] ===
- "Til It's Done" (featuring Anderson .Paak)

=== DJ Snake - Encore (Target Edition) ===
- 16. "You Know You Like It (DJ Premier Remix)"

=== King Magnetic - Timing Is Everything {mixtape} ===
- 09. "Status"

=== Various Artists - Southpaw (soundtrack) ===
- 11. "Mode" -- PRhyme with Logic

=== PRhyme - PRhyme (Deluxe) ===
- 10. "Golden Era" (featuring Joey Bada$$)
- 11. "Wishin II" (featuring Black Thought)
- 12. "Highs and Lows" (featuring MF Doom & Phonte)
- 13. "Mode II" (featuring Logic)

=== Papoose - You Can't Stop Destiny ===
- 04. "The Plug"

=== Dr. Dre - Compton ===
- 14. "Animals" (featuring Anderson .Paak) {additional production by BMB Spacekid}

=== The Game - The Documentary 2 ===
- 15. "The Documentary 2"

=== Torae - Entitled ===
- 15. "Saturday Night"

=== Sidney Max - [Digital drop] ===
- "Here Come the Birds" (featuring Dres) {Beat reused from "Droop" by DJ Premier}

=== G. Fisher - God MC ===
- "Fish Over Premier"

=== Jakk Frost - [Digital drop] ===
- "Dope Boy Talk"

=== Various Artists - NBA 2K16 (soundtrack) ===
- "Hold the City Down" -- Papoose
- "Bum Bum Bum" (Instrumental)

=== Jimi Charles Moody - [Digital drop] ===
- "Other Man (DJ Premier Remix)"

=== Termanology - Term Brady - EP ===
- 09. "Get off the Ground (DJ Premier Mix)" [featuring Sean Price, Fame, Ruste Juxx, Justin Tyme, Hannibal Stax, Papoose & Reks

== 2016 ==
=== DJ Premier & The Badder - [Digital drop] ===
- "Rockin' with the Best" (featuring Royce da 5'9")

=== DJ Premier & Bumpy Knuckles - [Digital drop] ===
- "Rock the Room" (featuring Flavor Flav)

=== Bumpy Knuckles & Sy Ari - [Digital drop] ===
- "EmOsHuNaL GrEeD"

=== Royce da 5'9" - Tabernacle: Trust the Shooter {mixtape} ===
- 01. "Black History"

=== Classified - Greatful {mixtape} ===
- 01. "Filthy"

=== Kanye West - [Digital drop] ===
- "I Love Kanye (T.L.O.Preemix)"

=== Desiigner - [Digital drop] ===
- "Tiimmy Turner (Preemix)"

=== D.I.T.C. - Sessions ===
- 10. "Connect 3" (featuring Diamond D, A.G. & O.C.)

=== Yuna - Chapters ===
- 11. "Places to Go"

=== Twenty One Pilots - [Digital drop] ===
- "Lane Boy (DJ Premier Remix)"

=== The Lox - Filthy America... It's Beautiful ===
- 05. "Move Forward"

== 2017 ==
=== DJ Premier - 2 Lovin U / My Space Baby 13" ===
- "2 Lovin U" -- Miguel
- "My Space Baby" -- Cherub

=== MC Eiht - Which Way Iz West ===
- 06. "Runn the Blocc" (featuring Young Maylay)
- 13. "Last Ones Left" (featuring Compton's Most Wanted)
- 14. "4 tha OG'z" (featuring Bumpy Knuckles)

=== Slaine & Termanology - Anti-Hero ===
- 02. "Anti-Hero" (featuring Bun B & Everlast)

=== Faith Evans & The Notorious B.I.G. - The King & I ===
- 24. "NYC" (featuring Jadakiss)

=== Torii Wolf - Flow Riiot ===
- 01. "Everlasting Peace"
- 02. "Meant to Do"
- 03. "1st"
- 04. "Big Big Trouble"
- 06. "I'd Wait Forever and a Day for You"
- 08. "Go from Here"
- 09. "Shadows Crawl"
- 10. "Nobody Around"
- 12. "Where We Belong"

=== Miley Cyrus - Younger Now (The Remixes) ===
- 05. "Younger Now (DJ Premier Remix)"

=== DJ Premier & ASAP Ferg - [Digital drop] ===
- "Our Streets"

== 2018 ==
=== Evidence - Weather or Not ===
- 12. "10,000 Hours"

=== Apathy - The Widow's Son ===
- 05. "The Order"

=== PRhyme - PRhyme 2 ===
- 01. "Interlude 1 (Salute)"
- 02. "Black History" (original release: 2016)
- 03. "1 of the Hardest"
- 04. "Era" (featuring Dave East)
- 05. "Respect My Gun" (featuring Roc Marciano)
- 06. "W.O.W. (With Out Warning)" [featuring Yelawolf]
- 07. "Sunflower Seeds" (featuring Novel & Summer of '96)
- 08. "Streets at Night"
- 09. "Rock It"
- 10. "Loved Ones" (featuring Rapsody)
- 11. "My Calling"
- 12. "Made Men" (featuring Big K.R.I.T. & Denaun Porter)
- 13. "Relationships (Skit)"
- 14. "Flirt" (featuring 2 Chainz)
- 15. "Everyday Struggle" (featuring Chavis Chandler)
- 16. "Do Ya Thang"
- 17. "Gotta Love It" (featuring Brady Watt & CeeLo Green)

=== Torii Wolf & DJ Premier - Love Me (Amazon O.S.T.) ===
- 01. "Silent Crow"

=== Trick-Trick - SmokeGang {mixtape} ===
- 11. "Get 2 It" (featuring B-Real)

=== 38 Spesh & Kool G Rap - Son of G Rap ===
- 07. "The Meeting" (original release: 2014)
- 14. "Young 1s" (featuring Che'Noir & Anthony Hamilton)

=== J. Cole - [Digital drop] ===
- "1985 (DJ Premier 1966 Remix)"

=== Rudimental - [Digital drop] ===
- "These Days (DJ Premier Remix)" [featuring Jess Glynne, Macklemore & Dan Caplen]

=== Drake - Scorpion ===
- 10. "Sandra's Rose" {additional production by Maneesh}

=== DJ Premier & Casanova - [Digital drop] ===
- "Wut U Said"

== 2019 ==
=== Masta Ace & Marco Polo - A Breukelen Story ===
- 20. "E.A.T. (Evolve And Transcend)" [featuring Evidence]

=== DJ Premier & Griselda - [Digital drop] ===
- "Headlines"

=== Blaq Poet - [Digital drop] ===
- "Contract Killer" {Beat reused from "On the Rise Again" by Kool G Rap w/ Haylie Duff}

=== David Bars - The Bar Code {mixtape} ===
- 01. "Just Like That"
- 04. "Beat the Odds"

=== Papoose - Underrated {mixtape} ===
- 02. "Numerical Slaughter"

=== Mike Posner - Keep Going {mixtape} ===
- "Slow It Down"

=== Gang Starr - One of the Best Yet ===
- 01. "The Sure Shot (Intro)"
- 02. "Lights Out" (featuring M.O.P.)
- 03. "Bad Name"
- 04. "Hit Man" (featuring Q-Tip)
- 05. "What's Real" (featuring Group Home & Royce Da 5'9")
- 06. "Keith Casim Elam (Interlude)"
- 07. "From a Distance" (featuring Jeru the Damaja)
- 08. "Family and Loyalty" (featuring J. Cole)
- 09. "Get Together" (featuring Ne-Yo & Nitty Scott)
- 10. "NYGz/GS 183rd (Interlude)"
- 11. "So Many Rappers"
- 12. "Business or Art" (featuring Talib Kweli)
- 13. "Bring It Back Here"
- 14. "One of the Best Yet (Big Shug Interlude)"
- 15. "Take Flight (Militia, Pt. 4)" [featuring Big Shug & Freddie Foxxx]
- 16. "Bless the Mic"

=== Big Shug - The Diamond Report ===
- 02. "EMF"
- 11. "Still Big"

== 2020 ==
=== Hus Kingpin - End of a Decade {mixtape} ===
- 16. "Leila" {Beat reused from "Insp-Her-Ation" by Da Ranjaz with Cee-Lo}

=== Bishop Nehru - Nehruvia: My Disregarded Thoughts ===
- 05. "Too Lost"

=== The Four Owls - Nocturnal Instinct ===
- 07. "100%"

=== Westside Gunn - Pray for Paris ===
- 11. "Shawn vs Flair"

=== Singapore Kane - Don Manifesto ===
- 05. "Dreams and Visions"

=== Jamo Gang - Walking with Lions ===
- 05. "The 1st Time" (feat. Slug)

=== Papoose - Endangered Species {mixtape} ===
- 11. "Workin"

=== Armani Caesar - The Liz ===
- 07. "Simply Done" (feat. Benny the Butcher)

=== Public Enemy - What You Gonna Do When the Grid Goes Down? ===
- 03. "State of the Union (STFU)" (featuring DJ Premier)

=== Conway the Machine - From King to a God ===
- 14. "Nothin' Less"

=== Busta Rhymes - Extinction Level Event 2: The Wrath of God ===
- 10. "True Indeed"

=== Russ - CHOMP ===
- 03. "Inside Job"

=== Gang Starr - One of the Best Yet (Instrumentals) ===
- 13. "Glowing Mics"

== 2021 ==
=== Papoose - March {mixtape} ===
- 02. "NBA Rhyme Scheme"

=== Westside Gunn, DJ Premier & Brady Watts - [Digital drop] ===
- "Narcissist"

=== Russ - CHOMP 2 ===
- 07. "Free" (featuring Big K.R.I.T., Snoop Dogg & DJ Premier)

=== DJ Premier & 2 Chainz - [Digital drop] ===
- "Mortgage Free"

=== Various Artists - Watch the Sound (Apple TV+ Original Series Soundtrack) ===
- 02. "Why Would I Stop" -- DJ Premier & Wale

== 2022 ==
=== Mass Appeal Records - Hip Hop 50 EP Vol.1 ===
- 01. "Lettin' Off Steam" (feat. Joey Bada$$)
- 02. "Remy Rap" (feat. Remy Ma, Rapsody)
- 03. "Beat Breaks" (feat. Nas)
- 04. "Terrible 2´s" (feat. Run The Jewels)
- 05. "Root of It All" (feat. Slick Rick, Lil Wayne)

=== Sonnyjim & The Purist - White Girl Wasted ===
- 03. "Doc Ellis" (featuring DJ Premier)

=== Black Soprano Family - Long Live DJ Shay ===
- 08. "Times Is Rough"

=== Prodigy - The Hegelian Dialectic 2: The Book of Heroine ===
- 02. "Walk Out" (featuring DJ Premier)

=== El Gant - O.S.L.O. {mixtape} ===
- 03. "Leave It Alone"

=== Feid - SIXDO ===
- 6. "Le Pido a Dios"

=== Liam Gallagher - [Digital drop] ===
- 02. "Diamond in the Dark (DJ Premier Remix)

=== Ab-Soul - Herbert ===
- 18. "Gotta Rap"

== 2023 ==
=== Teflon - 2 Sides to Every Story ===
- 02. "Out the Gate"
- 03. "Contraband"
- 04. "4 tha Love" (original release: 2011)
- 11. "Hostile Takeover" (featuring Benny the Butcher)
- 13. "The Thoro Side" (featuring M.O.P.)

=== DJ Premier, Westside Gunn & Rome Streets - [Digital drop] ===
- A1. "Runway"

=== BLP Kosher - Bars Mitzvah ===
- 12. "Endless" {co-produced with Brady Watt}

=== DJ Premier - Beats That Collected Dust Vol. 3 ===
- 01. "WooWooWoo"
- 02. "Really"
- 03. "Kelly B"
- 04. "Eiht 45"
- 05. "Climb Max"
- 06. "Here We Go"
- 07. "Haye"
- 08. "Bah Dah"
- 09. "Bogart"
- 10. "The Can"
- 11. "Dee Ell P"
- 12. "Bark ‘N Growl"
- 13. "Spaced Dem No"
- 14. "Shy Role"
- 15. "Perc Pad"
- 16. "Bobble"
- 17. "In Moe"
- 18. "Episode 207"

=== DJ Premier & Common -[Digital drop] ===
- A1. "In Moe (Speculation)"

== 2024 ==
=== DJ Premier - [Digital drop] ===
- "Work This Out" (featuring Russ)
- "Can U Dig That?" (featuring Snoop Dogg)
- "Ya Don't Stop" (featuring Rick Ross, Lil Wayne & Big Sean)

=== Nas & DJ Premier - [Digital drop] ===
- "Define My Name"

=== Chance the Rapper - [Digital drop] ===
- 01. "Together"

=== Tha Dogg Pound - W.A.W.G. (We All We Got) ===
- 14. "Who da Hardest" (featuring The Lady of Rage, RBX & Snoop Dogg)

=== DJ Premier, Braddy Watt & O.A.R. - [Digital drop] ===
- "Gonna Be Me"

=== Lex Records - Lex-XX ===
- 4. "Social Distortion" (DJ Premier Remix) [featuring MF Doom] -- Prince Po

=== Gang Starr - [Digital drop] ===
- "Finishem"

=== Alemán y Gera MX - Rich Mafia Vol.1 ===
- 12. "Plaza Con Prada"

== 2025 ==
=== DJ Premier - [Digital drop] ===
- "Bars in the Booth (Session 9)" with Loaded Lux
- "Bars in the Booth (Session 10)" with Freeway

=== Redman - [Digital drop] ===
- "Lalala" (featuring Method Man) (DJ Premier Remix)

=== BLP Kosher - The Brackish ===
- 14. "Benny and the Jetz" (featuring Benny The Butcher)

=== Joe Budden - Joe Budden New Podcast ===
- Intro

=== Roc Marciano & DJ Premier - The Coldest Profession ===
- 01. "Arrival"
- 02. "Armani Section"
- 03. "Prayer Hands"
- 04. "Good To Go"
- 05. "Glory Hole"
- 06. "RocMarkable"
- 07. "Travel Fox"
- 08. "Execution Style"

=== Ransom & DJ Premier - The Reinvention ===
- 01. "Amazing Graces"
- 02. "A Cut Above"
- 03. "Rap Radar x Ransom"
- 04. "Chaos Is My Ladder"
- 05. "Forgiveness"
- 06. "Survivor's Remorse"
- 07. "Reinvention"

=== De La Soul - Cabin in the Sky ===
- 03. "Sunny Storms"
- 14. "The Silent Life of a Truth"
- 15. "EN EFF" (featuring Black Thought)

=== Nas & DJ Premier - Light-Years ===
- 01. "My Life is Real"
- 02. "Git Ready"
- 03. "N.Y. State of Mind Pt. 3"
- 04. Welcome to the Underground"
- 05. "Madman"
- 06. "Pause Tapes"
- 07. "Writers"
- 08. "Sons (Young Kings)"
- 09. "It's Time"
- 10. "Nasty Esco Nasir"
- 11. "My Story Your Story (featuring AZ)
- 12. "Bouquet (To the Ladies)"
- 13. "Junkie"
- 14. "Shine Together"
- 15. "3rd Childhood"

== 2026 ==
=== Jill Scott - To Whom This May Concern ===
- 05. "Norf Side" (featuring Tierra Whack)

=== Henri - Welcome To The Show ===
- 02. "Infinite"

=== DJ Premier & Alchemist - [Digital drop] ===
- "No Explanation" (featuring Evidence)

=== DJ Premier & Samara Cyn - Amazon Music Original (Major League Soccer 2027 Campaign) ===
- "Can I Kick It"

=== DJ Premier & Feid & Lil Supa - [Digital drop] ===
- “Bello Love”
