= Screwed Up =

Compilation album by Screwball
- Released: July 19, 2004
- Recorded: 1996–2004
- Genre: Hip hop
- Label: Hydra Entertainment
- Producer: Jerry Famolari (exec.); A Kid Called Roots; Ayatollah; Cisco; DJ Premier; Eddie Sancho; F Bee; Godfather Don; Lee Stone; Marley Marl; Mike Heron; Pete Rock; Roger Pauletta; The Beatnuts; V.I.C.

Screwball chronology
Loyalty (2001)	Screwed Up (2004)

Singles from Screwed Up
- 1. "What The Deal / Greatest On Earth" Released: 2002; 2. "I Ain't Saying Nothing" Released: 2004

Screwed Up is a compilation album by American hip hop quartet Screwball. The double disc project was released on July 19, 2004, via Hydra Entertainment. It is primarily composed of songs from the group's two previous albums Y2K: The Album and Loyalty, as well as new tracks, remixes, and songs from member Hostyle's One Eyed Maniac album. The album's title came from the group's 1996 single "Screwed Up" b/w "They Wanna Know Why". After the release of Screwed Up, member Blaq Poet pursued a solo career. Member Kenneth "KL" Lewis died on March 28, 2008, of an asthma attack, and member Fredrick "Hostyle" Ivey died in January 2020. The compilation was re-issued for digital download shortened to fifteen tracks.

Production was handled by Godfather Don, Mike Heron, Ayatollah, V.I.C., DJ Premier, A Kid Called Roots, Cisco, Eddie Sancho, F Bee, Lee Stone, Marley Marl, Pete Rock, Roger Pauletta and The Beatnuts, with Jerry Famolari serving as executive producer. It features guest appearances from Cormega, Godfather Don, Nature, Capone-N-Noreaga, Fred Fowler, Kool G Rap, Matrix Bars, MC Shan, Mobb Deep, M.O.P., Nashawn, Offdamental and DJ Stretch Armstrong.

== Track listing ==
Screwed Up (2×CD compilation limited edition)
No.	Title	Writer(s)	Producer(s)	Length
1.	"Stretch Armstrong/Poet (Intro)" (featuring DJ Stretch Armstrong)	Wilbur Bass; Adrian Bartos
2.	"Urban Warfare (RMX)"	Kenneth Lewis; Kyron Jones; Fredrick Ivey; Bass; Mike Herard	Mike Heron
3.	"Dirt Thugs" (featuring Godfather Don)	Lewis; K. Jones; Ivey; Bass; Rodney Chapman	Godfather Don
4.	"Torture" (featuring M.O.P.)	Bass; Ivey; K. Jones; Lewis; Jamal Grinnage; Eric Murry; Lee Stone	Stone
5.	"Who?"	Lewis; K. Jones; Ivey; Bass; Lamont Dorrell	Ayatollah
6.	"That Shit"	K. Jones; Lewis; Bass; Ivey; Herard	Mike Heron
7.	"Take It There" (featuring Capone)	Bass; K. Jones; Ivey; Kiam Holley; Victor Padilla	V.I.C.
8.	"Guilty"	K. Jones; Ivey; Chapman	Godfather Don
9.	"Seen It All"	K. Jones; Lewis; Bass; Ivey; Chris Martin	DJ Premier
10.	"Loyalty" (featuring Cormega)	Bass; Lewis; Cory McKay; Chapman	Godfather Don
11.	"The Blocks" (featuring Nature)	Ivey; K. Jones; Jermain Baxter; Patrick Lawrence	A Kid Called Roots
12.	"Hostyle"	Ivey; Herard	Mike Heron
13.	"Real Niggaz"	K. Jones; Dorrell	Ayatollah
14.	"Greatest on Earth"	Lewis; K. Jones; Ivey; Bass; Roger Pauletta	Roger Pauletta
15.	"Attn A&R Dept"	Bass; K. Jones; Ivey; Lewis; Eddie Sancho	Eddie Sancho
16.	"You Love to Hear the Stories (Pete Rock RMX)" (featuring MC Shan)	Bass; Shawn Moltke; Peter Phillips; Marlon Williams; Chapman	Pete Rock
17.	"Be on Your Way" (featuring Fred Fowler)	K. Jones; Ivey; Fred Fowler; Herard	Mike Heron
18.	"Like a Gangster" (featuring Matrix Bars)	Bass; Lewis; J. Perry; Dorrell	Ayatollah
19.	"The Operation" (featuring Nashawn)	Bass; K. Jones; Ivey; Nashawn Jones; Herard	Mike Heron
20.	"Gorillas" (featuring N.O.R.E. and Kool G Rap)	Bass; Lewis; Nathaniel Wilson; Victor Santiago; Chapman	Godfather Don
21.	"F.A.Y.B.A.N"	Bass; Martin	DJ Premier
22.	"What the Deal?" (featuring Cormega)	Lewis; Bass; McKay; Padilla	V.I.C.
23.	"Where U At?" (featuring Nature)	Lewis; K. Jones; Ivey; Baxter; Chapman	Godfather Don
24.	"On Point (RMX)"	Lewis; K. Jones; Ivey; Chapman	Godfather Don
25.	"Heat Is On (RMX)" (featuring Prodigy and Godfather Don)	Bass; Albert Johnson; Chapman; Herard	Mike Heron
26.	"I Ain't Saying Nothing"	K. Jones; Ivey; F. Abreu	Cisco
27.	"Somethings Gotta Give"	Ivey; R. Chapman	Godfather Don
28.	"Crime Unit"	Lewis; K. Jones; Ivey; Bass; Chapman	Godfather Don
29.	"Ride for Free"	Lewis; K. Jones; J. Crespo	FBEE
30.	"Who Shot Rudy?"	K. Jones; Herard	Mike Heron
31.	"Taking All Bets" (featuring OffDaMental)	Lewis; W. Rosa; Dorrell	Ayatollah
32.	"Screwed Up"	Lewis; K. Jones; Ivey; Bass; Lester Fernandez	The Beatnuts
33.	"On the Real" (featuring Cormega and Havoc)	Lewis; K. Jones; McKay; Kejuan Muchita; Williams	Marley Marl
34.	"Shouts"

Screwed Up (2004 DCM Reissue/Seven13 Music)
No.	Title	Length
1.	"Stretch Armstrong Intro"	1:11
2.	"Street Conflict" (featuring Cormega)	3:02
3.	"Urban Warfare" (Remix)	2:53
4.	"Where You At (Remix)" (featuring Nature)	4:09
5.	"What's the Deal" (featuring Cormega)	2:05
6.	"Who"	4:20
7.	"Guilty"	3:07
8.	"I Ain't Saying Nothing"	3:42
9.	"Be on Your Way"	4:06
10.	"Something Gotta Give"	3:59
11.	"Crime Unit"	3:45
12.	"Ride for Free"	3:51
13.	"Greatest on Earth"	3:50
14.	"Taking All Bets"	2:57
15.	"Shouts"	0:45
Total length:		47:42
