= Loyalty (Screwball album) =

Studio album by Screwball
- Released: June 26, 2001
- Recorded: 2000–01
- Studio: C Mo' Greens Studio (New York, NY)
- Genre: Hip hop
- Length: 1:06:44
- Label: Hydra Entertainment; Landspeed Records
- Producer: Jerry Famolari (exec.); Ayatollah; DJ GI Joe; F Bee; Godfather Don; Goodie Goodman; Lee Stone; Mike Heron; Spkilla; The Beatnuts

Screwball chronology
Y2K: The Album (2000)	Loyalty (2001)	Screwed Up (2004)

Singles from Loyalty
- 1. "Torture" Released: 2001; 2. "Gorillas (Remix)" Released: 2002; 3. "Too High, Too Low / Real Niggaz" Released: 2002

Professional ratings
Review scores
Source	Rating
RapReviews	6/10

Loyalty is the second studio album by American hip hop group Screwball. It was released on June 26, 2001, via Hydra Entertainment/Landspeed Records. Recording sessions took place at C Mo' Greens Studio in New York. Production was mainly handled by Godfather Don and Ayatollah. It features guest appearances from Black Attack, Complexion, Cormega, Kool G Rap, Matrix Bars, M.O.P., Nature, N.O.R.E. and Tragedy Khadafi. The album peaked at number 185 on the US Billboard 200. Its lead single, Lee Stone-produced "Torture", made it to #78 on the Hot R&B/Hip-Hop Songs and #2 on the Hot Rap Songs.

== Track listing ==
No.	Title	Writer(s)	Producer(s)	Length
1.	"The Intro"	Wilbur Bass; Lamont Dorrell	Ayatollah	1:50
2.	"Like a Gangsta" (featuring Matrix Bars)	Bass; Kenneth Lewis; Dorrell	Ayatollah	4:42
3.	"Where You At?" (featuring Nature)	Lewis; Fredrick Ivey; Kyron Jones; Jermain Baxter; Rodney Chapman	Godfather Don	4:10
4.	"Live and Let Die"	Lewis; Ivey; Jones; Dorrell	Ayatollah	3:54
5.	"Torture" (featuring M.O.P.)	Bass; Lewis; Ivey; Jones; Eric Murray; Jamal Grinnage; Lee Stone	Stone	3:06
6.	"Check the Resume"		DJ G.I. Joe	0:33
7.	"When the Sun Goes Down"	Bass; Lewis; Dorrell	Ayatollah	3:20
8.	"Turn It Up"	Bass; Lewis; Ivey; Jones	F Bee	4:21
9.	"I Spit" (featuring Black Attack)	Ivey; Jones; Sean Boston; R. Chapman	Godfather Don	4:08
10.	"Loyalty" (featuring Cormega)	Bass; Lewis; Cory McKay; R. Chapman	Godfather Don	4:26
11.	"Real Niggaz"	Jones; Dorrell	Ayatollah	4:19
12.	"Gorillas" (featuring Kool G Rap and Noreaga)	Bass; Lewis; Nathaniel Wilson; Victor Santiago; R. Chapman	Godfather Don	3:55
13.	"My Niggas"	Bass; R. Chapman	Godfather Don	3:24
14.	"Too High, Too Low" (featuring Tragedy Khadafi)	Bass; Lewis; Ivey; Percy Chapman; Mike Herard	Mike Heron	3:20
15.	"Street Life"	Ivey; R. Chapman	Godfather Don	3:50
16.	"The Booth"			0:59
17.	"The Bio"	Bass	Goodie Goodman	4:01
18.	"Gotta Believe" (featuring Complexion)	Lewis; Edwin Almonte	SPK	4:04
19.	"Screwed Up"	Bass; Lewis; Ivey; Jones; Lester Fernandez	The Beatnuts	4:22
Total length:				1:06:44

== Personnel ==
- Wilbur "The Poet" Bass – performer (tracks: 1, 2, 5, 7, 8, 10, 12–14, 17, 19), associate producer
- Kenneth "KL" Lewis – performer (tracks: 2–5, 7, 8, 10, 12, 14, 18, 19), associate producer
- Fredrick "Hostyle" Ivey – performer (tracks: 3–5, 8, 9, 14, 15, 19)
- Kyron "Solo" Jones – performer (tracks: 3–5, 8, 9, 11, 19)
- Matrix Bars – featured artist (track 2)
- Jermaine "Nature" Baxter – featured artist (track 3)
- Eric "Billy Danze" Murray – featured artist (track 5)
- Jamal "Lil' Fame" Grinnage – featured artist (track 5)
- Sean "Black Attack" Boston – featured artist (track 9)
- Cory "Cormega" McKay – featured artist (track 10)
- Nathaniel "Kool G Rap" Wilson – featured artist (track 12)
- Victor "Noreaga" Santiago – featured artist (track 12)
- Percy "Tragedy Khadafi" Chapman – featured artist (track 14)
- Complextion – featured artist (track 18)
- Lamont "Ayatollah" Dorrell – producer (tracks: 1, 2, 4, 7, 11)
- Rodney "Godfather Don" Chapman – producer (tracks: 3, 9, 10, 12, 13, 15)
- Lee Stone – producer (track 5)
- Joseph P. "G.I. Joe" Rivera – producer (track 6)
- F Bee – producer (track 8)
- Mike "Heron" Herrard – producer (track 14)
- Goodie Goodman – producer (track 17)
- Edwin "S.P.K." Almonte – producer (track 18)
- The Beatnuts – producers (track 19)
- Max Vargas – mixing & recording (tracks: 1, 2, 4, 5, 7–9, 11, 14, 15, 17, 18), engineering (tracks: 3, 10, 12, 13)
- Dino Z. – engineering (track 19)
- Duncan Stanbury – mastering
- Jerry Famolari – executive producer, A&R
- Robert "Bob" Perry – associate producer
- Trevor "Karma" Gendron – art direction, design & layout

== Charts ==
Chart (2001)	Peak position
US Billboard 200	185
US Top R&B/Hip-Hop Albums (Billboard)	44
US Independent Albums (Billboard)	8
US Heatseekers Albums (Billboard)	11
