= Mike Herard =

New York hip hop producer

Mike "Heron" Herard
- Genres: hip hop
- Occupations: Musician; songwriter; record producer
- Years active: 1997–present
- Labels: Shady Records; Rawkus Records; Hydra Entertainment; BeatHustle

Mike "Heron" Herard is New York based songwriter, producer and talent manager, primarily in the hip hop music genre. He is a vice president of Artists and Repertoire (A&R) for Shady Records. Additionally, Herard is a producer and co-owner at Hydra Entertainment, and the founder of BeatHustle, a music platform and management company.

Throughout his career, he has collaborated with a diverse range of artists, including Joell Ortiz, Cool & Dre, Murda Beatz, Metro Boomin, DJ Premier, Royce 5'9, helping launch the career of rap artists and groups such as Conway the Machine, Griselda and Slaughterhouse.

== Early life and career ==
During his childhood, Herard's family relocated from Haiti to New York and settled in Elmhurst, Queens.

In the mid-1990s, Herard gained recognition for his ability to discover obscure samples in music stores, which he would then re-record onto LPs and trade or sell to producers such as No I.D. and Dr. Dre. This experience later inspired him to create a digital platform for musicians, focusing on legal and supportive practices.

=== Music Production ===
In 1997, Herard co-founded Hydra Records alongside Jerry Famolari, marking the beginning of his career in the music industry.

One of Herard's notable accomplishments was his production of the song "H-O-S-T-Y-L-E" for Screwball's debut album Y2K: The Album, released under Hydra Records.

In 2000, at the age of 25, Herard started working for Rawkus Records, a music label, where he assumed responsibility for handling Lamont Coleman, a.k.a Big L's album, The Big Picture. In the aftermath of Big L's untimely death, Herard collaborated with Donald Phinazee, the late artist's brother, to preserve his legacy. Together, they obtained the publishing rights to Big L's debut album, Lifestylez ov da Poor & Dangerous, and worked with another partner to manage the rights and ensure Sony royalty payments were made to the artist's family.

Since 2013, Herard has held the position of vice president of Artists and Repertoire (A&R) at Shady Records, the record label founded by rapper Eminem.

In 2014, Herard collaborated with DJ Premier and Royce 5'9 and other artists to produce the album Prhyme.

In 2019, Summer, a song written by Herard, and performed by The Carters, was nominated for the 61st Grammy Awards for Best R&B Performance.

=== Talent Management ===
While working for Shady records, Herard also started managing as a side hustle. He manages hip hop artists such as Robert "G Koop” Mandell, AntMan Wonder, Joell Ortiz, and co-manages the rap group Slaughterhouse. As a manager, Herard noticed the problem of artists not being credited and paid properly for their work.

In January 2017, Herard established BeatHustle, a management company dedicated to supporting sample composers. The company aims to produce music while coordinating with all parties, seeking the necessary permissions for sample music used, and making sure all artists are duly credited and paid what is due. Noteworthy clients of BeatHustle have contributed samples and production on tracks such as Muni Long's Hrs & Hrs, Migos' Bad and Boujee, and Drake's Knife Talk.

== Reception ==
Herard's professional accomplishments have garnered attention from music industry critics and have been covered in various media outlets. He has been notably featured in publications such as Rolling Stone and Pitchfork. Rolling Stone magazine specifically highlighted Herard's commitment to protecting musicians' copyrights and his stance against injustice.Additionally, Entrepreneur magazine recognized his contributions to the success of several celebrities, including Migos, Rihanna, Jay-Z, and Travis Scott, by helping them create hit songs.

== Discography ==
Solo albums

- Mike Heron, Ghetto Pros - Hydra Beats Volume 10 (LP, 1997)

Credits

- Screwball – "H-O-S-T-Y-L-E" (Tommy Boy 1999)
- Big L – "Flamboyant" (Rawkus, 2000)
- Screwball – "Y2K" (Tommy Boy, 2000)
- Big Pun – "Brave In the Heart" (Loud Records, 2001)
- Kool G Rap – "My Life" from the album The Giancana Story (Koch Records, Rawkus, 2002)

== See also ==
- Recording and production of Eminem's album Music to Be Murdered By
- Tommy Boy Records
- East Coast hip hop
- Gangsta rap
