= DJ Premier Presents Get Used To Us =

Get Used To Us

Compilation album by DJ Premier
- Released: December 7, 2010
- Genre: Hip-hop
- Length: 54:44
- Label: Year Round Records
- Producer: DJ Premier

DJ Premier chronology
Tha Blaqprint (2008)	Get Used To Us (2010)	Beats That Collected Dust Vol. 2 (2011)

DJ Premier Presents - Get Used To Us is a compilation album by American hip-hop DJ and record producer DJ Premier. The album was released on his Year Round Records on December 7, 2010. It features collaborations from frequent DJ Premier's collaborators and a few newcomers. The album was well received by critics.

== Track listing ==
- All songs produced by DJ Premier for Work of Mart, Inc. except where it's noted.
1. "Bang Dis!" (featuring Blaq Poet)
2. "Policy" (featuring NYGz)
3. "Opportunity Knoccs" (featuring Nick Javas)
4. "Hot Flames" (featuring Khaleel)
5. "Epic Dynasty" (featuring Dynasty)
6. "Fine By Me" (featuring MC Eiht, produced by Brenk Sinatra)
7. "Temptation" (featuring Young Maylay)
8. "5%" (featuring KRS-One & Grand Puba)
9. "Ya Dayz R #'d (NYGemix)" (featuring NYGz, Lady Of Rage, Bumpy Knuckles & Royce Da 5'9")
10. "Sing Like Bilal" (featuring Joell Ortiz)
11. "Married 2 Tha Game" (featuring Teflon & Styles P)
12. "Not A Game" (featuring Nick Javas)
13. "Ain't Nuttin' Changed (Remix)" (featuring Blaq Poet, MC Eiht & Young Maylay)
14. "Lifetime Membership" (featuring Teflon, Saigon & Papoose)
15. "Rappin' Exercise" (featuring Khaleel & Panchi of NYGz, produced by Showbiz)
16. "The Gang Starr Bus" (featuring Bumpy Knuckles)
