= Y2K: The Album =

Studio album by Screwball
- Released: February 8, 2000
- Recorded: 1997–99
- Studio: C Mo' Greens Studio (New York, NY); D&D Studios (New York, NY); House Of Hits (New York, NY)
- Genre: Hip hop
- Length: 1:07:11
- Label: Tommy Boy
- Producer: Jerry Famolari (exec.); Mike Heron (also exec.); A Kid Called Roots; Biz Markie; DJ Premier; Eddie Sancho; EZ Elpee; Godfather Don; Marley Marl; Max Vargas; Pete Rock; V.I.C.

Screwball chronology
Y2K: The Album (2000)	Loyalty (2001)

Singles from Y2K
- 1. "You Love To Hear The Stories / Who Shot Rudy?" Released: 1999; 2. "F.A.Y.B.A.N. / Seen It All" Released: June 8, 1999; 3. "H-O-S-T-Y-L-E" Released: September 7, 1999

Professional ratings
Review scores
Source	Rating
AllMusic	4/5 stars
RapReviews	8/10
Spin	8/10

Y2K: The Album is the debut album by American hip hop group Screwball. It was released on February 8, 2000, via Tommy Boy Records. The recording sessions took place at C Mo' Greens Studio, D&D Studios and House Of Hits in New York City. The production was handled by several record producers, including Mike Heron, Godfather Don, DJ Premier, Pete Rock, Marley Marl and Biz Markie. It features guest appearances from Big Noyd, Capone, Cormega, MC Shan, Mobb Deep, Nature, Nashawn, Prince A.D. and Triple Seis. The album peaked at number 50 on the US Billboard Top R&B/Hip-Hop Albums. Its singles "F.A.Y.B.A.N." and "H-O-S-T-Y-L-E" were also charted on the Hot Rap Songs.

== Track listing ==
No.	Title	Writer(s)	Producer(s)	Length
1.	"Album Intro"			0:15
2.	"That Shit"	Kenneth Lewis; Wilbur Bass; Kyron Jones; Fredrick Ivey; Mike Herard; Nona Hendryx	Mike Heron	3:39
3.	"F.A.Y.B.A.N."	Bass; Chris Martin	DJ Premier	3:08
4.	"Take It There" (featuring Capone)	Bass; Ivey; K. Jones; Kiam Holley; Victor Padilla; Quincy Jones; Charles May	V.I.C.	3:21
5.	"Y2K"	Lewis; Bass; Ivey; K. Jones; Rodney Chapman	Godfather Don	2:48
6.	"Seen It All"	Bass; Ivey; Lewis; Martin; Joseph Cartagena; Corey Woods; Rodney Lemay	DJ Premier	4:07
7.	"Somebody's Gotta Do It" (featuring Triple Seis)	Ivey; K. Jones; Sammy Garcia; Herard	Mike Heron	3:51
8.	"You Love to Hear the Stories" (featuring MC Shan)	Bass; Shawn Moltke; Peter Phillips; Marlon Williams	Pete Rock	4:50
9.	"The Heat Is On" (featuring Prodigy and Godfather Don)	Bass; Albert Johnson; Chapman; Herard; Harvey Scales; Melvin Griffin	Mike Heron	3:36
10.	"The Blocks" (featuring Nature)	Ivey; K. Jones; Jermain Baxter; Patrick Lawrence	A Kid Called Roots	3:54
11.	"No Exceptions" (fearuting Rapper Noyd)	Ivey; Lewis; Bass; Max Vargas	Max Vargas	3:37
12.	"The Operation" (featuring Nashawn)	Ivey; K. Jones; Bass; Nashawn Jones; Herard; Harry Warnow; Bernard Hanighen	Mike Heron	3:26
13.	"Urban Warfare"	Ivey; Herard	Mike Heron	2:03
14.	"Who Shot Rudy?"	K. Jones; Ivey; Herard	Mike Heron	3:29
15.	"Biz Interlude"	K. Jones; Marcel Hall	Max Vargas; Biz Markie	1:36
16.	"H-O-S-T-Y-L-E"	Ivey; Herard	Mike Heron	3:25
17.	"Communications" (featuring Prince AD)	Lewis; Ivey; Lamont Porter	EZ Elpee	3:28
18.	"Zoning"	Bass; Ivey; Lewis; K. Jones; Chapman	Godfather Don	4:13
19.	"Attention: A&R Department"	Ivey; Bass; Lewis; Eddie Sancho; Heron	Eddie Sancho	4:08
20.	"On the Real" (featuring Havoc and Cormega)	Lewis; K. Jones; Cory McKay; Kejuan Muchita; Williams	Marley Marl	4:17
Total length:				1:07:11

Sample credits

- Track 2 contains a sample of "Take the Night Off" written by Nona Hendryx and performed by Labelle
- Track 4 contains a sample of "There's a Train Leavin'" written by Quincy Jones and Charles May and performed by Quincy Jones
- Track 6 contains a sample of "Firewater" written by Joseph Cartagena, Corey Woods and Rodney Lemay and performed by Fat Joe
- Track 8 contains a scratch of "The Bridge" written by Marlon Williams and Shawn Moltke and performed by Marley Marl
- Track 9 contains a sample of "Keeps Getting Better" written by Harvey Scales and Melvin Griffin and performed by Harvey Scales
- Track 12 contains a sample of "Mountain High Valley Low" written by Raymond Scott and Bernie Hanighen and performed by Morgana King

== Charts ==
Chart (2000)	Peak position
US Top R&B/Hip-Hop Albums (Billboard)	50
US Independent Albums (Billboard)	11
US Heatseekers Albums (Billboard)	10
