= God of the Serengeti =

Studio album by Vinnie Paz
- Released: October 22, 2012
- Recorded: 2011–2012
- Genre: Hip-hop
- Length: 1:09:55
- Label: Enemy Soil; The Orchard
- Producer: Arcitype; Beatnick Dee; C-Lance; DJ Lethal; DJ Premier; Havoc; Illinformed; Jack of All Trades; JBL the Titan; Marco Polo; Mr. Green; MTK; Psycho Les; Stu Bangas; Tony Kenyatta

Vinnie Paz chronology
Season of the Assassin (2010)	God of the Serengeti (2012)	The Cornerstone of the Corner Store (2016)

God of the Serengeti is the second studio album by American rapper Vinnie Paz. It was released on October 22, 2012, by Enemy Soil Entertainment and The Orchard. Production was handled by C-Lance, JBL the Titan, Arcitype, Beatnick Dee, DJ Lethal, DJ Premier, Havoc, Illinformed, Jack of All Trades, Marco Polo, Mr. Green, MTK, Psycho Les, Stu Bangas and Tony Kenyatta. It features guest appearances from Army of the Pharaohs, Blaq Poet, Block McCloud, Baby Pun, F.T., Immortal Technique, Kool G Rap, La Coka Nostra, Mobb Deep, Poison Pen, Q-Unique, R.A. the Rugged Man, Scarface, Smoke, Tragedy Khadafi and Whispers.

Music videos were released for the songs "Cheesesteaks" and "The Oracle".

== Critical reception ==
Professional ratings
Aggregate scores
Source	Rating
Metacritic	72/100
Review scores
Source	Rating
AllMusic	4/5 stars
Exclaim!	7/10
HipHopDX	4/5
RapReviews	8/10
XXL	3/5

God of the Serengeti was met with generally favourable reviews from music critics. At Metacritic, which assigns a normalized rating out of 100 to reviews from mainstream publications, the album received an average score of 72, based on seven reviews.

AllMusic's David Jeffries praised the work with words: "plenty of hot air pushes it forward, while cold steel keeps it on the ground, just like the kinetic, magnetic Paz". William Ketchum III of HipHopDX found "his sophomore solo set, God of the Serengeti, sticks to the script, and that's not a bad thing". Steve 'Flash' Juon of RapReviews.com resumed: "he's an unusual flavor, but one that should still be considered a delicacy--even if it just might be bad for you". Thomas Quinlan of Exclaim! considered that the album "should impress fans and may even bring back some of those who miss the Psycho-Social days".

In his mixed review for XXL, Nick De Molina stated: "while God of the Serengeti doesn't blaze any new ground, it is a release that will hold up to the Paz's legacy on the underground scene and will surely satisfy long-time fans".

DJ Premier ranked the album at No. 12 of his year-end list of top 20 favourite albums of 2012.

== Commercial performance ==
In the United States, the album sold 4,300 units during its first week, charting at number 102 on the Billboard 200 and number 16 on the Top R&B/Hip-Hop Albums. In the United Kingdom, the album debuted at number 34 on the Official Hip Hop and R&B Albums Chart and number 19 on the Official Independent Album Breakers Chart.

== Track listing ==
No.	Title	Writer(s)	Producer(s)	Length
1.	"Shadow of the Guillotine" (featuring Q-Unique)	Vincenzo Luvineri; Anthony Quiles; Leor Dimant	DJ Lethal	2:45
2.	"Slum Chemist"	Luvineri; Craig Lanciani	C-Lance	3:25
3.	"The Oracle"	Luvineri; Christopher Edward Martin	DJ Premier	3:23
4.	"And Your Blood Will Blot Out the Sun" (featuring Immortal Technique and Poison Pen)	Luvineri; Felipe Coronel; Lékan Herron; Tony Kenyatta	Tony Kenyatta	3:23
5.	"Last Breath" (featuring Baby Pun and Whispers)	Luvineri; Christopher Lee Rios Jr.; Whispers; Lanciani	C-Lance	3:12
6.	"Crime Library" (featuring Blaq Poet)	Luvineri; Wilbur Bass; Marco Bruno	Marco Polo	2:58
7.	"Feign Submission" (Interlude)	Luvineri; J. Ibarra	JBL the Titan	2:16
8.	"Duel to the Death" (featuring Mobb Deep)	Luvineri; Albert Johnson; Kejuan Muchita; Stuart Hudgins	Stu Bangas	3:51
9.	"Problem Solver" (featuring Scarface)	Luvineri; Brad Jordan; Janos Fulop	The Arcitype	4:05
10.	"Battle Hymn" (featuring Apathy, King Syze, Crypt the Warchild, Jus Allah, Esoteric, Blacastan, Celph Titled and Planetary)	Luvineri; Chad Bromley; Daniel Albaladejo; Marcus Albaladejo; James Bostick; Seamus Ryan; Ira Osu; Vic Mercer; Mario Collazo; Aaron Green	Mr. Green	6:27
11.	"Geometry of Business" (featuring La Coka Nostra)	Luvineri; George Carroll; William Braunstein; Muchita	Havoc	4:12
12.	"Jake LaMotta"	Luvineri; William Leigh; Cheyenne Fowler	Illinformed	3:55
13.	"7 Fires of Prophecy" (featuring Tragedy Khadafi)	Luvineri; Percy Chapman; Nick Doherty	Beatnick Dee	3:31
14.	"Cheesesteaks"	Luvineri; Lester Fernandez	Psycho Les	3:47
15.	"Cold, Dark, and Empty" (featuring F.T. and Smoke)	Luvineri; Winston Morris; Smoke; Jim Heffernan	Jack of All Trades	3:56
16.	"Razor Gloves" (featuring R.A. the Rugged Man)	Luvineri; R.A. Thorburn; Matthew Crabtree	MTK	3:50
17.	"Wolves Amongst the Sheep" (featuring Kool G Rap and Block McCloud)	Luvineri; Nathaniel Wilson; Ismael Diaz, Jr.; Lanciani	C-Lance	3:33
18.	"You Can't Be Neutral on a Moving Train"	Luvineri; Lanciani; Ibarra	C-Lance; JBL the Titan	7:28
Total length:				1:09:55

Bonus track
No.	Title	Producer(s)	Length
19.	"Kingdom Crusher" (featuring Block McCloud)	Paul Nice	3:06

== Personnel ==
- Vincenzo "Vinnie Paz" Luvineri – vocals
- Anthony "Q-Unique" Quiles – vocals (track 1)
- Felipe "Immortal Technique" Coronel – vocals (track 4)
- Lékan "Poison Pen" Herron – vocals (track 4)
- Christopher Lee "Baby Pun" Rios Jr. – vocals (track 5)
- Whispers – vocals (track 5)
- Wilbur "Blaq Poet" Bass – vocals (track 6)
- Kejuan "Havoc" Muchita – vocals (track 8), producer (track 11)
- Albert "Prodigy" Johnson – vocals (track 8)
- Brad "Scarface" Jordan – vocals (track 9)
- Chad "Apathy" Bromley – vocals (track 10)
- Daniel "King Syze" Albaladejo – vocals (track 10)
- Marcus "Crypt the Warchild" Albaladejo – vocals (track 10)
- James "Jus Allah" Bostick – vocals (track 10)
- Seamus "Esoteric" Ryan – vocals (track 10)
- Ira "Blacastan" Osu – vocals (track 10)
- Vic "Celph Titled" Mercer – vocals (track 10)
- Mario "Planetary" Collazo – vocals (track 10)
- George "Slaine" Carroll – vocals (track 11)
- William "Ill Bill" Braunstein – vocals (track 11)
- Percy "Tragedy Khadafi" Chapman – vocals (track 13)
- Winston "F.T." Morris – vocals (track 15)
- Smoke – vocals (track 15)
- Richard "R.A. the Rugged Man" Thorburn – vocals (track 16)
- Nathaniel "Kool G Rap" Wilson – vocals (track 17)
- Ismael "Block McCloud" Diaz, Jr. – vocals (track 17)
- Jay "Shylow" Khan – scratches (track 6)
- Dave "DJ Kwestion" Klein – scratches (tracks: 13, 16)
- Mireya Ramos – strings (track 14)
- Eric "DJ Eclipse" Winn – scratches (track 14)
- Leor "DJ Lethal" Dimant – producer (track 1)
- Craig "C-Lance" Lanciani – producer (tracks: 2, 5, 17, 18)
- Chris "DJ Premier" Martin – producer (track 3)
- Tony Kenyatta – producer (track 4)
- Marco "Marco Polo" Bruno – producer (track 6)
- J. "JBL The Titan" Ibarra – producer (tracks: 7, 18)
- Stuart "Stu Bangas" Hudgins – producer (track 8)
- Janos "Arcitype" Fulop – producer (track 9)
- Aaron "Mr. Green" Green – producer (track 10)
- William "Illinformed" Leigh – producer (track 12)
- Nick "Beatnick Dee" Doherty – producer (track 13)
- Lester "Psycho Les" Fernandez – producer (track 14)
- Jim "Jack Of All Trades" Heffernan – producer (track 15)
- Matthew "MTK" Crabtree – producer (track 16)
- Scott "Supe" Stallone – engineering, mixing
- Mike 13 – engineering (track 3)
- Toure "Southpaw" Harris – additional vocal recording (track 4)
- Joe Nardone – mixing (track 6)
- Daniel "Spent D'Nero" Mawyin – mixing (track 14)
- Peter Humphreys – mastering
- Dan Bradley – design, layout
- Aaron Marsh – illustration

== Charts ==
Chart (2012)	Peak position
UK R&B Albums (OCC)	34
US Billboard 200	102
US Top R&B/Hip-Hop Albums (Billboard)	16
