= Cenobites (album) =

1997 studio album by The Cenubites

The Cenobites LP

Studio album by the Cenobites
- Released: 1997 (LP); 2000 (CD)
- Recorded: 1993–1994
- Genre: Hip-hop
- Length: 37:31
- Label: Fondle 'Em Records
- Producers: Bobbito Garcia (exec.); Godfather Don

The Cenobites chronology
The Cenubites EP (1995)	The Cenobites LP (1997)	Demented Thoughts EP (2008)

The Cenubites LP is the eponymous debut album by the American hip-hop duo The Cenubites, composed of rapper Kool Keith and producer Godfather Don. It was first released as an EP in 1995 via Fondle 'Em Records and was later expanded for LP in 1997 and CD in 2000. Percee P and Bobbito Garcia made guest appearances on the record.

== History ==
In 1992, South Bronx innovators Ultramagnetic MC's recruited little known MC/producer Godfather Don to assist them on their third LP, The Four Horsemen. The dark, jazzy sound he contributed was something of a departure for the group, which was known for its futuristic funk. During and after the album's recording, additional material featuring Kool Keith and Godfather Don was created for The Cenubites side project.

Radio personality Bobbito Garcia aka DJ Cucumberslice, a longtime fan and supporter of Ultramagnetic, dropped The Cenubites EP in 1995 on his own Fondle 'Em label. He also made his rapping debut as a featured performer on two of the disc's eight tracks. Another South Bronx veteran, Percee P, also contributed a guest appearance. All the artists involved with the project were regulars on WKCR's Stretch Armstrong radio show in the early '90s, of which Bobbito was co-host.

Rumour has it that this album was recorded in a week, during a period where Kool Keith & Godfather Don locked themselves away from the outside world (in a basement), only adding additional vocals after they emerged from their retreat. This would be in keeping with the name of the group "Cenubite", as Cenubites are monks who would often shun the outside world in favor of a hermit type of life.

== Release ==
Originally released as a seven-track extended play in 1995, it was reissued as nine-track longplay record with two more tracks added into it and retitled the Cenobites LP. A CD version was finally issued in 2000 with another bonus track, an extended version of Ultramagnetic MCs' "Checkin' My Style" renamed "Return To Zero", which boasted a previously omitted Godfather Don verse.

A handful of The Cenubites tracks remain officially unreleased including: "You Lose," "Lazy Woman," "Cold Peein' On 'Em," "Break 'Em Down" and "We Can Do This (ft. Mike L & TR Love)". In addition, Kool Keith and Godfather Don appeared together on Raw Breed's "Rampage/Outta Control" with the legendary Melle Mel, and reunited in 1998 for Godfather Don's "Voices".

== Track listing ==
1995 EP

All music is composed by Godfather Don.

Side A
No.	Title	Length
1.	"Lex Lugor"	3:45
2.	"You're Late" (featuring Percee P)	3:45
3.	"Kick a Dope Verse" (featuring Bobbito)	4:11
4.	"How the Fuck you Get a Deal"	5:43

Side B
No.	Title	Length
5.	"Rhymes I Sniff AKA Carlos Died"	4:18
6.	"Mommy"	3:23
7.	"I Was Forgotten"	3:51

1997 LP

All music is composed by Godfather Don.

Side A
No.	Title	Length
1.	"Lex Lugor"	3:45
2.	"I Was Forgotten"	3:51
3.	"Kick a Dope Verse" (featuring Bobbito)	4:11
4.	"Mommy"	3:23
5.	"You're Late" (featuring Percee P)	3:45

Side B
No.	Title	Length
6.	"Rhymes I Sniff AKA Carlos Died"	4:18
7.	"Keep On" (featuring Bobbito)	4:10
8.	"How the Fuck you Get a Deal"	5:43
9.	"Kick a Dope Verse" (Battered Baby Seal Remix)	4:16
Total length:		37:31

2000 CD bonus track
No.	Title	Length
10.	"Return to Zero" (Bonus track)	4:19
Total length:		38:00

== Personnel ==
- Rodney Chapman – main artist, producer, vocals
- Keith Matthew Thornton – main artist, vocals
- Bobbito Garcia – featured artist, executive producer
- John Percy Simon – featured artist
- Christopher Scott – mastering

== Release history ==
Region	Date	Format(s)	Label(s)
United States	1995	12"; EP; Vinyl	Fondle 'Em Records
United States	1997	LP; Vinyl	Fondle 'Em Records
United States	2000	CD; Vinyl	Fondle 'Em Records
