= PRhyme 2 =

Studio album by PRhyme
- Released: March 16, 2018
- Recorded: April 2016 – November 3, 2017
- Studio: Heaven Studios (Birmingham, Michigan); Isolation Studios (Detroit, Michigan); Kaufman Astoria Studios (New York); Mix Factory Studios (Southfield, Michigan); Plymouth Rock Studios (Plymouth, Michigan)
- Genre: Hip-hop
- Length: 52:57
- Label: PRhyme; INgrooves
- Producer: Royce da 5'9" (exec.); DJ Premier (also exec.); Big K.R.I.T.; Mr. Porter

Royce da 5'9" chronology
Layers (2016)	PRhyme 2 (2018)	Book of Ryan (2018)

DJ Premier chronology
PRhyme (2014)	PRhyme 2 (2018)	Light-Years (2025)

Singles from PRhyme 2
- 1. "Era" Released: February 1, 2018; 2. "Rock It" Released: February 22, 2018; 3. "Flirt" Released: March 5, 2018

PRhyme 2 is the second studio album by American hip-hop duo PRhyme, consisting of Royce da 5'9" and DJ Premier. Produced entirely by DJ Premier, the album features samples composed by producer AntMan Wonder. It was released on March 16, 2018 via their own record label PRhyme Records and INgrooves Music Group, and is a sequel to the eponymous album PRhyme. The album features guest appearances from rappers 2 Chainz, Big K.R.I.T., Dave East, Rapsody, Roc Marciano, Yelawolf, Chavis Chandler, bassist Brady Watt and singers Novel (as a part of duo Summer of '96 with Wonder), CeeLo Green and Denaun Porter.

== Background ==
As early as September 2015, Royce mentioned rappers Eminem, Kendrick Lamar, and The Game on Twitter as possible featured artists on PRhyme 2. On February 18, 2016 in an interview with Vibe, Royce stated that in April of the same year that he and DJ Premier were going to begin recording songs for the album: "I can tell you that me and Preem are going in April to do PRhyme 2." A year later on March 16, 2017 in an interview with Billboard, Premier stated that PRhyme 2 was nearing completion but still needed to have features and mixing on the songs: "PRhyme 2 is almost done. I'm one song away from finishing but we still have to mix and we have features. We still got to get all the features locked down." Two months later on May 18, it was revealed that Royce and Premier were in the studio working on the album. Six months later on November 3, both Royce and Premier officially announced that PRhyme 2 was completed and that they were planning a release date. On February 25, 2018, the tracklist and cover art were released.

== Critical reception ==
Professional ratings
Aggregate scores
Source	Rating
Metacritic	74/100
Review scores
Source	Rating
AllMusic	4/5 stars
Consequence of Sound	B−
Exclaim!	8/10
Pitchfork	6.1/10
XXL	4/5 (XL)

PRhyme 2 received mostly favorable reviews. At Metacritic, which assigns a normalized rating out of 100 to reviews from mainstream publications, the album received an average score of 74, based on 6 reviews, indicating "generally favorable reviews". Neil Z. Young at AllMusic commented that "combined with hard-hitting beats, old-school scratching, and a dizzying maze of dense rhymes, PRhyme 2 satisfies more than its predecessor and should please fans of Smoke DZA and Pete Rock's collaborative Don't Smoke Rock, Run the Jewels' more laid-back material, and the Dilated Peoples catalog." Scott Glaysher of XXL compared it to their previous album and noted the varying content that Royce frequently switched from: "Despite PRhyme 2 being twice as long as its nine-track predecessor, Premier never defaults to redundant sounds. "1 of the Hardest" loops a head-banging guitar riff, "Era" uses twinkly synths that rapidly alternate between left and right speaker channels, "Flirt" sports a classic New York bassline and chorus that nods to Camp Lo's "Luchini"—and that's just to name a few of the album's different flavors. Musically and lyrically, PRhyme 2 holds its own next to its precursor."

Kyle Mullin of Exclaim! praised PRhyme 2 for DJ Premier's production and Royce's subject matter on the album but criticized it for not being as sufficient of an effort as there was on the previous effort, calling CeeLo Green's hook on the track "Gotta Love It" "cloying" and "Flirt" being "laughably clunky" and "brutally sexist". Karas Lamb at Consequence of Sound appreciated the "building bridges between hip-hop's veterans and rising icons, who will predict the size and shape of the next wave", but felt that Royce's "appetite for glory also makes room for ego and showmanship to muddy the final mix". Lamb questioned the choice behind Premier's "decision to lean on other producers for the sound" for the previous album and PRhyme 2, calling it "curious and unnecessary". Jonah Bromwich of Pitchfork was also interested in the choice, stating that it was an "unusual constraint" and said that "sometimes, the veteran Detroit rapper [Royce] transcends his natural Buddenism, avoiding corny punchlines, esoteric lyrical easter eggs, and bars that lead him nowhere. At other times, he doesn't."

== Track listing ==
- All tracks are produced by DJ Premier.
- All tracks written by Ryan Montgomery, Christopher Martin, and Anthony Reid, (Note: Real name of AntMan Wonder.) except where noted.

No.	Title	Writer(s)	Length
1.	"Interlude 1 (Salute)"	Ryan Montgomery; Christopher Martin; Anthony Reid	0:39
2.	"Black History"	Montgomery; Martin; Reid	3:42
3.	"1 of the Hardest"	Montgomery; Martin; Reid	2:43
4.	"Era" (featuring Dave East)	Montgomery; Martin; Reid; David Brewster, Jr.	3:32
5.	"Respect My Gun" (featuring Roc Marciano)	Montgomery; Martin; Reid; Rakeem Myer	3:10
6.	"W.O.W. (With Out Warning)" (featuring Yelawolf)	Montgomery; Martin; Reid; Michael Atha	3:29
7.	"Sunflower Seeds" (featuring Novel for Summer of '96)	Montgomery; Martin; Reid; Alonzo Stevenson	3:34
8.	"Streets at Night"	Montgomery; Martin; Reid	3:31
9.	"Rock It"	Montgomery; Martin; Reid	3:49
10.	"Loved Ones" (featuring Rapsody)	Montgomery; Martin; Reid; Marlanna Evans	3:15
11.	"My Calling"	Montgomery; Martin; Reid	2:14
12.	"Made Man" (featuring Big K.R.I.T. and Denaun Porter)	Montgomery; Martin; Reid; Justin Scott; Denaun Porter	3:42
13.	"Relationships (Skit)"	Montgomery; Martin; Reid	0:43
14.	"Flirt" (featuring 2 Chainz)	Montgomery; Martin; Reid; Tauheed Epps	3:20
15.	"Everyday Struggle" (featuring Chavis Chandler)	Montgomery; Martin; Reid; Chavis Chandler	2:41
16.	"Do Ya Thang"	Montgomery; Martin; Reid	4:22
17.	"Gotta Love It" (featuring CeeLo Green and Brady Watt)	Montgomery; Martin; Reid; Thomas Callaway; Brady Watt	4:37
Total length:			52:57

== Personnel ==
Credits adapted from AllMusic.

PRhyme

- Ryan Montgomery - composition, A&R, executive producer
- Christopher Martin - producer (all tracks), composition, executive producer, mixing, scratching, vocal engineer

Additional personnel

- Anthony Reid - composition, sample source
- Brady Watt - composition, bass guitar
- Parks Valley - mixing, vocal engineer
- Jason "Asar" Qualls - vocal engineer
- I.V. Duncan - vocal engineer
- Ryan Hyland - vocal engineer
- Brian "B-Jones" Jones - vocal engineer
- Tony Dawsey - mastering
- Amanda Demme - creative director, photography
- Christopher Ardell - layout

== Charts ==
Chart (2018)	Peak position
Canadian Albums (Billboard)	92
US Billboard 200	40
US Top R&B/Hip-Hop Albums (Billboard)	23
US Independent Albums (Billboard)	3
