= Chris Rivers =

American rapper (born 1993)

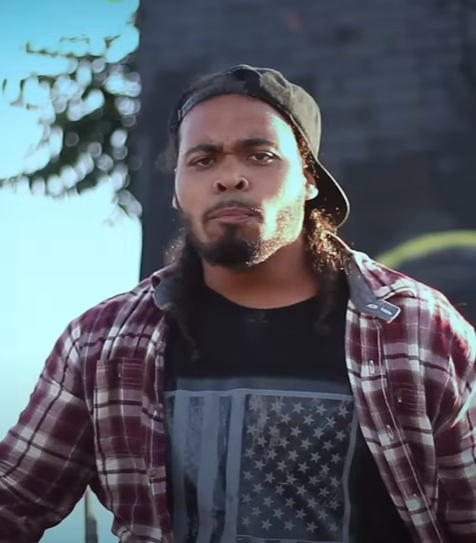
- Rivers, c. 2014

Background information
- Also known as: Baby Pun
- Born: Christopher Lee Rios Jr. November 15, 1993 (age 32); The Bronx, New York City, U.S.
- Genre: Hip hop
- Occupation: Rapper
- Years active: 2002–present
- Label: Mello Music Group
- Website: chrisriversmusic.com

Christopher Lee Rios Jr. (born November 15, 1993), known professionally as Chris Rivers and formerly Baby Pun, is an American rapper. He is the son of the late rapper Big Pun. Emerging from the underground hip hop scene in the Bronx, he came to prominence originally being known as Big Pun's son, in addition to appearing in the music video for his father's song "It's So Hard", from the 2000 album Yeeeah Baby.

== Early life ==
Rivers was born on November 15, 1993, in the South Bronx in New York City to parents of Puerto Rican descent. His father is Chris Rios, Sr., also known as Big Pun, and his mother is Liza Rios. He grew up in many parts of The Bronx, New York. Rivers initially started pursuing a hip hop career when he was eight and then professionally at eighteen. His father died in early 2000 when he was 6.

== Career ==
Chris Rivers began his music career in 2002 as a member of a group called 3 Down, consisting of himself, Ray Ray (Benzino's son), and Lil James. They released a single called "Baby Boo", featuring Brenda Russell, shortly before disbanding.

Chris Rivers has had collaborations with various artists including Wu-Tang Clan, The Lox, Termanology, Tony Sunshine, Vinnie Paz, Chino XL, Joell Ortiz, Canibus, and Cormega. He was originally known as Baby Pun. His style is said to be similar to that of his father.

== Discography ==
- Wonderland of Misery (2013)
- Wonderland of Misery 2: The Good King (2014)
- The Good King EP (2014)
- Medicated Consumption (2016)
- Medicated Consumption 2.0: The Refill (2016)
- Delorean (2017)
- G.I.T.U. (2019)
