= Screwball (group) =

American hip hop group

- Origin: New York City, New York, US
- Genre: Hip hop
- Years active: 1996–2004
- Labels: Tommy Boy; Landspeed Records; Hydra Entertainment
- Members: Blaq Poet; Solo
- Past members: KL (deceased); Hostyle (deceased)

Screwball is an American underground hip hop quartet from Queensbridge New York City, composed of rappers Hostyle, KL, Blaq Poet and Solo. The group has released two studio albums, Y2K: The Album in 2000 and Loyalty in 2001, and a compilation album Screwed Up in 2004.

Their first album, Y2K, released by Tommy Boy Records, was a minor success, reaching number 50 on the US Top R&B/Hip-Hop Albums chart. It featured contributions from Godfather Don, Big Noyd, Capone, Cormega, MC Shan, Mobb Deep, Nature, Pete Rock and Marley Marl among others, and included two chart singles: "H-O-S-T-Y-L-E" produced by Mike Heron and "F.A.Y.B.A.N. (Fuck All You Bitch Ass Niggas)" produced by DJ Premier. The follow-up album, Loyalty, released by Landspeed Records, had more success than its preceder, peaking at number 185 on the US Billboard 200 and number 44 on the Top R&B/Hip-Hop Albums. It featured contributions from Ayatollah, Kool G Rap, N.O.R.E., Tragedy Khadafi, The Beatnuts, Cormega, Godfather Don and Nature among others. Its lead single, "Torture" produced by Lee Stone, featured M.O.P. and became the group's highest charted single at No. 78 on the Hot R&B/Hip-Hop Songs and #2 on the Hot Rap Songs charts. All the group members, along with Noyd, R.A. the Rugged Man and their frequent collaborator Godfather Don, appeared on Hostyle's first solo album, One Eyed Maniac, released on June 29, 2004, by Hydra Entertainment. In July 2004, the group released a compilation of new and old material, Screwed Up, which was named after their first single and is considered their final project. KL died in 2008 of an asthma attack and Hostyle died in 2020.

== Members ==
=== The Poet ===
Wilbur Bass a.k.a. Poet was earlier heard in the diss song "Beat You Down" towards Boogie Down Productions from the Bridge Wars during 1987. As a part of hip hop group PhD with Dante "DJ Hot Day" Franklin, he released the duo's only studio album, Without Warning, on August 31, 1991, through Tuff City Records. The album is not well known, but his lyrical flow and content give the album its share of publicity. The album's only guest star was young Cormega on the track "Set It Off". After several singles by PhD, Poet and Hot Day parted ways in 1996 due to being unable to find another record label.

Blaq Poet's first solo album, Rewind: Deja Screw, was released in 2006 by Traffic Entertainment Group and featured his own production skills along with contributions from DJ Premier, Alchemist, Easy Mo Bee, Teflon, with KL the only featured Screwball member. In the same year, he signed with DJ Premier's Year Round Records. Poet and DJ Premier appeared on the song "The Victory" by KRS-One and Marley Marl's album Hip Hop Lives, which ended KRS and Poet's rivalry during the Bridge Wars. He also appeared on the NYG'z first 2007 album, Welcome 2 G-Dom, also released by Year Round Records. Poet's second solo album, Tha Blaqprint, was dropped on June 30, 2009.

=== Hostyle ===
Fredrick Ivey( a.k.a. Hostyle) released his first solo album, One Eyed Maniac, on Hydra Entertainment on June 29, 2004. He also appeared on DJ Muggs's 2000 Soul Assassins II, Infamous Mobb's 2002 Special Edition and Cormega's 2007 album Who Am I?. Hostyle's sons, Fred Jr and Jasuan Ivey, continue their father's legacy by making music as well.

He reportedly died in January 2020.

=== KL ===
Kenneth Lewis (a.k.a. KL), a cousin of Blaq Poet, was also part of a duo called Kamakazee with fellow Screwball member Kyron "Solo" Jones and released a couple of underground 12" singles in the late 1990s and early 2000s, often produced by Marley Marl. In 2006, KL appeared on the Molemen album, Killing Fields, on the song "Street Conflict", with Cormega, and fellow Screwball member Hostyle. KL died on March 28, 2008, of an asthma attack. Upon his death, DJ Premier said, "His hardcore delivery and raspy voice was well known in many circles...He is already up in ghetto heaven, so his music will live through all of us that love him."

=== Solo ===
Kyron Jones (a.k.a. Solo) appeared on Marley Marl's 2001 come-back album Re-Entry.

== Discography ==
- Y2K: The Album
  - Released 2000
  - Singles: "F.A.Y.B.A.N.", "H-O-S-T-Y-L-E"
  - Label: Tommy Boy Records
- Loyalty
  - Released 2001
  - Singles: "Torture"
  - Label: Landspeed Records
- Screwed Up
  - Released: July 19, 2004
  - Singles: "I Ain't Saying Nothing"
  - Label: Hydra Entertainment
