= Rewind: Deja Screw =

Studio album by Blaq Poet
- Released: March 21, 2006
- Recorded: 2004–2006
- Genre: Hip-hop
- Label: Traffic Entertainment
- Producer: DJ Premier, 45 Scientific, The Alchemist, Blaq Poet, Easy Mo Bee

Blaq Poet chronology
Without A Warning (1991)	Rewind: Deja Screw (2006)	Tha Blaqprint (2009)

Singles from Rewind: Deja Screw
- 1. "Poet Has Come" Released: 2003; 2. "Watch Your Back" Released: 2006

Professional ratings
Review scores
Source	Rating
Unkut.com	3.5/5

Rewind: Deja Screw is the debut studio album by American Queensbridge hip-hop emcee Blaq Poet since 1991's Without A Warning together with producer DJ Hot Day. Released on March 21, 2006 through Traffic Entertainment, the album features a mix of old and new verses by Poet over all new beats, hence the title. The three main producers are 45 Scientific from France, DJ Premier, and Blaq Poet himself, although Easy Mo Bee and the Alchemist both contribute a track each. Poet's cousin, KL, who died in early 2008, makes three appearances on the LP.

== Track listing ==
No.	Title	Producer	Length
1.	"Bang This"	DJ Premier	3:09
2.	"Ghetto Shit"	45 Scientific	3:40
3.	"Message from Poet"	DJ Premier	2:51
4.	"Bomb Shit" (featuring KL, J Roc & Verse)	45 Scientific	4:36
5.	"Bloody Mess"	The Alchemist	4:01
6.	"Watch Your Back"	DJ Premier	3:35
7.	"The Cash"	45 Scientific	3:18
8.	"My Nigga" (featuring Team Shug)	Blaq Poet	3:39
9.	"What Ya'll Gonna Do?"	45 Scientific	3:40
10.	"Poet Has Come"	DJ Premier	4:06
11.	"You Fucked Up"	Easy Mo Bee	3:36
12.	"After All This Time"	45 Scientific	3:28
13.	"Rhyme Crime Boss"	Blaq Poet, DJ Sincere	4:06
14.	"Hard to Believe"	45 Scientific	3:27
15.	"Psycho"	Blaq Poet	3:03
16.	"Still Flippin'"	45 Scientific	3:23
17.	"The Cash Pt. 2"	Blaq Poet	3:02
18.	"Mind of a Criminal" (featuring Teflon, KL & J Roc)	45 Scientific	3:52
