= PRhyme =

American hip hop duo

- Origin: Detroit, Michigan, U.S. Brooklyn, New York City, U.S.
- Genres: Hip hop
- Years active: 2014–present
- Labels: PRhyme; INgrooves
- Members: Royce da 5'9"; DJ Premier

PRhyme is an American hip hop duo composed of Detroit-based rapper Royce da 5'9" and New York–based record producer DJ Premier. They created their own record label PRhyme Records and released their first album, PRhyme, on December 9, 2014, and its follow-up, PRhyme 2, on March 16, 2018. The production of each album is based on sampling a single artist's compositions: Adrian Younge for PRhyme and AntMan Wonder for PRhyme 2. When the concept was originally pitched to Premier, he viewed it as a challenge since he recognized that he was previously known for his beats from obscure samples from many different sources, and this project forced him to find what he needed from a single catalogue of work. For PRhyme 2, Royce described the process of receiving compositions to work off of directly from AntMan Wonder as being "like sampling from Mozart but Mozart is actually giving you the music". The duo also appeared on the Southpaw soundtrack. In 2021, DJ Premier confirmed PRhyme 3 is in the works.

== Discography ==
Studio albums

Year	Title	Peak chart positions			Notes
Year	Title	Billboard 200	Top R&B/Hip-Hop Albums	Independent Albums	Notes
2014	PRhyme: Release date: December 9, 2014; Label: PRhyme, INgrooves	59	7	6	Featured artists: Ab-Soul, Black Thought, Common, Dwele, Jay Electronica, Joey Bada$$, Killer Mike, Logic, Mac Miller, MF Doom, Phonte, Schoolboy Q, Slaughterhouse
2018	PRhyme 2: Release date: March 16, 2018; Label: PRhyme, INgrooves	40	23	3	Featured artists: 2 Chainz, Big K.R.I.T., Brady Watt, Cee-Lo Green, Chavis Chandler, Dave East, Denaun Porter, Novel, Rapsody, Roc Marciano, Yelawolf
