= Tha Blaqprint =

Studio album by Blaq Poet
- Released: June 30, 2009
- Recorded: 2006–2009
- Genre: Hip-hop
- Length: 51:52
- Labels: Year Round Records, Fat Beats Records
- Producers: DJ Premier, Easy Mo Bee, Gemcrates

Blaq Poet chronology
Rewind: Deja Screw (2006)	Tha Blaqprint (2009)	Blaq Poet Society (2011)

Singles from Tha Blaqprint
- 1. "Ain't Nuttin Changed" Released: 2009

Professional ratings
Review scores
Source	Rating
AllMusic	link
HipHopDX	link
HipHopSite.Com	4.5/5 stars
The Message Blog	(94/100) link
PopMatters	link
Remixmag	link
Time Out	link

Tha Blaqprint is the second studio album by American hip-hop recording artist Blaq Poet, released June 30, 2009 on DJ Premier's record label Year Round Records via Fat Beats Records. It features guest appearances by the also Year Round Records signed group NYGz and Nick Javas, Capone-N-Noreaga member N.O.R.E., Imani Montana, Lil' Fame from M.O.P., and the late Screwball member KL. The album was entirely produced by DJ Premier, except for two tracks: "U Phucc’d Up", produced by Easy Mo Bee, and "Sichuwayshunz", produced by Gemcrates.

Several tracks have been released on various mixtapes, such as "Blaq Out" or "No Talent Required", dating back to 2006. The album's lead single, "Ain't Nuttin' Changed", has been released in February 2009. There's also a remix version to the single, released in June 2009. It features verses by MC Eiht from Compton's Most Wanted and Young Maylay from Ice Cube's Lench Mob Records.

== Reception ==
HipHopDX described the album as "an extremely well-made and engrossing hip-hop album."

== Track listing ==
=== CD 1 ===
- All songs produced by DJ Premier, except for track 2 by Easy Mo Bee and track 9 by Gemcrates

#	Title	Guest Performer(s)	Samples	Time
1	"I-Gititin"		"The Bridge" by MC Shan; "Tha Way It Iz" by Big Shug	3:48
2	"U Phucc’d Up"	KL	"The Facade" by Melba Moore	3:36
3	"Ain’t Nuttin' Changed"		"Daisy Lady" by 7th Wonder; "Hundreds and Thousands of Guys" by Patti Drew; "Ain't No Woman (Like the One I've Got)" by Four Tops; "I'll Still Kill" by 50 Cent	3:39
4	"What’s the Deal?"		"That Lets Me Know I'm in Love" by McFadden & Whitehead	3:06
5	"Legendary Pt. 1"	Nick Javas, NYGz	"Heartz of Men" by 2Pac; "Warning" by the Notorious B.I.G.; "Get Down" by Nas	3:34
6	"Hood Crazy"		"Get on the Good Foot" by James Brown	3:55
7	"Voices"		"Masterpiece" by Grover Washington, Jr.; "Street Rondo" by Thijs van Leer	3:41
8	"Hate"	N.O.R.E.	"Looking at the Front Door" by Main Source; "Da Mystery of Chessboxin'" by Wu-Tang Clan	3:11
9	"Sichuwayshunz"		"How Do You Feel the Morning After" by Millie Jackson	4:17
10	"Stretch Marks & Cigarette Burns"	Panchi, Imani Montana	"You + Me = Love" by the Undisputed Truth; "Gangsta Gangsta" by N.W.A	3:20
11	"S.O.S."		"Run Away" by Billy Strange	3:27
12	"Let the Guns Blow"		"All in Love Is Fair" by Nancy Wilson; "Superthug" by Noreaga	2:37
13	"Don’t Give a Fucc"		"Les Tueurs" by Reinhardt Wagner; "Blind Alley" by the Emotions; "Shook Ones Part II by Mobb Deep	2:55
14	"Rap Addiction"	Lil' Fame, Shabeeno	"City Rider" by The Ebbinghouse Orchestra; "I Ain't No Joke" by Eric B. & Rakim; "Breaker, Breaker" by GZA; "Two Turntables & a Mic" by Black Moon	3:39
15	"Never Goodbye"		"Girl, I Wanna Get Right Up Next to You" by Mammatapee; "Never Can Say Goodbye" by the Jackson 5	3:00

=== CD 2 (instrumentals) ===
- All songs produced by DJ Premier, except for track 2 by Easy Mo Bee and track 9 by Gemcrates

#	Title	Performer(s)	Time
1	"I-Gititin"	*Instrumental*	3:48
2	"U Phucc’d Up"	*Instrumental*	3:36
3	"Ain’t Nuttin Changed"	*Instrumental*	3:39
4	"What’s the Deal?"	*Instrumental*	3:06
5	"Legendary Pt. 1"	*Instrumental	3:34
6	"Hood Crazy"	*Instrumental*	3:55
7	"Voices"	*Instrumental*	3:41
8	"Hate"	*Instrumental*	3:11
9	"Sichuwayshunz"	*Instrumental*	4:17
10	"Stretch Marks & Cigarette Burns"	*Instrumental*	3:20
11	"S.O.S."	*Instrumental*	3:27
12	"Let the Guns Blow"	*Instrumental*	2:37
13	"Don’t Give a Fucc"	*Instrumental*	2:55
14	"Rap Addiction"	*Instrumental*	3:39
15	"Never Goodbye"	*Instrumental*	3:00
