= PRhyme (album) =

Studio album by PRhyme
- Released: December 9, 2014
- Recorded: 2014
- Studio: DPA Studios (Oak Park, Michigan); Headqcourterz Studios (New York City)
- Genre: Hip-hop
- Length: 34:47
- Label: PRhyme; INgrooves
- Producer: Royce da 5'9" (exec.); DJ Premier (also exec.)

Royce da 5'9" chronology
Success Is Certain (2011)	PRhyme (2014)	Layers (2016)

DJ Premier chronology
Kolexxxion (2012)	PRhyme (2014)	PRhyme 2 (2018)

Singles from PRhyme
- 1. "Courtesy" Released: October 17, 2014

PRhyme is the debut studio album by American hip-hop duo PRhyme, consisting of Royce da 5'9" and DJ Premier. The album was released on December 9, 2014, through their own record label PRhyme Records. The album features guest appearances from rappers Killer Mike, Jay Electronica, Common, Ab-Soul, Schoolboy Q, Slaughterhouse, Mac Miller and soul singer Dwele. PRhyme features production by DJ Premier, as well as samples from psychedelic soul composer and producer Adrian Younge. The album was supported by the single "Courtesy". A sequel, PRhyme 2, was released on March 16, 2018.

== Background ==
On September 15, 2014, it was announced Royce da 5'9" and DJ Premier would be releasing a collaborative album. In September 2014, Royce da 5'9" and DJ Premier spoke about the album, saying: "I want people to appreciate the fact that we didn't compromise in lieu of the environment. In order to try to change the way that people digest music, we had to take a leap of faith," says Royce. DJ Premier adds, "The bar has to be high. For this album to be another body of work and another chapter for both of our lives." On October 17, 2014, the album's first single "Courtesy" was released. On October 22, 2014, the music video was released for "U Looz". On November 20, 2014, the music video was released for "PRhyme". On November 24, 2014, the teaser was released for "Courtesy". On April 1, 2015, the music video was released for "You Should Know". On October 26, 2015, the music video was released for "Courtesy".

== Critical reception ==
Professional ratings
Aggregate scores
Source	Rating
Metacritic	84/100
Review scores
Source	Rating
AllMusic	4/5 stars
Exclaim!	8/10
HipHopDX	4/5 stars
RapReviews	8.5/10
Tom Hull – on the Web	B+
XXL	4/5 (XL)

PRhyme received universal acclaim from music critics. At Metacritic, which assigns a normalized rating out of 100 to reviews from critics, the album received an average score of 84, which indicates "universal acclaim", based on 5 reviews. Fred Thomas of AllMusic said, "The formula for PRhyme is a simple one of inventively constructed beats and passionate rhyming from all involved. Sounding both effortless and intricately composed at once, PRhyme is an instant classic, and one that sounds better and better as repeated listenings reveal more of the details hiding behind the album's deceptively straightforward approach." Sheldon Pearce of HipHopDX said, "Part of the magic of PRhyme lies in its murky depths, which come courtesy of Younge's soulful live compositions sampled by Premier in a rare deviation from his typical exploratory tactics. Premier has always had a penchant for sampling whatever he stumbles upon, but the refined selection of this endeavour, despite mildly restricting the great producer, makes for a cohesive listening experience."

== Track listing ==
All tracks are produced by DJ Premier.

No.	Title	Writer(s)	Length
1.	"PRhyme"	Ryan Montgomery; Christopher Martin; Adrian Younge	3:54
2.	"Dat Sound Good" (featuring Ab-Soul and Mac Miller)	Montgomery; Martin; Younge; Herbert Stevens; Malcolm McCormick	3:31
3.	"U Looz"	Montgomery; Martin; Younge	1:34
4.	"You Should Know" (featuring Dwele)	Montgomery; Martin; Younge; Andwele Gardner	4:34
5.	"Courtesy"	Montgomery; Martin; Younge	3:30
6.	"Wishin'" (featuring Common)	Montgomery; Martin; Younge; Lonnie Lynn	4:19
7.	"To Me, To You" (featuring Jay Electronica)	Montgomery; Martin; Younge; Timothy Thedford	5:11
8.	"Underground Kings" (featuring Schoolboy Q and Killer Mike)	Montgomery; Martin; Younge; Quincy Hanley; Michael Render	4:14
9.	"Microphone Preem" (featuring Slaughterhouse)	Montgomery; Martin; Younge; Dominick Wickliffe; Joe Budden; Joell Ortiz	4:00
Total length:			34:47

Deluxe version (bonus tracks)
No.	Title	Length
10.	"Golden Era" (featuring Joey Bada$$)	4:16
11.	"Wishin' II" (featuring Black Thought)	5:48
12.	"Highs and Lows" (featuring MF Doom and Phonte)	4:37
13.	"Mode II" (featuring Logic)	7:07
Total length:		56:35

== Personnel ==
Credits adapted from AllMusic.

PRhyme

- Ryan Montgomery – composition, art direction, executive producer
- Christopher Martin – composition, executive producer, mixing, producer (all tracks), scratching

Additional personnel

- Don Morris – art direction
- Amanda Demme – artwork, photography
- Parks Valley – mixing, vocal engineer
- Tony Dawsey – mastering
- I.V. Duncan – vocal engineer

== Charts ==
=== Weekly charts ===
Chart (2014)	Peak position
US Billboard 200	59
US Digital Albums (Billboard)	18
US Independent Albums (Billboard)	6
US Top R&B/Hip-Hop Albums (Billboard)	7

=== Year-end charts ===
Chart (2015)	Position
US Top R&B/Hip-Hop Albums (Billboard)	95
