= Hydra Entertainment =

Hydra Entertainment is a hip hop record label specializing in Instrumental hip hop. They are most notable for their Hydra Beats series of instrumental albums by prominent hip hop producers. All of its releases are out of print.

Hip hop group Screwball also released several records on Hydra.

== Discography ==
- Hydra Beats Volume 1 The Unsociables
- Hydra Beats Volume 2 E-Boogie
- Hydra Beats Volume 3 Godfather Don
- Hydra Beats Volume 4 A Kid Called Roots
- Hydra Beats Volume 5 The Beatnuts, 1997
- Hydra Beats Volume 6 Ghetto Pros
- Hydra Beats Volume 7 Godfather Don
- Hydra Beats Volume 8 Anniversary Compilation
- Hydra Beats Volume 9 A Kid Called Roots
- Hydra Beats Volume 10 Ghetto Pros, 1997
- Hydra Beats Volume 11 Godfather Don
- Hydra Beats Volume 12 Nick Wiz
- Hydra Beats Volume 13 A Kid Called Roots
- Hydra Beats Volume 14 Godfather Don
