= Blaq Poet =

American rapper

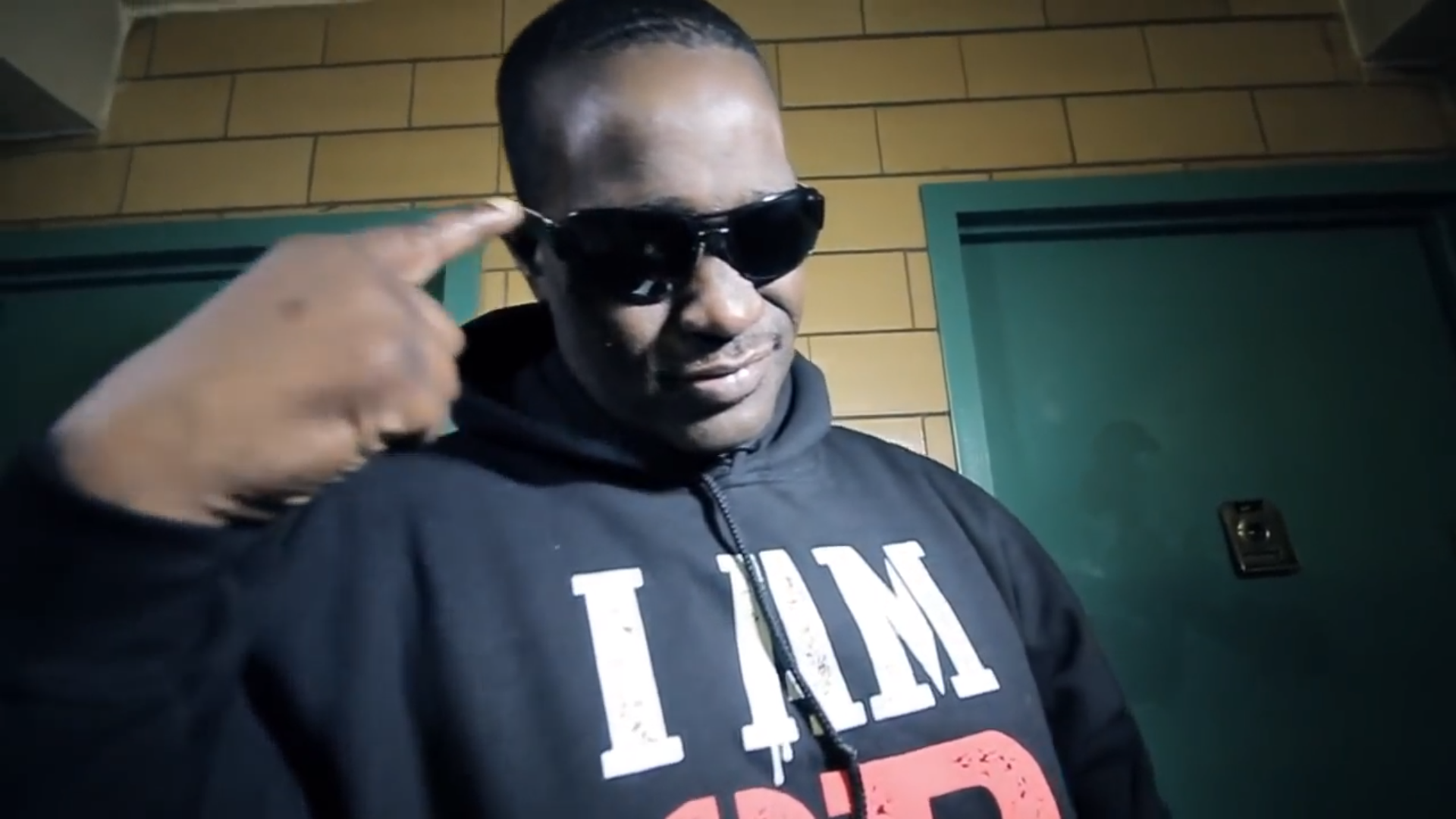
- Screenshot of Blaq Poet from music video "Catch My Drift" by Ruc featuring Blaq Poet

Background information
- Also known as: The Poet
- Born: Wilbur Bass; May 31, 1969 (age 57)
- Origin: Queensbridge, New York City, U.S.
- Genres: Hip-hop
- Years active: 1987–present
- Labels: Year Round Records, Aggravated Mayhem, Brick Records, Mad Men Entertainment
- Spinoffs: Blaq Poet & Serious Truth (Hiphop Duo)

Wilbur Bass (born May 31, 1969), better known as Blaq Poet, is an American rapper from Queensbridge, New York City.

== Biography ==
Blaq Poet was first heard on the track "Beat You Down" from the Bridge Wars during 1987, a diss song towards KRS-One and Boogie Down Productions. At that time, Poet was at least 17 years old, as stated in a 2009 radio interview.

During 1991, Poet and DJ Hot Day made a duo called PHD (Poet & Hot Day) and released their debut album, Without Warning, on Tuff City Records. They released after that album several 12-inch singles and an EP until 1996 when they parted ways due to being unable to find another record label. Poet went on to team up with KL, Hostyle and Solo, creating the group Screwball. They released two albums and a compilation together before Poet went solo with the street album Rewind: Deja Screw, released in 2006. The album featured production from DJ Premier amongst others.

In 2007, Poet appeared on the track "Victory" on KRS-One and Marley Marl's 2007 album Hip Hop Lives, which was released as proof that the Bridge Wars had ended.

Poet later signed to DJ Premier's label Year Round Records, and he released his second album, Tha Blaqprint, on that label in 2009. The majority of the production was by DJ Premier, and guest appearances were made by the likes of Lil' Fame and Noreaga, as well as Poet's Year Round labelmates the NYGz and Nick Javas. On the remix version of “Ain't Nuttin' Changed”, a single from Tha Blaqprint, Poet collaborated with West Coast rappers MC Eiht and Young Maylay.

On August 14, 2026, Poet appeared on A-F-R-O's single, "Barb Wire," from his compilation album, Trap Door 2.

== Blaq Poet & Serious Truth ==
On November 3, 2020, Blaq Poet released an LP with Serious Truth entitled Cultural Revolution to critical acclaim. Inspired by current events, the album is also focused on returning hip hop back to its roots and original cultural standards. Cultural Revolution has become a cult classic among hardcore hip hop fans and DJs alike, accumulating 120,000 views, listens and streams across all platforms. Upon its release, the album frequently received airplay on radio stations in the UK, Germany, Belgium and the US, as well as DJ Premier's radio show on SiriusXM.

Blaq Poet and Serious Truth released a followup sophomore album, Digital Opium, on January 1, 2026. Digital Opium was recorded in the two years proceeding their acclaimed freshman album Cultural Revolution. Proving word of mouth among hip hop fans to be more powerful than pre-release marketing, pre-promotion and media coverage, Digital Opium racked up an impressive 99,180 streams within the first week of its release, in contrast to the lack of coverage from hip hop websites, magazines and established critics. Songs from Digital Opium did hit the Sirius XM airwaves, receiving spins on the Rap Is Outta Control show hosted by DJ Eclipse. Digital Opium features production from Buckwild of D.I.T.C. fame, Stu Bangas, with additional production, composition, mixing and mastering handled by Serious Truth. Digital Opium also features REKS, Krumbsnatcha and Termanology on track 8 as well as Sean Price, Big Twins and Krumbsnatcha on track 13.

== Discography ==
- 1991: Without Warning (collaboration with DJ Hot Day as PHD)
- 2006: Rewind: Deja Screw
- 2009: Blaq Out
- 2009: Tha Blaqprint (produced by DJ Premier)
- 2011: Blaq Poet Society (produced by Stu Bangas & Vanderslice)
- 2012: E.B.K. - EveryBody Killa
- 2013: Blaq Death (produced by Stu Bangas & Vanderslice)
- 2016: The Most Dangerous
- 2016: Mad Screws (collaboration with Comet)
- 2019: EST: Experience, Stories and Truths (EP)
- 2019: Smoke (EP, with Comet & Astro Vandalist)
- 2020: Scribes (EP)
- 2020: Simon Phoenix
- 2020: Cultural Revolution (collaboration with Serious Truth)
- 2026: Digital Opium (collaboration with Serious Truth)

== Guest appearances ==
List of non-single guest appearances, with other performing artists, showing year released and album name
Title	Year	Other artist(s)	Album
"Crime Library"	2012	Vinnie Paz	God of the Serengeti
"Villains"	2013	J.O.D	
"Posse Cut"	2009	R.A The Rugged Man, Hell Razah, Jojo Pellegrino	Legendary Classics Volume 1
"Close to the Edge"	2021	The Nicewun JM	Celebratin' Hip Hop... Over Here
