= Guru discography =

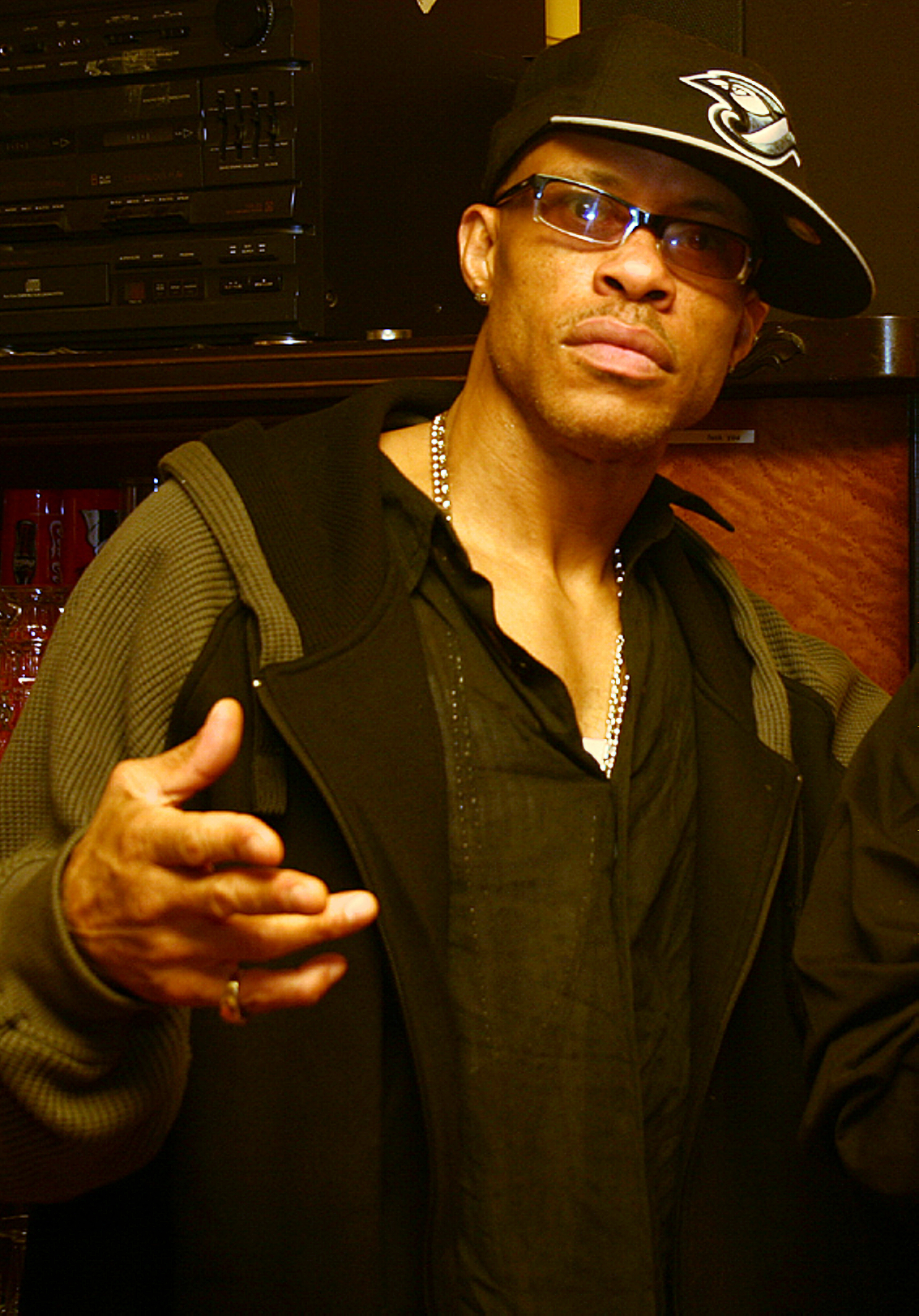
- Studio albums: 7
- Compilation albums: 2
- Remix albums: 1
- Mixtapes: 1

This is the discography for American hip hop musician Guru.

== Studio albums ==
List of studio albums, with selected chart positions
Title	Album details	Peak chart positions									
Title	Album details	US	US HH	AUS	FRA	GER	NED	NZ	SWE	SWI	UK
Guru's Jazzmatazz, Vol. 1	Released: May 18, 1993; Label: Chrysalis	94	15	62	139	43	67	24	49	—	58
Guru's Jazzmatazz, Vol. 2: The New Reality	Released: July 18, 1995; Label: Chrysalis	71	16	39	—	24	30	25	19	8	12
Guru's Jazzmatazz, Vol. 3: Streetsoul	Released: October 3, 2000; Label: Virgin	32	8	—	42	26	33	18	26	29	—
Baldhead Slick & da Click	Released: September 25, 2001; Label: Landspeed	122	22	—	—	—	—	—	—	—	—
Version 7.0: The Street Scriptures	Released: May 10, 2005; Label: 7 Grand	—	54	—	—	—	—	—	—	—	—
Guru's Jazzmatazz, Vol. 4: The Hip Hop Jazz Messenger: Back to the Future	Released: July 31, 2007; Label: 7 Grand, V2	—	45	—	155	—	—	—	—	55	—
Guru 8.0: Lost and Found	Released: May 19, 2009; Label: 7 Grand	—	—	—	—	—	—	—	—	—	—
"—" denotes releases that did not chart, or was not released in that country.

== Remix albums ==
List of mixtape albums, showing year released
Title	Details
Jazzmatazzmixx	Released: 1995; Label: Chrysalis

== Compilation albums ==
List of compilation albums, showing year released
Title	Details
Guru Presents Ill Kid Records	Released: 1995; Label: Payday, FFRR
The Best of Guru's Jazzmatazz	Released: February 12, 2008; Label: Virgin

== Mixtapes ==
List of mixtape albums, showing year released
Title	Details
Jazzmatazz the Timebomb: Back to the Future Mixtape	Released: July 31, 2007; Label: 7 Grand, Rapster Records

== Guest appearances ==
Year	Artist	Album	Track	With
1991	Nice & Smooth	Ain't a Damn Thing Changed	Down the Line	Asu, Bās Blasta, Melo T& Preacher Earl
1992	Heavy D & The Boyz	Blue Funk	A Buncha Niggas	Biggie Smalls, Busta Rhymes, Rob-O & Third Eye
1993	Various	Menace II Society (soundtrack)	Stop Lookin' at Me	The Cutthroats
1993	Various	Addams Family Values (soundtrack)	Do It Any Way You Wanna (It's on You)	
1993	De La Soul	Buhloone Mindstate	Patti Dooke	
1993	Ronny Jordan	The Quiet Revolution	Season for Change	
1994	Nefertiti	L.I.F.E.	No Nonsense	
1994	Digable Planets	Blowout Comb	Borough Check	
1994	DJ Krush	Krush (Japanese import only)	B-Boy Mastermind	
1995	DJ Krush	Meiso	Most Wanted Man	Big Shug
1995	Ini Kamoze	Lyrical Gangsta	Who Goes There	
1995	Various	Guru Presents: Ill Kid Records	Life; Momentum	M.O.P., Stikken Moon; Big Thug
1996	Various	Get on the Bus (soundtrack)	Destiny Is Calling	
1996	China	China	All of Me	
1996	House of Pain	Truth Crushed to Earth Shall Rise Again	Fed Up (Remix)	
1996	Various	The New Groove: The Blue Note Remix Project	Listen Here	
1997	Various	Rhyme & Reason (soundtrack)	The Way It Iz	KaiBee, Lil' Dap
1997	Various	The 6th Man (soundtrack)	The Illest Man	
1997	Buckshot LeFonque	Music Evolution	Black Monday	
1998	Jon B.	I Do (Watcha Say Boo) (12")	Cool Relax (remix)	
1998	Barrington Levy	Living Dangerously	One 4 Me	Jigsy King
1998	Afu-Ra	Whirlwind Thru Cities (12")	Trilogy of Terror	Hannibal Stax
1998	Luther Vandross	I Know	Nights in Harlem (Darkchild Extended Remix)	
1999	Group Home	A Tear for the Ghetto	Be Like That	Blackadon
1999	Choclair	Ice Cold	Bare Witness	
1999	Sway & King Tech	This or That	NY Niggaz	
1999	Bob Marley	Chant Down Babylon	Johnny Was	
1999	Medeski Martin & Wood	Combustication Remix EP]	Whatever Happened to Gus (Word to the Drums Mix)	
2000	Ed O.G.	The Truth Hurts	Work for It	
2000	Various	Once in the Life (soundtrack)	Choices	Bobbi Humphrey, N'Dea Davenport, Taurus
2000	Various	Any Given Sunday (soundtrack)	Any Given Sunday	Jamie Foxx, Common
2000	D-Flame	Basstard	Universal	
2000	Big L	The Big Picture	Games	Sadat X
2001	Sade	King of Sorrow 12"	King of Sorrow (Guru Remix)	
2001	Adam F	Kaos: The Anti-Acoustic Warfare	Karma	Carl Thomas
2001	Dilated Peoples	Expansion Team	Worst Comes to Worst	
2002	D&D All Stars	D&D Project II	Hot Shit	Big Daddy Kane, Sadat X, Greg Nice
2002	DJ Cam	Soulshine	Condor (Espionage)	
2002	Jigmastas	Grassroots (Prologue)	So What	
2003	BT	Emotional Technology	Knowledge of Self	
2003	Prince Paul	Politics of the Business	Not Tryna Hear That/Words (Album Leak)	Planet Asia, Wordsworth
2003	Spax	Engel und Ratten	Träume	
2004	Chief Kamachi	Cult Status	The Best	
2004	Hasstyle	Bx-tra	Gotta Have You!	Selena Cerrron
2004	Goin' Through	La Sagrada Familia	Αυτή Τη Ζωή (This Life)	
2005	The Perceptionists	Black Dialogue	Party Hard	Camu Tao
2006	Ferry Corsten	L.E.F.	Junk	
2007	Domingo	The Most Underrated	Major Game	
2007	Slightly Stoopid	Chronchitis	The Otherside	
2008	Downsyde	All City	Watucamehere 4	
2010	Cradle Orchestra	Transcended Elements	You Got to Luv It	
