= Antidote (disambiguation) =

An antidote is a substance which can counteract a form of poisoning.

Antidote, Antidotes or The Antidote may also refer to:

== Music ==
=== Groups and labels ===
- Antidote (band), punk band from the Netherlands formed in 1996
- Antidote, a 1980s New York hardcore punk band that featured Drew Stone and Arthur Googy
- Antidote Records, UK independent record label
- Antidote Shanghai, group of music producers and DJs in China
- Antidote, a collaboration of Dutch band The Ex and UK band Chumbawamba for their 1987 7-inch EP Destroy Fascism!
- Hot Rod Circuit, emo band from Alabama that originally formed under the name "Antidote"

=== Albums ===
- Antidotes (album), 2008 release by Foals
- The Antidote (Benzino album), 2007
- Antidote (Chick Corea album)
- The Antidote (Fashawn album), 2009
- The Antidote (Indo G and Lil' Blunt album), 1995
- The Antidote (Ronny Jordan album), 1992
- The Antidote (Moonspell album), 2003
- The Antidote (Morcheeba album), 2005
- The Antidote (The Wiseguys album), 1999
- Soundpieces: Da Antidote, 1999 album by Lootpack

=== Songs ===
- "Antidote" (Swedish House Mafia song), a 2011 song by Swedish House Mafia vs. Knife Party
- "Antidote" (Travis Scott song), 2015
- "Antidote", a 2000 song by Cameo Sexy Sweet Thing
- "Antidote", a 1999 song by The Fall from their album The Marshall Suite
- "Antidote" (Kang Daniel song), a 2021 song by Kang Daniel from his EP Yellow
- "Antidote", a 2024 single by Guy Sebastian feat. Sam Fischer
- "The Antidote", a 2016 song by Memphis May Fire from their album This Light I Hold
- "The Antidote", a 2022 song by Simple Plan from their album Harder Than It Looks
- "The Antidote", a 2008 song by Story of the Year from their album The Black Swan

== Other uses ==
- L'Antidote, a 2005 French comedy film
- Antidote (2021 film), a science fiction horror film
- Antidote (2024 film), an American-British documentary film
- Antidote Films, a New York independent film company
- "The Antidote", a 1978 episode of The Bionic Woman
- "Antidotes", a Series A episode of the television series QI (2003)
- The Antidote: Happiness for People Who Can't Stand Positive Thinking, a 2012 book by Oliver Burkeman
- "The Antidote", nickname of Mark Coleman, wrestler and mixed martial artist
- Antidote (software), writing assistance software by the Canadian company Druide informatique

== See also ==
- Anecdote
