= Jazzmatazz =

Series of hip hop and jazz recordings from Guru

Jazzmatazz is a series of hip hop and jazz recordings from American rapper Guru.

In a 2009 interview he reflected, "Back around '93—when I first came up with the Jazzmatazz concept—I was noticing how a lot of cats were digging in the crates and sampling jazz breaks to make hip hop records. But while I thought that was cool, I wanted to take it to the next level and actually create a new genre by getting the actual dudes we were sampling into the studio to jam over hip hop beats with some of the top vocalists of the time. You know, the whole thing was experimental, but I knew it was an idea that would spawn some historic music."

Some of those involved in the creation of the work have included N'Dea Davenport, Carleen Anderson, Courtney Pine, Branford Marsalis, Roy Ayers, Donald Byrd, Lonnie Liston Smith, MC Solaar, Dee C Lee, Chaka Khan, and various members of british band Jamiroquai.

The term Jazzmatazz is also used as a slang term to mean an extreme a situation which can be described as "jazzy". It represents a situation with the jazzyness of "extra jazzy".

== Albums ==
- Guru's Jazzmatazz, Vol. 1, 1993
- Guru's Jazzmatazz, Vol. 2: The New Reality, 1995
- Guru's Jazzmatazz, Vol. 3: Streetsoul, 2000
- Guru's Jazzmatazz, Vol. 4: The Hip Hop Jazz Messenger: Back to the Future, 2007
- Guru's Jazzmatazz: The Timebomb Back to the Future Mixtape, 2007
- The Best of Guru's Jazzmatazz, 2008
