= Acid jazz =

Music genre

- The logo of Acid Jazz Records, where the name was coined
- Stylistic origins: Jazz fusion; soul; disco; dance-rock; hip-hop; funk; psychedelia
- Cultural origins: 1980s, London, United Kingdom
- Derivative forms: Nu jazz; jazz rap

Acid jazz (also known as club jazz, psychedelic jazz, or groove jazz) is a music genre that combines elements of funk, soul, and hip-hop. Acid jazz originated in clubs in London during the 1980s with the rare groove movement and spread to the United States, Western Europe, Latin America and Japan. Acts included The Brand New Heavies, Incognito, James Taylor Quartet, Us3, and Jamiroquai from the UK, and Guru, Buckshot LeFonque and Digable Planets from the U.S. The rise of electronic club music in the middle to late 1990s led to a decline in interest, and in the twenty-first century, acid jazz became indistinct as a genre. Many acts that might have been defined as acid jazz are seen as jazz-funk, or nu jazz.

== Characteristics ==
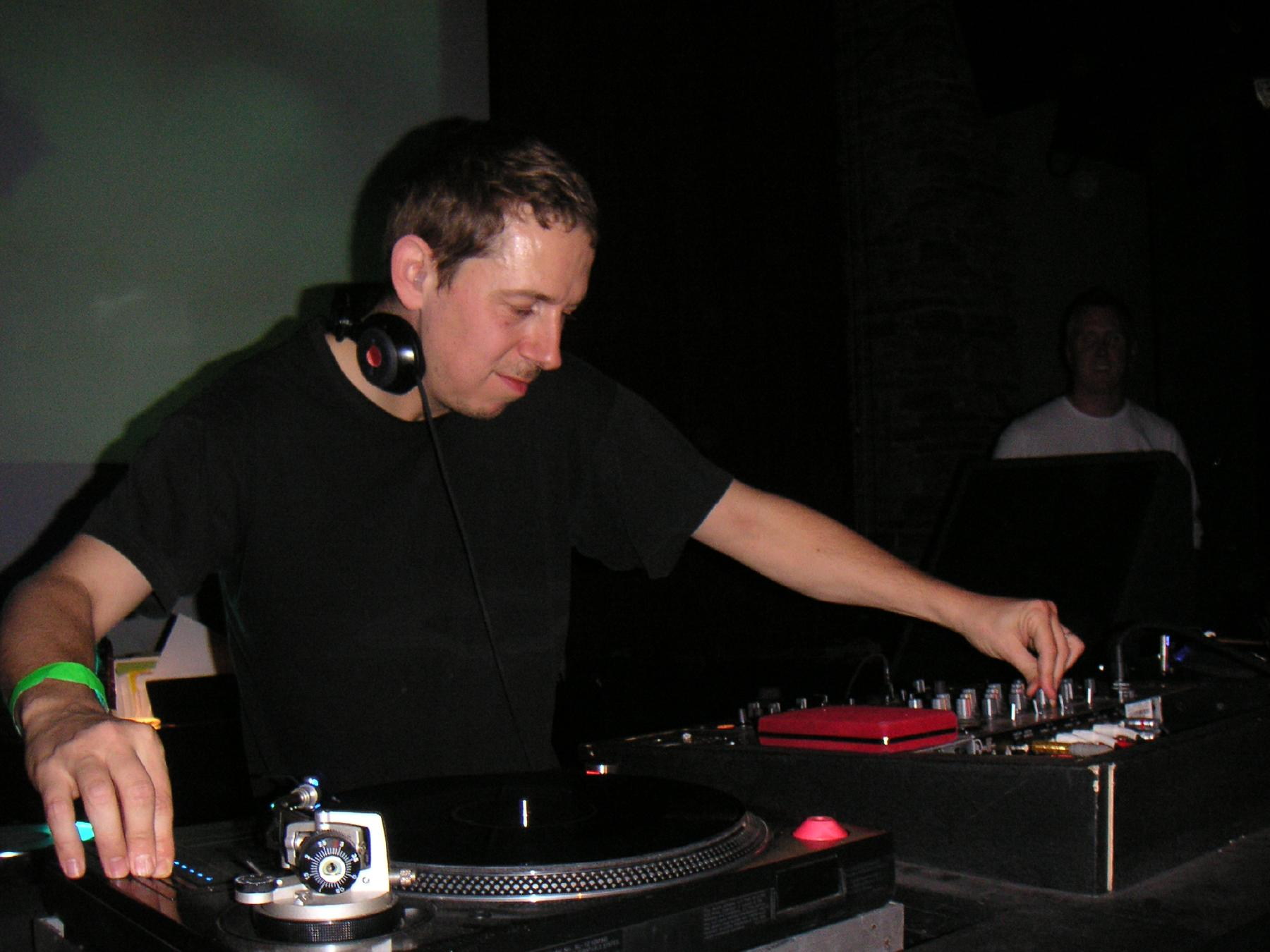
French-English disc jockey Gilles Peterson invented the term "acid jazz".

=== Etymology ===
The genre's name was likely coined by Gilles Peterson, and the record label with the name was started by Chris Bangs, Eddie Piller, and Gilles. The name refers to the acid house genre, which was popular in UK clubs in the 1980s. However, acid jazz is not an electronic music genre and has no relationship with the music genres named "acid" (acid house, acid trance, acid techno, etc.), which are heavily based on the "acid-like" sound, produced by the Roland TB-303 electronic music synthesizer. DJs Femi Williams and Marco Nelson from Young Disciples claimed in a recently unearthed 1992 TV interview that they coined the term because they had a club with acid playing downstairs and jazz upstairs, so they thought it would be amusing to name the upstairs room "The Acid Jazz Room". The veracity of this claim predating Peterson's is dubious, as the interview in question took place five years after the Acid Jazz label was created, and Young Disciples were first active three years after the formation of the label.

=== Evolution ===
Acid jazz consisted of two related movements. The first was based on records by disc jockeys and music producers who added percussion and electronic dance beats to jazz tracks from the 1960s and 1970s. The second movement included groups who were influenced by these recordings and who emphasized a groove. Acid jazz borrowed from jazz, funk, and hip-hop. Because it relies heavily on percussion and live performance, it is sometimes associated with jazz, but its emphasis on groove aligns it more with funk, hip-hop, and dance music. The style is characterized by danceable grooves and long, repetitive compositions. Acid jazz bands usually include horns, a rhythm section (bass guitar, drum set and additional percussion), a vocalist who may sing or rap, and a DJ.

== History ==
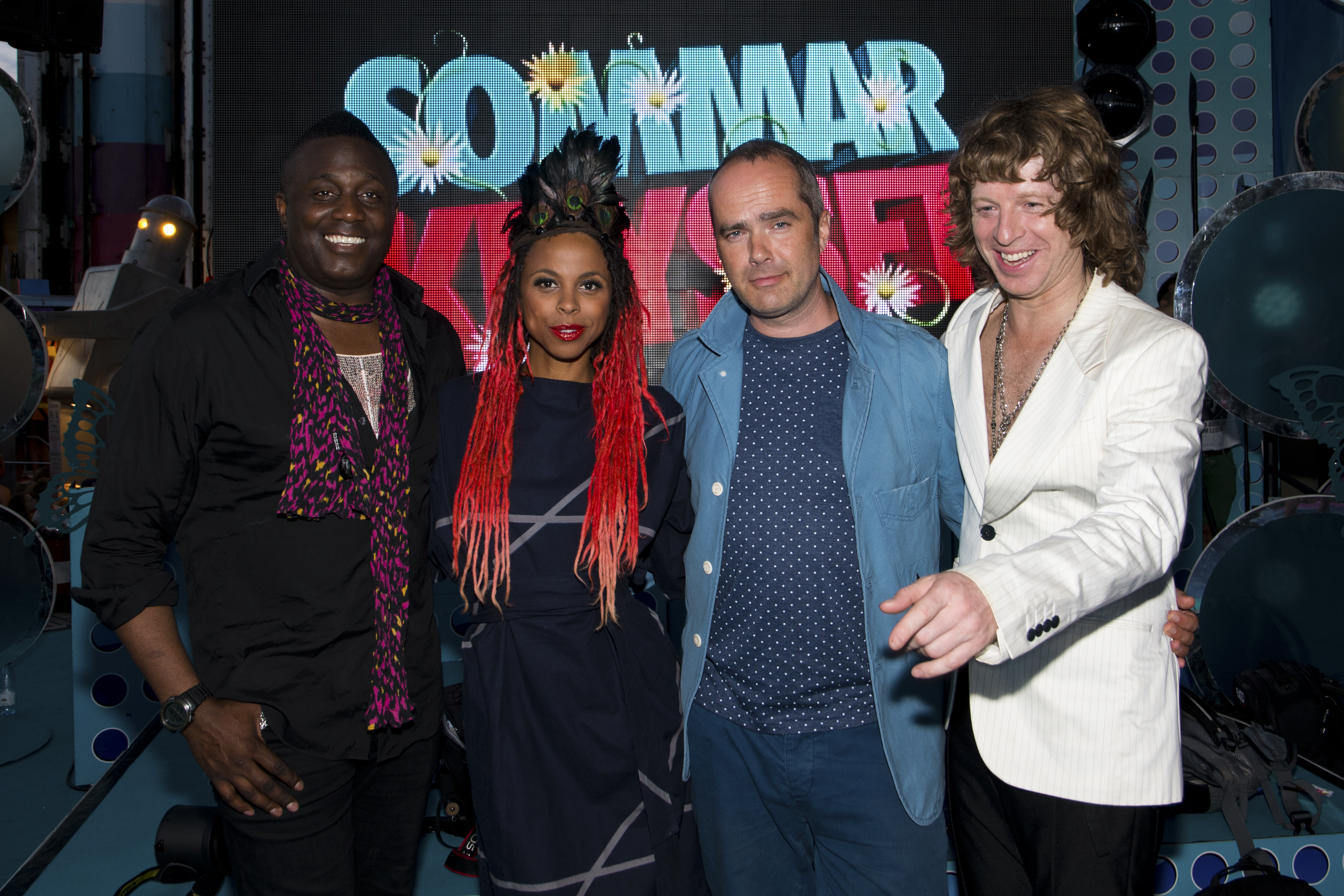
Brand New Heavies in 2013

=== Origin ===
Acid jazz has its origins in the 1950s, 1960s, when psychedelic styles were being incorporated into other musical genres, jazz being one of these. Acid jazz became popular in London clubs during the 1980s when disc jockeys associated with the rare groove movement played obscure jazz records. Their interests were in the fringe of jazz fusion, jazz funk, and the soul jazz of 1960s. Particularly significant were records from the Blue Note catalogue. These DJs included Gilles Peterson, who had residencies at several London clubs in the 1980s. Peterson began in a small pirate radio station and then moved to the larger Kiss-FM. In 1988 with producer Eddie Piller he formed the label Acid Jazz Records. The first release from the company was the compilation Totally Wired, which contained obscure jazz funk tracks from the 1970s with updated new tracks.

In 1990 Peterson left to start the label Talkin' Loud at Phonogram. The company signed Galliano, Young Disciples, and Urban Species. Another British record label, Fourth and Broadway Records, was formed in 1990 and began a compilation series with the title "The Rebirth of Cool". The label's roster included Pharoah Sanders, Stereo MCs, MC Solaar, and Courtney Pine.

In 1991 acid jazz broke into the mainstream with the success of Brand New Heavies. After one self-titled album (1990) with Acid Jazz Records, the group signed with FFRR Records and had the hit singles "Never Stop" and "Dream Come True". Other bands included Incognito and Us3, whose "Cantaloop (Flip Fantasia)" (1993) was the biggest hit in the genre. Also successful was Jamiroquai, an early act for Acid Jazz Records that signed with Sony, which released Travelling Without Moving (1996) and the hit single "Virtual Insanity". Other live acts included Stereo MCs and the James Taylor Quartet. The mainstream success of acid jazz was followed by many compilations which left the public confused about the genre.

=== Acid jazz in the US ===
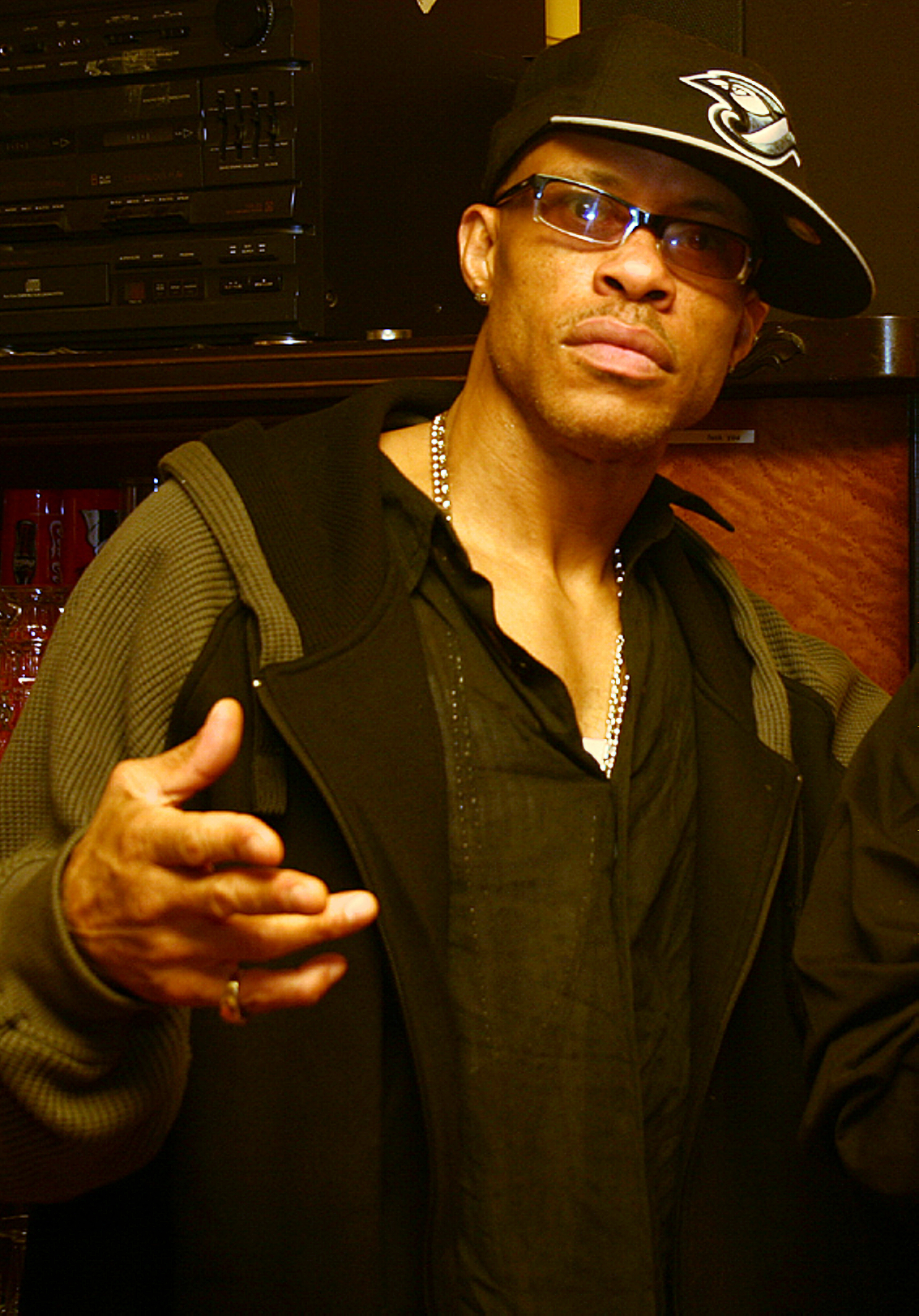
Guru, who recorded with Jazzmatazz

Acid jazz spread to the United States in the early 1990s. It reached New York City in 1990 when British promoter Maurice Bernstein and his South African partner Jonathan Rudnick opened Groove Academy as a party at the Giant Step club in the basement of the Metropolis Café in Union Square. Groove Academy turned into a record label and media company. Acid jazz musicians in New York City included Brooklyn Funk Essentials, DJ Smash, and Jerome Van Rossum. In San Francisco acid jazz was released by Ubiquity Records, by Solsonics in Los Angeles, and The Greyboy Allstars in San Diego.

A Tribe Called Quest borrowed from jazz for their album The Low End Theory (1991). Under the name Buckshot LeFonque, Branford Marsalis and Digable Planets won a Grammy Award for the 1993 single "Rebirth of Slick (Cool Like Dat)".

Formed in New York in 1990, Groove Collective produced their self-titled debut in 1993. The rapper Guru released a series of albums recorded with jazz musicians as the Jazzmatazz series.

Stemming from Chicago in 1993, Liquid Soul achieved a national profile in 1996 when their self-titled debut LP was re-released by Ark21. In 2000 their album Here's the Deal was nominated in the Grammy Award for Best Contemporary Jazz Album category.

=== Around the world ===
Acid jazz soon gained an international following, including in Japan, Germany, Brazil and Eastern Europe. From Japan, United Future Organization gained an international reputation, signing an American record deal in 1994. Other acts include Mondo Grosso and Gota Yashiki in Japan, and Skalpel in Poland.

=== Decline ===
The rise of electronic club music in the mid- to late-1990s led to a decline in interest in acid jazz among the record buying public, although the genre continued to have a reduced worldwide following. In the twenty-first century the movement became so intertwined with other forms that it became indistinct as a genre and many acts that might have been defined as acid jazz are now seen as jazz funk, neo soul or jazz rap.

Q magazine stated "Acid jazz was the most significant jazz form to emerge out of the British music scene". One major legacy of the genre is its influence on the jam band movement, with acid jazz proving a suitable medium for extended improvisation for acts such as Medeski, Martin and Wood and The Greyboy Allstars.

== See also ==
- Broken beat
- Deep funk
- Groovera
- Jazz-funk
- Ninja Tune
- Trip hop
- Dorado Records
