= Jaku =

Jaku may refer to:

- Jaku language, Nigeria
- Jaku, principle of silence in the Japanese tea ceremony
- Jaku (album), Japanese hip-hop album by DJ Krush

== See also ==
- Jakku, a fictional desert planet in the Star Wars universe
