= The Opus =

American hip-hop group

- Origin: Chicago, Illinois, U.S.
- Genre: Hip-hop
- Years active: 1994–present
- Labels: Ozone Music; Tri-Eight Music Supplies; Mush Records; Indus Recordings
- Members: The Isle of Weight; Mr. Echoes
- Website: theopus.bandcamp.com

The Opus is an American hip-hop record production duo from Chicago, Illinois. It consists of The Isle of Weight and Mr. Echoes. AllMusic described them as "two of the most brilliant beatmakers working in hip-hop circa 2003."

The Isle of Weight (born Aaron Smith) and Mr. Echoes (born Kevin Johnson) first met while attending Proviso East High School together. In 1994, the duo started making music together. The duo handled the production work on Rubberoom's 1999 album Architechnology.

== Members ==
- The Isle of Weight (born Aaron Smith) - production
- Mr. Echoes (born Kevin Johnson) - production

== Discography ==
=== Studio albums ===
- First Contact 001 (2002)
- Breathing Lessons (2003)
- Praying Mantis-Plus (2010)

=== Compilation albums ===
- Blending Density (2010)
- The Opus of the Opus Vol. One (2010)
- The Opus of the Opus Vol. Two (2010)

=== EPs ===
- 0.0.0. (2002)
- Movement One (2002)
- Movement Two (2002)
- Movement Three (2002)
- Movement Four (2003)
- Movement Five (2004)
- Earthwalkers EP (2004)
- Praying Mantis EP (2010)
- The Save Me Gallery (2010)
- March of the Termites (2012)
- Man Down (2017)

=== Singles ===
- "Live" (2002)
- "Madhouse" (2004)
- "Up & Away" (2011)
- "International" (2011)
- "A Stainless Steel Xmas" (2011)

=== Productions ===
- Rubberoom - Gothic Architecture (1995)
- Rubberoom - Architechnology (1999)
- Thawfor - Where Thawght Is Worshiped (2001)
- DJ Krush - "Trihedron" from The Message at the Depth (2002)
- Sonic Sum - "Films (The Opus Remix)" from Operazor EP (2003)
- Verbal Kent - "Alien Rock" from What Box (2004)
- Eliot Lipp - "Its Time to Leave (The Opus Remix)" from Brolabs (2011)
