= Kioku =

Kioku (記憶, kioku) may refer to:

- Ki-Oku, a 1996 album by DJ Krush and Toshinori Kondo
- "Kioku" (Every Little Thing song), a 2002 single by Every Little Thing
- "Kioku", a song by Hayami Kishimoto from the 2003 album Meikyu
- "Kioku", a song by Fumiya Fujii from the 2004 album Cloverfield
- "Kioku" (Misia song), a 2011 single by Misia
