= Evig Poesi =

Norwegian hip-hop band

Evig Poesi (Norwegian for «eternal poetry») is an Oslo-based Norwegian rap group. The music is influenced by artists such as A Tribe Called Quest, De la Soul and DJ Krush.

Originally a Christian rap group, the members of the group and their beliefs have changed over time, to the point that the group today has lyrics criticising religion and superstition, embracing instead scientific wonder.

Evig Poesi were some of the first to seriously practice emceeing and freestyle sessions in Norwegian.

== History and discography ==
Evig Poesi was founded by rappers Petter Smart (real name Jon Petter Etnestad) and Deep Thought autumn 1998, and was first called MHC. The name quickly changed into Evig Poesi. After a couple of years of rhyme-writing, beat-production, concert-playing and freestyling, the EP Åndelig Føde was released May 2001. DJ Broder T joined the group during the summer of 2001. The Summer 2003, they released their second EP, "Drekka Melk". The video they made of this release got heavy rotation on Norwegian TV-Channels such as NRK, and ZTV. Etnestad began using his new pen name Smart 9000 as a producer, and stopped calling himself Petter Smart.

In January 2006 Evig Poesi released their first full-length album: "I Krig og Kjærlighet", ("In love and war").

After the release the group changed. For a while it defined itself as a loose collective of artists and musicians, all connected to the MC/producer Smart 9000. Eventually, Smart 9000 teamed up with new addition André Jensen, and Evig Poesi took the form of a duo. The group's days of preaching Christianity were over.

Since then the group has released several albums:

In 2011 they released the album "Verdens Ende" ("The World's End") as Evig Poesi, Conurbia and Definite. This was a collaboration with Trondheim rap duo Conurbia and Oslo based rapper Definite, released on the underground record label Bonsaiety Records. The lead track from the album was "Djevelen i Detaljene" ("The Devil in the Details"), for which Evig Poesi produced their second professional music video.

In 2012 they released the album "Ingenting er Gratis" ("Nothing is Free") on their own, producing music videos for many of the tracks, and deliberately making the entire album freely downloadable (as an ironic wink at the title).

Both current group members (Smart 9000 and André Jensen) have continued making music independently, usually in collaborations with other artists. They have also competed in Norwegian freestyle rap competition "Skeez TV", and made a name for themselves there.
