= Kakusei =

Kakusei may refer to:

- Kakusei (Go), a Go competition in Japan
- Kakusei (album), an album by DJ Krush
- Fire Emblem: Kakusei, a Nintendo 3DS video game
