= Krush (album) =

Studio album by DJ Krush
- Released: January 21, 1994
- Studios: Show-On (Tokyo); Fastforward (Tokyo)
- Genre: Trip hop
- Length: 52:29
- Labels: Triad; Chance
- Producer: DJ Krush

DJ Krush chronology
Krush (1994)	Strictly Turntablized (1994)

Singles from Krush
- 1. "Big City Lover" Released: April 21, 1995

Krush is the debut studio album by Japanese hip-hop producer DJ Krush. It was released on January 21, 1994, in Japan by Triad – an imprint of Nippon Columbia – and Chance Records. Shadow Records released the album in the United States in 1995.

== Critical reception ==
Professional ratings
Review scores
Source	Rating
AllMusic	4/5 stars
RapReviews	10/10

Ned Raggett of AllMusic found DJ Krush's production "spare but effective, launching grooves that unfold just enough over the course of his tracks, edgy and slightly unnerving." Raggett wrote that DJ Krush "has a definite sound and style", but "also knows how to create any number of variations or twists with it, with fine results." Reviewing the album for Trouser Press, Mark Kemp dubbed Krush "a milestone, a dizzying collision of genres." Peter Shapiro, writing in Drum 'n' Bass: The Rough Guide (1999), said that it hinted at "the more effective monochromaticism" of DJ Krush's later music. In 2021, Krush was ranked at number 19 on Slant Magazine's list of the best trip hop albums of all time.

== Track listing ==
All music is composed by DJ Krush, except where noted.

No.	Title	Lyrics	Music	Length
1.	"AM 300 Tag"			0:52
2.	"B-Boy Mastamind"	Guru		4:17
3.	"Mixed Nuts"		DJ Krush; DJ Hide	1:11
4.	"Roll & Tumble"			5:08
5.	"Murder of Soul"	Ez'	DJ Krush; Edison	5:37
6.	"E.A.R.T.H./SOS"			0:52
7.	"On the Dub-ble"		DJ Krush; Kazufumi Kodama	5:43
8.	"Another Day"		DJ Krush; DJ Hide; DJ Red	0:21
9.	"Underneath the System"			0:52
10.	"Edge of Blue"			4:12
11.	"Big City Lover"	Sonya Vallet	DJ Krush; Edison	5:58
12.	"Down the Drain"			0:49
13.	"Into the Water"			4:48
14.	"Ruff-Neck Jam"			5:12
15.	"Keeping the Motion"	Monday Michiru	DJ Krush; Michiru	6:37
Total length:				52:29

Notes

- The US edition (total length: 48:12) omits "B-Boy Mastamind" and moves "Keeping the Motion" to track two.

Sample credits

- "Ruff-Neck Jam" contains samples of "La Nevada", performed by The Gil Evans Orchestra.
- "Keeping the Motion" contains samples of "Our Generation", performed by Ernie Hines.

== Personnel ==
Credits are adapted from the album's liner notes.

Musicians

- DJ Krush – beats, scratching
- DJ Hide – beats on "Mixed Nuts" and "Another Day"
- DJ Red – scratching and pitch control on "Mixed Nuts", beats on "Another Day"
- Guru – vocals on "B-Boy Mastamind"
- Takeharu Hayakawa – wood bass on "Roll & Tumble"
- Akihiro Ishiwatari – guitar on "Into the Water"
- Kazufumi Kodama – trumpet on "On the Dub-ble"
- Nobutaka Kuwabara – trumpet on "Edge of Blue"
- Osamu Marumoto – bass on "Edge of Blue"
- Monday Michiru – vocals on "Keeping the Motion"
- Midnight City Dwellers (Matsui, Oda, Shingo, DJ Red and DJ Hide) – performance on "AM 300 Tag"
- Koichiro Samukawa – alto saxophone and flute on "Ruff-Neck Jam"
- Ken Shima – piano on "Roll & Tumble"
- Carla Vallet – vocals on "Murder of Soul"
- Sonya Vallet – vocals on "Big City Lover"

Production

- DJ Krush – production, mixing
- Noriko Asano – executive production
- Osamu Marumoto – mixing, recording
- Koichi "Oppenheimer" Matsuki – mixing, recording
- Tomonori Sato – executive production
- Akihiko Takenaka – mastering

Design

- Bruno Dayan – photography
- Sakaguchi Ken Factory – art direction, design
