= Baldhead Slick & da Click =

Studio album by Guru
- Released: September 25, 2001
- Recorded: 2000–2001
- Studio: D&D Studios (New York City); Greene St. Recording (New York City); Waltz Studios (Boston, Massachusetts)
- Genre: Hip-hop
- Length: 71:56
- Label: Landspeed
- Producer: Guru; Adam West; Agallah; Alchemist; Ayatollah; Biggest Gord; Divine; DJ Premier; DJ Roach; DJ Spinna; DJ Yutaka; E-Boogie; G-Flexx; J-Love; Pete Rock; P.F. Cuttin'; Smitty; Stoupe the Enemy of Mankind; The Committee

Guru chronology
Guru's Jazzmatazz, Vol. 3: Streetsoul (2000)	Baldhead Slick & da Click (2001)	Version 7.0: The Street Scriptures (2005)

Professional ratings
Review scores
Source	Rating
AllMusic	1.5/5 stars
RapReviews	7.5/10

Baldhead Slick & da Click is the fourth solo studio album by American hip-hop musician Guru. It was released on September 25, 2001 via Ill Kid/Landspeed Records, marking Guru's first solo recording outside his Jazzmatazz series. Production was handled by Alchemist, Adam West, Agallah, Ayatollah, Biggest Gord, Divine, DJ Roach, DJ Spinna, DJ Yutaka, E-Boogie, Gang Starr, G-Flexx, J-Love, Pete Rock, P.F. Cuttin', Smitty, Stoupe the Enemy of Mankind and The Committee. It features guest appearances from Big Shug, Kaeson, Kreem.com, Lae D-Trigga, Mendoughza, New Child, Black Jesus, Bless, Blick Street, Don Parmazhane, Ed O.G., Gold D, Hannibal Stax, Hussein Fatal, Ice-T, James Gotti, Kapital Gainz, Killa Kaine, Killah Priest, Krumbsnatcha, Mr. Moe, Pete Powers, Smitty, Squala Orphan, Suspectz, Tef, Timbo King and Treach. The album peaked at number 122 on the Billboard 200, number 22 on the Top R&B/Hip-Hop Albums, number 5 on the Independent Albums and topped the Heatseekers Albums in the United States.

== Track listing ==
No.	Title	Producer(s)	Length
1.	"Where's Our Money?!"	Biggest Gord	3:24
2.	"Back 2 Back" (featuring Mendoughza)	DJ Premier	2:59
3.	"Rollin' Dolo" (featuring Ed O.G., Big Shug and Krumbsnatcha)	Agallah	3:56
4.	"No Surviving"	Guru; DJ Yutaka	3:31
5.	"Underground Connections" (featuring Ice-T and Suspectz)	E-Boogie	4:37
6.	"Niggaz Know" (featuring Treach, Kaeson and Gold D)	P.F. Cuttin'	4:03
7.	"In Here" (featuring Timbo King, Killah Priest and Black Jesus)	Alchemist	4:34
8.	"The Come Up" (featuring Kapital Gainz and Kreem.com)	Adam West	3:39
9.	"Cry"	Ayatollah	3:31
10.	"O.G. Talk" (featuring Tef and Don Parmazhane)	Divine	4:08
11.	"Pimp Shit" (featuring Kaeson and Kreem.com)	Pete Rock	4:56
12.	"Never Ending Saga" (featuring Lae D-Trigga and Bless)	G-Flexx; Guru	4:19
13.	"War Tactics" (featuring New Child, James Gotti and Hussein Fatal)	Stoupe the Enemy of Mankind	4:26
14.	"Collectin' Props" (featuring Killa Kaine, Mr. Moe and Pete Powers)	Alchemist	3:24
15.	"Revolutionist" (featuring Squala Orphan and Blick Street)	J-Love	3:37
16.	"No Grease" (featuring Mendoughza, New Child and Lae D-Trigga)	DJ Spinna	3:37
17.	"How You Gonna Be a Killa?" (featuring Smitty)	Smitty	3:31
18.	"Stay Outta My Face" (featuring Big Shug and Hannibal Stax)	The Committee	2:50
19.	"The Anthem"	DJ Roach	3:01
Total length:			1:11:56

Sample credits

- Track 4 contains parts of U-God's and Inspectah Deck's verses from Wu-Tang Clan's Da Mystery of Chessboxin'.

== Personnel ==
- Keith "Guru" Elam – main artist, producer (tracks: 4, 12), mixing (tracks: 1, 3–5, 7–10, 12–16, 18, 19), executive producer
- Mendoughza – featured artist (tracks: 2, 16)
- Cary "Big Shug" Guy – featured artist (tracks: 3, 18)
- Edward "Ed O.G." Anderson – featured artist (track 3)
- Demetrius "Krumb Snatcha" Gibbs – featured artist (track 3)
- Tracy "Ice-T" Marrow – featured artist (track 5)
- Suspectz – featured artist (track 5)
- Anthony "Treach" Criss – featured artist (track 6)
- Gold D. – featured artist (track 6)
- Kaeson – featured artist (tracks: 6, 11)
- Black Jesus – featured artist (track 7)
- Timothy "Timbo King" Drayton – featured artist (track 7)
- Walter "Killah Priest" Reed – featured artist (track 7)
- Kapital Gainz – featured artist (track 8)
- Kreem.com – featured artist (tracks: 8, 11)
- Linwood "Teflon" Starling – featured artist (track 10)
- Don Parmazhane – featured artist (track 10)
- Benjamin "Bless" Rinehart – featured artist (track 12)
- Lae D-Trigga – featured artist (tracks: 12, 16)
- Wallace "New Child" Lynch – featured artist (tracks: 13, 16)
- "James Gotti" Earl Floyd – featured artist (track 13)
- Bruce "Hussein Fatal" Washington – featured artist (track 13)
- Endre "Mr." Moe – featured artist (track 14)
- Killa Kaine – featured artist (track 14)
- Pete Powers – featured artist (track 14)
- Blick Street – featured artist (track 15)
- Squala Orphan – featured artist (track 15)
- Steven "Smitty" Smith – featured artist, producer & mixing (track 17)
- Steven "H Stax" Johnson – featured artist (track 18)
- Gordon "Biggest Gord" Franklin – producer (track 1)
- Chris "DJ Premier" Martin – producer (track 2)
- Angel "8-Off Agallah" Aguilar – producer (track 3)
- "DJ Yutaka" Futagawa – producer & mixing (track 4)
- Earl "E-Boogie" Thomason – producer (track 5)
- Felix "P.F. Cuttin'" Rovira – producer & mixing (track 6)
- Daniel "Alchemist" Maman – producer (tracks: 7, 14)
- Adam West – producer (track 8)
- Lamont "Ayatollah" Dorrell – producer (track 9)
- Divine – producer (track 10)
- Peter "Pete Rock" Phillips – producer (track 11)
- Patrice "Mix Master G-Flexx" Germain – producer (track 12)
- Kevin "Stoupe the Enemy of Mankind" Baldwin – producer (track 13)
- Jason "J-Love" Elias – producer (track 15)
- Vincent "DJ Spinna" Williams – producer (track 16)
- The Committee – producers (track 18)
- DJ Roach – producers (track 19)
- Taurus "Big Deal" Braxton-Harvey – recording & mixing (tracks: 1, 3, 5, 7–10, 12–16, 18, 19)
- Eddie Sancho – recording & mixing (track 2)
- Dexter Thibou – assistant recording & mixing (track 2)
- C-Murder – engineering (track 4)
- James "Jamie" Staub – recording & mixing (track 11)
- Pete Peloquin – recording (track 17)
- Trevor "Karma" Gendron – art direction
- Razi – photography
- Matt Slywka – A&R
- Lakya "Kiki" Spicer – A&R
- LaRon Batchelor – management
- Owen H. Lamb – management
- Mark Grossman – legal
- Mark Levinsohn – legal
- Randall M. Cutler – legal

== Charts ==
Chart (2001)	Peak position
US Billboard 200	122
US Top R&B/Hip-Hop Albums (Billboard)	22
US Independent Albums (Billboard)	5
US Heatseekers Albums (Billboard)	1
