= The Antidote (Ronny Jordan album) =

Studio album by Ronny Jordan
- Released: 1992
- Genre: Acid jazz, soul jazz, smooth jazz
- Length: 48:53
- Label: Island; 4th & Broadway
- Producer: Ronny Jordan, Longsy D

Ronny Jordan chronology
The Antidote (1992)	The Quiet Revolution (1993)

Singles from The Antidote
- 1. "Get To Grips" Released: 1992; 2. "So What!" Released: 1992; 3. "After Hours" Released: 1992

Professional ratings
Review scores
Source	Rating
Allmusic	4.5/5 stars

The Antidote is the debut album by English jazz guitarist Ronny Jordan, that was released by Island Records in 1992.

== Reception ==
Allmusic awarded the album 4.5 stars. The album followed the release of the Miles Davis composition So What as a single, which was popularised by London DJs and went on to become a classic of the 1990s acid jazz genre. The third single, the smooth jazz-flavoured After Hours, became Jordan's first single to reach the US R&B charts.

== Track listing ==
No.	Title	Music	Length
1.	"Get to Grips"	Grant, Jordan	5:58
2.	"Blues Grinder"	Jordan	5:26
3.	"After Hours (The Antidote)"	Jordan	5:50
4.	"See the New"	Grant, Jordan	5:26
5.	"So What"	Miles Davis	5:08
6.	"Show Me (Your Love)"	Jordan	5:34
7.	"Nite Spice"	Creed, Jordan, Rico	4:50
8.	"Summer Smile"	Jordan	5:44
9.	"Cool and Funky [US bonus track]"	Jordan	4:57

== Personnel ==
- Ronny Jordan – vocals, guitar, keyboards, synthesizer, programming
- Phillip Bent – flute
- Joe Bashorun – piano
- Adrian York – organ
- Hugo Delmirani – organ, vibraphone
- Arnie Somogyi – bass
- Longsy D – drum programming
- Isabel Roberts – vocals
- IG Culture – rap
- Recorded at PLJ Studios by Patrick Longmore

== Charts ==
Year	Single	Chart positions
Year	Single	US R&B
1992	"After Hours"	51
