= Guru's Jazzmatazz, Vol. 2: The New Reality =

Jazzmatazz, Volume II: The New Reality

Studio album by Guru
- Released: July 18, 1995
- Recorded: 1994–1995
- Studios: Main sessions: D&D (New York City); Firehouse (New York City); Additional sessions: Platinum Island (New York City); Matrix (London, UK); Echo (Los Angeles); Unique (New York City); EMI (London, UK); The Hit Factory (New York City); Brooklyn Sound (Los Angeles)
- Genres: Jazz rap; R&B
- Length: 73:53
- Label: Chrysalis
- Producers: Guru; Carlos Bess; DJ Premier; Mark Sparks; Nikke Nicole; Solsonics; True Master; Donald Byrd; Ronny Jordan

Guru chronology
Jazzmatazz, Vol. 1 (1993)	Jazzmatazz, Volume II: The New Reality (1995)	Jazzmatazz, Vol. 3: Streetsoul (2000)

Singles from Jazzmatazz Volume II (The New Reality)
- 1. "Watch What You Say" Released: 1995; 2. "Feel the Music" Released: 1995; 3. "Lifesaver" Released: 1996

Professional ratings
Review scores
Source	Rating
AllMusic	3/5 stars
The Encyclopedia of Popular Music	3/5 stars
Los Angeles Times	1/4 stars
Muzik	2.5/5 stars
(The New) Rolling Stone Album Guide	2/5 stars
The Source	3.5/5 stars
Spin	7/10

Jazzmatazz, Volume II (The New Reality) is the second solo studio album by American hip-hop musician Guru. It was released on July 18, 1995, through Chrysalis Records as the second installment of the rapper's Jazzmatazz album series.

The recording sessions took place at D&D Studios and at Firehouse Studio in New York, with additional recording at Platinum Island Studios, Unique Studios and The Hit Factory in New York, at Matrix Studios and EMI Studios in London, and at Echo Studios and Brooklyn Sound in Los Angeles. The album was produced by Guru, the Solsonics, Carlos Bess, DJ Premier, Mark Sparks, Nikke Nicole, and True Master.

It features a large number of contributors, including Big Shug, Branford Marsalis, Courtney Pine, Dee C Lee, Donald Byrd, and Ronny Jordan, who previously appeared on the first Jazzmatazz album, as well as Bahamadia, drummer Bernard Purdie, Chaka Khan, Freddie Hubbard, Ini Kamoze, Jamiroquai, Kenny Garrett, Kool Keith, Lucien Revolucien, Meshell Ndegeocello, Mica Paris, Ramsey Lewis, Reuben Wilson, and Shara Nelson.

In the United States, the album peaked at number 71 on the Billboard 200 and number 16 on the Top R&B/Hip-Hop Albums.

The album also peaked at No. 8 on the Swiss Hitparade, at No. 12 on the UK Albums Chart (also No. 2 on the UK R&B Albums Chart), at No. 19 on the Sverigetopplistan, at No. 24 on the Offizielle Top 100, at No. 25 on the Official New Zealand Albums Chart, at No. 28 on the Ö3 Austria Top 40, at No. 30 on the Dutch Album Top 100 and at No. 39 on the ARIA Albums Chart.

== Track listing ==
No.	Title	Lyrics	Music	Producer(s)	Length
1.	"Intro (Light It Up) / Jazzalude I / New Reality Style"	Keith Elam	Jez Colin	The Solsonics; Guru (co.)	1:44
2.	"Lifesaver" (featuring Baybe and Lucien)	Elam; A. Evans	Keith Elam; Carlos Bess	Guru (co.); Carlos Bess (co.)	4:13
3.	"Living in This World" (featuring Sweet Sable)	Elam; Nicole Miller		Nikke Nicole; Guru (co.)	4:29
4.	"Looking Through Darkness" (featuring Mica Paris)	Elam	Elam; Derek Harris	True Master; Guru (co.)	4:48
5.	"Skit A (Interview) / Watch What You Say" (featuring Chaka Khan)	Elam; Yvette Marie Stevens; Damian Holland	Elam; Branford Marsalis; Chris Martin	DJ Premier; Guru (co.)	4:38
6.	"Jazzalude II / Defining Purpose"	Elam	Colin; Willie McNeil	The Solsonics; Guru (co.)	1:02
7.	"For You" (featuring Me'Shell NdegéOcello)	Elam	Elam	Guru	4:10
8.	"Insert A (Mental Relaxation) / Medicine" (featuring Ini Kamoze and True Master)	Elam; Cecil Campbell; Derek Harris		Mark Sparks; Guru (co.)	4:19
9.	"Lost Souls" (featuring Jay Kay)	Elam; Jason Luís Cheetham	Elam; Jamiroquai; Bess	Carlos Bess; Guru (co.)	4:12
10.	"Insert B (The Real Deal) / Nobody Knows" (featuring Shara Nelson)	Elam	Elam; Norman Connors	Guru	3:58
11.	"Jazzalude III / Hip Hop as a Way of Life"	Elam	Colin; McNeil; Shawn Lee	The Solsonics; Guru (co.)	1:17
12.	"Respect the Architect" (featuring Bahamadia)	Elam; Antonia Reed	Elam	Guru	4:51
13.	"Feel the Music" (featuring Baybe)	Elam	Elam; Ray Hayden	Guru	3:57
14.	"Young Ladies" (featuring Kool Keith, Big Shug and Patra)	Elam; Keith Thornton; Cary Guy; Patra	Elam	Guru	4:12
15.	"The Traveler"	Elam; Donald Byrd	Elam; Donald Byrd	Guru; Donald Byrd (add.)	4:01
16.	"Jazzalude IV / Maintaining Focus"	Elam	Colin	The Solsonics; Guru (co.)	1:18
17.	"Count Your Blessings"	Elam	Elam	Guru	4:03
18.	"Choice of Weapons" (featuring Gus Da Vigilante and Dee C Lee)	Elam; Deron Johnson		Guru	4:24
19.	"Something in the Past"	Elam	Elam	Guru	3:19
20.	"Skit B (Alot on My Mind) / Revelation" (featuring Bu)	Elam; Steven Johnson	Elam; Ronny Jordan	Guru; Ronny Jordan (co.)	4:35
Total length:					73:53

== Personnel ==
- Keith "GuRu" Elam — vocals, arrangement, producer (tracks: 7, 10, 12–15, 17–20), co-producer (tracks: 1–6, 8, 9, 11, 16), mixing, executive producer

Vocalists

- Kevin Williams — additional vocals (tracks: 1, 6, 11, 16)
- A. "Baybe" Evans — vocals (tracks: 2, 13)
- Lucien "Papalu" M'Baidem — vocals (track 2)
- Ceybil "Sweet Sable" Jefferies — vocals (track 3)
- Michelle "Mica Paris" Wallen — vocals (track 4)
- Yvette "Chaka Khan" Stevens — vocals (track 5)
- Me'Shell NdegéOcello — vocals (track 7)
- Cecil "Ini Kamoze" Campbell — vocals (track 8)
- Derek "True Master" Harris — vocals (track 8)
- Jason "Jay Kay" Cheetham — vocals (track 9)
- Shara Nelson — vocals (track 10)
- Antonia "Bahamadia" Reed — vocals (track 12)
- Cary "Big Shug" Guy — vocals (track 14)
- Keith "Kool Keith" Thornton — vocals (track 14)
- Patra — vocals (track 14)
- Deron "Gus Da Vigilante" Johnson — vocals (track 18)
- Diane "Dee C Lee" Sealy — vocals (track 18)
- Andre "Panchi Da Wild Comanchi" Davis — additional vocals (track 18)
- Steven "Bu"/"Hannibal Stax" Johnson — vocals (track 20)

Musicians

- Marc Antoine — guitar (tracks: 1, 6, 11, 16)
- Mike Bolto — Rhodes electric piano (tracks: 1, 6, 11, 16)
- Jez Colin — bass (tracks: 1, 6, 11, 16)
- Willie McNeil — drums (tracks: 1, 6, 11, 16)
- Shawn Lee — drums (tracks: 1, 6, 11, 16)
- Derrick Davis — alto saxophone & flute (tracks: 1, 6, 11, 16)
- Jay Rodriguez — clarinet & flute (track 3)
- Branford Marsalis — saxophone (track 5)
- Meshell Ndegeocello — bass (track 7)
- Kenny Garrett — saxophone (track 7), Rhodes electric piano (track 14)
- Donald Byrd — trumpet (tracks: 8, 15)
- Juan "DJ Redhanded" Cordova — scratches (track 8)
- Stuart Zender — bass (track 9)
- Wallace Collins — didgeridoo (track 9)
- Darren "DJ D-Zire" Galea — scratches (track 9)
- Jan Kincaid — piano (track 10)
- Ramsey Lewis — Moog synthesizer & piano (track 12)
- Brian Holt — bass (tracks: 12, 14), guitar & keyboards (track 17)
- George "DJ Scratch" Spivey — scratches (track 12)
- Paul "Sequence" Ferguson — piano & keyboards (track 13)
- Reuben Wilson — organ (track 14)
- Sean "DJ Sean-Ski" Harris — scratches (track 14)
- Bernard Purdie — drums (track 17)
- Dennis Mitchell — keyboards (track 18)
- Courtney Pine — saxophone & flute (track 18)
- Freddie Hubbard — trumpet (track 19)
- Robert "Ronny Jordan" Simpson — guitar (track 20)

Production

- The Solsonics — producers (tracks: 1, 6, 11, 16)
- "Nikke" Nicole Miller — producer (track 3)
- True Master — producer (track 4)
- Chris "DJ Premier" Martin — producer (track 5)
- Mark Sparks — producer (track 8)
- Carlos Bess — producer (track 9), co-producer (track 2)
- Donald Byrd — additional producer (track 15)
- Ronny Jordan — co-producer (track 20)
- Neale Easterby — executive producer
- Patrick Moxey — executive producer

Technicals

- Steve Gursky — engineering (tracks: 1, 6, 11, 16)
- Carlos Bess — engineering (tracks: 2, 13, 17), mixing (track 9)
- Joe Quinde — engineering (tracks: 3, 12)
- Ben Jones — engineering (tracks: 4, 5, 9)
- Eddie Sancho — engineering (tracks: 4, 7, 13, 18, 20), mixing (track 10)
- Michael Chukes — engineering (tracks: 5, 7)
- Ken "Duro" Ifill — engineering (track 7)
- Robert Caprio — engineering (tracks: 8, 19)
- Jason Ball — engineering (tracks: 10, 18)
- Leo "Swift" Morris — engineering (tracks: 14, 15)
- Yoram Vazan — engineering (track 17)
- William "Bill-Dog" Dooley — engineering (track 19)
- Kieran Walsh — engineering
- Tony Dawsey — mastering
- Jose "Choco" Reynoso — creative input (track 2)
- Gordon Franklin — creative input (track 15)
- Panchi Da Wild Comanchi — creative input (track 18)
- Mike Rone — creative input (track 20)
- Thierry Le Goues — photography
- Henry Marquez — art direction
- Duff Marlowe — A&R

== Charts ==
Chart (1995)	Peak position
Australian Albums (ARIA)	39
Austrian Albums (Ö3 Austria)	28
Dutch Albums (Album Top 100)	30
German Albums (Offizielle Top 100)	24
New Zealand Albums (RMNZ)	25
Swedish Albums (Sverigetopplistan)	19
Swiss Albums (Schweizer Hitparade)	8
UK Albums (Official Charts)	12
UK R&B Albums (Official Charts)	2
US Billboard 200	71
US Top R&B/Hip-Hop Albums (Billboard)	16
