= MiLight =

Studio album by DJ Krush
- Released: November 1, 1996 (Japan); August 18, 1997 (Overseas)
- Genres: Hip-hop, trip hop
- Length: 73:34
- Labels: FFRR Records, Mo' Wax
- Producer: DJ Krush

DJ Krush chronology
Ki-Oku (1996)	MiLight (1996)	Holonic-The Self Megamix (1997)

Alternate cover
- Japanese edition album cover

MiLight (未来, Mirai) is the fourth solo studio album by Japanese hip-hop producer DJ Krush. It was released in 1996. It peaked at number 100 on the UK Albums Chart.

== Critical reception ==
Professional ratings
Review scores
Source	Rating
AllMusic	4/5 stars
NME	5/10

Ned Raggett of AllMusic gave the album 4 stars out of 5, calling it "a fairly good effort, as always with Krush's brand of jazz-tinged, heavy, druggy breakbeats and scratches at the center of things."

== Track listing ==
No.	Title	Length
1.	"Intro"	1:29
2.	"From Rino"	0:29
3.	"Shin-Sekai" (featuring Rino)	3:25
4.	"Jikan no Hashi 1"	0:54
5.	"From Stash"	0:32
6.	"Real" (featuring Tragedy)	4:27
7.	"From Tragedy"	0:36
8.	"Jugoya"	4:31
9.	"Listen" (featuring Shawn J. Period)	7:05
10.	"From Shawn J. Period"	0:44
11.	"Supanova" (featuring Finsta Bundy)	4:30
12.	"From Finsta Bundy"	0:27
13.	"Jikan no Hashi 2"	2:14
14.	"From DJ Cam"	0:43
15.	"Le Temps" (featuring DJ Cam)	9:36
16.	"From Kemuri Production"	1:56
17.	"Hitotsu no Mirai" (featuring Kemuri Production)	6:02
18.	"From Futura 2000"	0:30
19.	"From DJ Krush"	0:51
20.	"Jikan no Hashi 3"	0:08
21.	"From Lee Q"	0:33
22.	"From Mos Def"	0:37
23.	"Shinjiro" (featuring Mos Def)	4:18
24.	"From Ken 'Duro' Ifill"	0:21
25.	"Light (Can You See It?)" (featuring Ken 'Duro' Ifill)	4:42
26.	"Mind Games" (featuring Eri Ohno)	5:00
27.	"From Eri Ohno"	1:06
28.	"Skin Against Skin" (featuring Deborah Anderson)	5:48

== Charts ==
Chart	Peak position
UK Albums (OCC)	100
