= Holonic-The Self Megamix =

Mixtape by DJ Krush
- Released: September 1, 1997
- Genres: Hip-hop, trip hop
- Length: 51:59
- Labels: Sony Music Entertainment Japan, Mo' Wax
- Producer: DJ Krush

DJ Krush chronology
MiLight (1996)	Holonic-The Self Megamix (1997)	Kakusei (1998)

Holonic-The Self Megamix is a 1997 mixtape by Japanese hip-hop producer DJ Krush. It peaked at number 24 on the UK Independent Albums Chart.

== Critical reception ==
Professional ratings
Review scores
Source	Rating
AllMusic	4/5 stars

Stewart Mason of AllMusic gave the album 4 stars out of 5, calling it "an excellent introduction to DJ Krush's work."

== Track listing ==
No.	Title	Length
1.	"Forward"	0:45
2.	"Anticipation"	2:22
3.	"Yeah"	1:24
4.	"What's Behind Darkness"	2:44
5.	"Freestyle 1"	0:27
6.	"To Be Continued"	4:18
7.	"Fucked-Up Pendulum"	1:26
8.	"Freestyle 2"	0:40
9.	"AM3:00TYO"	3:06
10.	"Duality"	5:03
11.	"Light (Can You See It?)"	3:18
12.	"Dig This Vibe"	4:14
13.	"Le Temps"	3:28
14.	"Only the Strong Survive"	2:10
15.	"Real"	4:34
16.	"Shin-Sekai"	0:48
17.	"Kemuri"	4:34
18.	"Bypath: Would You Take It?"	0:48
19.	"Skin Against Skin" (Japanese edition bonus track)	5:50

== Charts ==
Chart	Peak position
UK Independent Albums (OCC)	24
