= Evig Poesi, Conurbia, Definite =

Norwefian hip-hop artist trio

Evig Poesi, Conurbia, Definite is a collaborative trio consisting of Norwegian hip-hop artists Evig Poesi, Conurbia and Definite. In 2011, they released their debut, the eight track long "Verdens ende" with Bonsaiety Records. "Verdens ende" featured production by Smart 9000 and André Jensen from Evig Poesi, Definite, Aaonli & Ionious from Conurbia and HandyCat.
