= Strictly Turntablized =

Studio album by DJ Krush
- Released: November 21, 1994
- Studio: The Beat Farm (London)
- Genre: Trip hop
- Length: 38:06
- Label: Mo' Wax
- Producer: DJ Krush

DJ Krush chronology
Krush (1994)	Strictly Turntablized (1994)	Meiso (1995)

Singles from Strictly Turntablized
- 1. "Lost and Found (S.F.L.)" / "Kemuri" Released: September 12, 1994; 2. "Yeah" / "Dig This Vibe" Released: July 10, 1995

Strictly Turntablized is the second studio album by Japanese hip-hop producer DJ Krush, released on November 21, 1994 by Mo' Wax. In Japan, the album was released by the Avex Trax subsidiary label Jazz Not Jazz Records on April 21, 1995, and was subsequently reissued by Sony Music Entertainment on September 9, 1998.

== Critical reception ==
Professional ratings
Review scores
Source	Rating
AllMusic	4/5 stars
NME	7/10

"The tubercular atmospheres and wheezing bass of the record's best tracks", wrote Peter Shapiro in Drum 'n' Bass: The Rough Guide (1999), "showed that the Down Tempo beat crew was capable of evoking something other than their own ganja-soaked hipness." In 2015, writer Daisuke Kawasaki ranked Strictly Turntablized at number 38 on his list of the "100 Greatest Rock Albums of All Time".

== Track listing ==
All tracks are written by DJ Krush, except where noted.

No.	Title	Length
1.	"Intro"	1:04
2.	"Lunation"	3:34
3.	"Fucked-Up Pendulum"	4:26
4.	"Kemuri"	4:42
5.	"The Loop"	1:53
6.	"Silent Ungah (Too Much Pain)"	4:23
7.	"Interlude"	1:11
8.	"Dig This Vibe"	4:54
9.	"Yeah"	3:22
10.	"To the Infinity"	4:09
11.	"The Nightmare of Ungah (Sandro in Effect)"	4:28
Total length:		38:06

1995 Japanese edition bonus tracks
No.	Title	Lyrics	Music	Length
12.	"Don't You Miss (Feel)"	Carla Vallet	DJ Krush; Edison	4:48
13.	"To Be Continued"			5:38
14.	"Exit to Entrance"			4:11
Total length:				52:43

== Personnel ==
Credits are adapted from the album's liner notes.

Musicians

- DJ Krush – beats, scratching
- Noah – vocals on "The Nightmare of Ungah (Sandro in Effect)"
- Stash – vocals on "Intro" and "The Nightmare of Ungah (Sandro in Effect)"

Production

- DJ Krush – production
- Noriko Asano – executive production
- Chris Bemand – recording, engineering
- Fraser Cooke – assistance
- Tim Goldsworthy – assistance
- Tracey Myerscough – assistance

Design

- Ben Drury – logo design
- Futura 2000 – cover artwork
- Swifty – sleeve design

== Charts ==
Chart (1994)	Peak position
UK Dance Albums (OCC)	4
UK Independent Albums (OCC)	7
