= Guru's Jazzmatazz, Vol. 3: Streetsoul =

Guru's Jazzmatazz Streetsoul

Studio album by Guru
- Released: October 3, 2000
- Recorded: 1999–2000
- Genre: Hip-hop; jazz rap
- Length: 62:13
- Label: Virgin
- Producer: Agallah; DJ Scratch; Erykah Badu; DJ Premier; Jay Dee; the Neptunes; the Roots; Victor Flowers

Guru chronology
Jazzmatazz, Vol. 2: The New Reality (1995)	Guru's Jazzmatazz Streetsoul (2000)	Baldhead Slick & da Click (2001)

Professional ratings
Review scores
Source	Rating
AllMusic	2.5/5 stars
Entertainment Weekly	B
laut.de	3/5 stars
The New Zealand Herald	4/5 stars
Now	2/5
RapReviews	9.5/10
The New Rolling Stone Album Guide	2/5 stars
Spin	8/10

Guru's Jazzmatazz: Streetsoul is the third solo studio album by American hip-hop musician Guru. It was released on October 3, 2000, via Virgin Records as the third installment of Guru's Jazzmatazz album series. This also marks his only solo studio album for a major record label. The album was produced by Gang Starr, the Neptunes, Agallah, DJ Scratch, Erykah Badu, J Dilla, the Roots, and Victor Flower.

== Synopsis ==
As the title seems to suggest, this volume featured a blend of soul with R&B. The decline in jazz inflections that made Jazzmatazz, Vol. 1 popular continued on this release (the decline was already noticeable on Jazzmatazz, Vol. 2: The New Reality). Streetsoul outperformed previous entries significantly; it peaked at Nos. 32 and 8 on the Billboard 200 and Top R&B/Hip-Hop Albums charts, respectively.

As with previous releases, a host of guest performers were featured on this recording. Most of the artists are stalwarts of the neo soul and R&B scene. First-time appearances in the series were made by several contemporary acts, including Amel Larrieux, Angie Stone, Bilal, Craig David, Donell Jones, Erykah Badu, and the Roots. The returning musicians included Herbie Hancock and Isaac Hayes.

== Track listing ==
No.	Title	Writer(s)	Producer(s)	Length
1.	"Intro"	Keith Edward Elam	Guru	1:05
2.	"Keep Your Worries" (featuring Angie Stone)	Elam; Angie Stone; George Spivey	DJ Scratch	4:58
3.	"Hustlin' Daze" (featuring Donell Jones)	Elam; Donell Jones; Chris Martin; Bruce Mayfield; Collin Dewar; Corey Woods; Delmar Coward; Donnell Jones; Jamel Cummings; Jeffrey Atkins; John Hill; Michael Dewar; Robert Diggs; Thaddaeus Birkett	DJ Premier	4:46
4.	"All I Said" (featuring Macy Gray)	Elam; Natalie Hinds; Chad Hugo; Pharrell Williams	The Neptunes	4:07
5.	"Certified" (featuring Bilal)	Elam; Bilal Sayeed Oliver; James Yancey; Lynsey de Paul; Barry Green	Jay Dee	4:40
6.	"Plenty" (featuring Erykah Badu)	Elam; Erykah Badu	Erykah Badu	4:38
7.	"Lift Your Fist" (featuring The Roots)	Elam; Tariq Trotter; Ahmir Thompson; James Poyser	The Roots	3:48
8.	"Guidance" (featuring Amel Larrieux)	Elam; Amel Larrieux; Laru Larrieux; Maurice White	Guru	4:06
9.	"Interlude" (Brooklyn Skit)	Elam	Guru	0:51
10.	"Supa Love" (featuring Kelis)	Elam; Hugo; Williams	The Neptunes	3:52
11.	"No More" (featuring Craig David)	Elam; Craig David	Guru	4:03
12.	"Where's My Ladies?" (featuring Big Shug)	Elam; Cary Guy; Martin	Gang Starr	4:07
13.	"Night Vision" (featuring Isaac Hayes)	Elam; Isaac Hayes; Victor Flowers	Guru; Victor Flowers	3:33
14.	"Who's There?" (featuring Les Nubians)	Elam; Célia Faussart; Hélène Faussart	Guru	4:05
15.	"Mashin' Up da World" (featuring Prodigal Sunn and Junior Reid)	Elam; Vergil Ruff; Delroy Reid; Angel Aguilar	Guru; Agallah	5:20
16.	"Timeless" (featuring Herbie Hancock)	Elam; Herbie Hancock	Guru	4:14
Total length:				1:02:13

Sample credits

- Track 3 contains a sample of "Here I Am" as performed by the Blue Notes and "It's Not a Game" performed by American Cream Team
- Track 5 contains a sample of "Sugar Me" as performed by Klaus Wunderlich
- Track 8 contains a sample of "Keep Your Head to the Sky" as performed by Earth, Wind & Fire
- Track 13 contains a sample of "Walk from Regios" performed by Isaac Hayes
- Track 14 contains a sample of "Love Without Sex" performed by Gwen McCrae

== Personnel ==
- ?uestlove — drummer, producer
- Erykah Badu — vocals, producer
- Kevin Bergen — engineer, mixing assistant
- Big Shug — performer
- Black Thought — vocals
- Drew Coleman — engineer
- DJ Premier — producer
- Tom Coyne — mastering
- Craig David — vocals
- Ryan Dorn — keyboards, vocals
- Todd Fairall — engineer
- Tameka Foster — stylist
- Macy Gray — vocals
- Guru — vocals
- Herbie Hancock — performer
- Isaac Hayes — vocals
- Donell Jones — vocals
- Caleb Lambert — engineer
- Amel Larrieux — performer
- Amy Linden — liner notes
- Shaun Martin — keyboards
- Bill McMullen — art direction, design
- Mark Mitchell — engineer
- Les Nubians — performer
- James Poyser — producer
- Junior Reid — vocals
- Eddie Sancho — engineer, mixing
- Jon Smeltz — engineer, mixing
- Ryan Smith — engineer
- Tom Soares — mixing
- Angie Stone — vocals
- Dexter Thibou — engineer, mixing, mixing assistant
- Pharrell Williams — producer, multi instruments
- Chad Hugo — producer, multi instruments
- J Dilla — producer
- Patrick Moxey — executive producer
- Aaron Seawood — executive producer

== Charts ==
Chart (2000)	Peak position
Austrian Albums (Ö3 Austria)	32
Belgian Albums (Ultratop Flanders)	22
Dutch Albums (Album Top 100)	33
French Albums (SNEP)	42
German Albums (Offizielle Top 100)	26
Italian Albums (FIMI)	36
New Zealand Albums (RMNZ)	18
Norwegian Albums (VG-lista)	13
Swedish Albums (Sverigetopplistan)	26
Swiss Albums (Schweizer Hitparade)	29
US Billboard 200	32
US Top R&B/Hip-Hop Albums (Billboard)	8
