= The Message at the Depth =

Studio album by DJ Krush
- Released: 4 September 2002
- Genres: Hip-hop, trip hop, electronic
- Length: 59:49
- Labels: Columbia, RED Ink Records
- Producers: DJ Krush, Jel, Sly and Robbie

DJ Krush chronology
Zen (2001)	The Message at the Depth (2002)	Jaku (2004)

The Message at the Depth is the seventh solo studio album by Japanese hip-hop producer DJ Krush. It was released in Japan on 4 September 2002, and overseas on 11 February 2003. It peaked at number 23 on the Billboard Top Dance/Electronic Albums chart.

== Critical reception ==
Professional ratings
Review scores
Source	Rating
All About Jazz	favorable
AllMusic	4/5 stars
Pitchfork	4.2/10
PopMatters	favorable
XLR8R	favorable

Tamara Palmer of XLR8R wrote: "With beats and melodies that outline the caliber of a classical composer, Krush rocks the international flavor that's he's honed on previous efforts with a true global hip-hop hybrid."

== Track listing ==
No.	Title	Length
1.	"Trihedron" (featuring The Opus)	6:30
2.	"Toki no Tabiji (Journey of Time)" (featuring Inden)	6:18
3.	"Sanity Requiem"	4:20
4.	"Supreme Team" (featuring Antipop Consortium)	3:49
5.	"The Blackhole"	9:19
6.	"Song for John Walker" (featuring Anticon)	5:35
7.	"D'You Hear That"	0:59
8.	"Aletheuo (Truthspeaking)" (featuring Angelina Esparza)	5:12
9.	"The Lost Voices" (featuring Sly and Robbie)	5:08
10.	"But the World Moves On" (featuring D-Madness and Masato Nakamura)	6:32
11.	"What About Tomorrow" (featuring Abijah)	6:07

== Charts ==
Chart	Peak position
French Albums (SNEP)	101
US Top Dance/Electronic Albums (Billboard)	23
