= Meiso =

Studio album by DJ Krush
- Released: July 21, 1995
- Studios: Show-On (Tokyo); Platinum Island (New York, New York)
- Genres: Trip hop; hip-hop
- Length: 48:53
- Label: Sony
- Producer: DJ Krush

DJ Krush chronology
Strictly Turntablized (1994)	Meiso (1995)	Ki-Oku (1996)

Singles from Meiso
- 1. "Meiso" Released: 1996; 2. "Only the Strong Survive" Released: September 30, 1996

Meiso (迷走, Meisō) is the third studio album by Japanese hip-hop producer DJ Krush. It was released on July 21, 1995 in Japan by Sony Music Entertainment.

Meiso was issued in the United Kingdom on October 30, 1995 by the label Mo' Wax, peaking at number 64 on the UK Albums Chart. It was released in the United States on April 9, 1996 by Mo' Wax and FFRR Records. The album produced the singles "Meiso" and "Only the Strong Survive", which reached numbers 52 and 71 respectively on the UK Singles Chart.

== Composition ==
Fact described Meiso as an album of sample-based trip hop music. AllMusic critic Ned Raggett said that the music continued in the vein of DJ Krush's past work, incorporating "mid- to slow-tempo grooves and breaks" and exploring "everything from jazz and funk to experimental ambient production." The album features guest performances from several American rappers: CL Smooth on "Only the Strong Survive", Roots members Black Thought and Malik B. on "Meiso", Deflon Sallahr on "Ground", and Guru and Big Shug on "Most Wanted Man". "Make no mistake", Muzik's Will Ashon wrote of Meiso, "this is a hip-hop album".

== Critical reception ==
Professional ratings
Review scores
Source	Rating
AllMusic	4/5 stars
The Guardian	4/5 stars
Muzik	4.5/5
The Source	3.5/5 stars

Dan Glaister of The Guardian found Meiso more accessible than DJ Krush's previous releases, attributing this partly to the more prominent rapping on the album. Glaister praised the record as an effective "blend of the upbeat with contemplative and downright mysterious instrumentals". Writing for Trouser Press, Mark Kemp said that it pointed toward "further fascinating intercultural exploration of the space between foursquare hip-hop and floating ambient techno." In 2015, Fact ranked Meiso at number 12 on its list of the best trip hop albums of all time.

== Track listing ==
All music is composed by DJ Krush, except where noted.

No.	Title	Lyrics	Music	Length
1.	"Only the Strong Survive" (with CL Smooth)	Smooth		4:14
2.	"Anticipation"			4:44
3.	"What's Behind Darkness"			3:05
4.	"Meiso" (with Black Thought and Malik B.)	Black Thought; Malik B.		4:02
5.	"Bypath 1"			0:37
6.	"Blank"			2:19
7.	"Ground" (with Deflon Sallahr)	Sallahr		5:57
8.	"Bypath 2"			0:45
9.	"Most Wanted Man" (with Guru and Big Shug)	Big Shug	DJ Krush; Guru	4:00
10.	"Bypath 3"			1:13
11.	"3rd Eye"			4:46
12.	"Oce 9504"			3:35
13.	"Duality" (with DJ Shadow)		DJ Krush; DJ Shadow	8:48
14.	"Bypath – Would You Take It?"			0:48
Total length:				48:53

== Personnel ==
Credits are adapted from the album's liner notes.

Musicians

- DJ Krush – beats, scratching, drum programming on "Duality", abstract programming on "Bypath – Would You Take It?"
- Big Shug – vocals on "Most Wanted Man"
- Black Thought – vocals on "Meiso"
- DJ Hide – scratching on "Anticipation"
- DJ Shadow – beats, scratching, and drum programming on "Duality"
- Guru – vocals on "Most Wanted Man"
- Malik B. – vocals on "Meiso"
- Deflon Sallahr – vocals on "Ground"
- CL Smooth – vocals on "Only the Strong Survive"

Production

- DJ Krush – production, mixing
- Noriko Asano – executive production
- Toshiya Horiuchi – mastering
- Ken Duro Ifill – recording
- Tetsuo Kato – executive production
- Koichi "Oppenheimer" Matsuki – recording
- Yoko Yamanaka – recording (assistant)

Design

- Mami Ikeda – translation
- Sachiko Kishi – translation
- Masato Nakamura – photography
- Sakaguchi Ken Factory – art direction, design

== Charts ==
Chart (1995)	Peak position
UK Albums (Official Charts)	64
UK Dance Albums (OCC)	4
UK Independent Albums (OCC)	7
UK R&B Albums (Official Charts)	8
