= Zen (DJ Krush album) =

Studio album by DJ Krush
- Released: 24 January 2001
- Genres: Hip-hop, trip hop, downtempo, electronic
- Length: 63:40
- Labels: Sony Music Entertainment Japan, RED Ink Records
- Producer: DJ Krush

DJ Krush chronology
Kakusei (1998)	Zen (2001)	The Message at the Depth (2002)

Zen (漸, Zen) is the sixth solo studio album by Japanese hip-hop producer DJ Krush. It was released in Japan on 24 January 2001, and overseas on 7 August 2001. It peaked at number 66 on the Oricon Albums Chart.

The album title means "gradually" in English. This word is a homophone of the word for the Zen Buddhist tradition (written "禅" in Japanese, not "漸").

== Critical reception ==
Professional ratings
Review scores
Source	Rating
AllMusic	4/5 stars
Billboard	favorable
Creative Loafing	mixed

John Bush of AllMusic gave the album 4 stars out of 5, saying, "DJ Krush works his way into a vision of sublime, downbeat hip-hop that's a snug fit with the title." Rashaun Hall of Billboard said, "Zen finds DJ Krush a true master of emotion".

At the 2002 AFIM Indie Awards, it won the award for Dance Album.

== Track listing ==
No.	Title	Length
1.	"Song 1"	5:18
2.	"Zen Approach" (featuring Black Thought)	4:15
3.	"Danger of Love" (featuring Zap Mama)	5:38
4.	"Sonic Traveler" (featuring Tunde Ayanyemi)	5:59
5.	"Duck Chase" (featuring Phonosycographdisk)	4:26
6.	"Vision of Art" (featuring Company Flow)	4:10
7.	"Day's End" (featuring Kazufumi Kodama)	4:45
8.	"With Grace" (featuring N'Dea Davenport)	6:12
9.	"Candle Chant (A Tribute)" (featuring Boss the MC)	6:26
10.	"Endless Railway" (featuring Ahmir "?uestlove" Thompson)	6:32
11.	"Whut'z da Solution" (featuring Kukoo Da Baga Bonez)	4:23
12.	"Paradise Bird Theory" (featuring Sunja Lee)	5:36

== Charts ==
Chart	Peak position
French Albums (SNEP)	136
Japanese Albums (Oricon)	66
