= The Best of Guru's Jazzmatazz =

Greatest hits album by Guru
- Released: February 12, 2008
- Genre: Hip hop; jazz rap
- Label: Virgin; EMI
- Producer: Guru; Various (See individual Jazzmatazz albums)

Guru chronology
Guru's Jazzmatazz: The Timebomb Back to the Future Mixtape (2007)	The Best of Guru's Jazzmatazz (2008)	Guru 8.0: Lost and Found (2009)

The Best of Guru's Jazzmatazz is a greatest hits album released by Guru on Virgin Records. This compilation includes tracks from the first three volumes of the Jazzmatazz series, as well as remixes and alternate versions. Tracks 1–6 & 17 (1993), Tracks 7–11 & 18 (1995), & Tracks 12–16 (2000).

== Reception ==
Record Collector noted about the album, "With bonus remix material included, this is a studied and respectful fusion of styles."

== Track listing ==
1. "No Time To Play" (Featuring Ronny Jordan & D.C. Lee) (4:54)
2. "Trust Me" (Featuring N'Dea Davenport) (4:27)
3. "Slicker Than Most" (Featuring Gary Barnacle) (2:35)
4. "Down The Backstreets" (Featuring Lonnie Liston Smith) (4:47)
5. "Sights In The City" (Featuring Carleen Anderson & Courtney Pine) (5:09)
6. "Loungin'" (Featuring Donald Byrd) (4:38)
7. "Respect The Architect" (Featuring Ramsey Lewis, Bahamadia, Brian Holt & DJ Scratch) (4:50)
8. "Watch What You Say" (Featuring Chaka Khan & Branford Marsalis) (4:37)
9. "Lost Souls" (Featuring Jason Kay, Stuart Zender, Wallace Collins & Darren Galea) (4:11)
10. "Choice Of Weapons" (Featuring Dee C. Lee, Gus Da Vigilante, Courtney Pine & Dennis Mitchell) (4:24)
11. "Looking Through Darkness" (Featuring Mica Paris) (4:47)
12. "Keep Your Worries (Street Version)" (Featuring Angie Stone) (4:57)
13. "Supa Love" (Featuring Kelis) (3:51)
14. "Lift Your Fist" (Featuring The Roots) (3:47)
15. "Plenty" (Featuring Erykah Badu) (4:33)
16. "Choices" (Featuring N'dea Davenport & Bobbi Humphrey) (3:46) [Japanese edition bonus track]
17. "Loungin' (Jazz Not Jazz Mix)" (Featuring Donald Byrd) (3:50) [Japanese edition bonus track]
18. "Respect The Architect (Buckwild Remix)" (Featuring Ramsey Lewis, Bahamadia & DJ Scratch) (4:13) [Japanese edition bonus track]
