= Antidote Shanghai =

Chinese musical group

Antidote Shanghai is a group of Chinese music producers and DJs that host several monthly events in Shanghai, and in other cities around Greater China.

== Origins ==
Antidote Shanghai began in 2005 at a party in a small Shanghai bar called C's club. The event turned into a monthly phenomenon and moved on to larger venues such as the Shelter Club and features independent Chinese music producers. Most notable among them are Shanshui Records, founder of Sulumi, Antidote co-founder B6, and other foreign guests. Antidote events have gained a reputation for bold, eclectic music selections, culture jamming antics, cryptic dress codes, and often live electronic music.

== 2007 incident ==
In July 2007, the group staged a mock coup d'état, running into an exclusive member's only night club (Volar Shanghai) and removed the resident DJ by force. Group members have also participated in a number of regional music festivals like Modern Sky Festival, Midi Modern Music Festival, and Summer Clash, Taiwan.

== Antidote advertising ==
B6's poster designs for the Antidote have drawn both critical acclaim and controversy, and have been exhibited in galleries in China and London's Victoria and Albert Museum. In August 2008, BBC's The Culture Show did a feature show on the Antidote and B6.
