= Guru's Jazzmatazz, Vol. 4: The Hip Hop Jazz Messenger: Back to the Future =

Studio album by Guru
- Released: July 31, 2007
- Recorded: 2006–2007
- Genre: Jazz rap
- Length: 56:25
- Label: 7 Grand
- Producer: Guru (exec.); Solar (also exec.)

Guru chronology
Version 7.0: The Street Scriptures (2005)	Guru's Jazzmatazz, Vol. 4: The Hip Hop Jazz Messenger: Back to the Future (2007)	Guru's Jazzmatazz: The Timebomb Back to the Future Mixtape (2007)

Singles from Guru's Jazzmatazz, Vol. 4: The Hip Hop Jazz Messenger: Back to the Future
- 1. "State of Clarity" Released: August 2007

Professional ratings
Review scores
Source	Rating
AllMusic	3.5/5 stars
HipHopDX	3/5
RapReviews	9/10
The Skinny	3/5 stars
XXL	L (3/5)

Guru's Jazzmatazz, Vol. 4: The Hip Hop Jazz Messenger: Back to the Future is the sixth solo studio album by American hip hop musician Guru. It was released on July 31, 2007 via 7 Grand Records, making it the fourth and final installment in the rapper's Jazzmatazz series. Production was handled entirely by Solar, who also served as executive producer together with Guru. It features guest appearances from Blackalicious, Bobby Valentino, Bob James, Caron Wheeler, Common, Damian Marley, David Sanborn, Dionne Farris, Kem, Brownman Ali, Omar, Raheem DeVaughn, Ronnie Laws, Shelley Harland and Vivian Green.

A video for the song "State of Clarity" includes clips from the movie Fritz the Cat.

== Track listing ==
No.	Title	Writer(s)	Length
1.	"Cuz I'm Jazzy" (featuring Slum Village)	Keith Elam; R.L. Altman; John Mosher
2.	"State of Clarity" (featuring Common and Bob James)	Keith Elam; Lonnie Lynn; Robert James; John Mosher
3.	"Stand up (Some Thing'll Never Change)" (featuring Damian "Jr. Gong" Marley)	Keith Elam; Damian Marley; John Mosher
4.	"Look to the Sun"	Keith Elam; John Mosher
5.	"Connection" (featuring Kem)	Keith Elam; Kim Owens; John Mosher
6.	"Fine and Free" (featuring Vivian Green)	Keith Elam; Vivian Green; John Mosher
7.	"Wait on Me" (featuring Raheem DeVaughn)	Keith Elam; Raheem DeVaughn; John Mosher
8.	"International" (featuring Bobby Valentino)	Keith Elam; Bobby Wilson; John Mosher
9.	"This Is Art" (featuring Ronnie Laws)	Keith Elam; John Mosher
10.	"Fly Magnetic" (featuring Dionne Farris)	Elam; Dionne Farris; John Mosher
11.	"The Jazz Style" (featuring Omar)	Keith Elam; Omar Lye-Fook; John Mosher
12.	"Follow the Signs" (featuring Shelley Harland)	Keith Elam; Shelley Harland; John Mosher
13.	"Universal Struggle" (featuring Brownman)	Keith Elam; Brownman Ali; John Mosher
14.	"Infinite" (featuring Blackalicious)	Keith Elam; Timothy Parker; John Mosher
15.	"Kissed the World" (featuring Caron Wheeler)	Keith Elam; Caron Wheeler; John Mosher
16.	"Living Legend" (featuring David Sanborn)	Keith Elam; John Mosher
Total length:			56:25

Australian edition bonus track
No.	Title	Writer(s)	Length
17.	"State of Clarity (Remix)" (featuring Common and Bob James)	Keith Elam; Lonnie Lynn; Robert James; John Mosher

== Charts ==
Chart (2007)	Peak position
Belgian Albums (Ultratop Flanders)	90
French Albums (SNEP)	155
Swiss Albums (Schweizer Hitparade)	55
US Top R&B/Hip-Hop Albums (Billboard)	45
US Independent Albums (Billboard)	20
UK R&B Albums (OCC)	20
