= Guru's Jazzmatazz: The Timebomb Back to the Future Mixtape =

The Timebomb: Back To The Future Mixtape

Mixtape by Guru
- Released: July 31, 2007
- Genre: Hip hop
- Label: 7 Grand
- Producer: Guru; Solar; DJ Doo Wop

Guru chronology
Jazzmatazz, Vol. 4: The Hip-Hop Jazz Messenger: Back to the Future (2007)	The Timebomb: Back To The Future Mixtape (2007)	The Best of Guru's Jazzmatazz (2008)

Alternative Covers
- Original Promo Cover

Alternative cover
- Import Cover

The Timebomb: Back To The Future Mixtape (also known as Guru's Jazzmatazz – The Mixtape Back To The Future, Jazzmatazz Back To The Future Mix Tape, Guru's Jazzmatazz: The Mixtape and other variations) is a commercial mixtape album released by Guru through 7 Grand Records, hosted by DJ Doo Wop and produced by Solar. Released soon after Jazzmatazz, Vol. 4: The Hip-Hop Jazz Messenger: Back to the Future, its press release describes it as "Guru's "raw" companion to the Jazzmatazz Vol. 4 album."

== Track listing ==
1. "Intro (Don Gurizzy)" (2:03)
2. "Knowledge" (Featuring Lord Tariq) (1:56)
3. "7 Grand Ya'll" (Featuring Solar) (3:17)
4. "For Ya Mind" (Featuring Zion I) (2:20)
5. "Peace!" (Featuring K-Born, Highpower & Solar) (3:24)
6. "State of Clarity (Solar Remix)" (Featuring Common) (3:04)
7. "Who Got It On Lock?" (Featuring DJ Doo Wop) (2:21)
8. "B-Boy Kamikaze" (Featuring Tony Touch & DJ Doo Wop [a.k.a. Diaz Brothers]) (2:19)
9. "Too Slick" (Featuring Yungun) (2:20)
10. "So What It Do Now?" (Featuring Aceyalone) (4:07)
11. "We Got That" (Featuring Nature & Solar) (3:03)
12. "Jazzy Wayz (7 Grand Exclusive)" (3:21)
13. "Stand Up (Some Things'll Never Change) (Reggae Mix)" (Featuring Damian Marley) (3:08)
14. "Hot Like That" (Featuring Medinah) (2:36)
15. "No Need for Stress" (Featuring Mr. Lif) (2:55)
16. "Back to the Future" (Featuring Caron Wheeler & C.Knowledge) (2:58)
17. "Assasino" (Featuring Young Pablo) (1:58)
18. "The Game Needs Me" (Featuring Blue Scholars & Common Market) (4:01)
19. "Feed the Hungry (Solar Remix)" (1:19)
20. "Can't Stop the Movement (7 Grand)" (Featuring Ms. Camille) (2:32)
