= Ki-Oku =

Studio album by Toshinori Kondo and DJ Krush
- Released: August 8, 1996
- Studio: Metal Box (Kawasaki)
- Genres: Jazz; trip hop
- Length: 56:40
- Label: Sony
- Producers: Toshinori Kondo; DJ Krush

DJ Krush chronology
Meiso (1995)	Ki-Oku (1996)	MiLight (1996)

Alternative cover
- European edition

Alternative cover
- US edition

Ki-Oku (記憶, Kioku) is a collaborative studio album by Japanese jazz trumpeter Toshinori Kondo and Japanese hip-hop producer DJ Krush. It was released on August 8, 1996, in Japan by Sony Music Entertainment. The album was issued in Europe by the R&S Records imprint Apollo on January 26, 1998, and in the United States by Instinct Records on March 23, 1999.

== Composition ==
Ki-Oku consists of 10 proper tracks and three short interludes. It features a cover of "Sun Is Shining", which was originally written and performed by Bob Marley.

== Critical reception ==
Professional ratings
Review scores
Source	Rating
AllMusic	4/5 stars
The Guardian	3/5 stars
Muzik	9/10
Uncut	3/5 stars

Rick Anderson of AllMusic said that Ki-Oku is primarily an album of "smooth-groove jazz" music, but "reveals more with repeated listens; if it sounds too easy at first, listen again – there's lots of interesting stuff going on beneath what sometimes sounds like a merely pleasant surface." In 2015, Fact placed Ki-Oku at number 25 on its list of the best trip hop albums of all time.

== Track listing ==
All tracks are written by Toshinori Kondo and DJ Krush, except where noted.

No.	Title	Writer(s)	Length
1.	"Toh-Sui" (透睡)		4:57
2.	"Tobira-1" (扉-1)		0:35
3.	"Mu-Getsu" (無月)		6:19
4.	"Ha-Doh" (波動)		5:24
5.	"Sun Is Shining"	Bob Marley	6:52
6.	"Mu-Chu" (夢宙)		6:28
7.	"Tobira-2" (扉-2)		0:45
8.	"Fu-Yu" (浮遊)		4:56
9.	"Ki-Gen" (帰幻)		4:40
10.	"Ko-Ku" (孤空)		5:23
11.	"Shoh-Ka" (昇花)		4:39
12.	"Bu-Seki" (舞石)		4:58
13.	"Tobira-3" (扉-3)		0:44
Total length:			56:40

== Personnel ==
Credits are adapted from the album's liner notes.

Musicians

- Toshinori Kondo – acoustic trumpet, electric trumpet, arrangement
- DJ Krush – beats, programming, scratching, arrangement

Production

- Toshinori Kondo – production
- DJ Krush – production
- Noriko Asano – executive production
- Shuichi Ikebuchi – mixing, recording
- Masahito Kitayama – executive production
- Koichi "Oppenheimer" Matsuki – mixing on "Sun Is Shining"
- Yuki Noda – executive production
- Masayo Takise – mastering
- Naohiko Yamada – associate production

Design

- Mikio Hasui – photography
- Miki Terada – art direction, design
- Masakazu Yamamoto – art direction, design
- Shigeru Yamaoka – art direction, design

== Charts ==
Chart (1998)	Peak position
UK Albums (Official Charts)	155
UK Dance Albums (OCC)	4
UK Independent Albums (Official Charts)	12
