= Version 7.0: The Street Scriptures =

Studio album by Guru
- Released: June 21, 2005
- Recorded: 2004–2005
- Genre: Hip-hop
- Length: 59:31
- Label: 7 Grand
- Producer: Solar

Guru chronology
Baldhead Slick & da Click (2001)	Version 7.0: The Street Scriptures (2005)	Guru's Jazzmatazz, Vol. 4: The Hip Hop Jazz Messenger: Back to the Future (2007)

Professional ratings
Review scores
Source	Rating
AllMusic	3/5 stars
IGN	7.9/10
RapReviews	8.5/10

Version 7.0: The Street Scriptures is the fifth solo studio album by American rapper Guru. It was released on June 21, 2005 via 7 Grand Records. Produced entirely by Solar, it features guest appearances from B-Real, DJ Doo Wop, Jaguar Wright, Jean Grae, Styles P and Talib Kweli. The Greek version features verses from the Greek rapper Εισβολέας (Invader) for 33⅓ Entertainment. The track "Cave In" was featured in the 2005 racing video game Juiced.

== Track listing ==
No.	Title	Length
1.	"No Time"	3:12
2.	"False Prophets"	3:07
3.	"Step in the Arena 2 (I'm Sayin')" (featuring Doo Wop)	2:35
4.	"Don Status" (featuring Styles P)	2:52
5.	"Hood Dreamin'"	2:16
6.	"Cave In"	1:58
7.	"Surviving the Game"	2:33
8.	"Hall of Fame"	3:51
9.	"Talk to Me" (featuring Jaguar Wright)	4:11
10.	"Too Dark See"	3:09
11.	"Power, Money and Influence" (featuring Jean Grae and Talib Kweli)	4:12
12.	"Kingpin"	3:07
13.	"Fa Keeps"	3:26
14.	"Real Life" (featuring B-Real)	2:47
15.	"Feed the Hungry"	3:04
16.	"Talkin Loud and Frontin"	2:53
17.	"Open House"	3:04
18.	"I Gotta..."	2:47
19.	"What's My Life Like?"	4:27
Total length:		59:31

== Charts ==
Chart (2005)	Peak position
US Top R&B/Hip-Hop Albums (Billboard)	54
US Independent Albums (Billboard)	24
