= Jaku (album) =

Studio album by DJ Krush
- Released: 7 September 2004
- Genres: Hip-hop, trip hop, downtempo, electronic
- Length: 63:41
- Labels: Columbia, RED Ink Records
- Producer: DJ Krush

DJ Krush chronology
The Message at the Depth (2002)	Jaku (2004)	Butterfly Effect (2015)

Jaku (寂, Jaku) is the eighth solo studio album by Japanese hip-hop producer DJ Krush. It was released overseas on 7 September 2004, and in Japan on 3 November 2004. It peaked at number 123 on the Oricon Albums Chart, as well as number 16 on the Billboard Top Dance/Electronic Albums chart.

== Production ==
The album features guest appearances from American rappers Mr. Lif ("Nosferatu") and Aesop Rock ("Kill Switch"), both of whom were signed to Definitive Jux at that time.

== Critical reception ==
Professional ratings
Review scores
Source	Rating
AllMusic	3/5 stars
Pitchfork	7.3/10
PopMatters	favorable
Stylus Magazine	B−

Cameron Macdonald of Pitchfork gave the album a 7.3 out of 10, saying, "Krush's use of space and texture remain not just formidable, but remarkably relevant." Tim O'Neil of PopMatters wrote: "This album is merely an indicator that Krush has mastered, as few before him have, the subtle art of true cultural assimilation through the prism of electronic music."

== Track listing ==
No.	Title	Length
1.	"Still Island" (featuring Shuzan Morita)	5:06
2.	"Road to Nowhere"	3:21
3.	"Nosferatu" (featuring Mr. Lif)	3:45
4.	"The Beginning"	3:55
5.	"Transition"	1:57
6.	"Stormy Cloud" (featuring Ken Shima)	5:54
7.	"Univearth" (featuring Tetsuro Naito)	5:20
8.	"Decks-Athron" (featuring Tatsuki)	6:17
9.	"Kill Switch" (featuring Aesop Rock)	4:20
10.	"Pretense"	3:02
11.	"Slit of Cloud" (featuring Akira Sakata)	6:25
12.	"Passage"	1:35
13.	"Beyond Raging Waves" (featuring Shinichi Kinoshita)	4:23
14.	"Distant Voices"	3:22
15.	"Song 2"	4:59

Japanese edition bonus tracks
No.	Title	Length
16.	"指教"	4:36
17.	"四極"	5:12

== Charts ==
Chart	Peak position
French Albums (SNEP)	161
Japanese Albums (Oricon)	123
US Top Dance/Electronic Albums (Billboard)	16
