= Kakusei (album) =

Studio album by DJ Krush
- Released: 9 September 1998
- Genres: Ambient, breakbeat, trip hop
- Length: 69:12
- Labels: Sony Music Entertainment Japan, RED Ink Records
- Producer: DJ Krush

DJ Krush chronology
Holonic-The Self Megamix (1997)	Kakusei (1998)	Zen (2001)

Kakusei (覚醒, Kakusei) is the fifth solo studio album by Japanese hip-hop producer DJ Krush. It was released in Japan on 9 September 1998, and overseas on 21 September 1999. It peaked at number 95 on the Oricon Albums Chart.

== Critical reception ==
Professional ratings
Review scores
Source	Rating
AllMusic	4.5/5 stars
JazzTimes	unfavorable
The Stranger	favorable

Ned Raggett of AllMusic gave the album 4.5 stars out of 5, calling it "another invigorating, moody, and powerful release." Dave Segal of The Stranger said, "Krush certainly isn't the first producer to apply minimalism to hip-hop, but unlike nearly every other work in the art form, Kakusei seems to exist in a hermetic world, a stark temple of funk."

In 2014, Metro Weekly included it on the "20 Great Stoner Albums" list.

== Track listing ==
No.	Title	Length
1.	"Intro"	1:03
2.	"Escapee" (featuring A.S.A.)	3:50
3.	"Parallel Distortion" (featuring DJ Sak)	3:26
4.	"Inorganizm" (featuring DJ Kensei and DJ Hide)	6:38
5.	"Deltaforest" (featuring Jun Sawada)	5:15
6.	"Crimson"	2:33
7.	"The Dawn" (featuring Shawn J. Period)	5:16
8.	"Interlude"	2:08
9.	"85 Loop"	4:58
10.	"Rust" (featuring KK)	3:14
11.	"1200" (featuring Hideo)	5:16
12.	"Krushed Wall" (featuring Rhythm Troops)	5:02
13.	"The Kinetics" (featuring Mista Sinista)	3:15
14.	"Final Home"	4:37
15.	"No More" (featuring DJ Yas and DJ Hazu)	6:10
16.	"Outro"	1:47
17.	"Final Home (Vocal Version)" (featuring Esthero)	4:44

== Charts ==
Chart	Peak position
Japanese Albums (Oricon)	95
