= Druide informatique =

Canadian technology company and developer of writing assistance software Antidote

Druide informatique inc.
- Headquarters: Montreal, QC, Canada
- Website: https://www.druide.com/

Druide informatique is a Canadian-based technology company best known for developing and publishing Antidote, a writing assistance software suite for French and English.

== History ==
The company was founded in early 1993 by Éric Brunelle along with two associates, Bertrand Pelletier and André d'Orsonnens.

The first version of the Antidote writing assistance software was commercialized in 1996.

In June 2004, Druide Informatique received the Octas Award for "Technological Innovation in the category of companies with fewer than 200 employees" for its Antidote software.

In 2006, the company launched Web Élixir, a software tool designed to ensure the quality of French-language websites.

In September 2008, Druide Informatique released Antidote Mobile, a version of its software optimized for the iPod and iPhone.

In 2012, the company acquired the typing tutorial software Tap'Touche (known as Typing Pal in English) from the company De Marque.

Between 2012 and 2013, Druide Informatique was involved in a legal dispute over copyright with the publisher Québec Amérique (QA). QA alleged that Druide had commercialized the eighth version of Antidote (released in September 2012) without reaching an agreement regarding the use of specific elements from its Visual Dictionary.

In November 2020, Druide launched "Antidote+" packages, which bundled access to Antidote 10, Antidote Web, and Antidote Mobile for individuals and families via a subscription model.
