= Guru 8.0: Lost and Found =

Guru 8.0: Lost & Found

Studio album by Guru
- Released: 2009
- Recorded: 2008–2009
- Genre: Hip hop
- Label: 7 Grand
- Producer: Guru; Solar

Guru chronology
The Best of Guru's Jazzmatazz (2008)	Guru 8.0: Lost & Found (2009)

Professional ratings
Review scores
Source	Rating
AllMusic	4/5 stars
RapReviews	6/10

Guru 8.0: Lost & Found is the seventh and final studio album by American rapper Guru. It was released through 7 Grand Records in 2009.

== Critical reception ==
The Skinny thought that Solar's "exquisite production skills are evident throughout all of Lost and Found but are most prominent on futuristic anthems 'Fastlane' and 'Cee What We Do'." Complex called the title track "Guru at his most comfortable ... splicing a street corner aesthetic with divine wisdom and highbrow wit, the sole captain of his ship."

AllMusic deemed the album "distinctively harder in tone and content than his JAZZMATAZZ efforts."

== Track listing ==
1. "Lost and Found" (3:42)
2. "Fastlane" (3:22)
3. "Ride" (featuring Omar) (3:28)
4. "No Gimmick Sh•t" (featuring DJ Doo Wop) (2:58)
5. "Read Between Tha Linez Solar" (featuring K Born & Highpower) (3:29)
6. "Best of My Yearz" (3:03)
7. "Divine Rule" (2:23)
8. "When U Least Expect" (featuring K Born & Highpower) (2:57)
9. "After Time" (featuring Solar) (2:32)
10. "Those Dayz R Gone" (2:42)
11. "Stop Frontin" (2:48)
12. "Own Worst Enemy" (3:54)
13. "Cee What We Do" (3:23)
14. "Love-Hate Thang" (3:23)
15. "It's A Shock" (2:27)
16. "6 Cipher" (featuring K Born & Highpower) (3:29)
17. "7 Grand, Off Tha Chain" (3:18)
