= DJ Krush =

Japanese record producer and DJ

DJ Krush 石 英明
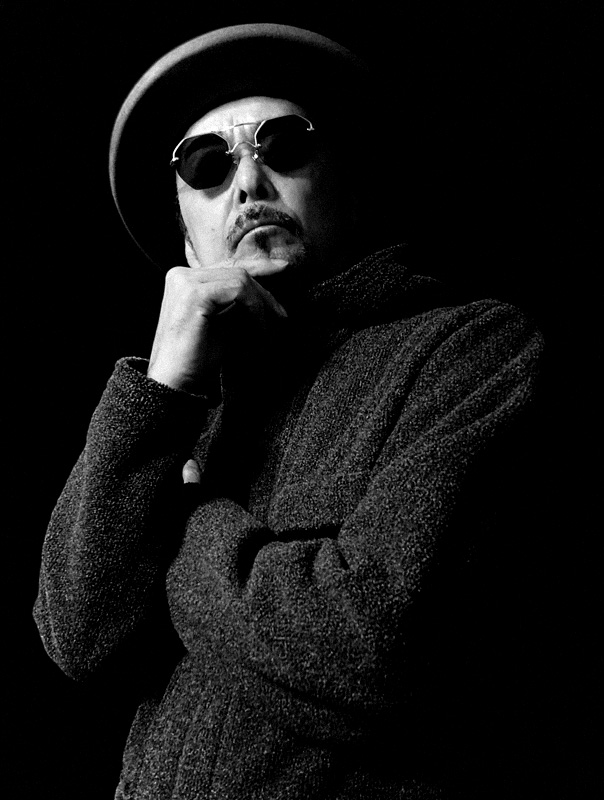
- DJ Krush in 2023

Background information
- Born: Hideaki Ishi; July 29, 1962 (age 64); Tokyo, Japan
- Genres: Instrumental hip-hop, ambient music, hip-hop, trip hop, turntablism
- Occupations: Record producer; DJ
- Instruments: Music sequencer, turntable, sampler, mixer
- Years active: 1985–present
- Labels: Sony Music Entertainment Japan, Shadow, Mo' Wax, RED Ink, FFRR
- Website: djkrush.jp

Hideaki Ishi (石 英明, Ishi Hideaki; born July 29, 1962), better known by his stage name DJ Krush, is a Japanese record producer and DJ. He is known for his atmospheric instrumental production which incorporates sound elements from nature, and extensive use of jazz and soul samples.

== Early life ==
Ishi was born in Tokyo in 1962. He dropped out of school at an early age and joined a local gang and, a few years later, the yakuza. Early in his career as a yakuza underling, Ishi discovered a severed finger wrapped in paper on his desk. Later, after discovering that it had belonged to a friend, he decided to leave the yakuza and cut ties with the criminal underworld. Ishi was inspired to start DJing after seeing the film Wild Style in 1983. "When I discovered the film Wild Style in 1983 I found what I really wanted to do, to express myself," he said in a 2015 interview. "Breaking, grafitti, rap, DJ… I always liked music so I chose DJ. My body wasn’t built for breaking, DJing was the thing for me."

== Career ==
Aside from being considered one of the pioneers of Japanese hip-hop, Ishi has established himself as one of the most respected artists and producers in the hip-hop industry, both in Japan and abroad. Upon entering the industry, Ishi, with his experimental beats and instrumental sounds, changed the face of hip-hop at a time when it was dominated by the American rap scene. He is reluctant to identify his music with any particular genre, for it would place limits on his listeners and on his talents. He has been regarded as ambient, trip hop, some combination of the two, and hip-hop. DJ Krush prefers to exercise an ideological distance from the genres he is usually grouped into, while maintaining a healthy appreciation for all music forms and styles. Still, in general, he admits to having more affinity to the musical underground than the mainstream. "Hip hop in Japan is divided in two parts. Mainstream and Underground," he says. "Underground is more interesting and I feel comfortable here."

== Discography ==
=== Studio albums ===
- Krush (1994)
- Strictly Turntablized (1994)
- Meiso (1995)
- Ki-Oku (1996) (with Toshinori Kondo)
- MiLight (1996)
- Kakusei (1998)
- Ga (1999) (with DJ Hide and DJ Sak, as Ryu)
- Zen (2001)
- The Message at the Depth (2002)
- Jaku (2004)
- Butterfly Effect (2015)
- Kiseki (2017)
- Cosmic Yard (2018)
- Trickster (2020)
- Saisei (2024)
- TOKYØHUM (2026)

=== Compilation albums ===
- Reload: The Remix Collection (2001)
- Stepping Stones: The Self Remixed Best: Lyricism (2006)
- Stepping Stones: The Self Remixed Best: Soundscapes (2006)

=== Mixtapes ===
- Cold Krush Cuts (1997) (with DJ Food and Coldcut)
- Holonic-The Self Megamix (1997)
- Code 4109 (2000)
- OuMuPo 6 (2006)

=== EPs ===
- Bad Brothers (1994) (with Ronny Jordan)
- The DJ Krush EP (1995)
- Meiso: Another Maze (1996)
- Selektions (1997)
- Code 1255 (1999) (with Gravity)
- Saihate (2016) (with Bill Laswell)
- 道 -Story- (2022)

=== Singles ===
- "Lost and Found" b/w "Kemuri" (1994) (with DJ Shadow)
- "A Whim" b/w "89.9 Megamix" (1995) (with DJ Shadow)
- "Big City Lover" (1995)
- "Dig This Vibe" (1995) (with Roni Size)
- "Meiso" (1996)
- "Headz 2 Sampler" (1996) (with Zimbabwe Legit)
- "Only the Strong Survive" (1996)
- "Milight" (1997)
- "Final Home" (1999)
- "Tragicomic" (2000) (with Aco and Twigy)
- "Never Too Soon" (1999) (with DJ Hide and DJ Sak, as Ryu)
- "Rhythm Asobi" (2000) (with DJ Hide and DJ Sak, as Ryu)
- "Supreme Team" b/w "Alepheuo" (2003)
- "Koufu no Tsubasa: Breathe of Wings" (2011)
- "Kuon: Far and Away" (2011)
- "Shuya no Chiheisen: Sleepless Horizon" (2011)
- "Kagi no Te: Phasic Swing" (2011)
- "Kouro: Optical Path" (2012)
- "Kuroi Ame: Black Rain" (2012)
- "Aoi Ame: Green Rain" (2012)
- "Genun: Passage of Time" (2012)
- "Kyofu: Conflicts" (2012)
- "Yushin: Brave Heart" (2012)
- "Shuen" (2014) (with Bill Laswell)

=== DVDs ===
- History of DJ Krush (2007)

=== Guest appearances ===
- Monday Michiru - "Cruel 2 Be Kind" from Double Image (1998)
- Luna Sea - "Sweetest Coma Again" and "Kiss" from Lunacy (2000)
- Ryuichi Sakamoto - "Zero Landmine" from Zero Landmine (2001)
- Yasushi Ide - "Black Night" (2006)
- DJ Kentaro - "Kikkake" from Contrast (2012)

=== Productions ===
- Inoran - Sou (1997)
- Kukoo Da Baga Bonez & World - "Krush Ya Dreams" from Insane Psycho Home (2002)

=== Remixes ===
- Monday Michiru - "When I'm with You (DJ Krush Mix)" from Groovement (1994)
- k.d. lang - "Sexuality (DJ Krush Full Mix)" (1995)
- Roy Hargrove - "Roy Allan (DJ Krush Remix)" (1995)
- Naniwa Man - "L.O.V.E. '95 (DJ Krush Mix)" (1995)
- DJ Vadim - "Variations in U.S.S.R. (DJ Krush Remix)" from U.S.S.R. Reconstruction: Theories Explained (1997)
- Miki Nakatani - "Tengoku yori Yaban (DJ Krush Mix)" from Vague (1997)
- Sugizo - "Eternity in Luna" from Replicant Truth? (1997)
- Sugizo - "Spiritual Prayer" and "Shangri-la of the Europa" from Replicant Prayer (Remixes) (1997)
- Monday Michiru - "Givin' It (DJ Krush Remix)" from Adoption Agency (1999)
- Kodō - "Ibuki Reconstruction" from Sai-So (1999)
- Toshinobu Kubota - "Soul Bangin' (DJ Krush 80's Mix)" (1999)
- Boom Boom Satellites - "On the Painted Desert (DJ Krush Remix)" from On the Painted Desert - Rampant Colors (1999)
- Aco - "Aishu to Ballad (DJ Krush Remix)" from The Other Side of Absolute Ego (2000)
- Dragon Ash - "Deep Impact (DJ Krush Remix)" (2000)
- Nigo - "Something for the People (DJ Krush Remix)" (2000)
- Herbie Hancock - "The Essence (DJ Krush Main Mix)" (2001)
- Boredoms - Rebore, vol. 3 (2001)
- Tetsuya Komuro - "Blue Fantasy Remix" (2002)
- Akira Sakata - "Kaigarabushi (DJ Krush Remix)" (2002)
- Soulive - "Turn It Out (Remix)" (2003)
- Angelina - "Babybayboo (DJ Krush Remix)" (2003)

=== Compilation appearances ===
- "Only the Strong Survive" and "A Whim" from The Story of Mo'Wax (1995)
- "Shin-Ki-Row" from Altered Beats: Assassin Knowledges of the Remanipulated (1996)
- "Ryu-Ki" from Offbeat: A Red Hot Soundtrip (1996)
