= Ronny Jordan =

British guitarist (1962–2014)

Background information
- Born: Robert Laurence Albert Simpson; 29 November 1962; London, England
- Died: 13 January 2014 (aged 51) Chicago, Illinois, United States
- Genres: Jazz, acid jazz, smooth jazz
- Occupations: Musician, singer, songwriter
- Instrument: Guitar
- Years active: 1992–2014
- Label: Island

Robert Laurence Albert Simpson, known professionally as Ronny Jordan (29 November 1962 – 13 January 2014) was a British guitarist and part of the acid jazz movement at the end of the twentieth century. Jordan described his music as "urban jazz", a blend of jazz, hip-hop, and R&B.

== Biography ==
He came to prominence after being featured on Guru's Jazzmatazz, Vol. 1, released in 1993. He was also one of the artists whose recordings are featured on Stolen Moments: Red Hot + Cool—a compilation album released in 1994 to benefit the Red Hot Organization.

Following 1992's The Antidote, recordings from Jordan have featured on the Billboard charts, especially his acid-jazz Miles Davis cover of "So What", which was a worldwide hit. He was also the recipient of The MOBO Best Jazz Act Award and the Gibson Guitar Best Jazz Guitarist Award. His 2000 release, A Brighter Day, was nominated for the Grammy Award for Best Contemporary Jazz Album.

Jordan's song "The Jackal" (from his 1993 album The Quiet Revolution) gained prominence when actress Allison Janney in the role of C. J. Cregg lip-synched it in the episode "Six Meetings Before Lunch" of The West Wing. She also did so on Arsenio Hall's television show in September 2013.

Jordan died on 13 January 2014. His "body was found at home several days after his return from an overseas tour in South Africa. An autopsy was performed which although inconclusive, confirmed there was no foul play or injury involved."

== Discography ==
- The Antidote (4th & Broadway/Island, 1992)
- The Quiet Revolution (4th & Broadway/Island, 1993) AUS No. 48
- Bad Brothers (Island [UK], 1994)
- Light to Dark (4th & Broadway/Island, 1996)
- A Brighter Day (Blue Note, 2000)
- Off the Record (Blue Note, 2001)
- The Collection (Spectrum/Island, 2002) compilation
- At Last (N-Coded/Warlock, 2003)
- After 8 (N-Coded/Warlock, 2004)
- The Rough & The Smooth (Private 'N Public Music 70026 12929 22, 2010)

=== Singles ===
Year	Single	Peak chart positions				Album
Year	Single	UK	FRA	US R&B	US Rap	Album
1992	"So What!" b/w "Cool and Funky"	32	38	—	—	The Antidote
1992	"Get To Grips" b/w "Flat Out"	—	—	—	—	The Antidote
1992	"After Hours (The Antidote)" b/w "Nite Spice"	—	—	51	—	The Antidote
1993	"Under Your Spell" b/w "In Full Swing"	72	—	—	—	The Quiet Revolution
1994	"Tinsel Town" b/w "My Favourite Things"	64	—	—	—	The Quiet Revolution
1994	"Come With Me" b/w "S**t Goes Down"	63	—	—	—	The Quiet Revolution
1996	"The Law" [EP]	—	—	—	—	Light To Dark
1996	"It's You" (US promo only)	—	—	—	—	Light To Dark
2000	"A Brighter Day" (US only)	—	—	—	20	A Brighter Day
2001	"London Lowdown" (US promo only)	—	—	—	—	A Brighter Day
"—" denotes releases that did not chart or were not released.
