= Guru's Jazzmatazz, Vol. 1 =

Jazzmatazz. Vol. 1
- "An Experimental Fusion of Hip-Hop and Jazz"

Studio album by Guru
- Released: May 18, 1993
- Recorded: 1992–1993
- Studio: D&D (New York City)
- Genre: Jazz rap
- Length: 44:06
- Label: Chrysalis
- Producer: Guru

Guru chronology
Jazzmatazz. Vol. 1 (1993)	Jazzmatazz, Vol. 2: The New Reality (1995)

Singles from Jazzmatazz. Vol. 1
- 1. "Trust Me" Released: 1993; 2. "No Time to Play" Released: 1993; 3. "Loungin'" Released: 1993

Jazzmatazz, Volume 1: An Experimental Fusion of Hip-Hop and Jazz, is the debut solo studio album by American hip hop recording artist Guru. It was released on May 18, 1993, by Chrysalis Records. The recording sessions took place at D&D Studios, in New York. The album was produced by Guru, who also served as executive producer with Duff Marlowe and Patrick Moxey.

The album combines a live jazz band performance with hip hop production and rapping. It features contributions from singers N'Dea Davenport, Carleen Anderson, Dee C Lee, French rapper MC Solaar, and musicians Simon Law, Branford Marsalis, Courtney Pine, Donald Byrd, Gary Barnacle, Lonnie Liston Smith, Ronny Jordan, Roy Ayers and Zachary Breaux.

Guru, quoted in the album's liner notes, talked about his natural affinity for both jazz and rap. "Jazz's mellow tracks, along with the hard rap beat, go hand-in-glove with my voice", he said.

The album made it to number 94 on the Billboard 200 and number 15 on the Top R&B/Hip-Hop Albums in the United States. In spite of the lagging American sales, Jazzmatazz, Vol. 1 was a commercial success in Europe, where jazz was much more popular in the 1990s. It peaked at No. 43 in Germany, No. 49 in Sweden, No. 58 in the UK, No. 67 in the Netherlands, and No. 139 in France. It also apeaked at No. 24 in New Zealand, Oceania. Its lead single "Trust Me" peaked at No. 34 on the UK Singles Chart and No. 105 on the US Billboard Hot 100. Its second single, "No Time to Play", peaked at No. 25 in the UK. SPIN ranked the album at number 20 on their 'The 20 Best Albums of 1993' list.

== Critical reception ==
Professional ratings
Initial reviews (in 1993)
Review scores
Source	Rating
Chicago Tribune	2/4 stars
Robert Christgau	(dud)
DownBeat	3.5/5 stars
Jazz Forum	4/5 stars
Q	4/5 stars
Rolling Stone	3.5/5 stars
Select	3/5 medals
The Windsor Star	B−

Professional ratings
Retrospective reviews (after 1993)
Review scores
Source	Rating
AllMusic	4/5 stars
(The New) Rolling Stone Album Guide	3/5 stars
Spin Alternative Record Guide	7/10

The New York Amsterdam News called the album "an experimental fusion of jazz and rap that articulates the ties of Black music through the ages and embodies the quintessence of Afro-American cultures." The Windsor Star noted that "two cuts stand out featuring singer N'Dea Davenport, who offers a fresh voice to the project." The Philadelphia Inquirer determined that "the soloists conjure a variety of deep-hued moods, but Guru stops short of delivering anything more than polite editorials and bland travelogues." Maclean's listed Jazzmatazz as the fifth best album of 1993.

== Track listing ==
All lyrics are written by Keith Elam, except tracks 3 and 9 written with N'Dea Davenport, and track 12 written with Courtney Pine.

No.	Title	Producer(s)	Length
1.	"Introduction"	Guru	1:20
2.	"Loungin'" (featuring Donald Byrd)	Guru; Donald Byrd^{[c]}	4:38
3.	"When You're Near" (featuring N'Dea Davenport and Simon Law)	Guru; N'Dea Davenport^{[c]}	4:02
4.	"Transit Ride" (featuring Branford Marsalis and Zachary Breaux)	Guru; Branford Marsalis^{[c]}	3:58
5.	"No Time to Play" (featuring Dee C Lee, Ronny Jordan and Big Shug)	Guru; Ronny Jordan^{[c]}	4:54
6.	"Down the Backstreets" (featuring Lonnie Liston Smith)	Guru; Lonnie Liston Smith^{[c]}	4:47
7.	"Respectful Dedications"	Guru	0:54
8.	"Take a Look (At Yourself)" (featuring Roy Ayers)	Guru; Roy Ayers^{[c]}	3:59
9.	"Trust Me" (featuring N'Dea Davenport)	Guru; N'Dea Davenport^{[c]}	4:27
10.	"Slicker Than Most" (featuring Gary Barnacle and the Cutthroats)	Guru	2:35
11.	"Le Bien, le Mal" (featuring MC Solaar, Black Jack and Mickey "Mus Mus")	Guru; DJ Jimmy Jay^{[c]}; MC Solaar^{[c]}	3:21
12.	"Sights in the City" (featuring Carleen Anderson, Courtney Pine and Simon Law)	Guru; Carleen Anderson^{[c]}; Courtney Pine^{[c]}	5:10
Total length:			44:06

Notes

- ^{^[c]} signifies a co-producer.

== Personnel ==
Credits adapted from liner notes.

Musicians

- Keith "GuRu" Elam – vocals, arrangement
- N'Dea Davenport – vocals (tracks: 3, 9)
- Diane "Dee C Lee" Sealy – vocals (track 5)
- Claude "MC Solaar" M'Barali – vocals (track 11)
- Carleen Anderson – vocals (track 12)
- Cary "Big Shug" Guy – additional vocals (track 5)
- The Cutthroats – additional vocals (track 10)
- Black Jack – additional vocals (track 11)
- Mickey "Mus Mus" Mosman – additional vocals (track 11)
- Donald Byrd – trumpet and piano (track 2)
- Simon "The Funky Ginger" Law – keyboards (tracks: 3, 12)
- Branford Marsalis – alto and soprano saxophone (track 4)
- Zachary Breaux – guitar (track 4)
- DJ Jazzy Nice – scratches (track 4)
- Robert "Ronny Jordan" Simpson – guitar (track 5)
- Lonnie Liston Smith – acoustic and electric piano (track 6)
- James "Lil' Dap" Heath – live drums (track 6)
- Roy Ayers – vibraslap and vibraphone (track 8)
- Gary Barnacle – flute and saxophone (track 10)
- Christophe "Jimmy Jay" Viguier – scratches (track 11)
- Courtney Pine – flute, alto and soprano saxophone (track 12)

Production

- Guru – producer, mixing, executive producer, concept development
- Donald Byrd – co-producer (track 2)
- N'Dea Davenport – co-producer (tracks: 3, 9)
- Branford Marsalis – co-producer (track 4)
- Ronny Jordan – co-producer (track 5)
- Lonnie Liston Smith – co-producer (track 6)
- Roy Ayers – co-producer (track 8)
- DJ Jimmy Jay – co-producer (track 11)
- MC Solaar – co-producer (track 11)
- Courtney Pine – co-producer (track 12)
- Carleen Anderson – co-producer (track 12)
- Philippe "Zdar" Cerboneschi – engineering
- James B. Mansfield – engineering
- Craig Marcus – engineering
- Kieran Walsh – engineering
- Jason Bell – engineering
- Joe Quinde – engineering
- Luke Allen – engineering assistant
- Doug Boehm – engineering assistant
- David Carpenter – engineering assistant
- Tracii D. Sherman – engineering assistant
- Tony Dawsey – mastering
- Patrick Moxey – executive producer, concept development
- Duff Marlowe – executive producer

Design

- Henry Marquez – art direction
- Diane Cuddy – design
- Michael Benabib – photography
- Marc Villalonga – photography
- Ray Burmiston – photography
- Bill Adler – liner notes

== Charts ==
=== Weekly charts ===
Chart (1993)	Peak position
Australian Albums (ARIA)	62
Dutch Albums (Album Top 100)	67
French Albums (SNEP)	139
German Albums (Offizielle Top 100)	43
New Zealand Albums (RMNZ)	24
Swedish Albums (Sverigetopplistan)	49
UK Albums (Official Charts)	58
US Billboard 200	94
US Top R&B/Hip-Hop Albums (Billboard)	15

2022 charting for Guru's Jazzmatazz. Vol. 1
Chart (2022)	Peak position
Belgian Albums (Ultratop Wallonia)	103
German Albums (Offizielle Top 100)	32

=== Year-end charts ===
Chart (1993)	Position
US Top R&B/Hip-Hop Albums (Billboard)	78
