= Gang Starr discography =

American hip hop duo discography

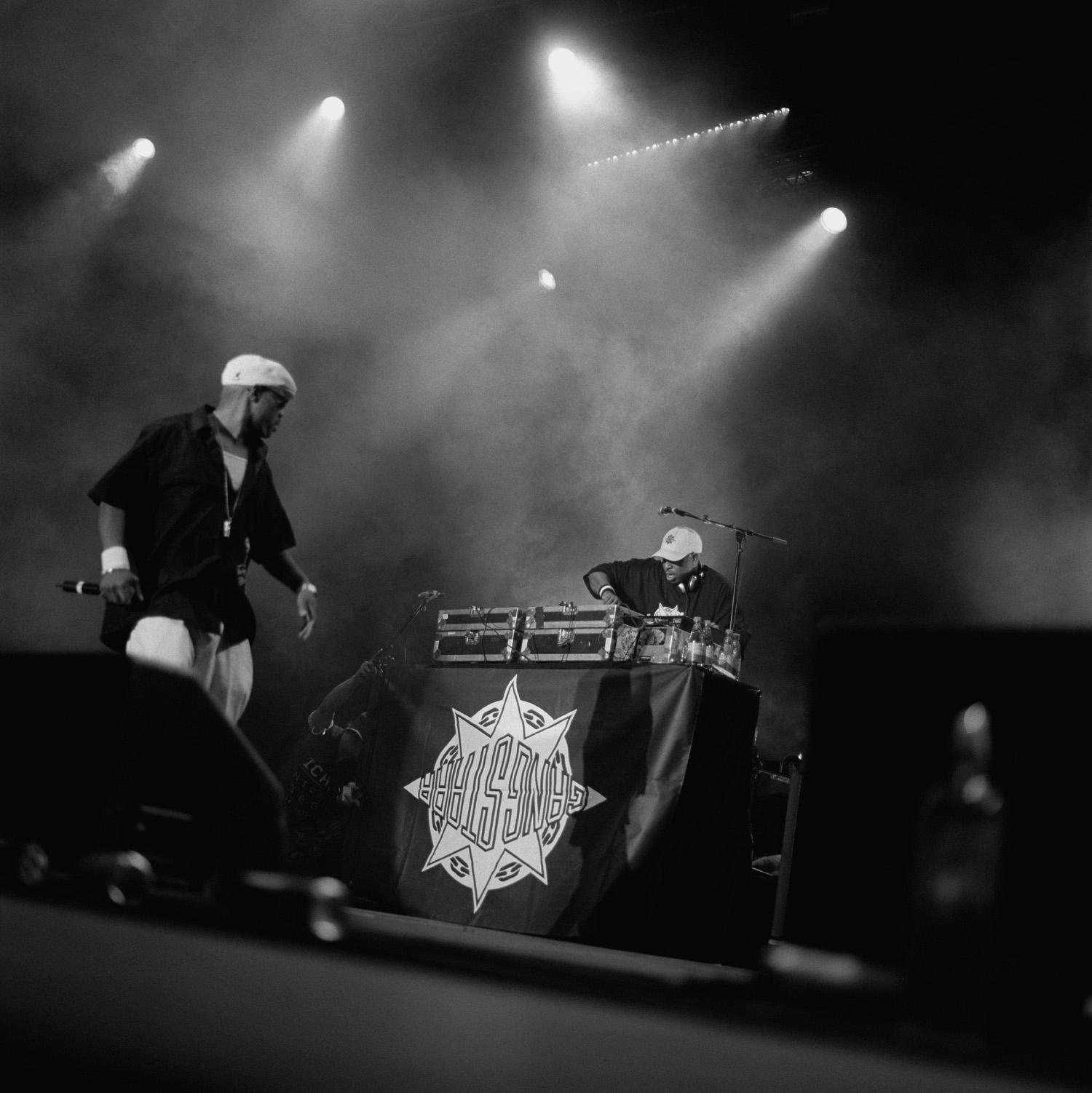
- Gang Starr performing in Hamburg, 1999.
- Studio albums: 7
- Compilation albums: 2
- Singles: 31
- Music videos: 23
- Promotional singles: 1

American hip hop duo Gang Starr have released seven studio albums, two compilation albums, thirty-one singles, one promotional single and nine music videos.

== Albums ==
=== Studio albums ===
List of studio albums, with selected chart positions, sales figures and certifications
Title	Album details	Peak chart positions									Sales	Certifications
Title	Album details	US	US R&B	AUS	CAN	FRA	GER	NLD	SWE	UK	Sales	Certifications
No More Mr. Nice Guy	Released: June 5, 1989; Label: Wild Pitch; Formats: CD, LP, cassette, digital download	—	83	—	—	—	—	—	—	—	US: 36,000	
Step In the Arena	Released: January 15, 1991 (US); Label: Chrysalis; Formats: CD, LP, cassette, digital download	121	19	141	—	—	—	—	—	36	US: 241,000	
Daily Operation	Released: May 5, 1992 (US); Label: Chrysalis; Formats: CD, LP, cassette, digital download	65	14	—	—	—	—	—	—	—	US: 248,000	
Hard to Earn	Released: March 8, 1994 (US); Label: Chrysalis; Formats: CD, LP, cassette, digital download	25	2	—	—	—	—	—	—	29	US: 307,000	
Moment of Truth	Released: March 31, 1998 (US); Label: Noo Trybe, Virgin; Formats: CD, LP, cassette, digital download	6	1	184	14	70	94	51	28	43	US: 472,000	RIAA: Gold; BPI: Silver; MC: Gold
The Ownerz	Released: June 24, 2003 (US); Label: Virgin; Formats: CD, LP, cassette, digital download	18	5	—	—	39	50	51	47	74		
One of the Best Yet	Released: November 1, 2019 (US); Label: To The Top/Gang Starr Enterprises/INgrooves; Formats: CD, LP, cassette, digital download	82	42	155	65	—	46	86	—	—		
"—" denotes a recording that did not chart or was not released in that territory.

=== Compilation albums ===
List of compilation albums, with selected chart positions and certifications
Title	Album details	Peak chart positions							Certifications
Title	Album details	US	US R&B	FRA	GER	NLD	SWE	UK	Certifications
Full Clip: A Decade of Gang Starr	Released: July 13, 1999 (US); Label: Noo Trybe, Virgin; Formats: CD, LP, cassette, digital download	33	11	169	48	55	47	47	RIAA: Gold; BPI: Silver
Mass Appeal: The Best of Gang Starr	Released: December 26, 2006 (US); Label: Virgin; Formats: CD, digital download	—	—	—	—	—	—	—	
"—" denotes a recording that did not chart or was not released in that territory.

== Singles ==
List of singles, with selected chart positions, showing year released and album name
Title	Year	Peak chart positions							Album
Title	Year	US	US R&B	US Rap	AUS	NLD	SWE	UK	Album
"The Lesson"	1987	—	—	—	—	—	—	—	Non-album singles
"Believe Dat!"	1987	—	—	—	—	—	—	—	Non-album singles
"Movin' On"	1988	—	—	—	—	—	—	—	Non-album singles
"Words I Manifest"	1989	—	—	—	—	—	—	—	No More Mr. Nice Guy
"Positivity"	1989	—	—	19	—	—	—	—	No More Mr. Nice Guy
"Jazz Thing"	1990	—	—	—	—	—	—	66	Mo' Better Blues (soundtrack)
"Just to Get a Rep"	1990	—	—	5	—	—	—	—	Step in the Arena
"Take a Rest"	1991	—	—	—	143	—	—	63	Step in the Arena
"Lovesick"	1991	—	—	11	13	31	38	50	Step in the Arena
"Step in the Arena"	1991	—	—	5	—	—	—	—	Step in the Arena
"Who's Gonna Take the Weight?"	1991	—	—	9	—	—	—	—	Step in the Arena
"Ex Girl to Next Girl"	1992	—	64	5	—	—	—	—	Daily Operation
"Take It Personal"	1992	—	—	1	—	—	—	—	Daily Operation
"2 Deep"	1992	—	—	—	—	—	—	67	Daily Operation
"Gotta Get Over (Taking Loot)"	1992	—	—	—	—	—	—	—	Trespass (soundtrack)
"Dwyck" (featuring Nice & Smooth)	1992	—	— (Note: "DWYCK" did not enter the Hot R&B/Hip-Hop Songs chart, but peaked at number seven on the Bubbling Under R&B/Hip-Hop Singles chart.)	25	—	—	—	—	Hard to Earn
"Mass Appeal"	1994	67	42	10	—	—	—	—	Hard to Earn
"Code of the Streets"	1994	— (Note: "Code of the Streets" did not enter the Billboard Hot 100, but peaked at number 23 on the Bubbling Under Hot 100 Singles chart.)	83	33	—	—	—	91	Hard to Earn
"Suckas Need Bodyguards"	1994	—	— (Note: "Suckas Need Bodyguards" did not enter the Hot R&B/Hip-Hop Songs chart, but peaked at number 21 on the Bubbling Under R&B/Hip-Hop Singles chart.)	44	—	—	—	—	Hard to Earn
"You Know My Steez"	1997	76	32	5	—	—	—	—	Moment of Truth
"The Militia" (featuring Big Shug and Freddie Foxxx)	1998	— (Note: "The Militia" did not enter the Billboard Hot 100, but peaked at number 12 on the Bubbling Under Hot 100 Singles chart.)	68	38	—	—	—	—	Moment of Truth
"1/2 & 1/2" (featuring M.O.P.)	1998	—	—	—	—	—	—	—	Blade (soundtrack)
"Full Clip"	1999	—	— (Note: "Full Clip" did not enter the Hot R&B/Hip-Hop Songs chart, but peaked at number two on the Bubbling Under R&B/Hip-Hop Singles chart.)	—	—	—	—	—	Full Clip: A Decade of Gang Starr
"Discipline" (featuring Total)	1999	—	58	—	—	—	—	—	Full Clip: A Decade of Gang Starr
"Skills"	2002	—	91	—	—	—	—	—	The Ownerz
"Nice Girl, Wrong Place" (featuring Boy Big)	2003	—	99	—	—	—	—	—	The Ownerz
"Rite Where You Stand" (featuring Jadakiss)	2003	—	—	26	—	—	—	—	The Ownerz
"Same Team, No Games" (featuring NYG'z & H.Stax)	2003	—	—	—	—	—	—	—	The Ownerz
"Family and Loyalty" (featuring J. Cole)	2019	—	— (Note: "Family and Loyalty" did not enter the Hot R&B/Hip-Hop Songs chart, but peaked at number eight on the Bubbling Under R&B/Hip-Hop Singles chart.)	—	—	—	—	—	One of the Best Yet
"Bad Name"	2019	—	—	—	—	—	—	—	One of the Best Yet
"Bad Name" (Remix) (featuring Method Man and Redman)	2019	—	—	—	—	—	—	—	Non-album singles
"Glowing Mic"	2020	—	—	—	—	—	—	—	Non-album singles
"Finishem"	2024	—	—	—	—	—	—	—	Non-album singles
"—" denotes a recording that did not chart or was not released in that territory.

=== Promotional singles ===
List of promotional singles, showing year released and album name
Title	Year	Album
"Royalty" (featuring K-Ci & JoJo)	1997	Moment of Truth

== Guest appearances ==
List of non-single guest appearances, with other performing artists, showing year released and album name
Title	Year	Other artist(s)	Album
"Free Your Feelings (Gifted Mix)"	1991	Slam Slam	12"
"Dedicated 2 the City" (Gang Starr Mix)	1991	Subsonic 2	Include Me Out
"Satisfaction (Gang Starr Remix)	1991	Wendy & Lisa	Re-Mix-in-a-Carnation
"I've Lost My Ignorance (And Don't Know Where to Find It) [Gang Starr Remix]	1991	Dream Warriors	12"
Qui Sème Le Vent Récolte Le Tempo" (Gang Starr Mix)	1991	MC Solaar	12"
"It's Gettin' Hectic"	1992	The Brand New Heavies	Heavy Rhyme Experience, Vol. 1
"Now You're Mine"	1992	—N/a	White Men Can't Rap (Soundtrack) / Hard to Earn
"Intelligence (Jazzie II Guru Mix)"	1992	Soul II Soul	12"
"A Little Spice (Gang Starr Remix)"	1992	Loose Ends	12"
"Sassy"	1992	Neneh Cherry	Homebrew
"What You Expected?"	1995	DJ Honda	H
"Watch What You're Saying!"	1995	Guru, Chaka Khan	Guru's Jazzmatazz, Vol. 2: The New Reality
"Lifesaver" (Remix)	1996	Guru	12"
"Work"	1998	—N/a	Caught Up (soundtrack) / Moment of Truth
"Salute Part II"	1998	M.O.P.	First Family 4 Life
"Freestyle"	1998	Funkmaster Flex	The Mix Tape, Vol. III
"Militia (Remix)"	1998	Rakim, WC	Belly (soundtrack)/Full Clip: A Decade of Gang Starr
"All 4 tha Cash"	1999	—N/a	Full Clip: A Decade of Gang Starr
"The Legacy"	1999	Group Home	A Tear for the Ghetto
"Weed Scented"	1999	A.G., O.C., Mr. Mudd	The Dirty Version
"The Piece Maker"	2000	Tony Touch	The Piece Maker
"Hustlin' Daze"	2000	Guru, Donell Jones	Guru's Jazzmatazz, Vol. 3: Streetsoul
"Where's My Ladies?"	2000	Guru, Big Shug	Guru's Jazzmatazz, Vol. 3: Streetsoul
"Back 2 Back"	2001	—N/a	Baldhead Slick & da Click
"It's Alright (Gang Starr Remix)	2001	Lina	12"
"Tha Squeeze"	2001	—N/a	Training Day (soundtrack)
"Incredible"	2002	Krumbsnatcha	Respect All, Fear None
"Blvd."	2002	Afu-Ra	Life Force Radio
"Battle"	2002	—N/a	8 Mile (soundtrack)
"Counter Punch"	2005	Big Shug	Who's Hard?
"Work, Part II"	2011	Big L	The Danger Zone

== Music videos ==
List of music videos, with directors, showing year released
Title	Year	Director(s)
"Words I Manifest"	1989	
Positivity	1989	
"Jazz Thing"	1990	Spike Lee
"Just to Get a Rep"	1990	Fab Five Freddy
"Take a Rest"	1990	
"Who's Gonna Take the Weight?"	1991	
"Lovesick"	1991	
"Step in the Arena"	1991	
"Ex Girl to the Next Girl"	1992	
"Take It Personal"	1992	
"DWYCK" (featuring Nice & Smooth)	1992	Keith Ward
"Mass Appeal"	1994	Diane Martel
"Code of the Streets"	1994	Lionel C. Martin
"Suckas Need Bodyguards"	1994	
"You Know My Steez"	1997	Terry Heller
"Royalty" (featuring K-Ci & JoJo)	1997	Ron Hightower
"The Militia" (featuring Big Shug and Freddie Foxxx)	1998	Jeff Byrd
"Discipline" (featuring Total)	1999	Rubin Whitmore II
"Full Clip"	1999	
"Skills"	2002	
"Rite Where You Stand" (featuring Jadakiss)	2003	Darren Grant
"Nice Girl, Wrong Place" (featuring Boy Big)	2003	
"Same Team, No Games" (featuring NYG'z & H.Stax)	2003	
"Family and Loyalty" (featuring J. Cole)	2019	Fab Five Freddy
“Bad Name”	2019	

== See also ==
- DJ Premier § Discography
- Guru discography
