= Hip Hop Connection =

British magazine

- Editor: Andy Cowan
- Categories: Music magazine
- First issue: 1988
- Final issue: 2009
- Company: Infamous Ink
- Country: United Kingdom
- Based in: Bath
- Language: English
- Website: "Hip Hop Connection". Archived from the original on 7 November 2006.
- ISSN: 1465-4407

Hip Hop Connection (HHC) was the longest running monthly periodical devoted entirely to hip hop culture. It was described by rapper Chuck D as "the most important magazine in the world".

== History ==
Under the editorship of Chris Hunt, the magazine published its first issue in July 1988, one month before The Source began in newsletter form. Prior to the first issue, the magazine's parent company had run a premium rate 0898 telephone information line using the same name, presented by Radio 1 DJ Dave Pearce. It invited MCs to call and record their own rhyme after listening to the best rhyme of the previous week.

HHC's early issues were its biggest selling and saw Hunt bringing together a talented group of writers and photographers, including Ekow Eshun, Malu Halasa and Vie Marshall. Future television presenter and celebrity Normski was given his own section to showcase his rap photography.

Hunt had two stints as editor before leaving for a final time in 1993. His longtime deputy Andy Cowan took over the title in November 1993. HHC changed owners several times (Popular Publications, Future Publishing, Ministry Of Sound, the Cambridge-based Infamous Ink). HHC and Popular Publications were owned by Music Maker Publications throughout the early 1990s until Music Maker was acquired by Future Publishing. Future sold the title to Ministry Of Sound in 2000. The first Ministry issue featured Mariah Carey on the front cover. Ministry tried to continue with a 'female artists only' cover policy, which had proved successful for their dance magazine but – after Kelis and Lauryn Hill – it became apparent that they were running out of suitable candidates. Ministry sold the title after one year and Andy Cowan continued to run and publish the magazine. In April 2006, Hip Hop Connection published its 200th edition, rerunning many classic interviews from its eighteen-year history.

In 2009 the magazine published its final and 232nd issue.

== Readers' Greatest Album ==
- Pre 2000: Public Enemy - It Takes a Nation of Millions to Hold Us Back
- 1995 to 2005: Raekwon - Only Built 4 Cuban Linx...

== Readers' Best Album of the Year ==
2009: Roots Manuva - Slime & Reason • 2008: Panacea - Scenic Route • 2007: unknown • 2006: unknown • 2005: unknown • 2004: unknown • 2003: unknown • 2002: Jay-Z - The Blueprint • 2001: Eminem - The Marshall Mathers LP • 2000: The Roots - Things Fall Apart • 1999: Gang Starr - Moment of Truth • 1998: Company Flow - Funcrusher Plus • 1997: Rass Kass - Soul On Ice • 1996: Raekwon - Only Built 4 Cuban Linx... • 1995: The Notorious B.I.G. - Ready to Die • 1994: Cypress Hill - Black Sunday • 1993: unknown • 1992: unknown • 1991: OG Original Gangsta - Ice-T• 1990: Silver Bullet • 1989: N.W.A. - Straight Outta Compton

== Readers' Best Single of the Year ==
2009: unknown • 2008: unknown • 2007: unknown • 2006: unknown • 2005: Klashnekoff - It's Murda • 2004: unknown • 2003: unknown • 2002: Pharoahe Monch - Fuck You • 2001: M.O.P. - Ante Up • 2000: Pharoahe Monch - Simon Says • 1999: Canibus - Second Round K.O. • 1998: Gang Starr - You Know My Steez • 1997: Jeru The Damaja - Ya Playin Yaself • 1996: Mobb Deep - Shook Ones Part II • 1995: Craig Mack - Flava In Ya Ear • 1994: Onyx - Slam • 1993: unknown • 1992: unknown • 1991: unknown • 1990: unknown • 1989: Public Enemy - Fight The Power

== Readers' Best Group of the Year ==
2009: unknown 2008: unknown 2007: unknown 2006: unknown 2005: unknown 2004: unknown 2003: unknown 2002: unknown 2001: Dilated Peoples 2000: The Roots 1999: Gang Starr 1998: Company Flow 1997: unknown 1996: unknown 1995: unknown 1994: Wu-Tang Clan 1993: unknown 1992: unknown 1991: unknown 1990: unknown 1989: N.W.A.

== Readers' Best of the 80s ==
Best Album: Public Enemy - It Takes A Nation Of Millions To Hold Us Back • Best Single: Public Enemy - Rebel Without A Pause • Best Group: Public Enemy • Best Rapper: Chuck D • Best DJ: Cash Money • Best British Artist: MC Duke • Best Record Label: Def Jam • Best Non Hiphop: Michael Jackson • Most Important Human Being: Nelson Mandela

== 100 Best Albums Ever ==
Hip Hop Connection published its readers' favourite albums in its March 2000 issue. The result, wrote compiler Mansel Fletcher, was "the essential hip-hop list that beats all others straight into a bloody pulp".

100. No I.D., Accept Your Own and Be Yourself (The Black Album) ("Anyone into top-notch hip-hop blessed with tight rhymes and clear production shouldn't pass this by")

99. Public Enemy, Apocalypse 91... The Enemy Strikes Black ("It marked their move away from the attentions of hip-hop fans, but was a grand gesture to bow out on"

98. Raw Fusion, Live from the Styleetron ("Reggae had a huge influence on their sound, while the faster beats hint at drum and bass years before it became an official brand")

97. Westside Connection, Bow Down ("Cube set aside his more political rap to fully embrace the G Thang temperament that was serving his other ex-N.W.A members so well")

96. Blak Twang, 19 Longtime ("Wit and intelligence over innovative, soulful production that successfully brought out Tai's conscious lyrics")

95. House of Pain, House of Pain ("In spite of his emerald isle ethnicity gimmick, leader Everlast was well schooled at the academy of rap")

94. Lootpack, Soundpieces: Da Antidote ("A careful blend of imaginative and clever lyrics… over DJ Rone's [sic] tight production")

93. Fugees, Blunted on Reality ("It had a mixed reception publicly, falling awkwardly between the stools of street and alternative hip-hop")

92. Mountain Brothers, Self Vol 1 ("Turning their back on samples, the Brothers record all their instrumentals live in the studio, which goes a long way in explaining the funky, organic feel")

91. Beastie Boys, Ill Communication ("That they received adoration from indie kids was hardly surprising, since Ill has fewer explicit hip-hop tracks than alternative songs")

90. Cocoa Brovaz, The Rude Awakening ("Reaffirmed New York as the home of innovative hip-hop in the late '90s")

89. First Down, World Service ("Sadly the public treated it with the kind of contempt only reserved for UK releases… First Down created hip-hop bohemian rhapsodies")

88. Das EFX, Dead Serious ("Whole legions of rappers moved in to bite their style to the extent it quickly became an irritating novelty")

87. The Goats, Tricks of the Shade ("Full of righteous fury bursting through dynamic tunes")

86. KRS-One, Return of the Boom Bap ("No emcee has ever sounded as sure of himself")

85. Lauryn Hill, The Miseducation of Lauryn Hill ("Musical categories are unimportant when records are this accomplished")

84. MC Shan, Down by Law ("The archetypal document of its era")

83. Method Man, Tical ("The brooding darkness, eerie samples and off-key piano tones match Meth's style perfectly")

82. The Notorious B.I.G., Life After Death ("Even with production designed to broaden Biggie's appeal, he couldn't summon much cheer for his lyrics")

81. Organized Konfusion, Stress: The Extinction Agenda ("The mood had clearly darkened and with it the music, the beats, lyrics and flows")

80. Redman, Whut? Thee Album ("His tendency towards the lunatic is evident throughout")

79. Styles of Beyond, 2000 Fold ("Uptempo beats with complex space-age lyrics")

78. The X-Ecutioners, X-Pressions ("Funky enough to make a blind man dance")

77. 2Pac, All Eyez on Me ("Conceived by Death Row as the biggest and grandest gangsta rap album of the '90s")

76. Gang Starr, Hard to Earn ("Guru's simple but devastating flow laid down their hardest lyrics to date")

75. OutKast, Southernplayalisticadillacmuzik ("A southern record that let you feel the sunshine")

74. Wu-Tang Clan, Wu-Tang Forever ("There are inevitably weak moments but any other group would kill for some of the tunes here")

73. Tha Alkaholiks, 21 & Over) ("What a relief to hear a crew doing their own thing when the rest of LA was slavishly copying the gangsta blueprint")

72. Brand Nubian, One for All ("This album was never likely to be forgotten in a hurry")

71. De La Soul, Stakes Is High ("Another rounded collection of fantastic songs that managed to entertain, amuse and provoke in equal measure")

70. Jeru the Damaja, The Sun Rises in the East ("Jeru was not content to let hip-hop languish in its gangsta gutter; he was determined to try and improve it")

69. Pete Rock & CL Smooth, The Main Ingredient ("The delivery was sophisticated and expressive without ever being soft or sentimental")

68. Xzibit, At the Speed of Life ("His mid-paced flows were not obviously west coast, but nor were they influenced by the banging joints emerging from NYC")

67. Common Sense, Resurrection ("Resurrection is a mellow and jazzy set but is never less than funky")

66. DMX, It's Dark and Hell Is Hot ("The latest artist to climb aboard the horrorcore bandwagon, DMX is crazy…")

65. KRS-One, KRS-One ("The Blastmaster still shows no sign of flagging in his determination to rule hip-hop")

64. The Roots, Do You Want More?!!!??! ("For a debut album it showed amazing maturity, especially as they were pioneering the world of live hip-hop")

63. Black Moon, Enta da Stage ("Over tight production, raw beats and rough musical samples came dark raps dealing with the reality of inner city street life")

62. Da Lench Mob, Guerillas in tha Mist ("Their murderous revolutionary ambitions [lined] them up alongside Paris in the controversy stakes")

61. Ice Cube, The Predator ("…captured a historical moment and a musical one – few albums share that unique distinction")

60. Main Source, Breaking Atoms ("The overall modd is fresh and jazzy, and the Large Professor's production is never short of inspired")

59. Redman, Muddy Waters ("Funkier than a room full of the finest cheeba smoke")

58. The Roots, Things Fall Apart ("…contained enough hard hip-hop tunes to keep aficionados of the roughest street sounds happy")

57. Pete Rock & CL Smooth, Mecca and the Soul Brother ("As fine a record as Pete Rock has ever produced")

56. Gravediggaz, Niggamortis ("Niggamortis had enough fine material to carry its weight of doom-laden words")

55. Beastie Boys, Licensed to Ill ("Every fan understood it was all a good joke while older people took it all deadly seriously")

54. Black Star, Mos Def & Talib Kweli Are Black Star ("Every listen to this complex but accessible album reveals new lyrical gems")

53. Cypress Hill, Black Sunday ("…gothic darkness and a cartoonish obsession with smoking dope")

52. Gunshot, Patriot Games ("…warmly received critically, especially by an alternative press thrilled to find a rap record that didn't offend their liberal sensibilities")

51. Jeru the Damaja, Wrath of the Math ("He comes on like the spiritual heir to KRS-One's title of chief edutainer")

50. Wild Style Original Soundtrack ("It captures the spirits of hip-hop's roots (c.1982) and, as such, is a must for all hip-hop fans")

49. Gang Starr, Daily Operation ("A harder sound in keeping with NYC at the time… they're unlikely to surpass this record in a hurry")

48. Ice Cube, AmeriKKKa's Most Wanted ("Ice has never been this angry or this focused since… He made a tighter record than almost everyone else in 1990")

47. Onyx, Bacdafucup ("Bacdafucup has a basic attraction that's still hard to beat")

46. StreetSounds Electro 1-10 ("Any excuse to listen to the computerised beats on these records and relive those moments is a good one")

45. Dianond D & the Psychotic Neurotics, Stunts, Blunts and Hip Hop ("One of hip-hop's great lost records")

44. EPMD, Strictly Business ("Their love for hip-hop as an art form was always clear")

43. A Tribe Called Quest, People's Instinctive Travels and the Paths of Rhythm ("A beautiful set of songs that inspired, amused and touched in equal measures")

42. Big Daddy Kane, Long Live the Kane ("Kane's fearsome reputation is based almost entirely on this record")

41. Soundbombing II ("A perfect demonstration of the wealth of talent at their disposal")

40. Smif-N-Wessun, Dah Shinin' ("A potent cocktail of compressed beats that were springy enough to get necks snapping and heavy lyrics that stayed on the right side of credible")

39. Boogie Down Productions, By All Means Necessary ("The album's success is as much a result of its hard, tight beats as the Blastmaster's lyricism")

38. Beastie Boys, Paul's Boutique ("An entire work of art that would be the bomb if it were released tomorrow and a miracle in the context of 1989")

37. The Roots, Illadelph Halflife ("It showed The Roots were even more innovative than previously thought")

36. The Beatnuts, The Beatnuts ("Hard as nails, straight out of New York and as funny as it was violent… a blast of polluted air from the capital of hip-hop")

35. Jurassic 5, Jurassic 5 ("A great LP conveying the feeling of summer block parties. One for the BBQ")

34. Souls of Mischief, 93 'til Infinity ("Their mellow sound (fairly unique at the time) seemed to match the lyrics and made for a sweet combination")

33. Dr. Octagon, Dr Octagon ("Over crazy, experimental beats (courtesy of The Automator) that are miraculously never less than funky, Keith goes off…")

32. De La Soul, De La Soul Is Dead ("Tunes like 'Millie Pulled a Pistol on Santa' and 'Saturday' [sic] are as good as anything to be found on 3 Feet High and Rising")

31. The Pharcyde, Bizarre Ride II the Pharcyde ("Their songs brought a smile to the faces of everyone who heard them, without ever falling into the realms of novelty")

30. Eric B. & Rakim, Follow the Leader ("It was never going to have quite same impact as their debut [but] would be almost anyone else's best work")

29. Public Enemy, Yo! Bum Rush the Show ("As hard and solid as their uncompromising polemical stance")

28. Run-DMC, Raising Hell ("The finest moment from the godfathers of hip-hop… This record defined its era")

27. Eminem, The Slim Shady LP ("Few albums have featured such crazy raps but retained enough humour and accessibility to be so good")

26. Raekwon, Only Built 4 Cuban Linx... ("What really bursts from the record is the soul inside – its passion is what makes it great")

25. Gang Starr, Step in the Arena ("Premier always let the freedom of jazz inform his production while Guru let its certainty breathe through his delivery")

24. GZA, Liquid Swords ("The Wu's rhyme master giving ample expression to his verbal gifts over RZA beats as tight as any he had produced")

23. Mobb Deep, The Infamous ("Darker than December and littered with off-key piano sounds that chilled the blood")

22. Showbiz and A.G., Runaway Slave ("Real uncut hip-hop from its opening beats to the final rap")

21. Slick Rick, The Great Adventures of Slick Rick ("Funky, funny and endlessly entertaining")

20. Ice-T, O.G. Original Gangster ("The stories are great and Ice's hustler savvy and sophistication burns through every cut")

19. Cypress Hill, Cypress Hill ("Their styles were fresher than good sushi and the murderous stories they recounted a perfect foil to the funky tunes")

18. Canibus, Can-I-Bus ("His power on the mic didn't rely on lyrical conceit or crazy abstraction, just simple force and confident delivery")

17. Company Flow, Funcrusher Plus ("It's too out there, too challenging to the ears, and only with repeated listening does their obtuse funk start to make sense")

16. Public Enemy, Fear of a Black Planet ("Never again would truly political rap reach an audience of this size or produce such a great record")

15. Gang Starr, Moment of Truth ("Despite their vintage they're still making futuristic records that never rely on formula")

14. Gang Starr, Full Clip: A Decade of Gang Starr ("…proves just why Guru's simple flow over Primo's incredible beats is such a potent combination")

13. The Notorious B.I.G., Ready to Die ("His hunger and despair can be heard all over this record")

12. Snoop Doggy Dogg, Doggystyle ("The tunes are still great and the beats bumping")

11. Dr. Dre, The Chronic ("What made the whole trunk-bumping package so great was Dre's production… Hundreds of albums since have tried to bite his style but none have managed it")

10. A Tribe Called Quest, The Low End Theory ("ATCQ came back with something harder, funkier and deeper than their light-hearted debut. It was a brave and bold move")

9. Boogie Down Productions, Criminal Minded ("…boasted lyrics that were always much more conscious than those of their competitors, and the beats broke new ground")

8. A Tribe Called Quest, Midnight Marauders ("Funky, funny, sweet but hard (where necessary) and utterly charming… There isn't a wasted note")

7. Ultramagnetic MCs, Critical Beatdown ("The tight funk-based tracks, the thumping drums and the inspiring selection of samples are perfect")

6. De La Soul, 3 Feet High and Rising ("…took rap somewhere it had never been before and, given the important role De La Soul's naivety played, it was probably an unrepeatable feat")

5. N.W.A, Straight Outta Compton ("Rappers have said many outrageous things on record since it was released, but NWA said it first and did it much better")

4. Eric B. & Rakim, Paid in Full ("Rarely has hip-hop heard an emcee so full of self-belief and with the raw skills to fulfil his boasts")

3. Nas, Illmatic ("Tighter than Lil' Kim's hotpants, there isn't a moment wasted on Illmatic… every track is a classic")

2. Wu-Tang Clan, Enter the Wu-Tang (36 Chambers) ("Their rhymes sounded like true life tales, something the west coast no longer even aspired to, and the passion was perceptible")

1. Public Enemy, It Takes a Nation of Millions to Hold Us Back ("Chuck D recently admitted he set out with the intention of making a record that girls wouldn't like… he undoubtedly succeeded)"
