= Full Clip: A Decade of Gang Starr =

Greatest hits album by Gang Starr
- Released: July 13, 1999
- Recorded: 1989–1999
- Studio: D&D Studios in New York, New York
- Genre: East Coast hip-hop; jazz rap; hardcore hip-hop
- Length: 122:46
- Label: Virgin
- Producer: DJ Premier; Guru

Gang Starr chronology
Moment of Truth (1998)	Full Clip: A Decade of Gang Starr (1999)	The Ownerz (2003)

Professional ratings
Review scores
Source	Rating
AllMusic	4.5/5 stars
Robert Christgau	A−
RapReviews	9.0/10
The Rolling Stone Album Guide	4.5/5 stars

Full Clip: A Decade of Gang Starr is the first compilation album by American hip-hop duo Gang Starr. Released by Virgin Records, the album consists of more than 30 songs recorded between 1989 and 1999. The compilation earned positive reviews from critics and was certified Gold by the RIAA on August 19, 1999, and Silver by the BPI on February 12, 2016.

== Content ==
Full Clip: A Decade of Gang Starr is primarily composed of material from the group's first five studio albums, with one song from No More Mr. Nice Guy, three from Step in the Arena, five from Daily Operation, six from Hard to Earn, and six from Moment of Truth. The compilation also features four songs previously released on singles, four previously released on soundtracks, and four brand new tracks (an album intro and the songs "Full Clip", "Discipline", and "All 4 tha Ca$h"). The Japanese release includes two additional songs taken from Step in the Arena and Daily Operation.

== Critical reception ==
In a contemporary review for The Village Voice, music critic Robert Christgau called Full Clip an ideal compilation album that makes the duo's music seem less formalistic and more diverse: "It's a credit to the duo's constancy that the result plays like a single release."

== Track listing ==
=== Disc one ===
#	Title	Producer(s)	Performer(s)	Original album
1	"Intro"	DJ Premier; Guru		
2	"Full Clip"	DJ Premier; Guru	DJ Premier; Guru	Full Clip
3	"Discipline"	DJ Premier; Guru	Guru; Total	Full Clip
4	"Words I Manifest (Remix)"	DJ Premier; Guru	Guru	No More Mr. Nice Guy
5	"Ex Girl to Next Girl"	DJ Premier; Guru	Guru	Daily Operation
6	"I'm the Man"	DJ Premier; Guru	Guru; Jeru the Damaja; Lil' Dap	Daily Operation
7	"Mass Appeal"	DJ Premier; Guru	Guru	Hard to Earn
8	"Jazz Thing (Video Mix)"	DJ Premier; Guru	Guru	Mo' Better Blues OST
9	"The Militia"	DJ Premier; Guru	Guru; Big Shug; Freddie Foxxx	Moment of Truth
10	"Tonz 'O' Gunz"	DJ Premier; Guru	Guru	Hard to Earn
11	"Royalty"	DJ Premier; Guru	Guru; K-Ci & JoJo	Moment of Truth
12	"Who's Gonna Take the Weight?"	DJ Premier; Guru	Guru	Step in the Arena
13	"You Know My Steez"	DJ Premier; Guru	Guru	Moment of Truth
14	"Above the Clouds"	DJ Premier; Guru	Guru; Inspectah Deck	Moment of Truth
15	"Just to Get a Rep" (12" version)	DJ Premier; Guru	Guru	Step in the Arena
16	"DWYCK"	DJ Premier; Guru	Guru; Nice & Smooth	Hard to Earn

=== Disc two ===
#	Title	Producer(s)	Performer(s)	Original album
1	"All 4 tha Ca$h"	DJ Premier; Guru	Guru	Full Clip
2	"Step in the Arena"	DJ Premier; Guru	Guru	Step in the Arena
3	"Work"	DJ Premier; Guru	Guru	Moment of Truth
4	"Soliloquy of Chaos"	DJ Premier; Guru	Guru	Daily Operation
5	"Take It Personal"	DJ Premier; Guru	Guru	Daily Operation
6	"Speak Ya Clout"	DJ Premier; Guru	Guru; Jeru the Damaja; Lil' Dap	Hard to Earn
7	"Gotta Get Over (Taking Loot)"	DJ Premier; Guru	Guru	Trespass OST
8	"1/2 & 1/2"	DJ Premier; Guru; M.O.P.	Guru; M.O.P.	Blade OST
9	"The ? Remainz"	DJ Premier; Guru	Guru	Suckas Need Bodyguards single
10	"Code of the Streets"	Guru; DJ Premier	Guru	Hard to Earn
11	"So Wassup?!"	DJ Premier; Guru	Guru	You Know My Steez single
12	"Now You're Mine"	DJ Premier; Guru	Guru	Hard to Earn
13	"Betrayal"	DJ Premier; Guru	Guru; Scarface	Moment of Truth
14	"B.Y.S."	DJ Premier; Guru	Guru	Daily Operation
15	"Credit Is Due"	DJ Premier; Guru	Guru	Love Sick single
16	"The Militia II (Remix)"	DJ Premier; Guru	Guru; WC; Rakim	Belly OST
17	"You Know My Steez (Three Men and a Lady Remix)"	DJ Premier; Guru	Guru; The Lady of Rage; Kurupt	The Militia single

Japanese edition bonus tracks

#	Title	Producer(s)	Performer(s)	Original album
18	"Take Two and Pass"	DJ Premier; Guru	Guru	Daily Operation
19	"As I Read My S-A"	DJ Premier; Guru	Guru	Step In The Arena

== Album singles ==
Single information
"Full Clip"
- Released: June 8, 1999
- B-side: "DWYCK"
"Discipline"
- Released: 1999
- B-side: "Just to Get a Rep"
"Full Clip (Remix)"
- Released: 1999 [White Label]
- B-side: "Work (Remix)"

== Charts ==
Chart (1999)	Peak position
Dutch Albums (Album Top 100)	55
French Albums (SNEP)	169
German Albums (Offizielle Top 100)	48
Swedish Albums (Sverigetopplistan)	47
UK Albums (OCC)	47
UK R&B Albums (OCC)	10
US Billboard 200	33
US Top R&B/Hip-Hop Albums (Billboard)	11

== Certifications ==
Region	Certification	Certified units/sales
United Kingdom (BPI)	Silver	60,000^{‡}
United States (RIAA)	Gold	500,000^{^}
^{^} Shipments figures based on certification alone.^{‡} Sales+streaming figures based on certification alone.
