= Mass Appeal: the Best of Gang Starr =

Mass Appeal: The Best of Gang Starr

Greatest hits album by Gang Starr
- Released: December 26, 2006
- Recorded: 1989–2003
- Genre: East Coast hip-hop; jazz rap; hardcore hip-hop
- Length: 71:57
- Label: Virgin; EMI 7243 5 96708 2 9 V2-96708
- Producer: DJ Premier; Guru

Gang Starr chronology
The Ownerz (2003)	Mass Appeal: The Best of Gang Starr (2006)	One of the Best Yet (2019)

Professional ratings
Review scores
Source	Rating
AllMusic	4/5 stars
Pitchfork	9.0/10

Mass Appeal: The Best of Gang Starr is the second greatest hits album by American hip-hop duo Gang Starr, released by Virgin/EMI Records on December 26, 2006. It is named after the popular Gang Starr song "Mass Appeal," which is one of the eighteen tracks on the album.

== Content ==
Mass Appeal: Best of Gang Starr differs from the group's first greatest hits compilation, Full Clip: A Decade of Gang Starr, because it contains a bonus disc of music videos and tracks from the group's sixth studio album,The Ownerz. The limited-edition version of this album contains two bonus tracks on the first disc and a bonus disc with 11 music videos in DVD format. The tracks on disc one are not arranged in chronological order but are taken from every Gang Starr album released up until their breakup. The music videos are arranged in chronological order and taken from all Gang Starr albums excluding No More Mr. Nice Guy and One of the Best Yet. There are no previously unreleased tracks on Mass Appeal, but there are two bonus tracks which previously appeared on the Japanese version of The Ownerz.

== Track listing ==
=== Disc 1 ===
1. "Manifest"
2. "Step In The Arena"
3. "Put Up Or Shut Up" (featuring Krumbsnatcha)
4. "Skills"
5. "Code Of The Streets"
6. "Ex Girl To Next Girl"
7. "Soliloquy Of Chaos"
8. "The Militia" (featuring Big Shug & Freddie Foxxx)
9. "Above The Clouds" (featuring Inspectah Deck)
10. "Check The Technique"
11. "Royalty" (featuring K-Ci & JoJo)
12. "Lovesick"
13. "Take It Personal"
14. "Now You're Mine"
15. "Just To Get A Rep" (Short Version)
16. "B.Y.S."
17. "Mass Appeal"
18. "DWYCK" (featuring Nice & Smooth)
19. "Natural" (Bonus Track)
20. "Tha Squeeze" (Bonus Track)

=== Limited Edition DVD ===
1. "Step In the Arena"
2. "Just to Get a Rep"
3. "Ex Girl to Next Girl"
4. "Take It Personal"
5. "Code of the Streets"
6. "Mass Appeal"
7. "The Militia"
8. "Full Clip"
9. "Discipline" (featuring Total)
10. "Nice Girl, Wrong Place"
11. "Skillz"
