= Dwyck =

1992 single by Gang Starr featuring Nice & Smooth

Single by Gang Starr featuring Nice & Smooth

from the album Hard to Earn
- A-side: "Take It Personal"
- Released: December 29, 1992
- Recorded: 1992
- Genre: Hip hop
- Length: 4:03
- Label: Chrysalis; EMI
- Songwriter(s): Christopher Martin; Keith Elam; Gregory Mays; Darryl Barnes
- Producer(s): DJ Premier

Gang Starr singles chronology
"Gotta Get Over (Taking Loot)" (1992)	"Dwyck" (1992)	"Mass Appeal" (1994)

Nice & Smooth singles chronology
"How to Flow" (1991)	"Dwyck" (1992)	"Old to the New" (1994)

Music video
- "DWYCK" on YouTube

"Dwyck" (stylized in all caps) is a song by American hip hop duo Gang Starr, released in 1992 as the lead single from their fourth studio album Hard to Earn (1994). It features American hip hop duo Nice & Smooth. The song samples "Synthetic Substitution" by Melvin Bliss, "Funky for You" and "No Bones in Ice Cream" by Nice & Smooth, and "Step in the Arena" by Gang Starr.

== Background ==
After Gang Starr worked with Nice & Smooth on the song "Down the Line", the latter collaborated the former to return a favor. They recorded "Dwyck" in a two-day session, during which rappers WC and Don Barron (from the hip hop group Masters of Ceremony) were also present. At the time, the artists thought Guru's verse was the weakest. DJ Premier recalled that on the first day, Smooth B recorded 20 takes of the line "Yo Keithy E, I left my Phillie at home, do you have another?" The next day, he performed his verse in one take.

"Dwyck" was originally the B-side to "Take It Personal" by Gang Starr. Gang Starr did not expect the song to become as popular as it did. They remastered the song, and added the new version to their album Daily Operation at the request of Chrysalis Records. However, the label reneged on their promise to re-release the album, which was problematic as people were only buying Daily Operation for "Dwyck". Gang Starr eventually included the song in Hard to Earn so it would still appear on one of their albums.

The title of the song originated from a trending joke started by rapper Biz Markie, in which a person would attract someone else's attention and show themselves grabbing their penis while saying "Dwyck!"

== Critical reception ==
Tom Doggett of RapReviews considered "Dwyck" the best song from Hard to Earn and "one of the truly great party starters from the early nineties". He further wrote of the song, "The stripped-down production consists of only drums and a bassline, which allows the artists to take the spotlight in each verse, which they do. Smooth B's subdued rhymes in the third verse stand out the most, though Greg Nice and Guru do their thing as well. The most unforgettable part of the song, though, is Primo's turntable wizardry between verses, a breathtaking display from a true master."

== Charts ==
Chart (1994)	Peak position
US Bubbling Under R&B/Hip-Hop Singles (Billboard)	7
US Hot Rap Songs (Billboard)	25
