= Livin' Proof =

Studio album by Group Home
- Released: November 21, 1995
- Recorded: 1994–95
- Studio: D&D Studios (New York, NY)
- Genre: Hip hop
- Length: 49:12
- Label: Payday; FFRR
- Producer: Gang Starr (also exec.); Big Jaz

Group Home chronology
Livin' Proof (1995)	A Tear for the Ghetto (1999)

Singles from Livin' Proof
- 1. "Supa Star" Released: September 15, 1994; 2. "Livin' Proof" Released: September 7, 1995; 3. "Suspended in Time" Released: March 26, 1996

Professional ratings
Review scores
Source	Rating
AllMusic	4/5 stars
Muzik	4.5/5 stars
RapReviews	7.5/10
The Source	3.5/5 stars

Livin' Proof is the debut studio album by the American hip hop duo Group Home. It was released on November 21, 1995, through FFRR/Payday Records. Recording sessions took place at D&D Studios in New York. Production was handled by Gang Starr and Big Jaz. It features guest appearances from Absaloot, Big Shug, Guru, Brainsick Enterprize and Smiley the Ghetto Child.

It featured the popular underground single "Supa Star", which peaked at number 85 on the Billboard Hot 100 in the United States. The album is known both for the instrumentals and the interplay between the lyrics of Lil' Dap and Melachi the Nutcracker.

== Track listing ==
No.	Title	Writer(s)	Producer(s)	Length
1.	"Intro"	James Heath; Jamal Felder; Chris Martin	DJ Premier	0:48
2.	"Inna City Life"	Heath; Felder; Martin	DJ Premier	2:58
3.	"Livin' Proof"	Heath; Felder; Martin	DJ Premier	4:15
4.	"Serious Rap Shit" (featuring Guru and Big Shug)	Keith Elam; Heath; Felder; C. Guy	Guru	4:14
5.	"Suspended in Time"	Heath; Felder; Martin	DJ Premier	4:34
6.	"Sacrifice" (featuring Absaloot)	Felder; Martin	DJ Premier	3:26
7.	"Up Against the Wall" (Low Budget Mix)	Heath; Felder; Martin	DJ Premier	4:34
8.	"4 Give My Sins"	Felder; Heath; J. Burks	Big Jaz	3:25
9.	"Baby Pa"	Heath; Martin; Bob James	DJ Premier	3:12
10.	"2 Thousand"	Heath; Felder; Martin; Isaac Hayes	DJ Premier	3:18
11.	"Supa Star"	Felder; Heath; Martin	DJ Premier	5:22
12.	"Up Against the Wall" (Getaway Car Mix)	Heath; Felder; Martin	DJ Premier	4:34
13.	"Tha Realness" (featuring Smiley the Ghetto Child and Brainsick Enterprize)	D. Cruz; Heath; A. Demsey; D. Wood; Martin	DJ Premier	4:32
Total length:				49:12

Netherlands Bonus Track
No.	Title	Writer(s)	Producer(s)	Length
14.	"So Called Friends"	Heath; Felder; Elam	Guru

Notes

- Track 5 features additional vocals from Jeru the Damaja

Sample credits

- "Intro" contains samples from "Yesterday" by Wes Montgomery and "Ain't No Half Steppin'" by Big Daddy Kane.
- "Inna Citi Life" contains samples from "Nautilus" by Bob James, "Cold Duck Time" by Les McCann and Eddie Harris, and "Serious (Ceereeus BDP Remix)" by Steady B.
- "Serious Rap Shit" contains samples from "Birdland" by Weather Report, "In Our Lifetime" by Marvin Gaye, and "I Ain't Goin' Out Like That" by Cypress Hill.
- "Suspended in Time" contains samples from "Pipeline" by The Incredible Bongo Band, "Touch Me (All Night Long)" by Fonda Rae and Wish, "Real Hip Hop" by Das EFX, and "Da Mystery of Chessboxin'" by Wu-Tang Clan.
- "Sacrifice" contains samples from "What Do I Wish For?" by The Chi-Lites, "Breakthrough" by Isaac Hayes, and "Crack Featuring Pete the Fly" by Paul Mooney.
- "Up Against the Wall (Low Budget Mix)" contains samples from "Windows of the World" by Isaac Hayes.
- "Livin' Proof" contains samples from "Collage" by The Ramsey Lewis Trio and "C.R.E.A.M." by Wu-Tang Clan.
- "Baby Pa" contains samples from "The Golden Apple" by Bob James.
- "2 Thousand" contains samples from "I Feel Like Loving You Today" written by Isaac Hayes and performed by Donald Byrd.
- "Supa Star" contains samples from "Hanging Downtown" by Cameo, "Funky President (People It's Bad)" by James Brown, "One Woman" by Isaac Hayes, "Words from the Nutcracker" and "I'm the Man" both by Gang Starr, "I Got It Made" by Special Ed, and "Who's Gonna Love You" by Muscle Shoals Horns.

== Personnel ==
- James "Lil' Dap" Heath – performer (tracks: 2–5, 7–14)
- Jamal "Melachi the Nutcracker" Felder – performer (tracks: 2–8, 10–12, 14)
- Keith "GuRu" Elam – performer (track 4), producer (tracks: 4, 14), executive producer
- Cary "Big Shug" Guy – performer (track 4)
- Absaloot – performer (track 6)
- D. "Smiley the Ghetto Child" Cruz – performer (track 13)
- D. "Jack the Ripper" Wood & A. "Blackstarr" Demsey (Brainsick Enterprize) – performer (track 13)
- Kendrick "Jeru the Damaja" Davis – backing vocals (track 5)
- Christopher "DJ Premier" Martin – producer (tracks: 1–3, 5–7, 9–13), mixing (tracks: 1–8, 10–14), executive producer
- Jonathan "Big Jaz" Burks – producer & mixing (track 8)
- Eddie Sancho – engineering
- Dexter Thibou – assistant engineering
- Luis Tineo – assistant engineering
- Tony Dawsey – mastering
- Gregory Burke – design
- Daniel Hastings – photography

== Album chart positions ==
Chart (1995)	Peak position
US Top R&B/Hip-Hop Albums (Billboard)	34

== Singles chart positions ==
Year	Song	Chart positions			
Year	Song	Billboard Hot 100	Hot R&B/Hip-Hop Singles & Tracks	Hot Rap Singles	Hot Dance Music/Maxi-Singles Sales
1994	"Supa Star"	85	85	19	8
1994	"Livin' Proof"	-	-	26	5
1995	"Suspended In Time"	-	82	34	10
