= Cyrus Da Virus =

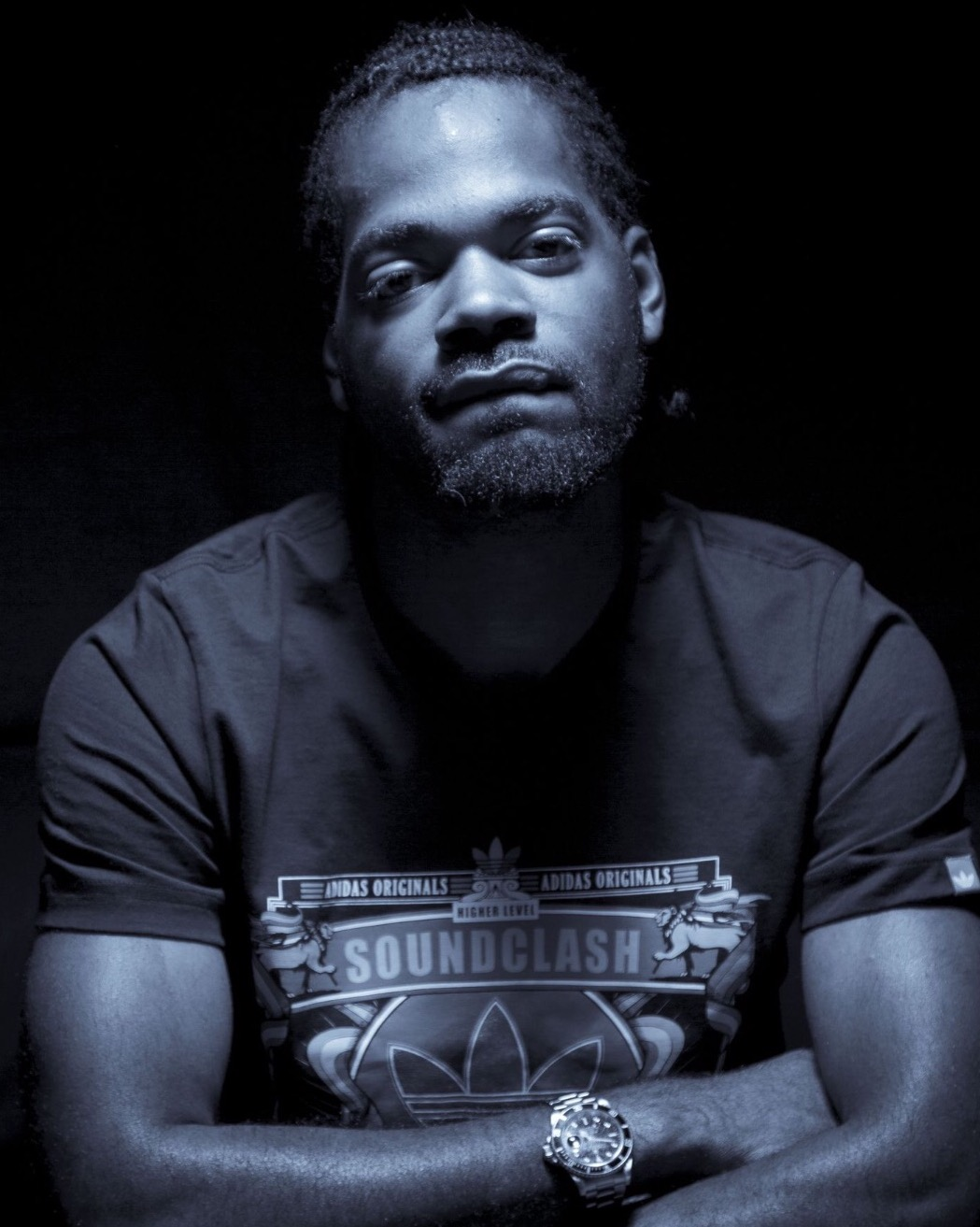

Background information
- Origin: Leytonstone, London
- Genres: Hip hop
- Occupations: Vocalist, rapper, producer, songwriter
- Instruments: Vocals, rapping
- Years active: 1995–present
- Labels: Cy-Fi Recordings, BMU
- Website: cyrusdavirus.weebly.com

Cyrus Mchardy, better known as Cyrus Da Virus, is an English rapper. Cyrus was born on 22 November 1979 in Leytonstone, East London. He relocated to south London in his late teens.

== Career ==
Initially a battle rapper, Cyrus competed in various local competitions and open mic events. His debut album "what do you know about Cyrus" was released in 1999 and funded by The Prince's Trust.

This album was produced by "J crux" at a time when underground UK hip hop artists were rare. The album was critically acclaimed and received airplay and reviews from major radio stations and music journals including Tim Westwood (BBC Radio 1) and Hip Hop Connection magazine (HHC), which described it as "innovative".

The Prince's Trust also helped Cyrus complete a music technology diploma and set up an independent record label, Cy-FI Recordings.

The follow-up album Eclipse was released in 2004 and advertised and distributed online. Four years later, Cyrus released his third album 29 years in the Making. This album, unlike the previous two, had several producers with different styles. It featured fellow UK hip hop singers "Sir Ster" and "MR North". Cyrus also teamed up with soul singer-songwriter "Tamsin Soul". This album was reviewed in the Source magazine and nominated for an award in 2010 at the MMF in Miami, Florida.

In 2012, Cyrus released "The spliff Tapes" mixtape. The project was a joint venture with French hip hop artist Ichelmee". They worked alongside Kulture Black" who recorded and engineered the mixtape. It was featured and reviewed by hip hop blogs such as "The Grime Report", datpiff, Hip Hop DX, hiphoplifeandtimes.com, 2dopeboyz, Suspect Packages, UK All Day and UKHh.com. The videos were directed and produced by 'Toxic TV" and 'Rap City TV". The remix of Pharoahe Monch & Styles P's smash hit "The Life" (My life) video received over 230,000 views on YouTube.

== Albums ==
- What Do U Know About Cyrus (1999)
- Eclipse (2004)
- 29 Years in the Making (2009)

== Mixtapes ==
- The Spliff Tapes (2012)
