= One of the Best Yet =

Studio album by Gang Starr
- Released: November 1, 2019
- Recorded: 2005–09 (Guru's vocals); 2011–19 (production, guest vocals & mixing)
- Genre: Hip-hop
- Length: 37:03
- Label: To the Top; Gang Starr; INgrooves
- Producer: DJ Premier (also exec.)

Gang Starr chronology
Mass Appeal: the Best of Gang Starr (2006)	One of the Best Yet (2019)

Singles from One of the Best Yet
- 1. "Family & Loyalty" Released: September 20, 2019; 2. "Bad Name" Released: October 18, 2019

One of the Best Yet is the seventh and final studio album by American hip-hop duo Gang Starr, released on November 1, 2019. The album features previously unreleased and posthumous vocals from Guru, who died nine years prior to the album's release. The album features guest appearances from J. Cole, Royce da 5'9", Talib Kweli, M.O.P., and Q-Tip, among others.

== Background ==
Rapper Guru died of cancer in April 2010, having not released an album with DJ Premier as Gang Starr since 2003's The Ownerz, seven years earlier. A note from Guru provided by former collaborator Solar had said that he disowned his former producer and DJ, and was released around the time of his death. However, many looked on it with suspicion. While Guru and Premier had not spoken since 2004, Premier had wanted to release a final album, but had difficulty obtaining unreleased material from Guru, despite the rapper's prolific work ethic, because of a dispute with fellow producer Solar. In 2014, a court case gave Guru's family control of his own unreleased music, and in 2016, Solar decided to sell the remaining music. Despite the animosity between the two men, an agreement was reached (although Solar disputes this), and in early 2018, DJ Premier decided to put together a final album, creating new beats for the project over acappellas from Guru.

== Critical reception ==
Professional ratings
Aggregate scores
Source	Rating
Metacritic	71/100
Review scores
Source	Rating
Consequence of Sound	B−
Exclaim!	9/10
The Guardian	4/5 stars
HipHopDX	4.2/5
NME	3/5 stars
Pitchfork	6.3/10
PopMatters	7/10
Rolling Stone	3.5/5 stars

One of the Best Yet received generally favorable reviews. At Metacritic, which assigns a normalized rating out of 100 to reviews from mainstream publications, the album received an average score of 71, based on 12 reviews. Writing for Exclaim!, Riley Wallace praised the album as "a fluid, impeccably produced final goodbye" to Guru, and "a last curtain to a legacy group on its own terms." Christopher R. Weingarten of Rolling Stone noted that "there are moments where it feels like one of the most beloved rap groups in history are picking up right where they left off", hailing "Family and Loyalty" as the highlight of the album. Will Lavin of NME called it "a special moment for hip-hop", however, he stated that "Sometimes, too, Guru's absence is a little too noticeable", noting that some tracks sound unfinished.

== Track listing ==
All tracks produced by DJ Premier.

No.	Title	Length
1.	"The Sure Shot" (Intro)	1:23
2.	"Lights Out" (featuring M.O.P.)	3:36
3.	"Bad Name"	2:21
4.	"Hit Man" (featuring Q-Tip)	2:22
5.	"What's Real" (featuring Group Home and Royce da 5'9")	3:24
6.	"Keith Casim Elam" (Interlude)	0:16
7.	"From a Distance" (featuring Jeru the Damaja)	2:30
8.	"Family and Loyalty" (featuring J. Cole)	4:34
9.	"Get Together" (featuring Ne-Yo and Nitty Scott)	3:28
10.	"NYGz / GS 183rd" (Interlude)	1:10
11.	"So Many Rappers"	2:11
12.	"Business or Art" (featuring Talib Kweli)	2:59
13.	"Bring It Back Here"	0:50
14.	"One of the Best Yet (Big Shug Interlude)"	0:28
15.	"Take Flight (Militia, Pt. 4)" (featuring Big Shug and Freddie Foxxx)	2:56
16.	"Bless the Mic"	2:35
Total length:		37:03

== Charts ==
Sales chart performance for One of the Best Yet
Chart (2019)	Peak position
Australian Albums (ARIA)	155
Belgian Albums (Ultratop Flanders)	164
Canadian Albums (Billboard)	65
Dutch Albums (Album Top 100)	86
German Albums (Offizielle Top 100)	46
Swiss Albums (Schweizer Hitparade)	20
US Billboard 200	82
US Top R&B/Hip-Hop Albums (Billboard)	42

== See also ==
- List of 2020 albums
