= 1/2 & 1/2 =

Single by Gang Starr featuring M.O.P.

from the album Blade: Music from and Inspired by the Motion Picture & Full Clip: A Decade of Gang Starr
- B-side: "Gangsta Bounce" - Wolfpak
- Released: August 4, 1998
- Studio: D&D (New York City)
- Genre: Hardcore hip hop, East Coast hip hop
- Length: 4:17
- Songwriters: Keith Elam, Christopher Martin, Jamal Grinnage, Eric Murray
- Producer: DJ Premier

"1/2 & 1/2" is a single by Gang Starr (feat. M.O.P.), taken from the soundtrack album Blade: Music from and Inspired by the Motion Picture, although it was not featured in the film itself. The song was later included on Gang Starr's album Full Clip: A Decade of Gang Starr. The track features samples from Jimmy Webb's "Gymnast's Ballet (Fingerpainting)", Mobb Deep's "Survival of the Fittest", M.O.P.'s "New Jack City", and Brother Arthur's "What You Gonna Do".

The B-side to the single was "Gangsta Bounce" by Wolfpak.

== Track listing ==
US CD

1. "1/2 & 1/2" (Clean Radio) - Gang Starr
2. "1/2 & 1/2" (Street) - Gang Starr
3. "1/2 & 1/2" (Instrumental) - Gang Starr
4. "Gangsta Bounce" - Wolfpak (5:27)
