= Blade (soundtrack) =

1998 film soundtrack

Blade: Music from and Inspired by the Motion Picture

Soundtrack album by various artists
- Released: August 25, 1998
- Recorded: 1998
- Genres: Electronic music; hip hop
- Length: 73:51
- Labels: TVT; Epic
- Producers: Wesley Snipes (exec.); GangStarr; KLC; Nashiem Myrick

Singles from Blade
- 1. "Wrek Tha Discotek" Released: 1998; 2. "Reservations" Released: 1998; 3. "Deadly Zone" Released: 1998; 4. "1/2 & 1/2" Released: August 4, 1998

Professional ratings
Review scores
Source	Rating
AllMusic	3/5 stars

Blade: Music from and Inspired by the Motion Picture is the soundtrack to Stephen Norrington's 1998 film Blade. It was released on August 25, 1998, through TVT Soundtrax/Epic Records, and featured a wide range of musical genres including hip hop, techno, electronic and alternative rock.

The album reached #36 on the Billboard 200 in the United States and #16 on the Top 100 Albums in Germany. It spawned four singles: "Wrek Tha Discotek", "Reservations", "Deadly Zone" and "1/2 & 1/2". "Wrek Tha Discotek" peaked at #42 on the Hot Dance Music/Club Play chart in the US. The album was certified Gold by the Recording Industry Association of America on May 19, 1999, for sales of over 500,000 copies.

== Blade: Music from and Inspired by the Motion Picture ==
=== Track listing ===
No.	Title	Writer(s)	Producer(s)	Length
1.	"The Edge of the Blade" (performed by Mystikal)	M. Tyler; C. Lawson	KLC; Master P (exec.)	4:12
2.	"1/2 & 1/2" (performed by Gang Starr and M.O.P.)	K. Elam; J. Grinnage; E. Murray; C. Martin	DJ Premier; Guru; M.O.P. (co.)	4:17
3.	"Blade" (performed by KRS-One and Channel Live)	L. Parker; H. Green; V. Morgan		3:11
4.	"Fightin' a War" (performed by Down 2 Earth and Rome)	J. Woods; A. McKnight; E. Allen; N. Cruise		4:01
5.	"Reservations" (performed by P.A.)	J. Hollins; K. Prather; M. Sinclair		4:26
6.	"Gangsta Bounce" (performed by Wolfpak (Chief Headhunter, Mr Po-Flip and Slip-Roc))	A. Clark; H. Vasquez		5:27
7.	"Things Ain't the Same" (performed by Kasino)	K. Davis; D. Blackman; S. Bouchet		4:33
8.	"Deadly Zone" (performed by Bounty Killer, Mobb Deep and Big Noyd)	R. Price; T. Perry; A. Johnson; K. Muchita; N. Myrick	Nashiem Myrick	5:00
9.	"Blade 4 Glory" (performed by Majesty and Bizzy Bone)	B. McCane II; Cedric Feaster Jr.; N. Crow		3:45
10.	"Strictly Business (Mantronik MBA Radio Edit)" (performed by Mantronik and EPMD)	E. Sermon; P. Smith; R. Marley		3:36
11.	"Wrek Tha Discotek" (performed by Roger Sanchez and Soulson)	R. Sanchez		6:13
12.	"Confusion (Pump Panel Reconstruction Mix)" (performed by New Order)	A. Baker; B. Sumner; G. Gilbert; P. Hook; S. Morris		10:12
13.	"Playing with Lightning" (performed by Expansion Union)	C.Parker; G. Rodriguez; J. Bernard		4:31
14.	"Dig This Vibe" (performed by DJ Krush)	H. Ishi		4:54
15.	"Dealing with the Roster" (performed by Junkie XL)	T. Holkenborg; P. Tilon		5:33

== Charts ==
Chart (1998)	Peak position
Canada Top Albums/CDs (RPM)	30
German Albums (Offizielle Top 100)	16
US Billboard 200	36
US Top R&B/Hip-Hop Albums (Billboard)	28

== Certifications ==
Region	Certification	Certified units/sales
United Kingdom (BPI)	Gold	100,000^{*}
United States (RIAA)	Gold	500,000^{^}
^{*} Sales figures based on certification alone.^{^} Shipments figures based on certification alone.

== Blade: Original Motion Picture Score ==
Blade: Original Motion Picture Score

Film score by Mark Isham
- Released: September 8, 1998
- Studios: Newman Scoring Stage, Twentieth Century Fox
- Genre: Ambient music
- Length: 33:21
- Label: Varèse Sarabande
- Producers: Robert Townson (exec.); Mark Isham

Mark Isham chronology
Last Dance (Music from the Motion Picture) (1996)	Blade: Original Motion Picture Score (1998)	Afterglow (Music from the Motion Picture) (1998)

Professional ratings
Review scores
Source	Rating
AllMusic	2.5/5 stars
Filmtracks.com	2/5 stars

Blade: Original Motion Picture Score is an instrumental film score composed by Mark Isham, performed by the Hollywood Studio Symphony and conducted by Kenneth Kugler, which was released on September 8, 1998, through Varèse Sarabande. Recording sessions took place at Newman Scoring Stage, 20th Century Fox.

Isham's score album won the 1999 ASCAP Film and Television Music Award in the category "Top Box Office Films".

=== Track listing ===
All music is composed by Mark Isham.

No.	Title	Length
1.	"Intruder"	4:52
2.	"Daywalker"	4:10
3.	"Somebody's Gonna Take You Out"	1:40
4.	"Top of the Food Chain"	3:47
5.	"Temple of Light"	6:14
6.	"The Bleeding Stone"	9:42
7.	"The Blood God"	2:56
Total length:		33:21

Notes

- Track 2 incorporates "Rainbow Voice" from Hearing Solar Winds (1983), courtesy of David Hykes and OCORA Radio France.
