= Code of the Streets (disambiguation) =

Code of the Streets may refer to:

- Code of the Streets, a 1939 film
- "Code of the Streets" (song), a song by Gang Starr
- "Code of the Streets" (Luke Cage), an episode of Luke Cage
