= Code of the Streets (song) =

1994 single by Gang Starr

Single by Gang Starr

from the album Hard to Earn
- B-side: "Speak Ya Clout"
- Released: May 17, 1994
- Recorded: 1992
- Genre: Hip hop
- Length: 3:29
- Label: Chrysalis; EMI
- Songwriters: Christopher Martin; Keith Elam
- Producer: DJ Premier

Gang Starr singles chronology
"Mass Appeal" (1994)	"Code of the Streets" (1994)	"Suckas Need Bodyguards" (1994)

Music video
- "Code of the Streets" on YouTube

"Code of the Streets" is a song by American hip hop duo Gang Starr from their fourth studio album Hard to Earn (1994). It was released as the third single from the album in 1994. It samples "Little Green Apples" by Monk Higgins, "Synthetic Substitution" by Melvin Bliss and "Word From Our Sponsor" by Boogie Down Productions.

== Background ==
"Code of the Streets" evolved from a 1992 song titled "Wrongs of the World", which was produced by Guru and featured in an investigative report on WWOR-TV called Crime Chronicles. When Gang Starr was working on Hard to Earn, DJ Premier asked Guru if they owned the rights to the song as he believed it would be a suitable addition for the album. The original version contained horns and a slightly different drum pattern, but still used the same lyrics. Guru changed the title to "Code of The Streets". For this reason, Premier remade the production of the song to create a "morse code type scratch"; he has stated, "I reprogrammed the drums with just a little bit more of a skip, the way I do it, and you can tell a difference when you hear the Gang Starr version."

== Composition ==
The instrumental contains "somber" strings, while lyrically Guru focuses on behavior in the streets and ghetto and comments on the state of the society.

== Critical reception ==
Jason Birchmeier of AllMusic regarded "Code of the Streets" (along with the song "Tonz 'O' Gunz") as the best moments on Hard to Earn, describing them as "two songs where Guru offers the type of social commentary that made Gang Starr so admirable in the first place." Tom Doggett of RapReviews praised the song's production for "breathtaking work on the turntables."

== Charts ==
Chart (1994)	Peak position
UK Singles (OCC)	91
US Bubbling Under Hot 100 (Billboard)	23
US Hot R&B/Hip-Hop Songs (Billboard)	83
US Hot Rap Songs (Billboard)	33
