= A Tear for the Ghetto =

Studio album by Group Home
- Released: June 1, 1999
- Recorded: 1998–1999 (Run for Your Life in 1995)
- Genre: Hip-hop
- Length: 1:13:18
- Label: Replay
- Producer: Agallah; Alchemist; All The King's Men; Buggy Eye; Charlie Marotta; DJ Premier; DJ Rad; Jiv Pos; Lil' Dap

Group Home chronology
Livin' Proof (1995)	A Tear for the Ghetto (1999)	Where Back (2008)

Professional ratings
Review scores
Source	Rating
AllMusic	3/5 stars

A Tear for the Ghetto is the second studio album by American hip-hop duo Group Home. It was released in 1999 via Replay Records. Production was handled by Agallah, Alchemist, All The King's Men, Buggy Eye, Charlie Marotta, DJ Premier, DJ Rad, Jiv Pos, and group member Lil' Dap. It features guest appearances from GuRu, Agallah, Blackadon, Brainsick Enterprize, Kai:Bee, Nikki Bonds, Steph Lova, Mike Epps and Dominique Witten.

The album contained one charted single, "Make It In Life", which made it to number 16 on the US Billboard Hot Rap Singles chart.

== Critical reception ==
Exclaim! wrote that the "production from Agallah and the Alchemist among others [provides] a low-slung minimalism that connects favourably with Lil’ Dap’s improved flow and lyrics concerning his low budget environment."

== Track listing ==
No.	Title	Writer(s)	Producer(s)	Length
1.	"Tear Shit Down"	James Heath; Jamal Felder; Angel Aguilar	Agallah	3:31
2.	"Da Real GH / Interlude"	Heath; Felder; Charles Marotta	Charlie Marotta	4:06
3.	"Stupid Muthafuckers (30 Minutes to War)"	Heath; Felder; Alan Maman	Alchemist	4:37
4.	"Street Life"	Heath; Felder	Lil' Dap	1:57
5.	"Sun for a Reason"	Heath; Felder; A. Demsey; Conrad Almonacy	DJ Rad	4:04
6.	"The Legacy"	Heath; Keith Elam; Chris Martin	DJ Premier	4:01
7.	"Run for Your Life"	Heath; Felder; K. Thomas; Aguilar	Agallah	4:21
8.	"Make It in Life"	Heath; Felder; Aguilar	Agallah	4:42
9.	"A Train X-Press"	Heath; Felder; Almonacy	DJ Rad	3:50
10.	"Be Like That / Interlude"	Heath; Felder; Elam; Thomas	Agallah	4:40
11.	"Dial-A-Thug"	Heath; Thomas; Demsey	DJ Rad	3:51
12.	"Politic All Night"	Heath	Lil' Dap	1:22
13.	"Keep Rising"	Heath; Demsey; Dwayne Wood	Lil' Dap	4:23
14.	"We Can Do This"	Heath; Jean Claude Louhisdon	Jiv Pos	3:37
15.	"12 O'Clock"	Heath; Nikki Bonds; A. West	All The King's Men	4:09
16.	"Oh Sweet America"	Heath; Felder; Aguilar	Agallah	3:59
17.	"Breaker 1-9 / Interlude"	Heath; Felder; K. Grammer; Greg Desilus	Buggy Eye	3:12
18.	"Beefin' for Rap"	Heath; Felder; Stephanie Saunders; Aguilar	Agallah	2:38
19.	"Game Recognize Game"	Heath; Felder; Marotta	Charlie Marotta	1:42
20.	"Life Ain't Shit"	Heath; Felder	Charlie Marotta	4:36
Total length:				1:13:18
