= The Ownerz =

Studio album by Gang Starr
- Released: June 24, 2003
- Recorded: 2002–2003
- Studios: D&D, New York City; Avatar, New York City
- Genres: East Coast hip-hop; underground hip-hop; jazz rap; hardcore hip-hop
- Length: 57:04
- Labels: Virgin; EMI 7243 5 80247 0 8 V0-80247
- Producers: DJ Premier; Guru

Gang Starr chronology
Full Clip: A Decade of Gang Starr (1999)	The Ownerz (2003)	Mass Appeal: the Best of Gang Starr (2006)

Singles from The Ownerz
- 1. "Skills" Released: November 5, 2002; 2. "Nice Girl Wrong Place" Released: April 8, 2003; 3. "The Ownerz" Released: September 30, 2003

Professional ratings
Aggregate scores
Source	Rating
Metacritic	70/100
Review scores
Source	Rating
AllMusic	4.5/5 stars
HipHopDX	4/5 stars
Muzik	4/5 stars
Pitchfork	7.5/10
RapReviews	9/10
Rolling Stone	3/5 stars
The New Rolling Stone Album Guide	3.5/5 stars
The Source	4/5 stars
Vibe	3.5/5 stars

The Ownerz is the sixth studio album by the hip-hop duo Gang Starr, and the last released during Guru's lifetime. It was released on June 24, 2003, by Virgin. It was well-received critically and boasts four singles, "Skills", "Rite Where U Stand", "Nice Girl, Wrong Place", and "Same Team, No Games". The instrumental version of the album was released on September 30, 2003.

== Track listing ==
1. "Intro (HQ, Goo, Panch)" – 0:46
2. "Put Up or Shut Up" (featuring Krumbsnatcha) – 3:15
3. "Werdz from the Ghetto Child" (featuring Smiley the Ghetto Child) – 1:09
4. "Sabotage" – 2:22
5. "Rite Where U Stand" (featuring Jadakiss) – 3:37
6. "Skills" – 3:17
7. "Deadly Habitz" – 4:12
8. "Nice Girl, Wrong Place" (featuring Boy Big) – 3:32
9. "Peace of Mine" – 3:01
10. "Who Got Gunz" (featuring Fat Joe & M.O.P.) – 3:36
11. "Capture (Militia Pt. 3)" (featuring Big Shug & Freddie Foxxx) – 3:23
12. "PLAYTAWIN" – 3:11
13. "Riot Akt" – 4:04
14. "(Hiney)" – 1:31
15. "Same Team, No Games" (featuring NYG'z & Hannibal Stax) – 3:44
16. "In This Life..." (featuring Snoop Dogg & Uncle Reo) – 3:03
17. "The Ownerz" – 2:57
18. "Zonin'" – 2:54
19. "Eulogy" – 2:54
20. "Natural" [Japan Bonus Track] – 2:46
21. "Tha Squeeze" [Japan Bonus Track] – 3:29

== In other media ==
The track "Same Team, No Games" is featured in DJ Premier's playlist for the 2015 video game NBA 2K16.

The track "Natural" was featured on the B-Side of "Skills" 12" single released in 2002.

The track "The Squeeze" was featured on the Training Day soundtrack.

== Charts ==
Chart (2003)	Peak position
Dutch Albums (Album Top 100)	51
Finnish Albums (Suomen virallinen lista)	40
French Albums (SNEP)	39
German Albums (Offizielle Top 100)	50
Italian Albums (FIMI)	75
Swedish Albums (Sverigetopplistan)	47
Swiss Albums (Schweizer Hitparade)	28
UK Albums (Official Charts)	74
UK R&B Albums (Official Charts)	17
US Billboard 200	18
US Top R&B/Hip-Hop Albums (Billboard)	5
