= Mass Appeal (song) =

Single by Gang Starr

from the album Hard to Earn
- Released: February 8, 1994
- Recorded: 1993
- Genre: Jazz rap; hardcore hip-hop; East Coast hip-hop
- Length: 3:41
- Label: Chrysalis; EMI
- Songwriters: Keith Elam; Christopher Martin
- Producer: DJ Premier

Gang Starr singles chronology
"Dwyck" (1992)	"Mass Appeal" (1994)	"Code of the Streets" (1994)

Audio sample
- file; help

Music video
- "Mass Appeal" on YouTube

"Mass Appeal" is a song by American hip hop group Gang Starr, released on February 8, 1994, by Chrysalis and EMI as the second single from their fourth studio album, Hard to Earn (1994). The song reached numbers 57 and 67 on the US Cash Box Top 100 and Billboard Hot 100 charts, and number 42 on the Billboard R&B chart. It was also featured on the soundtrack of the video game Tony Hawk's Pro Skater 4 and reappears in its remake.

== Background ==
According to DJ Premier, "Mass Appeal" was recorded to poke fun at radio when it came to hip hop music:

"It was recorded as a joke. We just wanted to make fun of the radio on what it sounded like to get airplay. That’s why I made the background melody real simplistic. I was making fun of the radio, but I’m going to make a funky version of making fun of it. Everything’s a vision, and your brain has to be that intense to be able to capture that. What the radio played, when it came to hip-hop, it sounded too watered down. That was making fun of it, but that record did real good for us".

The track samples Vic Juris' 1980 song "Horizon Drive." as well as vocals from Pete Rock's remix of Da Youngsta's 1992 track Pass Da Mic, and Big Daddy Kane's 1987 track "Raw""

== Music video ==
The music video was released in March 1994, shortly after Hard to Earn was released. The first verse featured Guru rapping inside an old apartment complex. The second verse featured Guru rapping inside a moving car, and the third verse featured Guru rapping on a beach. DJ Premier mentioned that the video was filmed on a very cold night in Far Rockaway.

== Charts ==
=== Weekly charts ===
Chart (1994)	Peak position
US Billboard Hot 100	67
US Dance Singles Sales (Billboard)	3
US Hot R&B/Hip-Hop Songs (Billboard)	42
US Cash Box Top 100	57

=== Year-end charts ===
Chart (1994)	Position
US Maxi-Singles Sales (Billboard)	30
