= You Know My Steez =

1997 single by Gang Starr

Single by Gang Starr

from the album Moment of Truth
- B-side: "So Wassup?"
- Released: November 18, 1997
- Recorded: 1997
- Genre: Hip hop
- Length: 4:07
- Label: Noo Trybe; Virgin
- Songwriters: Christopher Martin; Keith Elam
- Producer: DJ Premier

Gang Starr singles chronology
"Suckas Need Bodyguards" (1994)	"You Know My Steez" (1997)	"The Militia" (1998)

Music video
- "You Know My Steez" on YouTube

"You Know My Steez" is a song by American hip hop duo Gang Starr, released on November 18, 1997 as the lead single from their fifth studio album Moment of Truth (1998). It samples "Drowning in the Sea of Love" by Joe Simon, "Flash It to the Beat" by Grandmaster Flash and the Furious Five, "B Side Wins Again" by Public Enemy, "Real Hip-Hop" by Das EFX, "Shadowboxin'" by GZA featuring Method Man and "Usual Suspect" by Big Noyd featuring Prodigy.

== Background ==
In an interview with Wax Poetics in 2018, DJ Premier revealed his inspiration behind producing the beat for the song:

I already had the idea of what I wanted to do with the Grandmaster Flash "Flash It to the Beat" sample. Showbiz used it on a skit for Runaway Slave. We used to all hang out—me Showbiz, Large Pro, Pete Rock, Diamond D; we saw each other all the time. We were cool and shared what records we used. So I wanted to do my own interpretation of it after hearing how Showbiz used it.

The hook of the song borrows lyrics from Method Man's verse on "Shadowboxin'".

== Critical reception ==
Brett Johnson of Los Angeles Times described the song as having "barrel-chested bragging", which he regarded as a good part of Moment of Truth. Tom Doggett of RapReviews wrote "Primo's initially awkward beat for 'You Know My Steez' thumps with a crooked combination of bass and treble, but Guru actually snatches the shine from his counterpart".

== Music video ==
The music video was directed by Terry Heller, the nephew of music manager Jerry Heller. It was based on the 1971 film THX 1138 and is set in an underground city where people are medically controlled. Guru and DJ Premier shaved their heads bald for the video.

== Charts ==
Chart (1997–1998)	Peak position
US Billboard Hot 100	76
US Hot R&B/Hip-Hop Songs (Billboard)	32
US Hot Rap Songs (Billboard)	5
