= Hard to Earn =

Studio album by Gang Starr
- Released: March 8, 1994
- Recorded: 1992 – July 1993
- Studio: D&D Studios (New York City)
- Genres: East Coast hip-hop; hardcore hip-hop
- Length: 58:57
- Labels: Chrysalis; EMI 7243 8 28435 2 8 F2-28435
- Producers: DJ Premier; Guru (co-prod.)

Gang Starr chronology
Daily Operation (1992)	Hard to Earn (1994)	Moment of Truth (1998)

Singles from Hard to Earn
- 1. "Dwyck" Released: December 29, 1992; 2. "Mass Appeal" Released: February 8, 1994; 3. "Code of the Streets" Released: May 17, 1994; 4. "Suckas Need Bodyguards" Released: October 4, 1994

Professional ratings
Review scores
Source	Rating
AllMusic	4/5 stars
Robert Christgau	(neither)
RapReviews	8.5/10
Rolling Stone	4/5 stars
The Rolling Stone Album Guide	4.5/5 stars
The Source	4/5 stars

Hard to Earn is the fourth studio album by American hip-hop duo Gang Starr. It was released on March 8, 1994, by Chrysalis and EMI Records in North America. The album featured the singles "Dwyck" (featuring Nice & Smooth), "Mass Appeal" (their first charting single on the Billboard Hot 100 chart), and "Code of the Streets". Guest appearances on the album include Group Home, Jeru the Damaja, and Big Shug. At the time, all were part of the Gang Starr Foundation, which made the album a stepping-stone for future DJ Premier-helmed projects by Group Home and Jeru. Hard to Earn received acclaim and commercial success upon release.

"DWYCK" was first released in 1992 as a stand alone single and music video, but was included on Hard to Earn at the record label's behest; due to its underground acclaim. The track "Now You're Mine" originally appeared on the 1992 soundtrack White Men Can't Rap. The single "Mass Appeal" later appeared in the video game Tony Hawk's Pro Skater 4 and its remake.

== Track listing ==
All music is composed by Keith Elam and Christopher Martin, except where noted.

No.	Title	Writer(s)	Performer(s)	Length
1.	"Intro (The First Step)"		(Instrumental)	0:54
2.	"Alongwaytogo"		Guru	4:13
3.	"Code of the Streets"		Guru	3:29
4.	"Brainstorm"		Guru	3:02
5.	"Tonz 'O' Gunz"		Guru	3:55
6.	"The Planet"		Guru	5:16
7.	"Aiiight Chill..."		A skit featuring Nas, A.G., Masta Ace, MC Eiht, DJ Scratch, Mister Cee	3:13
8.	"Speak Ya Clout"	Martin; Elam; Jeru Kendrick Davis; James Heath	Guru; Lil' Dap; Jeru the Damaja	3:35
9.	"Dwyck"	Martin; Elam; Greg Mays; Daryl Barnes	Guru; Nice & Smooth	4:03
10.	"Words from the Nutcracker"	Martin; Elam; Jamal Felder	Melachi the Nutcracker	1:29
11.	"Mass Appeal"		Guru	3:41
12.	"Blowin' Up the Spot"		Guru	3:10
13.	"Suckas Need Bodyguards"		Guru; Melachi the Nutcracker	4:05
14.	"Now You're Mine"		Guru	2:55
15.	"Mostly Tha Voice"		Guru	3:38
16.	"F.A.L.A."		Guru; Big Shug	4:17
17.	"Comin' for Datazz"		Guru	4:02

== Charts ==
=== Weekly charts ===
Chart (1994)	Peak position
Scottish Albums (Official Charts)	85
UK Albums (Official Charts)	29
US Billboard 200	25
US Top R&B/Hip-Hop Albums (Billboard)	2

=== Year-end charts ===
Chart (1994)	Position
US Top R&B/Hip-Hop Albums (Billboard)	58

== Singles chart positions ==
Year	Song	Chart positions			
Year	Song	Billboard Hot 100	Hot R&B/Hip-Hop Singles & Tracks	Hot Rap Singles	Hot Dance Music/Maxi-Singles Sales
1994	DWYCK	-	-	25	12
1994	Mass Appeal	67	42	10	3
1994	Code of the Streets	-	83	33	5
1994	Suckas Need Bodyguards	-	-	44	18
