= Group Home =

American hip hop group

- Origin: New York City, New York, U.S.
- Genres: Hip hop
- Years active: 1990–present
- Labels: Payday/FFRR/PolyGram; Replay Records
- Members: Melachi the Nutcracker; Lil' Dap

Group Home is a hip hop duo, composed of members Lil' Dap (birth name James Heath; b. March 6, 1972) and Melachi the Nutcracker (birth name Jamal Felder; b. October 5, 1972). They came to prominence as members of the Gang Starr Foundation. Lil' Dap made his rhyming debut on Gang Starr's 1992 classic Daily Operation on the song "I'm the Man". Both members appeared on Gang Starr's critically acclaimed 1994 effort Hard to Earn, on the tracks "Speak Ya Clout" and "Words from the Nutcracker". In 1995, the group released its debut album, Livin' Proof. The album was very well received, mainly due to DJ Premier's advanced production work, described by Allmusic as "rhythmic masterpieces". A second album A Tear for the Ghetto was released in 1999, this time with only one track produced by DJ Premier.

Lil' Dap released a solo single, "Brooklyn Zone", in 2001, and guested on several other releases. As of 2007, Lil' Dap is an independent artist. He released in 2008 a solo album called I.A.Dap. In 1996 they toured with Cypress Hill and Brotherhood in London, UK. In 2008 they featured with Clipse at the Highline Ballroom in New York. Lil' Dap released the ep "Code Of Silence" in 2014. In 2017 they performed at the OUT4FAME Festival in Germany and the Royal Arena Festival in the UK. In 2019 they reunited with Gang Starr for their song “What’s Real” with Royce da 5’9, off the former’s closer album One of the Best Yet.

== Discography ==
List of studio albums, with selected chart positions
Title	Album details	Peak chart positions
Title	Album details	US R&B
Livin' Proof	Released: November 21, 1995; Label: Payday, FFRR, PolyGram; Format: CD, LP, cassette, digital download	34
A Tear for the Ghetto	Released: June 1, 1999; Label: Replay; Format: CD, LP, cassette, digital download	—
Where Back	Released: April 23, 2008; Label: Lastrum; Format: CD, digital download	—
Gifted Unlimited Rhymes Universal	Released: September 28, 2010; Label: Babygrande; Format: CD, digital download	—
Forever	Released: February 28, 2017; Label: Smoke On; Format: CD, digital download	—
