= No More Mr. Nice Guy (Gang Starr album) =

Studio album by Gang Starr
- Released: June 6, 1989
- Recorded: 1989
- Genres: Hip-hop; jazz rap
- Length: 53:30
- Labels: Wild Pitch; EMI 0777 7 98709 2 9 E2-98709
- Producers: DJ Premier; Guru; the 45 King

Gang Starr chronology
No More Mr. Nice Guy (1989)	Step in the Arena (1991)

No More Mr. Nice Guy is the debut studio album by American hip-hop duo Gang Starr. The album was released on June 6, 1989. It peaked at No. 83 on the Billboard R&B chart. The song "Positivity" peaked at No. 19 on the Billboard rap chart.

== Critical reception ==
Professional ratings
Review scores
Source	Rating
AllMusic	3/5 stars
The Encyclopedia of Popular Music	3/5 stars
The Rolling Stone Album Guide	3/5 stars

The Los Angeles Times noted that some songs "are more concerned with educating and relating than with egos and bragging, using hot soul-flavored dance beats and infusions of jazz." Trouser Press wrote that "DJ Premier provides samples, beats and rhythms that are perfectly adequate, if not up to his future level."

== Track listing ==
All songs are produced by DJ Premier & Guru, except for tracks 5 & 13, produced by the 45 King

No.	Title	Length
1.	"Premier & The Guru"	3:26
2.	"Jazz Music"	3:30
3.	"Gotch U"	3:08
4.	"Manifest"	4:56
5.	"Gusto"	3:15
6.	"DJ Premier in Deep Concentration"	3:13
7.	"Positivity (Remix)"	4:49
8.	"Words I Manifest (Remix)"	5:12
9.	"Conscience Be Free"	4:04
10.	"Cause and Effect"	3:22
11.	"2 Steps Ahead"	3:50
12.	"No More Mr. Nice Guy"	3:22
13.	"Knowledge" (featuring Damo D-Ski)	3:42
14.	"Positivity"	3:35
15.	"Here's the Proof" (2001 Re-issue Bonus Track)	4:35
16.	"The Lesson" (2001 Re-issue Bonus Track)	5:05
17.	"Dedication" (2001 Re-issue Bonus Track)	5:11
Total length:		53:30

The PRT Records cassette issue in the UK contains "Movin' On (Vocal)" and "Movin' On (Dub)" as bonus tracks B7 and B8.

== Singles ==
Single information
"The Lesson" [Non-Album Single]
- Released: 1987
- B-side: "The Lesson (Super Club Mix)"
"Believe Dat!" [Non-Album Single]
- Released: 1987
- B-side: "Bust a Move Boy" & "To Be a Champion"
"Movin' On" [Non-Album Single]
- Released: 1988
- B-side: "Gusto" & "Knowledge"
"Words I Manifest (Remix)"
- Released: 1989
- B-side: "DJ Premier In Deep Concentration", "Here's the Proof"
"Positivity (Remix)"
- Released: 1989
- B-side: "No More Mr. Nice Guy (Remix)"

== Charts ==
Chart (1990)	Peak position
US Top R&B/Hip-Hop Albums (Billboard)	83

=== Singles ===
Year	Song	Hot Rap Singles
1990	"Positivity"	19
