= Step in the Arena =

Studio album by Gang Starr
- Released: 1990 (liner notes); January 15, 1991 (commercial release)
- Studios: Calliope Productions in New York, New York; Firehouse in Brooklyn, New York; Such-A-Sound in Brooklyn, New York
- Genre: East Coast hip-hop
- Length: 50:37
- Labels: Chrysalis; EMI 0946 3 21798 2 1 F2-21798
- Producers: DJ Premier; Guru

Gang Starr chronology
No More Mr. Nice Guy (1989)	Step in the Arena (1990)	Daily Operation (1992)

Singles from Step in the Arena
- 1. "Just to Get a Rep" Released: 1990; 2. "Take a Rest" Released: 1991; 3. "Lovesick" Released: 1991; 4. "Step in the Arena" Released: 1991; 5. "Who's Gonna Take the Weight?" Released: 1991

Step in the Arena is the second studio album by hip-hop duo Gang Starr, printed as a 1990 release, and commercially released on January 15, 1991. In 2007, it was named the greatest hip-hop album of all time by IGN. HipHopDX called it "the album that cemented Gang Starr as a timeless tag team."

== Background ==
Filmmaker Spike Lee was a fan of Gang Starr's debut No More Mr. Nice Guy, particularly the song "Jazz Music". As Lee was filming Mo' Better Blues at the time of the album's release, he felt the duo needed to expand on the song's theme - which became the single "Jazz Thing". Lee introduced them to a poem written by Lolis Eric Elie, which group member Guru converted to a rap, as the poem didn't rhyme. The song caught the attention of Chrysalis Records, who offered them a deal based on "Jazz Thing". However, DJ Premier said the label had gotten the wrong idea of the group, stating: "When they signed us, they thought we were going to do records like "Jazz Thing" all the time. When we were just doing that for Mo' Better Blues".

== Critical reception ==
Professional ratings
Review scores
Source	Rating
AllMusic	5/5 stars
Entertainment Weekly	B
NME	8/10
Q	4/5 stars
Record Mirror	5/5
(The New) Rolling Stone Album Guide	4.5/5 stars
Select	4/5
Sounds	4/5 stars
The Source	3.5/5
Spin Alternative Record Guide	7/10

In his review for The Source, Rob "Reef" Tewlow wrote: "Step in the Arena stands alone on a musical level, yet it also remains true to hip-hop's underground heritage."

== Legacy ==
In addition to IGN.com and HipHopDX's accolades, Step in the Arena was featured in the book 1001 Albums You Must Hear Before You Die. In 1998, it was included in The Source's "100 Best Albums" list.

== In popular culture ==
The song "Who's Gonna Take the Weight" was remixed by DJ Premier for use in the video game Grand Theft Auto IV. "Step In the Arena" was on the video games Skate It and Skate 2, and "Just to Get a Rep" was on Thrasher: Skate and Destroy.

== Track listing ==
No.	Title	Length
1.	"Name Tag (Premier & the Guru)"	0:36
2.	"Step in the Arena"	3:36
3.	"Form of Intellect"	3:37
4.	"Execution of a Chump (No More Mr. Nice Guy Pt. 2)"	2:39
5.	"Who's Gonna Take the Weight?"	3:54
6.	"Beyond Comprehension"	3:10
7.	"Check the Technique"	3:55
8.	"Lovesick"	3:22
9.	"Here Today, Gone Tomorrow"	2:16
10.	"Game Plan"	1:06
11.	"Take a Rest"	4:18
12.	"What You Want This Time?"	2:39
13.	"Street Ministry"	1:21
14.	"Just to Get a Rep"	2:39
15.	"Say Your Prayers"	1:20
16.	"As I Read My S-A"	2:35
17.	"Precisely the Right Rhymes"	3:22
18.	"The Meaning of the Name"	2:53

Japanese edition bonus track
No.	Title	Length
19.	"Credit Is Due"	4:51

== Personnel ==
- Guru – rapping, production, mixing
- DJ Premier – beats, scratching, production, mixing
- Lisle Leete – piano, engineering
- Shlomo Sonnenfeld – engineering
- Yoram Vazam – engineering
- Howie Weinberg – mastering
- Marc Cozza – art direction, design
- Rick Patrick – logo

== Charts ==
=== Album ===
Chart (1991)	Peak position
Australian Albums (ARIA)	141
UK Albums (Official Charts)	36
US Billboard 200	121
US Top R&B/Hip-Hop Albums (Billboard)	19

=== Singles ===
Year	Song	Chart position
Year	Song	Hot Rap Singles
1990	"Just to Get a Rep"	5
1991	"Who's Gonna Take the Weight?"	9
1991	"Lovesick"	11
1991	"Step in the Arena"	5
