= Moment of Truth (Gang Starr album) =

Studio album by Gang Starr
- Released: March 31, 1998
- Recorded: 1997–1998
- Studio: D&D (New York City)
- Genres: East Coast hip-hop; conscious hip-hop; jazz rap; hardcore hip-hop
- Length: 78:37
- Labels: Noo Trybe; Virgin
- Producers: DJ Premier; Guru

Gang Starr chronology
Hard to Earn (1994)	Moment of Truth (1998)	Full Clip: A Decade of Gang Starr (1999)

Singles from Moment of Truth
- 1. "You Know My Steez" Released: November 18, 1997; 2. "The Militia" Released: July 28, 1998

Professional ratings
Review scores
Source	Rating
AllMusic	3/5 stars
Chicago Tribune	4/4 stars
Entertainment Weekly	B+
Houston Chronicle	4/5 stars
Los Angeles Times	3/4 stars
Muzik	7/10
NME	8/10
The Rolling Stone Album Guide	3.5/5 stars
The Source	4.5/5 stars
USA Today	3.5/4 stars

Moment of Truth is the fifth studio album by American hip-hop duo Gang Starr, released on March 31, 1998, by Noo Trybe Records and Virgin Records. Gang Starr recorded Moment of Truth in sessions at D&D Studios. It is widely regarded as Gang Starr's magnum opus, and one of the greatest hip-hop albums of all time.

== Background and recording ==
Moment of Truth marked Gang Starr's fifth studio album, released in 1998 following a four-year hiatus. Prior to the album, both artists were pursuing solo work; with DJ Premier prolifically collaborating with artists such as Jay-Z, Nas, and Biggie during this period, while Guru had released his second instalment of his Jazzmatazz series. This contributed to a refined sound for the album, while maintaining the group's signature hardcore style.

Guru faced serious legal issues, including a gun charge that could have resulted in a five-year prison sentence. The weight of this potential outcome influenced much of the album's thematic direction, particularly in tracks such as "Moment of Truth," which reflected the group's real-life struggles. Tension over Guru's drinking habits also briefly led to DJ Premier stepping away from the group during the album's production. However, the two reconciled and completed the album together.

== Commercial performance and legacy ==
The album is the group's most commercially successful album to date. Moment of Truth debuted at #1 on the Top R&B/Hip Hop Albums chart. The album sold 97,000 copies in its first week. It went on to sell over 500,000 copies and was certified Gold by the RIAA on May 7, 1998. The lead single, "You Know My Steez", became the duo's second Billboard Hot 100 appearance in 1997, peaking at #76. Spin magazine ranked it as the #16 album of 1998. Pitchfork also ranked it as the 16th best album of 1998. Writer Marcus J. Moore wrote: "Moment of Truth is an all-in effort that found the duo at their creative apex. Not only did Guru and Premier step up their respective talents, the album also featured standout verses from rappers Inspectah Deck, Freddie Foxxx, G-Dep, and Scarface. For a group teetering on the edge, Moment of Truth is Gang Starr’s shining moment."

== In popular culture ==
The album's title track was featured in the 2011 Matthew McConaughey film The Lincoln Lawyer. The title track also appeared in the soundtrack of the 2001 video game Dave Mirra Freestyle BMX 2 as well as an episode during the third season of the television show Mr. Robot. The song Work appears on ESPN promos for SC6 with Michael/Jemele. Work also appeared in the 1998 movie Caught Up starring Bokeem Woodbine and was included on the soundtrack. Work was again sampled in 2019 for a Bank of Melbourne television commercial.

== Track listing ==
All music is composed by Keith Elam and Christopher Martin.

No.	Title	Performer(s)	Length
1.	"You Know My Steez"	Guru	4:07
2.	"Robbin Hood Theory"	Guru	3:44
3.	"Work"	Guru	2:57
4.	"Royalty"	Guru; K-Ci & JoJo	5:11
5.	"Above the Clouds"	Guru; Inspectah Deck	3:41
6.	"JFK 2 LAX"	Guru	3:34
7.	"Itz a Set Up"	Guru; Hannibal Stax	3:49
8.	"Moment of Truth"	Guru	3:35
9.	"B.I. vs Friendship"	Guru; M.O.P.	4:37
10.	"The Militia"	Guru; Big Shug; Freddie Foxxx	4:48
11.	"The Rep Grows Bigga"	Guru	4:55
12.	"What I'm Here 4"	Guru	2:45
13.	"She Knowz What She Wantz"	Guru	3:00
14.	"New York Strait Talk"	Guru	4:14
15.	"My Advice 2 You"	Guru	2:31
16.	"Make 'Em Pay"	Guru; Krumb Snatcha	4:21
17.	"The Mall"	Guru; G. Dep; Shiggy Sha	3:40
18.	"Betrayal"	Guru; Scarface	5:29
19.	"Next Time"	Guru	3:06
20.	"In Memory Of..."	DJ Premier; Guru	3:50

== Charts ==
=== Weekly charts ===
Chart (1998)	Peak position
Australian Albums (ARIA)	184
Canadian Albums (Billboard)	14
Dutch Albums (Album Top 100)	51
French Albums (SNEP)	70
German Albums (Offizielle Top 100)	94
Swedish Albums (Sverigetopplistan)	28
UK Albums (Official Charts)	43
UK R&B Albums (Official Charts)	4
US Billboard 200	6
US Top R&B/Hip-Hop Albums (Billboard	1

=== Year-end charts ===
Chart (1998)	Position
US Top R&B/Hip-Hop Albums (Billboard)	59

=== Singles ===
Chart positions from Billboard magazine

Year	Song	Billboard Hot 100	Hot R&B/Hip-Hop Songs	Hot Rap Singles	Dance/Electronic Singles Sales
1997	"You Know My Steez"	76	15	5	2
1998	"Royalty		2		
1998	"The Militia"	–	19	7	–

== Certifications ==
Region	Certification	Certified units/sales
Canada (Music Canada)	Gold	50,000^{‡}
United Kingdom (BPI)	Silver	60,000^{‡}
United States (RIAA)	Gold	500,000^{^}
^{^} Shipments figures based on certification alone.^{‡} Sales+streaming figures based on certification alone.

== See also ==
- List of Billboard number-one R&B albums of 1998
