= Daily Operation =

Studio album by Gang Starr
- Released: May 5, 1992
- Studios: D&D, Calliope Studios, New York City
- Genres: East Coast hip-hop; jazz rap; hardcore hip-hop
- Length: 53:50
- Label: Chrysalis
- Producers: DJ Premier; "The Guru"

Gang Starr chronology
Step in the Arena (1991)	Daily Operation (1992)	Hard to Earn (1994)

Singles from Daily Operation
- 1. "Take It Personal" Released: March 30, 1992; 2. "Ex Girl to Next Girl" Released: August 18, 1992; 3. "2 Deep" Released: 1992

Daily Operation is the third studio album by American hip-hop duo Gang Starr. It was released by Chrysalis Records on May 5, 1992. It peaked at number 65 on the Billboard 200 chart.

== Critical reception ==
Professional ratings
Review scores
Source	Rating
AllMusic	5/5 stars
Orlando Sentinel	4/5 stars
RapReviews	9.5/10
Rolling Stone	4/5 stars
The Rolling Stone Album Guide	5/5 stars
Select	4/5
The Source	3.5/5 stars
Sputnikmusic	4.5/5

Stanton Swihart of AllMusic wrote: "From beginning to end, Gang Starr's third full-length album cuts with the force and precision of a machete and serves as an ode to and representation of New York and hip-hop underground culture." He added: "Every song has some attribute that stamps it indelibly into the listener's head, and it marks the album as one of the finest of the decade, rap or otherwise."

In 2017, Complex placed it at number 41 on the "Best Rap Albums of the '90s" list.

== Track listing ==
No.	Title	Length
1.	"Daily Operation (Intro)"	0:27
2.	"The Place Where We Dwell"	2:27
3.	"Flip the Script"	4:02
4.	"Ex Girl to Next Girl"	4:40
5.	"Soliloquy of Chaos"	3:13
6.	"I'm the Man" (featuring Lil Dap and Jeru the Damaja)	4:05
7.	"92 Interlude"	0:28
8.	"Take It Personal"	3:07
9.	"2 Deep"	3:38
10.	"24-7/365"	0:24
11.	"No Shame in My Game"	3:55
12.	"Conspiracy"	2:48
13.	"The Illest Brother"	4:44
14.	"Hardcore Composer"	3:17
15.	"B. Y. S."	3:06
16.	"Much Too Much (Mack a Mil)"	3:30
17.	"Take Two and Pass"	3:18
18.	"Stay Tuned"	2:31

== Personnel ==
Credits adapted from liner notes.

- DJ Premier – producer, beats, scratches, mixing
- "The Guru" – vocals, producer, mixing
- Lil Dap – vocals (6)
- Jeru the Damaja – vocals (6, 11)
- Eddie Sancho – engineering
- Lisle Leete – recording (13), engineering
- Yorum Vazan – mixing (13)
- Eddie Sancho – engineering
- Howie Weinberg – mastering
- Marc Cozza – art direction, design
- Matt Gunther – photography
- April Walker – fashion styling

== Charts ==
=== Weekly charts ===
Chart (1992)	Peak position
US Billboard 200	65
US Top R&B/Hip-Hop Albums (Billboard)	14

=== Year-end charts ===
Chart (1992)	Position
US Top R&B/Hip-Hop Albums (Billboard)	56
