= Big Shug =

American rapper from Boston

- Born: Cary Guy; December 13, 1961 (age 64); Boston, Massachusetts, U.S.
- Genre: East Coast hip hop
- Occupations: Rapper; singer; songwriter; actor
- Years active: 1985–present
- Labels: Brick; Babygrande; Koch
- Formerly of: Gang Starr Foundation

Cary Guy (born December 13, 1961), better known as Big Shug, is an American rapper from Boston, Massachusetts, a co-founder of Gang Starr and a member of the Gang Starr Foundation collective.

== Biography ==
Born in Boston, Cary spent much of his early life in Boston's Mattapan area (known locally as "Murdapan"). Growing up, he forged a friendship with rapper Guru, leading to them eventually founding the group Gang Starr in Morehouse College with Shug's younger brother DJ Suave D. The group disbanded when Shug was imprisoned and eventually Guru moved to New York, where he added DJ Premier to Gang Starr.

On his release, Shug again hooked up with Guru, joined the Gang Starr Foundation, and contributed to each of Gang Starr's albums, beginning with Hard to Earn in 1994 (on "F.A.L.A."). He also appeared on DJ Krush's Meiso in 1995 as well as "The Militia" from 1998's Moment of Truth, and contributed to Guru's Jazzmatazz albums.

During the 1990s, Shug recorded a few 12-inch singles produced by DJ Premier for Payday and Chrysalis, but his first proper solo album, Who's Hard was not released until 2005 and half of the songs were handled by DJ Premier.

He signed to New York's Babygrande in 2007, and released his second album, Streetchamp. The album was produced by MoSS and DJ Premier and features guest appearances from DJ Premier and Sean Price.

A third solo album, Otherside of the Game, was released in November 2008, and features DJ Premier, Bumpy Knuckles, Billy Danze of M.O.P., Termanology, Blaq Poet, and Singapore Kane. He performed at the 2009 Boston hemp fest.

He is featured on the single "Tap Out", which appears on M-Dot & DJ Jean Maron's 2010 album Run MPC. The video of "tap out" was directed by Steven TAPIA. In 2010 he also collaborated with (artist) Aztech and (producer) Reel Drama on their album Hybrid Genetics. In 2010 he collaborated with west coast hip hop artist Spinz on a song called "Round Tha World" that was recorded while touring Europe. In 2012 he worked again with Dj Jean Maron for the release of the official remix of "Heavy" a posse cut with M-Dot, Benefit & B.A.M (M.O.P/Lil Fame's cousin).

In 2013 Guy appeared in two movies. In the HBO movie "Clear History," he was door security for the band Chicago. In "The Heat," starring Sandra Bullock and Melissa McCarthy, he was "Tough Guy #2." He also appeared in Boston-based films "The Town", and "Black Mass".

Big Shug released his sixth studio album "Triple OGzus" in March 2015. Shug's upcoming project is entitled "The Living Room Project" according to his Instagram page. As of January 2019, there is no word on the release date of the album. In January 2019, Big Shug announced his new album will be entitled “The Diamond Report” while “The Living Room Project” has been rumored to have been shelved or pushed off but Shug has not confirmed this.

A promotional single entitled "Still Big" for Shug's new album coming out later that month was released on October 7. On October 25, 2019, Big Shug released his seventh studio album "The Diamond Report". On the same day, Shug released the first single from the album "EMF" which was produced by long time friend of Guy, DJ Premier. The following week, Big Shug was featured on Gang Starr's newest album "One of the Best Yet" on two tracks, "One of the Best Yet (Big Shug Interlude)" and "Take Flight (Militia, Pt. 4)".

Big Shug's music is known to frequently be featured on DJ Premier's radio show on Sirius XM.

In late 2024 Big Shug announced that his eighth album would be titled "Undefeated" and fully produced by DJ Premier. The album was slated for an early 2025 release.

== Discography ==
- Never Say Die: The Pre-Album (2005)
- Who's Hard? (2005)
- Street Champ (2007)
- Otherside of the Game (2008)
- I.M. 4-EVA (2012)
- Triple OGzus (2015)
- The Diamond Report (2019)
- Undefeated (with DJ Premier) (TBA)
