= Gang Starr =

American hip hop duo

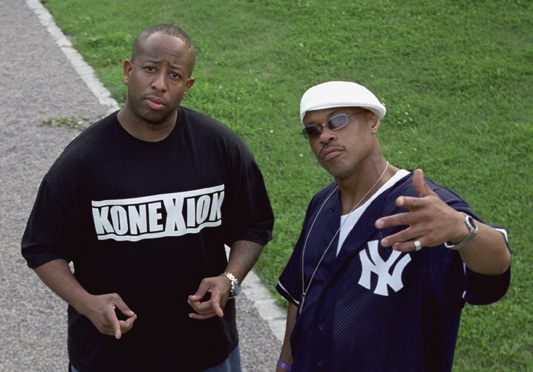
- Gang Starr in 2003

Background information
- Origin: Brooklyn, New York City, U.S.
- Genres: East Coast hip-hop; jazz rap
- Works: Gang Starr discography
- Years active: 1985–2003
- Labels: Virgin; Wild Pitch; Chrysalis; Noo Trybe
- Spinoff of: Gang Starr Foundation
- Past members: DJ Premier; Guru

Gang Starr were an American hip hop duo, consisting of Houston-born record producer DJ Premier and Boston-based rapper Guru.

Gang Starr was active from 1985 to 2003, and is considered a widely influential MC-and-producer duo. They are recognized for being one of the pioneers of jazz rap active during the golden age of hip hop. Some of their top hits include "Mass Appeal", "Take It Personal", "Moment of Truth", "Full Clip" and "Above The Clouds".

== History ==
=== Original and second group lineups ===
The original Gang Starr group was founded in Morehouse College by three friends from Boston, Massachusetts: Guru (then known as MC Keithy E.) who had planned to be a rapper/singer, Big Shug as the main MC and DJ Suave D (Shug's younger brother Dana) as their DJ. After Shug was imprisoned, Suave D quit the group, leaving Guru to enlist the services of MC Damo D-Ski and DJ 1, 2 B-Down (also known as Mike Dee) with various producers, such as Donald D, J.V. Johnson or the 45 King helping out. Their earliest recordings were in 1986 where they made various demos. In 1987 and 1988, Gang Starr released three 12-inch vinyl singles on Wild Pitch Records.

=== Breakup and partnering with DJ Premier ===
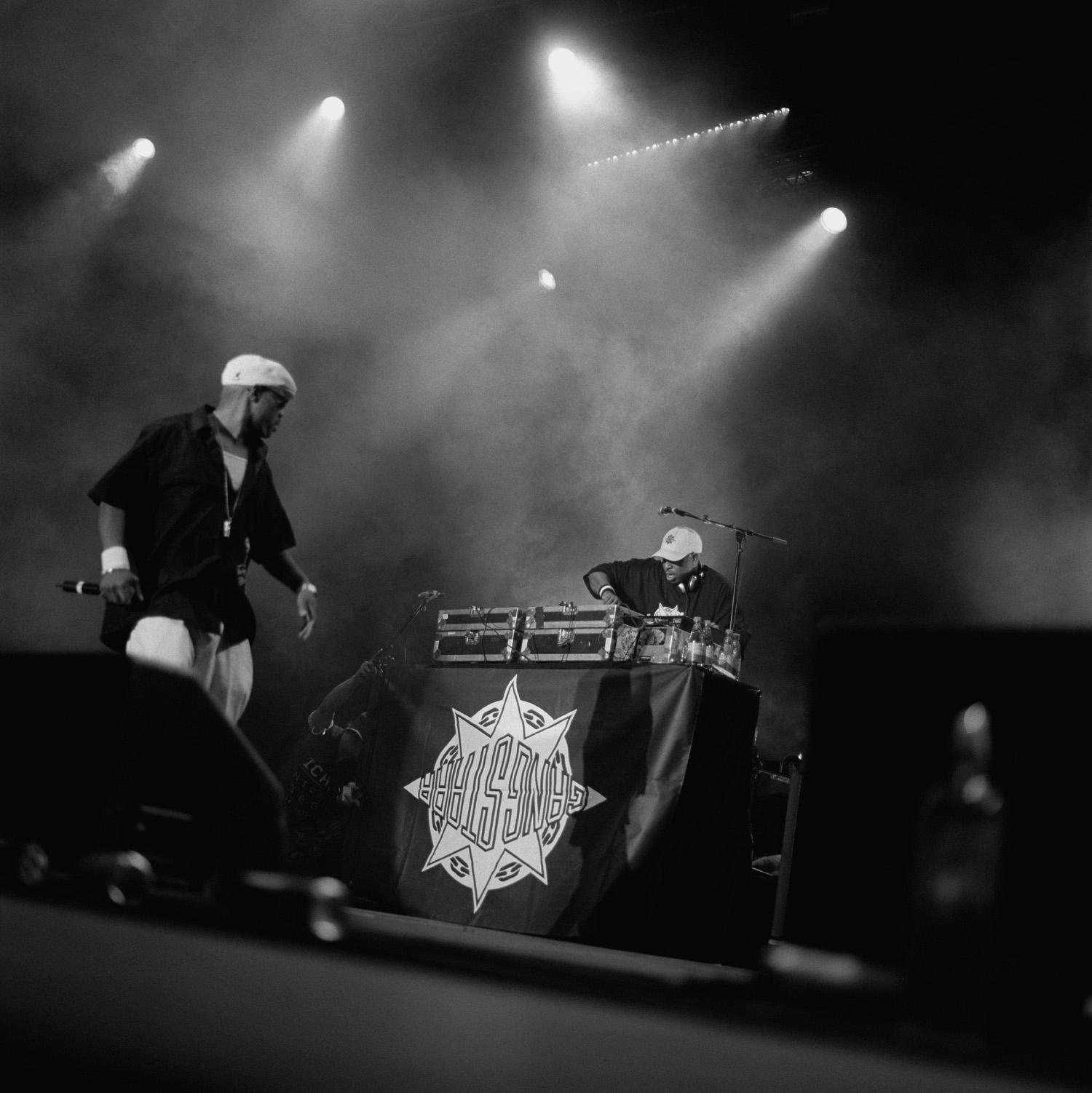
Gang Starr performing in Hamburg in 1999

In 1989, the group split for the second time and the only member willing to continue under the name was Guru. He got in touch with Houston, Texas native DJ Premier (then known as Waxmaster C) who submitted a tape of beats to Wild Pitch records, which Guru liked. He invited DJ Premier to join Gang Starr, relocate with him to Brooklyn and in that same year they released their first single "Words I Manifest" along with the album No More Mr. Nice Guy (1989). In 1990, the group was signed to the Chrysalis record label by then A&R director Duff Marlowe, a former DJ and Los Angeles Times rap music critic. The label offered Guru and Premier unlimited artistic license and major-label distribution worldwide, a platform the group used to become one of the most influential hip hop acts of that decade. During their career Gang Starr helped pioneer the New York City hardcore hip hop sound. The Gang Starr catalog, especially Step in the Arena (1991), Daily Operation (1992), Hard to Earn (1994) and Moment of Truth (1998) are well respected among underground rap fans and critics. Their track "Jazz Thing" was featured on the soundtrack to Spike Lee's film Mo' Better Blues. Gang Starr provided a track, "Battle", for the soundtrack of the 2002 movie 8 Mile.

After several albums and tours, in late 2002 DJ Premier left Europe to go back to the United States. Once again Guru was faced with continuing alone and became involved in a European tour in 2003–04 with an alternate DJ. In 2006, Guru indicated in several interviews that Gang Starr had reached its end.

=== Guru's death ===
In February 2010, Guru suffered a heart attack, went into a coma, and died on April 19, 2010. DJ Solar, a long-time collaborator of Guru, said Guru chose not to go public with the diagnosis of myeloma that was made in 2000. Guru appeared to have fallen out with DJ Premier seven years prior to his death and did "not wish my ex-DJ to have anything to do with my name, likeness, events, tributes, etc." There is speculation that the letter was not written by Guru, but was composed by Solar. The validity of the statement was questioned by Guru's family and his contemporaries.

=== Post Guru ===
Soon after DJ Premier stated that there was a "posthumous Gang Starr CD/DVD project in the works," and most likely to have been released in 2014, but nothing was released. DJ Premier confirmed in late 2015 that he was working on a Gang Starr biopic with the cooperation of Guru's sister, Patricia Elam.

In 2019, DJ Premier released a new single under the Gang Starr name entitled "Family and Loyalty" featuring J. Cole, to be followed with a new album titled One of the Best Yet, which was released on November 1 that year.

== Gang Starr Foundation ==
The Gang Starr Foundation was a loose collective of various people who have worked closely with the group, through either Guru's now defunct Ill Kid label, DJ Premier's production work or the management company that Gang Starr was represented by, Empire Management. Members of the foundation included Big Shug, Afu-Ra, Jeru the Damaja, Bahamadia, Krumbsnatcha, True Master, Freddie Foxxx (AKA Bumpy Knuckles), Group Home, M.O.P., Hannibal Stax, & NYG'z (Panchi, Shiggy Sha).

It was established in 1993.

== Legacy ==
Each episode title of the first season of the Netflix series Luke Cage, based on the Marvel Comics character, was named after a Gang Starr song.

== Discography ==
Studio albums

- No More Mr. Nice Guy (1989)
- Step in the Arena (1991)
- Daily Operation (1992)
- Hard to Earn (1994)
- Moment of Truth (1998)
- The Ownerz (2003)
- One of the Best Yet (2019)
