= S.L. Shneiderman =

Jewish writer, journalist, translator and poet (1906–1996)

Samuel Leib Shneiderman
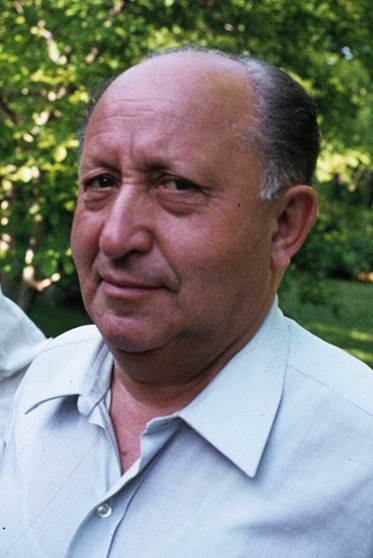
- Shneiderman in 1974
- Born: June 15, 1906; Kazimierz Dolny, Russian Empire
- Died: October 8, 1996 (aged 90); Tel Aviv, Israel
- Occupations: Yiddish and English-language poet, writer, and journalist
- Spouse: Eileen (née Chaja) Szymin-Shneiderman† (1933–1996)
- Children: Ben Shneiderman (b. 1947), Helen Sarid (née Shneiderman) (b. 1937)
- Relatives: David Seymour† (brother-in-law)
- Writing career
- Pen name: S.L. Shneiderman, "Emil"
- Language: English, Yiddish
- Years active: 1927–1990
- Notable awards: 1970 Bergen Belsen Remembrance Award; 1980 Atran Prize for Yiddish Literature

S.L. Shneiderman (15 June 1906 – 8 October 1996) was a prominent Jewish writer, journalist, translator and poet, who wrote in both Yiddish and English.

As a journalist, he covered 1930s Paris and reported on the Spanish Civil War before immigrating to the United States in 1940. His works in Yiddish, Arthur Szyk (1980), Tsvishn shrek un hofenung (1947), and Ven di Visl hot geredt Yidish (1970) were among the “1000 Essential Yiddish Books” noted by the Yiddish Book Center. His English books include Between Fear and Hope (1947), The Warsaw Heresy (1959), and The River Remembers (1978).

== Early life and career ==
Shneiderman was born as Szmuel Lejb Sznajderman (Yiddish: שמואל לײב שנײַדערמאַן) in Kazimierz Dolny, Congress Poland in the Russian Empire. Shneiderman grew up going to both a religious Jewish elementary school and a Polish middle school. He moved to Warsaw in 1925 to study literature and journalism at the Free Polish University (Polish: Wolna Wszechnica Polska). There, he wrote poems about poverty, unemployment, industrial expansion, the rejection of militarism, and an idealized, pastoral Polish village life. He published two books of poems: Gilderne Feigl (Golden Birds) in 1927 and Feyern in Shtot (Unrest in Town) in 1932. Some of these poems were reproduced and appeared in the leading Yiddish weekly in Warsaw at the time, Literarische Bletter (Literary Pages).

His first few years in interwar Warsaw were marked by a renewal in Jewish creative culture and a flourishing Jewish avant-garde artistic movement. Shneiderman experimented with genres of Yiddish writing beyond poetry, interviewing Polish writers, translating poems and novels into Yiddish, and writing songs for the Yiddish theater.

He also took an interest in cinema as a politically powerful art form. In September 1928, Shneiderman published two articles in the first issue of the (short-lived) first Yiddish journal devoted to cinema, Film Velt (Film World), published in Warsaw and edited by Saul Goskin and Mark Tannenbaum. In his first article, “Film has Deep Meaning,” Shneiderman argued that movie making was an important form of cultural mass entertainment and emphasized the social significance of the cinema. His second essay, published under the pseudonym “Emil”, “Behind the Scenes of In the Polish Woods”, narrated the production of the eponymous movie based on the novel by Yosef Opatoshu.

In 1933, he married Eileen (Hala) Szymin, née Chaja (1908–2004), the daughter of Regina and Benjamin Szymin, a major publisher of Hebrew and Yiddish books in Warsaw. After the German invasion of Poland in 1939, her parents, who lived in Otwock, were imprisoned in the Otwock and Warsaw ghettos. They were both killed by the Nazis. Eileen was the older sister of David “Chim” Seymour, a Polish photojournalist and co-founder of Magnum Photos, famous for his photographs of the Spanish Civil War and of child war refugees after World War II. Eileen devoted herself to preserving and promoting Chim’s work after his death in 1956, including organizing a 1996 exhibit at the International Center of Photography, where she became an honorary trustee. Eileen was a partner in their travels and participated in researching and editing S.L. Shneiderman's writings in both Yiddish and English.

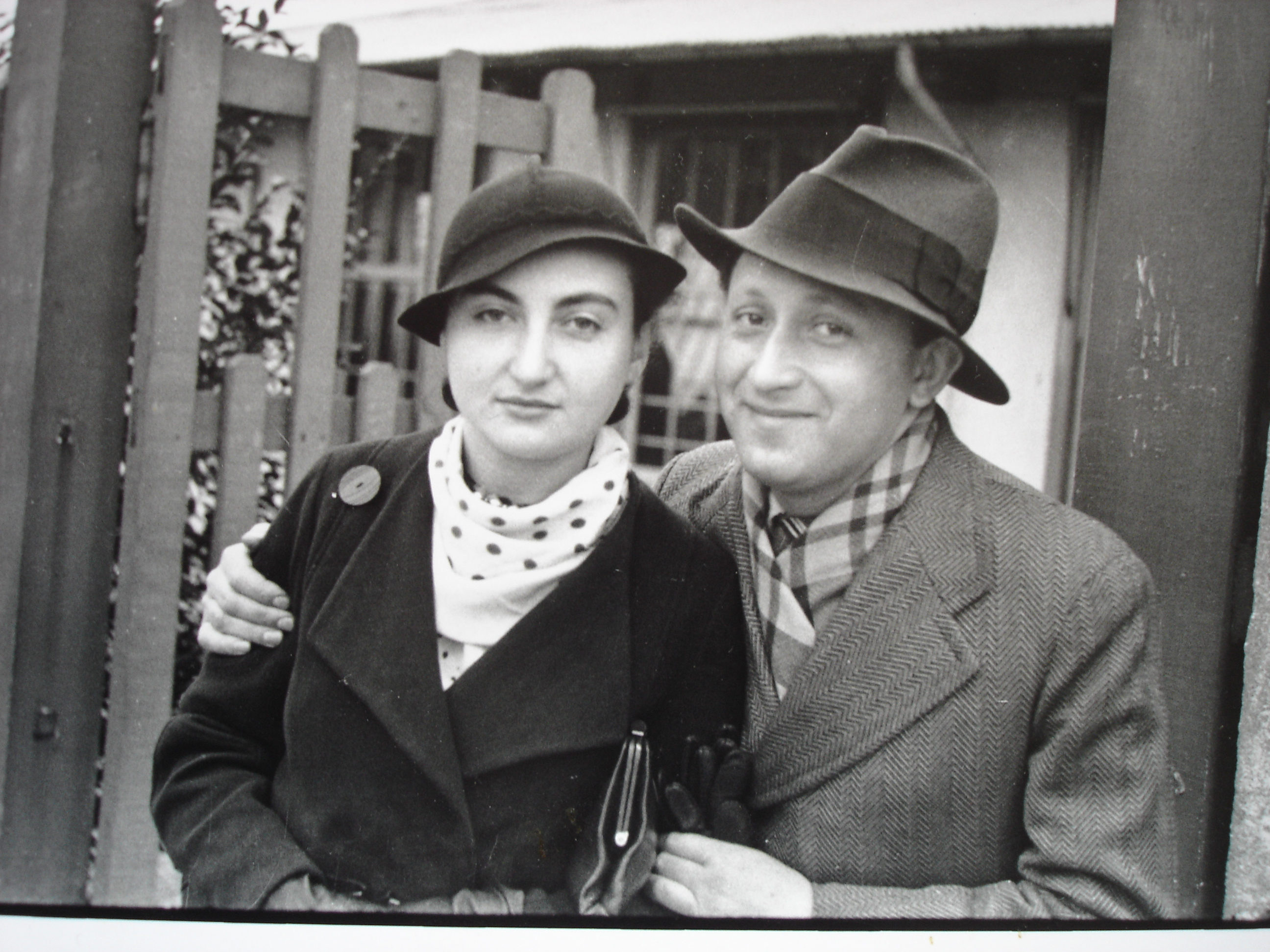
S. L. Shneiderman & Eileen Szymin-Shneiderman in Paris in 1931–1933

The couple moved to Paris in 1933, where he worked as a journalist and correspondent for various Polish and Yiddish daily newspapers. Under the influence of Egon Erwin Kisch, Shneiderman began to write prose. He published his first volume of reportages, Zvishn Nalewkes un Eifel-Turm (English: Between Nalewsky and the Eiffel Tower) in 1935, with a foreword by Kisch, and in Polish Od Nalewek do Wieży Eiffla in 1936.

Between 1936 and 1938, Shneiderman reported on the Spanish Civil War and anti-fascist politics in Yiddish. He published his reportages in Krig in Shpanyen: Hinterland (English: The War in the Spanish Hinterland) in 1938, including his brother-in-law Chim’s photographs of the conflict. Some of the pieces Shneiderman published on the Spanish Civil war were later translated into Hebrew in Mandatory Palestine. His coverage earned him the moniker as the “first Yiddish war reporter.” Translations recently appeared in Polish in 2021, in Spanish in 2023, and in English in 2024.

After the collapse of the Spanish Republic in 1939, Shneiderman spent six months in South Africa as part of a lecture tour, where he considered taking a permanent editorship for the Yiddish newspaper Afrikaner idishe tsaytung (English: African Jewish newspaper) in Johannesburg. Deciding to return to Paris, he stopped and visited Mandatory Palestine (later Israel) for the first time. Amid news of increasing German aggression in Central-Eastern Europe, S.L. Shneiderman and Eileen immigrated to the United States with their young daughter, Helen, in February 1940. After a six-day journey aboard the liner S. S. Manhattan and a week on Ellis Island, they arrived in New York City.

== After World War II ==
Shneiderman was politically committed to modern Jewish nationalism, Jewish identity, Yiddish culture, and Holocaust memory.

After World War II, Shneiderman promoted the publication of Holocaust survivors’ memoirs and testimonies, thereby contributing to making them available to a wider audience. In 1944, he edited the diary of Mary Berg, among the first eyewitness accounts of life and Nazi persecution in the Warsaw Ghetto. Written from the perspective of a teenage girl, Warsaw Ghetto: A Diary was published in English in 1945, and subsequently translated into Hebrew, Italian, and French. Although Mary Berg withdrew from public discussions, her story gained continued interest and was republished in subsequent editions, most recently by Oneworld Publications as The Diary of Mary Berg: Growing up in the Warsaw Ghetto in 2009.

Shneiderman also edited and published the diary of Gemma La Guardia Gluck, after encountering evidence on her arrest and incarceration as a political hostage while covering the 1961 Eichmann trial. Upon visiting her in Queens, New York, Shneiderman discovered she had kept a handwritten journal of her time in the Ravensbrück concentration camp. S.L. Shneiderman edited the manuscript and published it in 1961 under the title My Story.

In 1946, Shneiderman visited the postwar ruins of Poland. Out of this trip came two travelogues, Zvishn Shrek un Hofenung (English: Between Fear and Hope), and Ven di Vaysl hot geredt Yidish (English: The River Remembers, or When the Vistula Spoke Yiddish) published in Yiddish in 1970 and in English in 1978, for which Shneiderman was awarded the Bergen Belsen Remembrance Award. The travelogues document Jewish shtetl life in Poland from the 11th century to the 1970s, and the destruction wrought by the Nazis and Polish Communist rule on Jewish life. Shneiderman's work illustrates the many traces of pre-war Jewish life in Poland. Stopping in Łódź shortly after the Kielce pogrom, Shneiderman described the familiarity and foreignness of postwar Polish-Jewish life: local Jewish communities, decimated during the war, had been replaced by almost 25,000 Jewish repatriates from Russia.

Shneiderman was heavily invested in writing about Poland, Polish Jewry, and the fate of Jewish culture in Poland. Throughout his life, he continued to write about postwar Poland, reviewing the 1956 Polish uprising in The Warsaw Heresy, published in 1959. That same year, he gave then-Vice President Richard Nixon a tour of the Warsaw Ghetto on his official visit to Poland. In 1966, Shneiderman wrote the narration of the film The Last Chapter, directed by Benjamin and Lawrence Rothman. The film depicts the thousand-year history of Jewish life in Poland, shtetl life, and the richness of religious and secular Polish-Jewish culture. Theodore Bikel became the voice for Shneiderman's narration.

Shneiderman's later works continued to promote Jewish writers and artists. Shneiderman was president of the Yiddish P.E.N. in New York City, the Yiddish branch of the international writer's organization based in New York City. In 1968, he published a Yiddish biography of Ilya Ehrenburg (1891–1967), a Jewish Russian-language poet, novelist, and journalist whom he had met in interwar Paris and in Spain. In his biography, Shneiderman defended Ehrenburg from accusations of collaboration with Stalin in the destruction of Soviet Yiddish culture. In 1974, he edited a collection of original writings in Yiddish entitled Tsuzamen (English: Together). Shneiderman also promoted the candidacy of Yiddish writer Isaac Bashevis Singer for the 1978 Nobel Prize.

S.L. and Eileen Shneiderman maintained close connections with Polish-Jewish artists, writing a critical essay about Marc Chagall’s use of Christ imagery and work in cathedrals in France, celebrating the work of Chaim Goldberg, and publishing a 1980 book on the illustrator, miniaturist, and political cartoonist Arthur Szyk.

Shneiderman was a prolific writer and journalist, authoring hundreds of articles in the Yiddish and Anglophone Jewish press throughout his seventy-year career. He was deeply involved in New York journalistic circles. In 1948, he became one of the founding members of the United Nations Correspondents Association. After World War II, he began reporting for the Israeli paper Davar. Despite identifying in his youth with the Left Marxist-Zionist movement Linke poalei tsiyon, his writing transcended both left and right blocs of the Labor Zionist political spectrum. Throughout his career, Shneiderman was a regular contributor to the Yiddish-language Morgn-zhurnal (English: Morning Journal) and the Tog-morgn-zhurnal (Day-Morning Journal). His articles in English were featured in a wide variety of publications, including The New York Times, The National Jewish Monthly, The Reporter, Sunday Independent, McCall’s, East Europe, Problems of Communism, The New York Times Book Review, Hadassah, Congress-Bi-Weekly, Midstream, ADL Bulletin, The American Zionist, Jewish Frontier, Jewish Digest, The Forward, and Congress Monthly. He tackled diverse topics, ranging from Polish intellectuals and writers under Communist rule, to Yiddish in the USSR, and the portrait of Hungarian Marxist philosopher Georg Lukacs.

== Legacy ==
Shneiderman is now the object of renewed scholarly interest, with the Association for Jewish Studies sponsoring an interdisciplinary panel and conversation series on Shneiderman's journalistic work, politics, and legacy in October 2022.

In 1988, S.L. and Eileen Shneiderman donated their personal archives to the Institute for Diaspora Research at Tel Aviv University. After S.L. Shneiderman's death on October 8, 1996, Eileen donated their collection of 395 Yiddish books signed by their authors to the University of Maryland’s McKeldin Library. In 2001, Eileen Shneiderman published What Time is it on the Jewish Clock? (Tel Aviv: I.L. Peretz Publishers, 2001), a retrospective on her husband's work. Eileen Shneiderman died on November 30, 2004. She and her late husband are buried together in Israel.

In March 2007, two of S.L. Shneiderman's books were reprinted with additional materials. The new edition of the diary of Mary Berg was prepared by Susan Lee Pentlin, professor at Central Missouri State University, and re-titled The Diary of Mary Berg: Growing up in the Warsaw Ghetto. Gemma LaGuardia Gluck's diary was republished as Fiorello’s Sister: Gemma LaGuardia Gluck’s Story, in a newly expanded edition edited by Rochelle G. Saidel.

Shneiderman's coverage on the Spanish Civil War, originally published in Yiddish in 1938 as Krig in Shpanyen: Hinterland, was recently translated into Polish in 2021 and Spanish in 2023, with an English translation published in 2024.

== Notable publications ==
- Shneiderman, S.L. Gilderne Feigl [Eng: Golden Birds]. 1927.
- Shneiderman, S.L. Feyern in Shtot [Eng: Unrest in Town]. 1932.
- Shneiderman, S.L. Krig in Shpanyen: Hinterland [Eng. War in the Spanish Hinterlands]. Warsaw, Poland: Yiddish Universal Library, 1938.
- Mary Berg, Warsaw Ghetto: A Diary. Edited by S. L. Shneiderman. trans. Sylvia Glass. New York: L. B. Fischer, 1945. [Reprinted as The Diary of Mary Berg: Growing up in the Warsaw Ghetto. Edited by Susan Lee Pentlin. London: Oneworld Publications, 2007.]
- Shneiderman, S.L. Zvishn Shrek un Hofenung [Eng. Between Fear and Hope]. Buenos Aires: Union Central Israelita Polaca, 1947.
- Shneiderman, S.L. The Warsaw Heresy. New York: Horizon Press, 1959.
- Gemma LaGuardia Gluck. My Story. Edited by S.L. Shneiderman. Philadelphia: D. McKay Co, 1961. [Republished as Fiorello’s Sister: Gemma LaGuardia Gluck’s Story. Edited by Rochelle G. Saidel. New York: Syracuse University Press, 2007]
- Shneiderman, S.L. Ilye Erenburg [Eng: Ilya Ehrenburg]. New York: Yidisher Kempfer, 1968.
- Shneiderman, S.L. Ṿen di Ṿisl hoṭ geredṭ Yidish (Eng. The River Remembers, or When the Vistula Spoke Yiddish). Tel Aviv: I.L. Peretz, 1970.
- Shneiderman, S.L. ed. Tsuzamen [Eng. Together]. Tel Aviv: I.L. Peretz, 1974.
- Schneiderman, S.L., “Chagall – Torn?” Midstream (June–July 1977): 49
- Shneiderman, S.L. Arthur Szyk. Tel Aviv: I.L. Peretz, 1980.

== Further references ==
- Engel, David (1996) observations by S. L. Shneiderman and Shimon Samet. Beyn shakhror l’brikha: nitsuley hashoah b’Polin v’hameavek al hanehgatem, 1944–1946. Tel Aviv: Am Oved.
- Estraikh, Gennady (2008) Yiddish in the Cold War. London: Legenda.
- Hoberman, J. (1991) Bridge of Light: Yiddish Films Between Two Worlds. New York: Museum of Modern Art.
- Klotz, Anne-Christin (2022) Gemeinsam gegen Deutschland: Warschaus jiddische Presse im Kampf gegen den Nationalsozialismus (1930–1941).
- Kozłowska, Magdalena, and Karolina Koprowska, eds. (2021) S. L. Sznajderman, Wojna w Hiszpanii. Reportaż z Głębi Kraju. trans. Magdalena Kozłowska. Warsaw: Czarne.
- Kugelmass, Jack (2014) Sifting the Ruins: Émigré Jewish Journalists’ Return Visits to the Old Country, 1946–1948. David W. Belin Lecture in American Jewish Affairs. Ann Arbor, Michigan: University of Michigan, The Jean and Samuel Frankel Center for Judaic Studies.
- Kugelmass, Jack (2019) Strange Encounters: Expat and Refugee Polish-Jewish Journalists in Poland and Germany Shortly After World War II. In Juden und Nichtjuden Nach der Shoah: Begegnungen in Deutschland (Europäisch-Jüdische Studien-Beiträge). eds. Stefanie Fischer, Nathanael Riemer and Stefanie Schüler-Springorum. pp. 31–47. Oldenberg: De Gruyter.
- Lansky, Aaron (2004) Outwitting History. New York City: Algonquin Books.
- Naggar, Carole (2022) David “Chim” Seymour: Searching for the Light, 1911–1956. Oldenbourg: De Gruyter.
- Sinkoff, Nancy (2024) “Biography as Hesped: Sh. L. Shneiderman’s Homage to Ilya Ehrenburg.” In A Jew in the Street: New Perspectives on European Jewish History, eds. Nancy Sinkoff, Howard Lupovitch, James Loeffler, and Jonathan Karp. Detroit, MI: Wayne State University Press.
- Wiesel, Elie (1996) Memoirs: All Rivers Run to the Sea. London: Shocken.
