= Remember the Women =

American historical research organization

Remember the Women Institute
- Abbreviation: RTWI
- Formation: 1997
- Legal status: 501(c)(3) nonprofit organization
- Headquarters: New York City
- Executive Director: Rochelle Saidel
- Website: www.rememberwomen.org

The Remember the Women Institute is an organization that researches and educates about women’s contributions and actions in history, especially during the Holocaust. It is based in New York City.

== History ==
Dr. Rochelle G. Saidel created the Remember the Women Institute in 1997 to document the often untold stories of women in the Holocaust. Saidel has stated that the inspiration for the organization came from her grandmothers, as well as from a 1980 visit to Ravensbrück concentration camp. In 2001, the exhibit “Women of Ravensbrück: portraits of courage, art by Julia Terwilliger” was created by the Institute and opened at the Florida Holocaust Museum. It was later shown at several other Holocaust centers in the United States. In 2012, Remember the Women Institute and the USC Shoah Foundation co-sponsored a historic symposium about sexual violence during the Holocaust. That same year, several advisory board members of Remember the Women, as well as executive board members Saidel and Dr. Sonja Hedgepeth, signed a letter to UN Secretary-General Ban Ki-moon, urging him to acknowledge sexual violence during the Holocaust. Three years later, the institute launched an online resource handbook for Holocaust education through theater, “Women, Theater, and the Holocaust,” edited by Saidel and Karen Shulman. At yearly programs for the several editions of the resource handbook, Professor Meghan Brodie’s students from Ursinus College performed the stories of women in the Holocaust for Remember the Women Institute events. The Institute made news in 2018 with the “VIOLATED! Women in Holocaust and Genocide” international art exhibition, which focused on sexual abuse against women during the Holocaust. It was shown at the Ronald Feldman Gallery in New York City. In addition, the Institute has organized its own conferences, and has hosted and participated in panels and workshops at international conferences on the Holocaust and Jewish history throughout the world. In 2020, it co-sponsored the International Conference “Depicting Violated Jewish Women During the Holocaust” at Bar Ilan University in Israel. In addition to the Holocaust, the Institute has studied genocides, conflicts, and domestic violence in Rwanda, Sudan, Srebrenica, Guatemala, and Iraq, as well as domestic violence in those locations. Publications include a catalog for the VIOLATED! Women in Holocaust and Genocide exhibition, edited by Saidel and Dr. Batya Brutin, as well as books co-published with university presses. Among the often forgotten heroic women whose stories have been highlighted by Remember the Women Institute are Haviva Reick, Gemma La Guardia Gluck, Olga Benario Prestes, and Kathe Leichter.
