= Lauren Wolfe =

American journalist

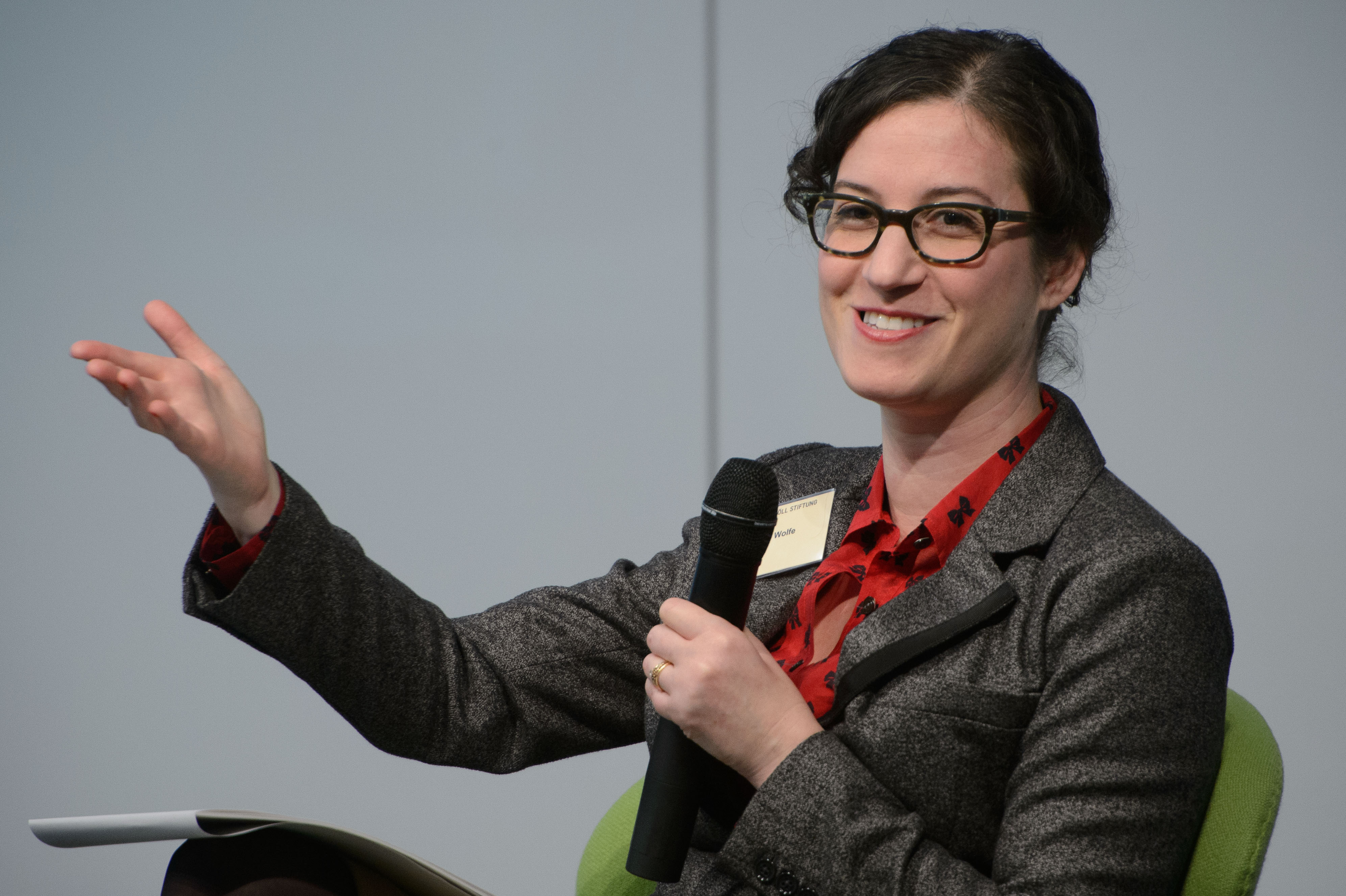
Wolfe in 2013

Lauren Wolfe is an American journalist known for her coverage of wartime sexual violence.

== Early life ==
Wolfe studied at Wesleyan University and the Columbia University Graduate School of Journalism.

== Career ==
In the 2000s, Wolfe reported on the September 11 attacks for books published by The New York Times.

Wolfe was the senior editor of the Committee to Protect Journalists.

Beginning in September 2011, Wolfe directed the Women Under Siege Project of the Women's Media Center, which documents wartime sexual violence. In 2012, she received the Frank Ochberg Award for Media and Trauma Study. Her reporting about a mass rape in eastern Congo in 2016 is credited with leading to the arrest of the perpetrators.

Wolfe worked for The New York Times' live coverage of the COVID-19 pandemic and the 2020 U.S. elections. In January 2021, she was the subject of a conservative harassment campaign after she tweeted that she had "chills" seeing Joe Biden's plane land at Joint Base Andrews ahead of his presidential inauguration. The Times ended her contract shortly thereafter, prompting discussion on its social media policy.

Wolfe then launched a Substack newsletter, Chills, in which she writes about international investigative journalism. She was a columnist at Foreign Policy and is a contributing writer to Washington Monthly, as well as an adjunct professor at the New York University School of Journalism.

== Personal life ==
Wolfe lived in New York City before moving to Seattle, Washington, in 2021. She was diagnosed with PTSD stemming from her reporting. She identifies as queer. She has dogs as pets.
