= Queensbridge Houses =

Public housing development in Queens, New York

- NYCHA property
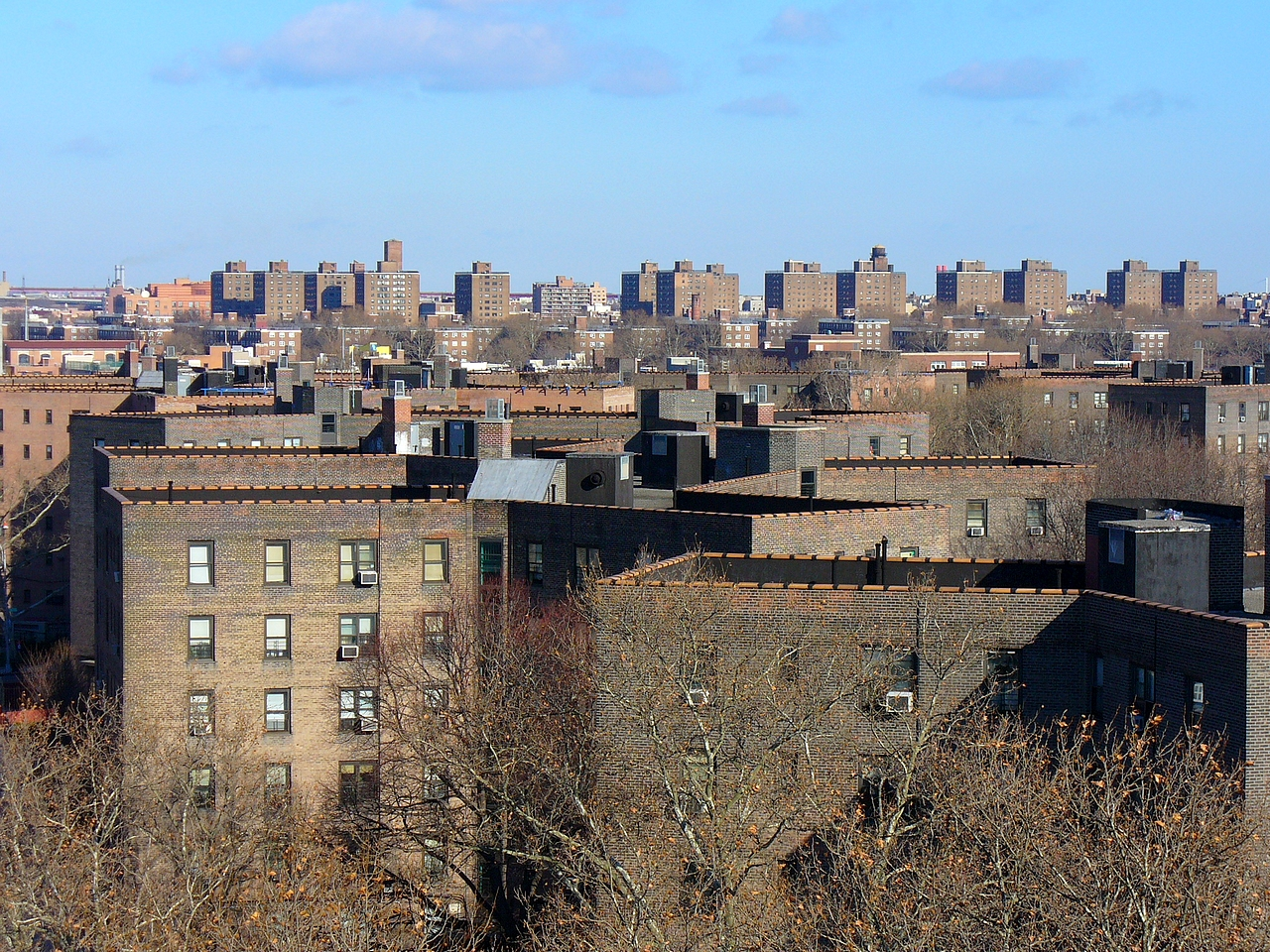
- Nicknames: Queensbridge, QB, The Bridge, and The Projects
- Location within New York City
- Coordinates: 40.755°N 73.945°W
- Country: United States
- State: New York
- City: New York City
- Borough: Queens
- ZIP Code: 11101
- Area codes: 718, 347, 929, and 917

Queensbridge Houses, also known simply as Queensbridge or QB, is a public housing development in the Long Island City neighborhood of Queens, New York City. Owned by the New York City Housing Authority, the development contains 96 buildings and 3,142 units accommodating approximately 7,000 people in two separate complexes (North and South). The complex opened in 1939 and is the largest housing project in North America.

Queensbridge is located in Queens Community District 1, and its ZIP Code is 11101.

== Structures ==
Queensbridge, the largest of 26 public housing developments in Queens, is located between Vernon Boulevard, which runs along the East River, and 21st Street. It is immediately south of the Ravenswood power plant and just north of the Queensboro Bridge, for which the complex is named. The complex is the largest housing project in North America. The development is separated into two complexes, the North Houses on 40th Avenue and the South Houses on 41st Avenue. The namesake station of the New York City Subway's IND 63rd Street Line (F and M trains) is on the eastern side of the complex on 21st Street.

=== Buildings ===
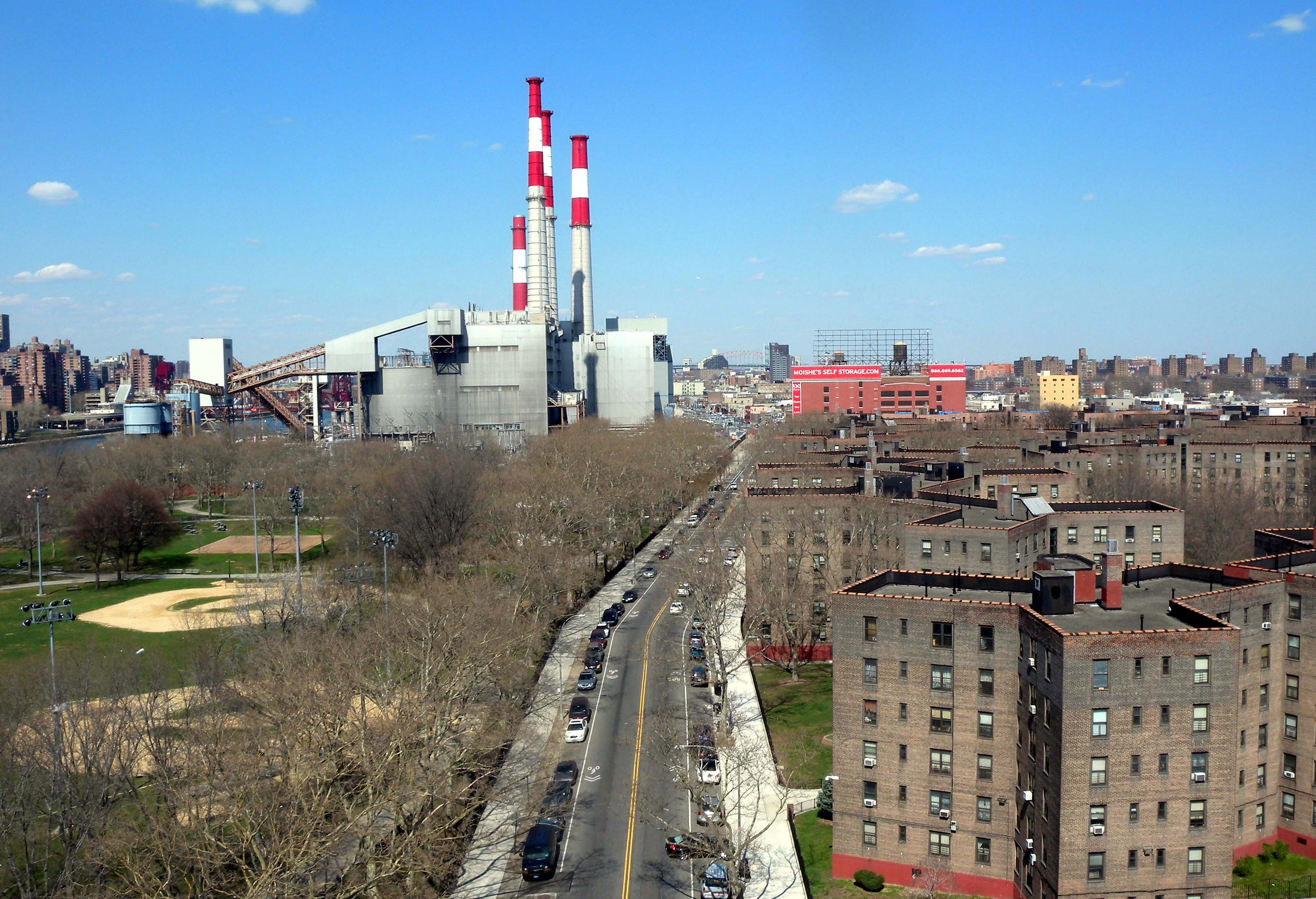
Queensbridge (right), Queensbridge Park (left), and Ravenswood Generating Station (background)

The 96-unit, six-story buildings are distinctive due to their shape of two Y's connecting at the base. This shape was used as the architects hoped it would give residents more access to privacy and sunlight than the traditional cross-shape. The design was said to be cost-efficient, and they reduced the cost even further by using elevators that only stopped at the 1st, 3rd, and 5th floors. Political pressure to keep costs down was a key reason for the use of cheap designs. W.F.R. Ballard, Henry S. Churchill, Frederick G. Frost, and Burnett Turner designed Queensbridge.

In many aspects, the buildings of Queensbridge are very similar to most government-built housing projects of the era. They are a worn grayish brown which now suffers noticeable deterioration and weathering. Each building is painted red to about four feet up from the ground, giving a united feel to the entire complex as a uniform red "layer" is always close, throughout the complex. On each of the corners in Queensbridge, the New York City Housing Authority has posted signs indicating the project's name and management: "Queensbridge North (or South) NYCHA." These signs come in several varieties depending on their age. The oldest signs, erected in the early nineties, are simply orange and blue, with the newer signs featuring graphics, like those of many other projects.

Access to buildings in the complex is by key or via an intercom system. The halls of Queensbridge's buildings are comparable to most municipal buildings, and are dilapidated and lined with worn light blue tiles. Apartments are painted white and are fairly small, even by New York City standards. Elevators have been rebuilt and now stop at floors 1, 2, 3, 4, and 5 and kitchens have been completely renovated and now have frost-free refrigerators. Three thousand bathrooms were renovated with new tubs, toilets, vanities, floor tile and lighting in 2000. This followed a renovation in 1986 when 1,000 of the bathrooms were renovated by Arc Plumbing.

=== Amenities ===
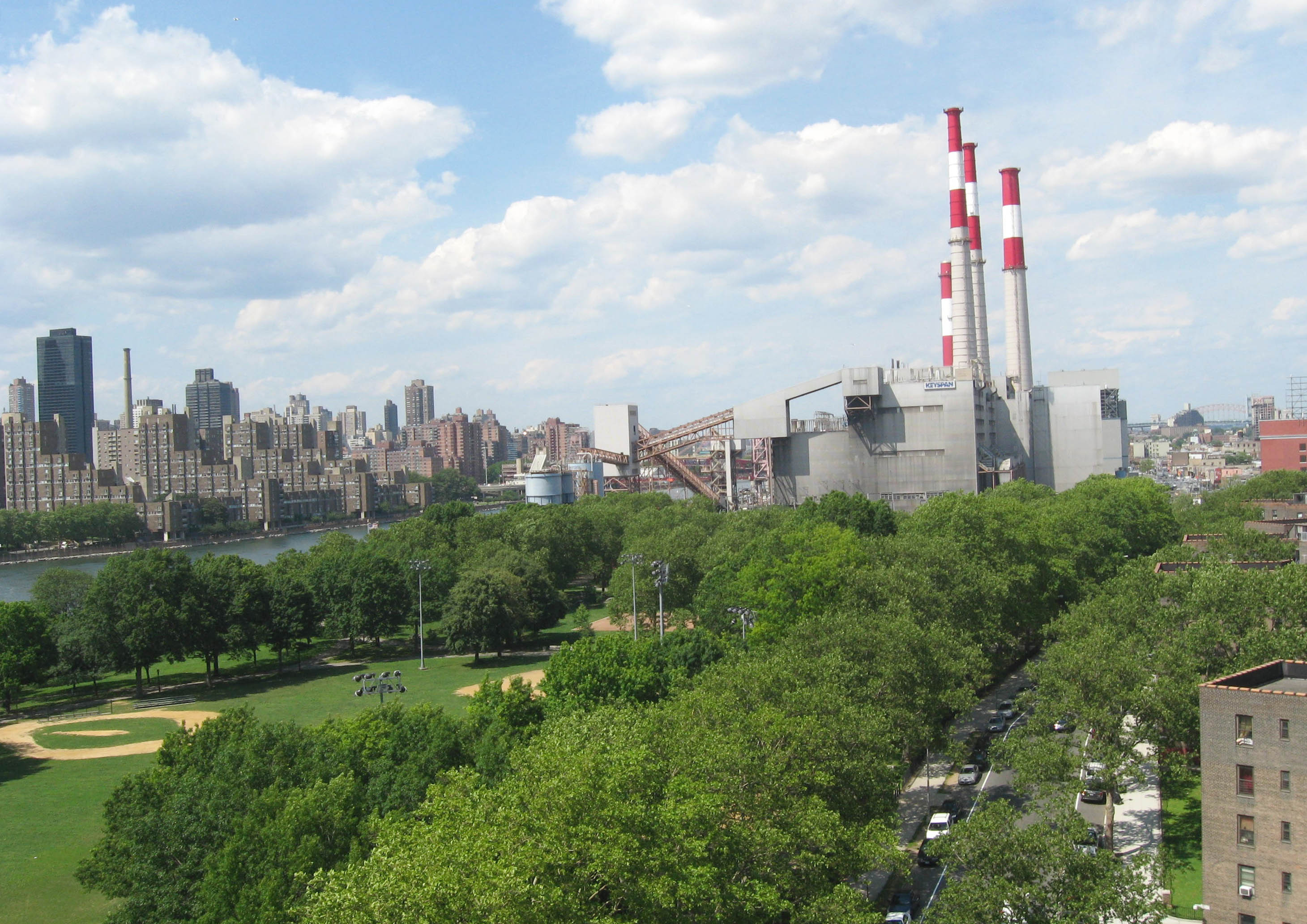
Queensbridge Park

The original plans included some basic amenities, like a central shopping center, a nursery and six inner courtyards for play. In the 1950s, there were also three playschool rooms, a library, a community center with an auditorium where shows were put on, a gymnasium with a wooden floor that doubled as a wooden-wheels roller skating rink, activity rooms downstairs, and a cafeteria upstairs where the playschool children ate their lunches. Some of the downstairs activities included tap dancing, ballet, art, playing the recorder and singing, pool, knock hockey and table tennis, as well as Girl Scout and Boy Scout meetings. Residents enjoyed concerts during the hot summer months in the square central shopping area, and the Fresh Air Fund sent children on trips out to the Peekskill mountains.

The buildings in the complex are divided by a series of paths and small lawns. Also in the complex are several basketball courts and play areas lined with benches. Across Vernon Boulevard lies Queensbridge Park, the primary place of recreation for tenants of the project. There was also a smaller park placed conveniently right under the Queensboro Bridge called "Baby Park". Baby Park was closed due to debris falling from the bridge during maintenance work in the late 2000s. Baby Park was replaced by a new playground for the same age range, between 40th-41st Avenues, within Queensbridge Park itself.

== History and crime statistics ==
Queensbridge opened in 1939. During the 1950s, the management changed the racial balance of Queensbridge by transferring all families whose income was more than $3,000/year, a majority of whom were White, to middle-income housing projects, and replacing most of these tenants with African-American and Latino families. This policy provided safe and sanitary housing to many low-income African-American and Latino families.

Queensbridge is well known for its contributions to hip hop and rap music, and has been home to some of the most influential musicians in the genre. Marley Marl Williams was the first in a long succession of acclaimed artists from "The Bridge", which came to be one of the most famous hip hop neighborhoods in the country. Its rappers and producers helped to put it on the map. The Juice Crew collective, hugely influential in the 1980s, featured among its members Queensbridge rappers MC Shan, Roxanne Shanté and Craig G.

While the Boogie Down Productions-MC Shan dispute had already put "The Bridge" on the rap map in the 1980s, the new crop of Queensbridge rappers like Nas and Mobb Deep made frequent references to the Queensbridge Houses that cemented its reputation as a dystopian vision of poverty, drugs, and violence just as New York City's problems with crack cocaine and the unprecedented carnage it had brought to places like Queensbridge reached a peak. Nas' 1994 album Illmatic, often regarded as the greatest hip-hop album of all time, concerns his experiences in Queensbridge. Other notable artists associated with the Queensbridge hip hop scene include Blaq Poet, Cormega, Tragedy Khadafi, Nature, Screwball, Capone, and Big Noyd.

Regarding the Queensbridge music scene, XXL columnist Brendan Frederick wrote:

At a time when you can buy screwed & chopped albums at Circuit City in Brooklyn, it’s easy to lose sight of the fact that hip-hop was once a local phenomenon. More than just a voice of the ghetto, hip-hop at its best is the voice of specific blocks, capturing the distinct tone and timbre of an artist’s environment. Since the 1980s, New York City’s Queensbridge Housing Project has been documented perhaps better than any other geographic location. Starting with super producer Marley Marl’s dominant Juice Crew in the ’80s all the way through ’90s mainstays like Nas, Cormega and Capone, the Bridge has produced the highest per-capita talent of any ’hood.

By the 1970s, Queensbridge experienced a rise in crime with the rest of the city. During the height of the crack epidemic in 1986, Queensbridge experienced more murders than any NYCHA complex in New York City. However, in the 2000s, crime went down.

For many years Queensbridge has had a problem with drug dealers and drug users. An 11-month police investigation led to the arrest of 37 people during a drug bust in February 2005. Another raid in February 2009, following a seven-month investigation, resulted in 59 arrests.

== Population ==
As of 2013, Queensbridge had a total population of 6,105. The racial breakdown was 61.4% black, 2.3% white, 1.9% Asian, 1.0% American Indian and 2.4% multiracial. Hispanics and Latinos of any race were 30.1%.

By 2020, the Asian population in Queensbridge rose to 11% of the development's total population. This prompted calls for better social services for the community's Asian residents.

== Notable people ==
- Big Noyd (born 1975), rapper, affiliated with Mobb Deep
- Blaq Poet (born 1969), rapper
- Bravehearts, rap group
- Capone (born 1976), rapper, half of the hip-hop group Capone-N-Noreaga
- Cormega (born 1970), rapper
- Craig G (born 1973), rapper
- Julie Dash (born 1952), filmmaker and writer.
- Lou Del Valle (born 1968), professional boxer.
- Vern Fleming (born 1962), former NBA basketball player who played for the Indiana Pacers and New Jersey Nets.
- Bernard Fowler (born 1960), background vocalist for the Rolling Stones and spoken word artist.
- Gemma La Guardia Gluck (1881–1962) Holocaust survivor and sister of New York City Mayor Fiorello La Guardia
- Sean Green (born 1970), former NBA basketball player
- Mobb Deep, rap duo
- Tragedy Khadafi (born 1971), rapper.
- Infamous Mobb, rap group
- Marley Marl (born 1962), music producer
- MC Shan (born 1965), rapper
- Mel Johnson Jr., actor and film producer
- Nas (born 1973), rapper
- Jungle (Jabari Fret) (born 1974), rapper
- Nature (born 1973), rapper
- Metta Sandiford-Artest (born 1979), NBA basketball player, rapper.
- Keechant Sewell (born 1972), former Chief of Detectives for the Nassau County Police Department, and 45th New York City Police Commissioner
- Roxanne Shante (born 1969), rapper
- Screwball, hip-hop group
- Andy Walker (born 1955), small forward who played in the NBA for the New Orleans Jazz.

== See also ==
- Queensbridge Park
- New York City Housing Authority
- List of New York City Housing Authority properties

=== Other important housing projects and blocks in hip-hop culture ===
- Bankhead Courts (ATL)
- Bowen Homes (ATL)
- Bronx River Houses (NYC)
- Calliope Projects (NOLA)
- Castle Hill (NYC)
- Magnolia Projects (NOLA)
- Marcy Projects (NYC)
- O'Block (Chicago)
- Soundview (NYC)
