= 63rd Street Tunnel =

Tunnel under the East River in New York City

- The 63rd Street Tunnel, in the context of the East Side Access project
- Interactive map of 63rd Street Tunnel

Overview
- Line: 63rd Street Line (F and M trains); Main Line (LIRR trains)
- Location: East River between Manhattan and Queens, New York City
- Coordinates: 40°45′36″N 73°57′18″W
- System: New York City Subway; Long Island Rail Road

Operation
- Opened: October 29, 1989; 37 years ago (upper level); January 25, 2023; 3 years ago (lower level)
- Operator: Metropolitan Transportation Authority

Technical
- Length: 3,140 feet (960 m) between shafts
- No. of tracks: 4 (2 subway, 2 LIRR)
- Track gauge: 4 ft 8 1/2 in (1,435 mm) standard gauge
- Electrified: Third rail, 600 V DC (upper level); Third rail, 750 V DC (lower level)
- Width: 38.5 feet (11.7 m)

The 63rd Street Tunnel is a double-deck subway and railroad tunnel under the East River between the boroughs of Manhattan and Queens in New York City. Opened in 1989, it is the newest of the East River tunnels, as well as the newest rail river crossing in the New York metropolitan area. The upper level of the 63rd Street Tunnel carries the IND 63rd Street Line of the New York City Subway. The lower level carries Long Island Rail Road (LIRR) trains to Grand Central as part of the East Side Access project.

Construction of the 63rd Street Tunnel began in 1969. The tunnel was holed through beneath Roosevelt Island in 1972, but completion of the tunnel and its connections was delayed by the 1975 New York City fiscal crisis. The upper level was opened in 1989, twenty years after construction started. The lower level was not opened at that time because of the cancellation of the LIRR route to Manhattan. The tunnel was long referred to as the "tunnel to nowhere" because its Queens end did not connect to any other subway line until 2001. Construction on the East Side Access project, which uses the lower level, started in 2006; the lower level opened on January 25, 2023. During construction, the lower level was used to move materials between the work sites in Manhattan and staging areas in Queens.

== History ==
=== Planning ===
In February 1963, the New York City Transit Authority (NYCTA) proposed a two-track East River subway tunnel under 76th Street with unspecified connections to the rest of the transit network, at a cost of $139 million. The proposed site of the tunnel was switched to 59th Street on a May 2, 1963, report. On May 24, Mayor Wagner suggested that a tunnel around 61st Street "be built with all deliberate speed". Several months later, on October 17, the Board of Estimate approved a new East River tunnel sited at 64th Street, noting that it would cost $30 million and take seven years to build. The 64th Street site was said to be $5.3 million less expensive, "because of easier grades and smaller curves". The route was changed to 63rd Street because officials at Rockefeller Institute at 64th Street feared that vibrations from heavy construction and train movements might interfere with the institute's delicate instruments and the research being conducted.

A third track was added to the plans for the tunnel in April 1966. The track would serve Long Island Rail Road (LIRR) trains to east Midtown, alleviating train traffic into Pennsylvania Station. That August, a fourth track was added to the plans after it was determined that LIRR trains would be too large to run on subway tracks. This amendment increased the number of LIRR tracks to two, and provided dedicated tracks for the LIRR and the subway. In November 1967, voters approved a $2.5 billion transportation bond issue, and in early 1968, under the Program for Action, officials provided detailed plans for how it would be used. Among many other projects, the proposal included the construction of the 63rd Street Tunnel to host a proposed 63rd Street–Southeast Queens subway line on the upper level (connecting to a "super-express" line and the Archer Avenue lines in Queens), and an LIRR branch traveling to a new railroad terminal in Manhattan on the lower level.

=== Construction ===
Construction on the project began on November 24, 1969; the Kiewit Corporation was the main contractor. Four 38-foot-square (12 m) prefabricated sections of the 63rd Street Tunnel were constructed at Port Deposit, Maryland, then towed to New York and sunk under the East River. The first of the tunnel segments was delivered in May 1971 and was lowered into place on August 29, 1971; the last section was lowered on March 14, 1972. The double-deck, 3,140-foot (960 m) tunnel under the East River was "holed through" on October 10, 1972, with the separate sections of tunnels being connected. The estimated cost of the project was $341 million, and the MTA applied for $227 million in federal funds.

One section of the tunnel was controversial because it called for 1,500 feet (460 m) of cut-and-cover tunneling, which would require digging an open trench through Central Park in Manhattan. In June 1970, Mayor John Lindsay told city engineers to write a report that studied ways to reduce the project's impact. The results of the report, released in January 1971, called for using tunnel boring machines underneath Central Park to reduce disruption. The following month, the NYCTA published advertisements in newspapers, seeking construction bids for the tunnels under Central Park, but withdrew them after objections from community and conservation groups. The NYCTA agreed to halve the width of the proposed 75-foot (23 m)-wide cut, which resulted in a proportionate decrease in the area of affected parkland. The NYCTA also agreed to reduce disruption to the Heckscher Playground, located above the proposed subway tunnel's path, by cutting construction time from three years to two years and by constructing a temporary playground nearby. The sections that connected to the existing Broadway and Sixth Avenue Lines were holed through on October 11, 1973. Construction on the section between 5th Avenue and Park Avenue began in August 1974. The project involved digging a 45-foot (14 m)-high cavern underneath the street.

On March 20, 1975, New York mayor Abraham Beame announced significant cutbacks to the plan. Construction of the Southeastern Queens extension was deferred until 1981, and the Long Island Rail Road extension through the lower level of the 63rd Street tunnel was canceled for the foreseeable future. The tunnel was 95% complete by January 1976, but later that year, the NYCTA announced that "it will take an extra five or six years—until 1987 or 1988—to complete the new Manhattan–Queens trunk subway line from Central Park to Jamaica via the new 63rd Street tunnel." The main cause of the delay was a proposed 5.8-mile "super express" bypass in Queens. The upper level was completed in 1976, but due to the 1975 New York City fiscal crisis, there was no funding to extend the tunnel in Queens east of the 21st Street–Queensbridge station.

The New York Times reported that the lower level of the 63rd Street Tunnel was still under construction by 1976, even though it would remain unused indefinitely. Richard Ravitch, the MTA chairman, said that to stop the work was "so costly as to make it impractical subsequent to the construction of the subway portion." Therefore, the lower level of the 63rd Street Tunnel was completed along with the upper subway level, but could not be used due to its lack of connections at both ends. In 1979, the MTA started studying four options for making the upper level of the tunnel more useful. The ultimately agreed-on plan was to connect the tunnel to the local tracks of the IND Queens Boulevard Line in Queens, at a cost of $222 million, and a timetable of at least eight years.

By June 1985, the project was again delayed indefinitely after it was found that the tunnel had been flooded with 6 feet (1.8 m) of water, and several girders and electrical equipment had also deteriorated. Two contractors were hired to assess the structural integrity of the tunnel, and the delay was estimated at two years. By February 1987, the MTA's contractors had concluded that the tunnel was structurally sound, although federal funding had not yet been released. The MTA approved a new plan to have the tunnel open to 21st Street/Queensbridge by October 1989.

=== Opening of upper level ===
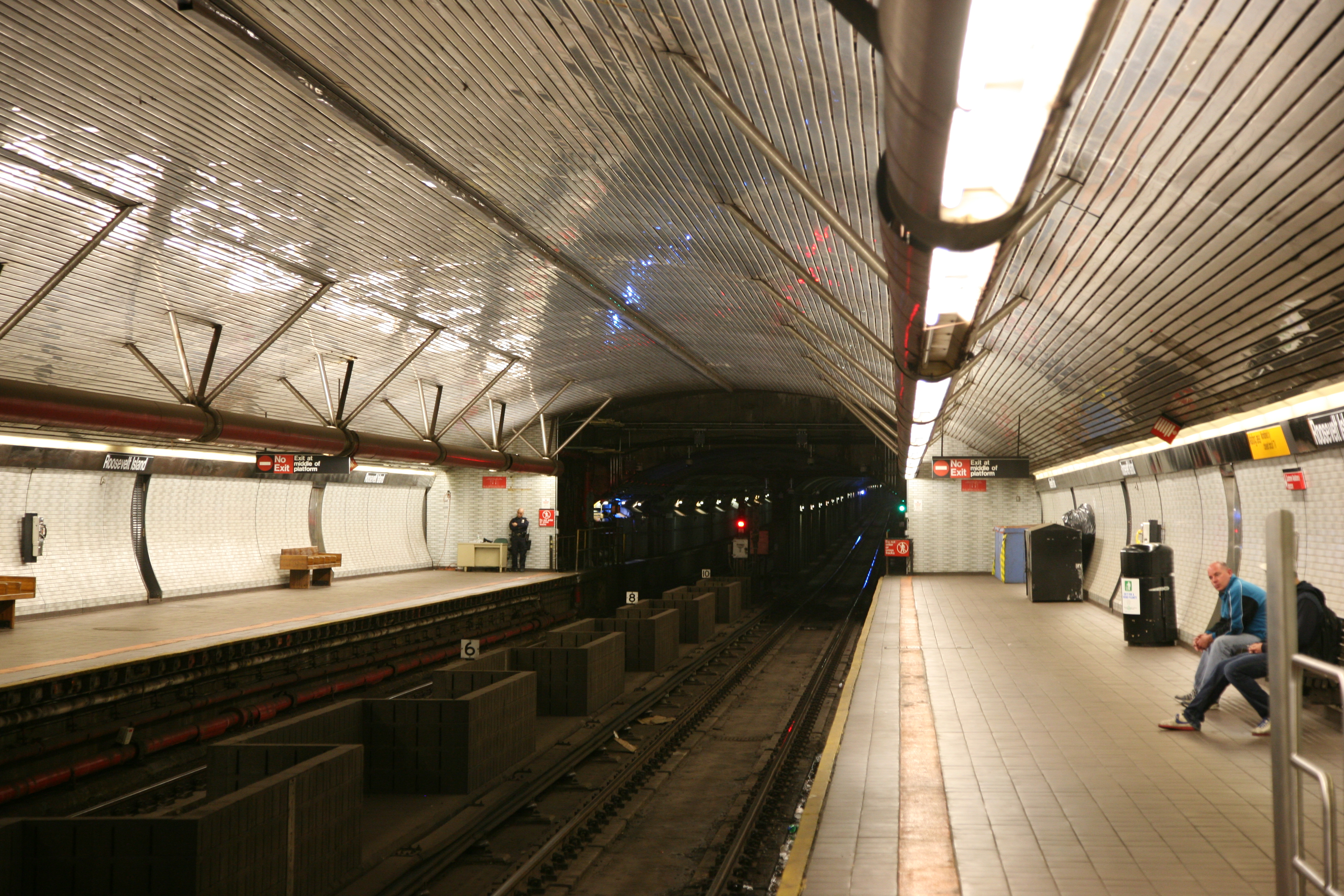
The Roosevelt Island station

The IND 63rd Street Line went into service on October 29, 1989, twenty years after construction began, with new stations at Lexington Avenue, Roosevelt Island, and 21st Street/41st Avenue in Queens. The 1,500-foot (460 m) connector to the Queens Boulevard Line had not yet started construction. It was nicknamed the "tunnel to nowhere" due to its lack of connections in Queens.

Planning for the connection to the IND Queens Boulevard Line began in December 1990, with the final design contract awarded in December 1992. Two build alternatives were evaluated: a connection to the local tracks of the Queens Boulevard Line, and a connection to the local and express tracks. The goal of the project was to increase capacity on Queens Boulevard by 33% and to eliminate the dead-end terminal at 21st Street–Queensbridge. Bellmouths were constructed to allow for a future bypass line through Sunnyside Yard. The remaining section from 21st Street to the Queens Boulevard Line, which cost $645 million, began construction on September 22, 1994. The construction project involved a number of other elements, such as extending the lower level LIRR tunnel and widening the Queens Boulevard Line tunnel above. In December 2000, the 63rd Street Connector was opened for construction reroutes, and opened for off-peak reroutes on January 13, 2001. while signal work was performed in the 53rd Street Tunnel. Regular service was expected to begin by August or September of that year, but the September 11, 2001, terrorist attacks delayed the commencement of regular service. The connector came into regular use on December 16, 2001.

=== Completion of lower level ===
Plans were made in 1995 to bring LIRR service to East Midtown, and had resurfaced by the turn of the century. By that time, the LIRR was the busiest commuter railroad in the United States, with an average of 269,400 passengers each weekday in 1999. Penn Station, located on the West Side, was operating at capacity due to a complex track interlocking and limited capacity in the East River Tunnels. In 1999, the MTA proposed a $17 billion five-year capital budget, which included a $1.6 billion LIRR connection to a new station under Grand Central Terminal, to be built as part of a project called East Side Access. The project's final environmental impact assessment (FEIS) was released in March 2001. (Note: For the full FEIS, see: "East Side Access Final Environmental Impact Statement: Overview". mta.info. Metropolitan Transportation Authority. March 6, 2001..) Two months later, the Federal Transit Administration (FTA) gave a favorable "Record of Decision", a mark of approval, to East Side Access after reviewing the project's FEIS. The September 11 attacks underscored the need to bring LIRR service to Grand Central. As LIRR president Kenneth J. Bauer stated, "If something happened at the East River tunnel, you wouldn't be able to run trains to Penn Station." In 2002, Congress passed a bill that allocated $132 million for infrastructure projects in New York State, of which $14.7 million was to go toward funding East Side Access. Approval of a final design for East Side Access was granted in 2002, and the first properties for East Side Access were acquired in 2003.

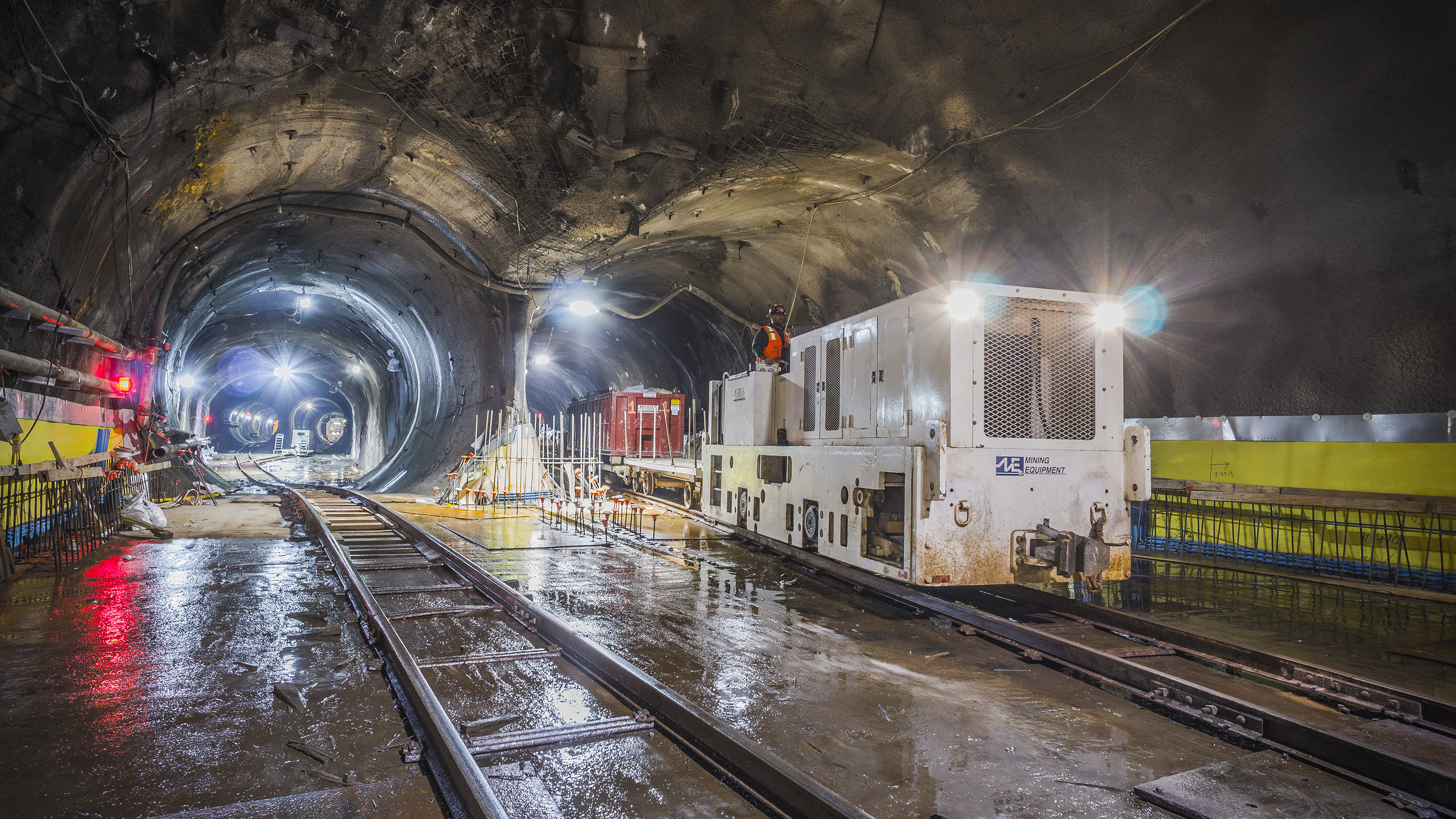
A tunnel cavern deep under Park Avenue, which now houses a switch to the north of the Grand Central LIRR station. During construction, the temporary narrow gauge tracks ran through the 63rd Street Tunnel's lower level to a staging area in Queens.

The construction contract for a 1-mile (1.6 km) tunnel in Manhattan westward and southward from the dormant lower level of the 63rd Street Tunnel to the new 100-foot-deep (30 m) station beneath Grand Central Terminal was awarded in July 2006. The first tunnel boring machine was launched westbound then southbound from the 63rd Street Tunnel in September 2007, and it reached Grand Central Terminal in July 2008. The second machine began boring a parallel tunnel in December 2007 and had completed its tunnel at 37th Street on September 30, 2008.

On the Queens side, work included extending the tunnel under Northern Boulevard and boring four tunnels under Sunnyside Yard. This was a particularly delicate and expensive task due to the existence of the elevated BMT Astoria Line and the underground IND Queens Boulevard Line directly above. A temporary narrow-gauge railway and a conveyor belt system were constructed behind the tunnel boring machines and through the 63rd Street Tunnels to the Queens bell mouth. An $83 million cut structure was built, which extends the tracks under Northern Boulevard into the Sunnyside Yard, and then was covered with a deck. In September 2009, the MTA awarded Granite-Traylor-Frontiere Joint Venture a $659.2 million contract to employ two 500-ton slurry tunnel boring machines to create the tunnels connecting the LIRR Main Line and the Port Washington Branch to the 63rd Street Tunnel under 41st Avenue. The four tunnels, with precast concrete liners, total 2 miles (3.2 km) in length. The two tunnel boring machines began digging on the Queens side in April 2011. On December 22, 2011, breakthrough was achieved in Tunnel "A" of the four Queens tunnel drives from the 63rd Street Tunnel bellmouth. By July 25, 2012, all four Queens tunnel drives were complete.

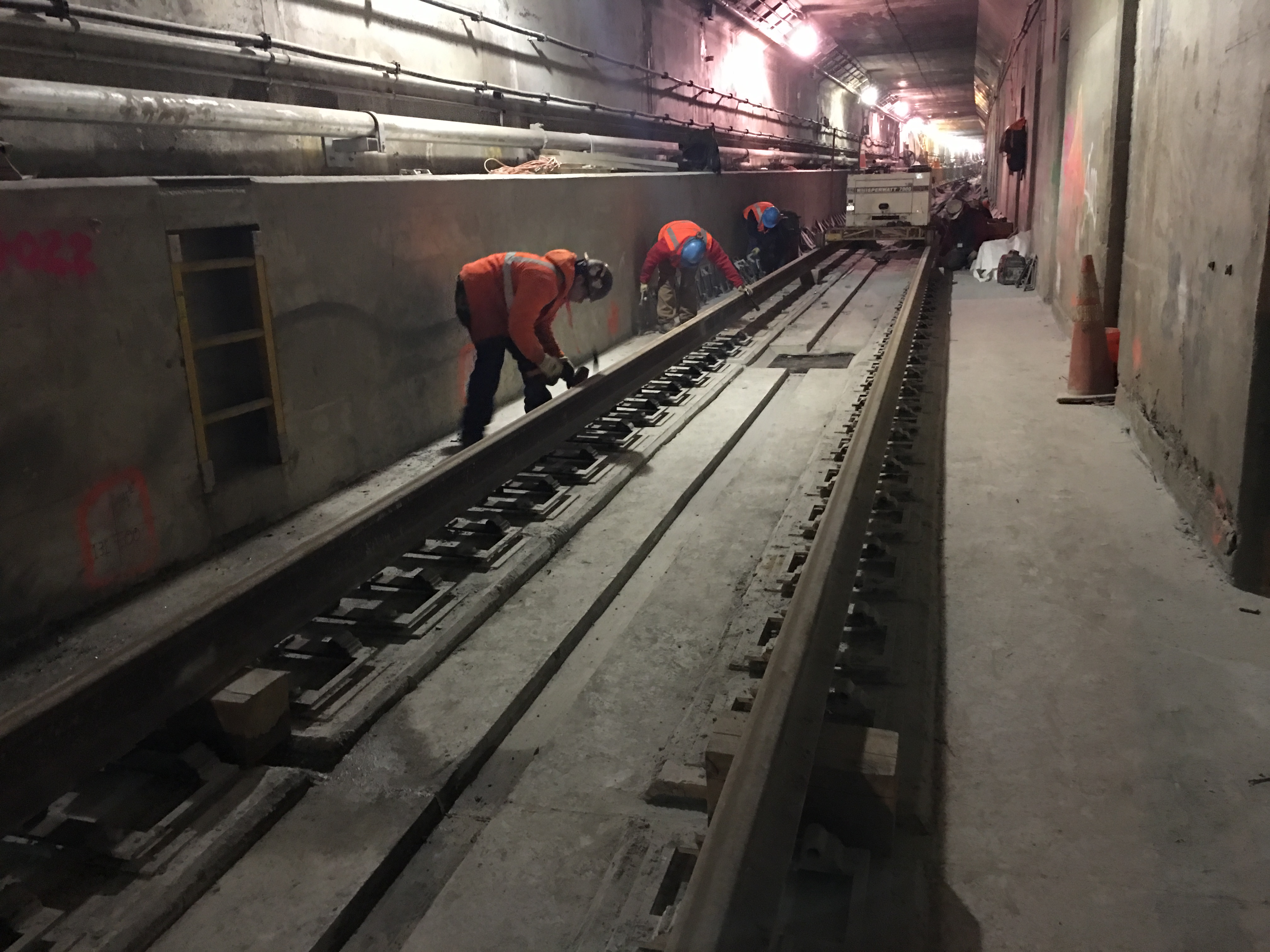
Lower level tracks

The project was initially scheduled to be completed by 2009, but the opening date was pushed back several times, finally opening on January 25, 2023. The MTA upgraded cellular service within the Grand Central Madison station and surrounding tunnels in late 2023. Additionally, at the time of the Grand Central Madison station's opening, the LIRR did not own a "rescue locomotive" that was small enough to tow disabled passenger trains through the 63rd Street Tunnel; its existing locomotives could only fit the larger dimensions of the East River Tunnels. In early 2024, the MTA board voted to buy a battery-powered locomotive that could fit in the tunnel.

== Construction methods ==
The 63rd Street Tunnel's river portions were built using the immersed tube method. Trenches were dug in the river bed, and four 375-foot (114 m) long prefabricated concrete sections of tunnel fabricated in Port Deposit, Maryland were floated into position and then sunk into the trenches. Two tubes were placed on each side of Roosevelt Island, each of which were 38-foot-square (12 m) prefabricated sections. The tubes extended 3,140 feet (960 m) under the water, from 63rd Street and FDR Drive on the Manhattan waterfront to 41st Avenue and Vernon Boulevard on the Queens waterfront. The construction shafts at Queensbridge Park in Queens, as well as on Roosevelt Island, were turned into ventilation shafts after the conclusion of construction.

Other portions of the tunnel were built using cut-and-cover construction or rock tunneling. Waste material from the 63rd Street Tunnel's construction was deposited at the tip of Roosevelt Island, as well as off the coast of Astoria, Queens. Over 500,000 cubic yards (380,000 m^{3}) of soil had to be extracted.

== Usage ==
The tunnel has two levels. The two tracks on the upper level, connecting the IND Queens Boulevard Line in Queens to the IND Sixth Avenue Line in Manhattan via the IND 63rd Street Line, are used by the F and M trains. There are also track connections to and from the BMT 63rd Street Line, west of the Lexington Avenue–63rd Street station. The tunnel west of 21st Street/Queensbridge was placed into service in 1989, and the final section of the 63rd Street Tunnel, connecting the 21st Street station to the Queens Boulevard Line, officially opened on December 17, 2001.

The two trackways on the lower level were unused when the tunnel construction project was halted in the 1970s. On January 25, 2023, they carried their first revenue passengers, over 50 years since the tunnels were first holed through. Since then, they are used by the Long Island Rail Road to connect Queens and the Grand Central Madison station, which was constructed as part of the East Side Access project. During construction, the lower level of the 63rd Street Tunnel was used to transport equipment. The laying of permanent tracks started in September 2017. Due to low vertical clearances in the lower level, bilevel rail cars, such as the LIRR's C3 fleet, are not able to serve Grand Central Madison.

During the tunnel's construction, an alignment underneath Central and Queensbridge Parks was decided as the only feasible route for the tunnel. Because the 63rd Street Tunnel is at such a deep level, there are several ventilation shafts along its route. In Central Park, near the Central Park Zoo, there are several ventilation grates that are at the same level as the ground, covering about 1,400 square feet (130 m^{2}) of surface area. A ventilation building was deemed to be architecturally unacceptable, hence the inclusion of several grates. On the other hand, gratings at Queensbridge Park were declared to be unfeasible due to the park's small usable area. Therefore, a ventilation building stands in Queensbridge Park, measuring 60 by 90 feet (18 by 27 m). Additional ventilation shafts are located at Second Avenue and 63rd Street in Manhattan, and on the western shore of Roosevelt Island. When the 63rd Street Connector was constructed in the 1990s, additional ventilation structures were built at 29th and 39th Streets in Queens.

Vents

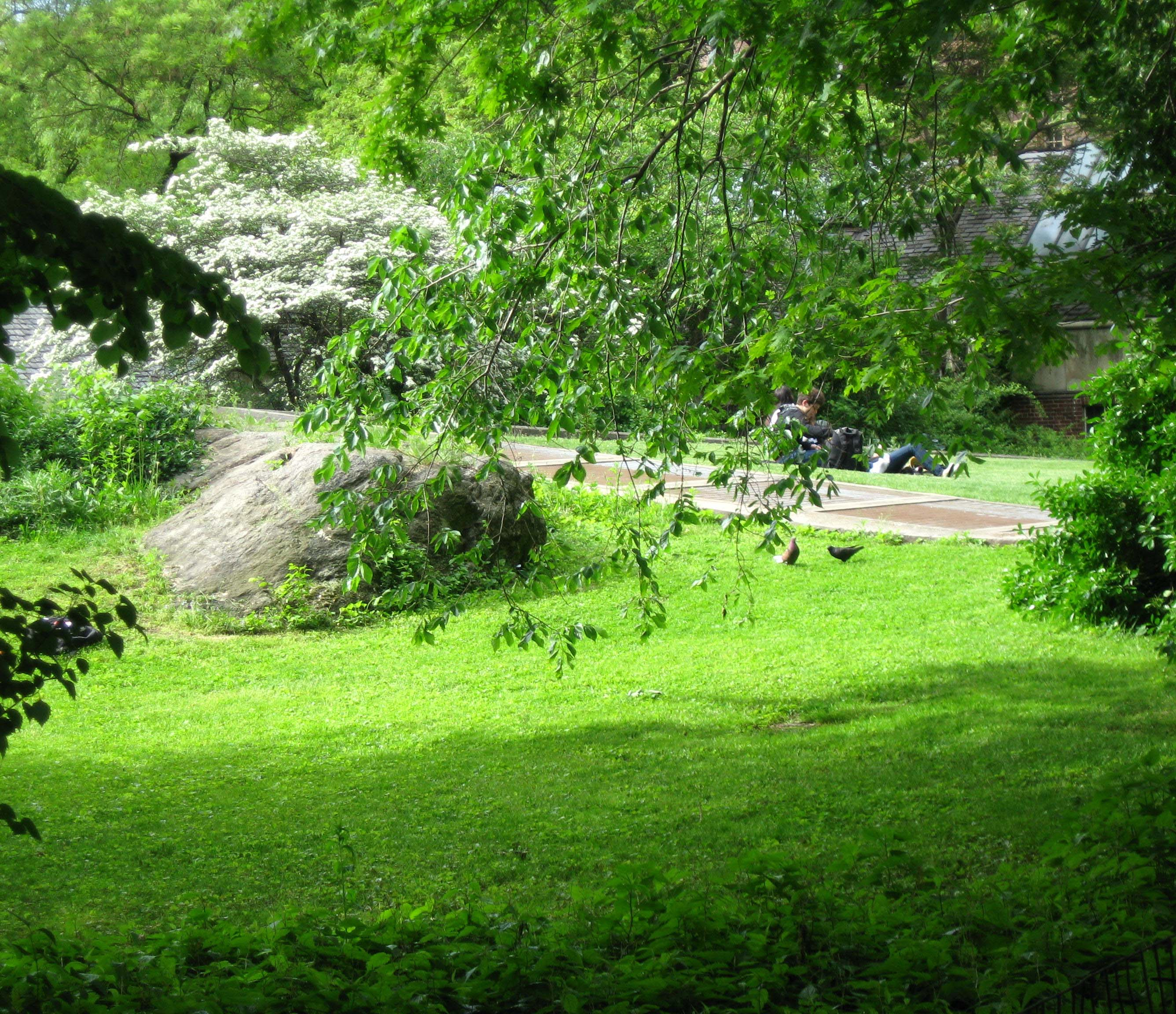
Tunnel vents in Central Park

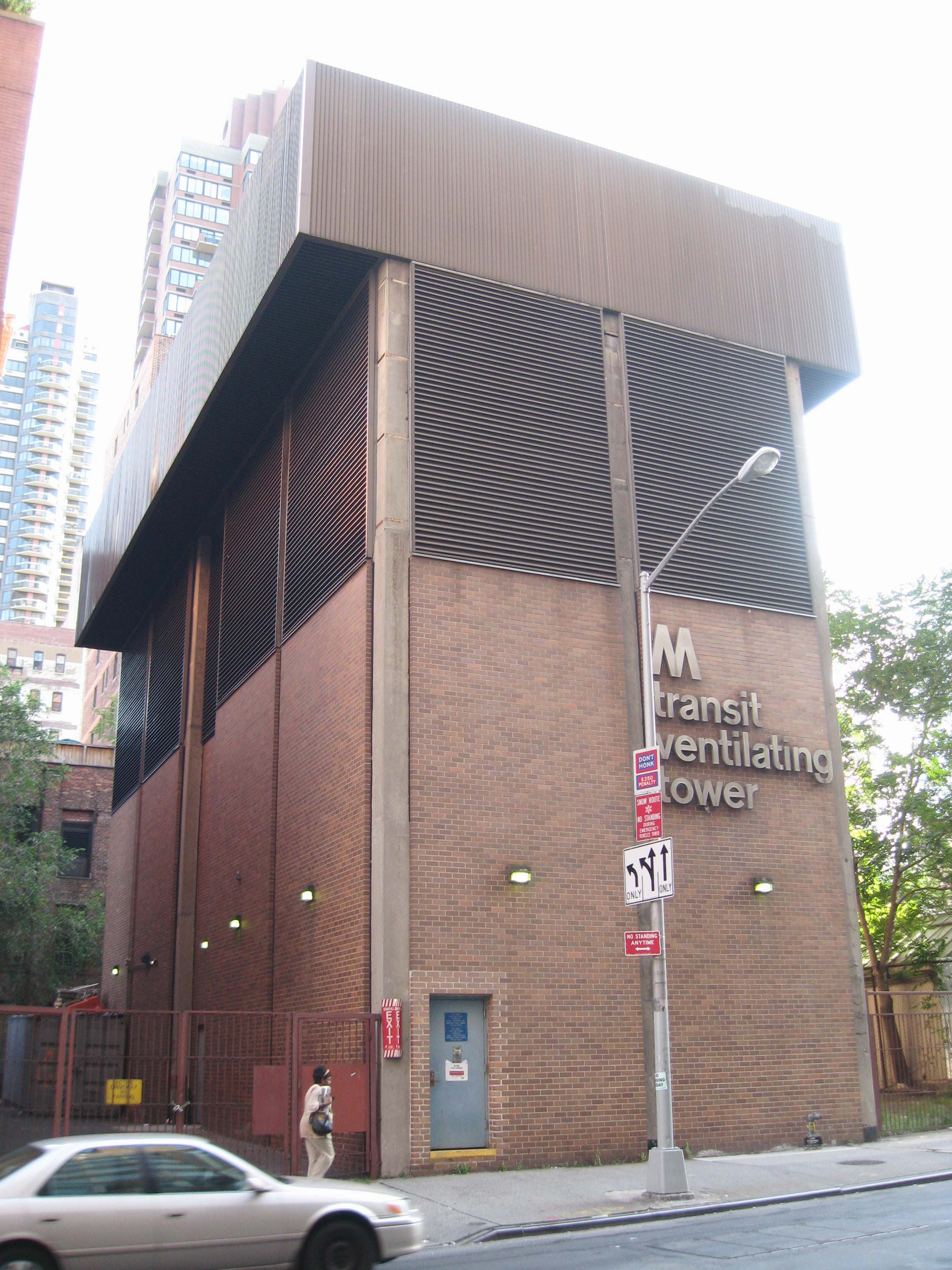
63rd Street ventilator, east of Second Avenue

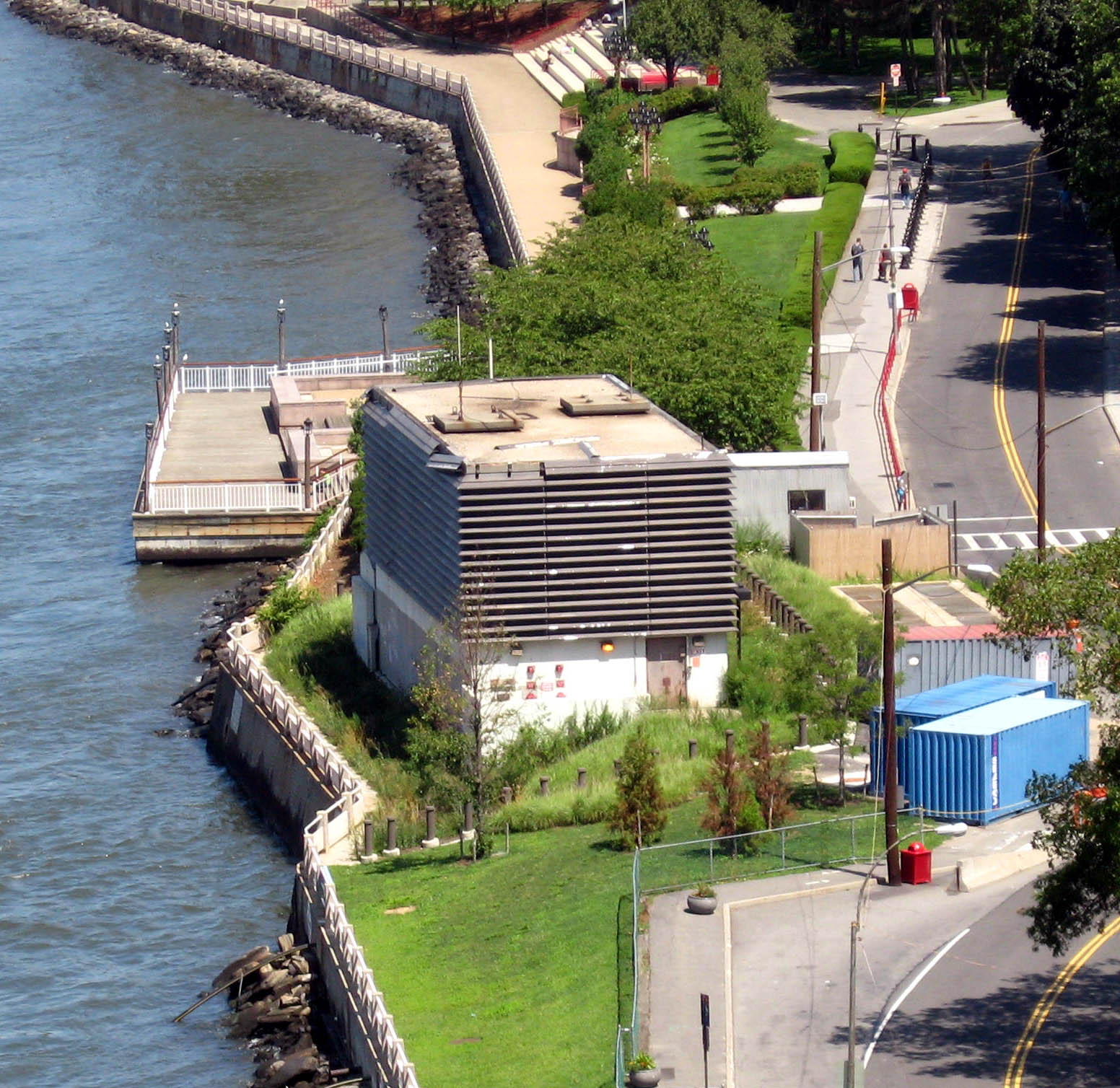
Ventilation structure on Roosevelt Island

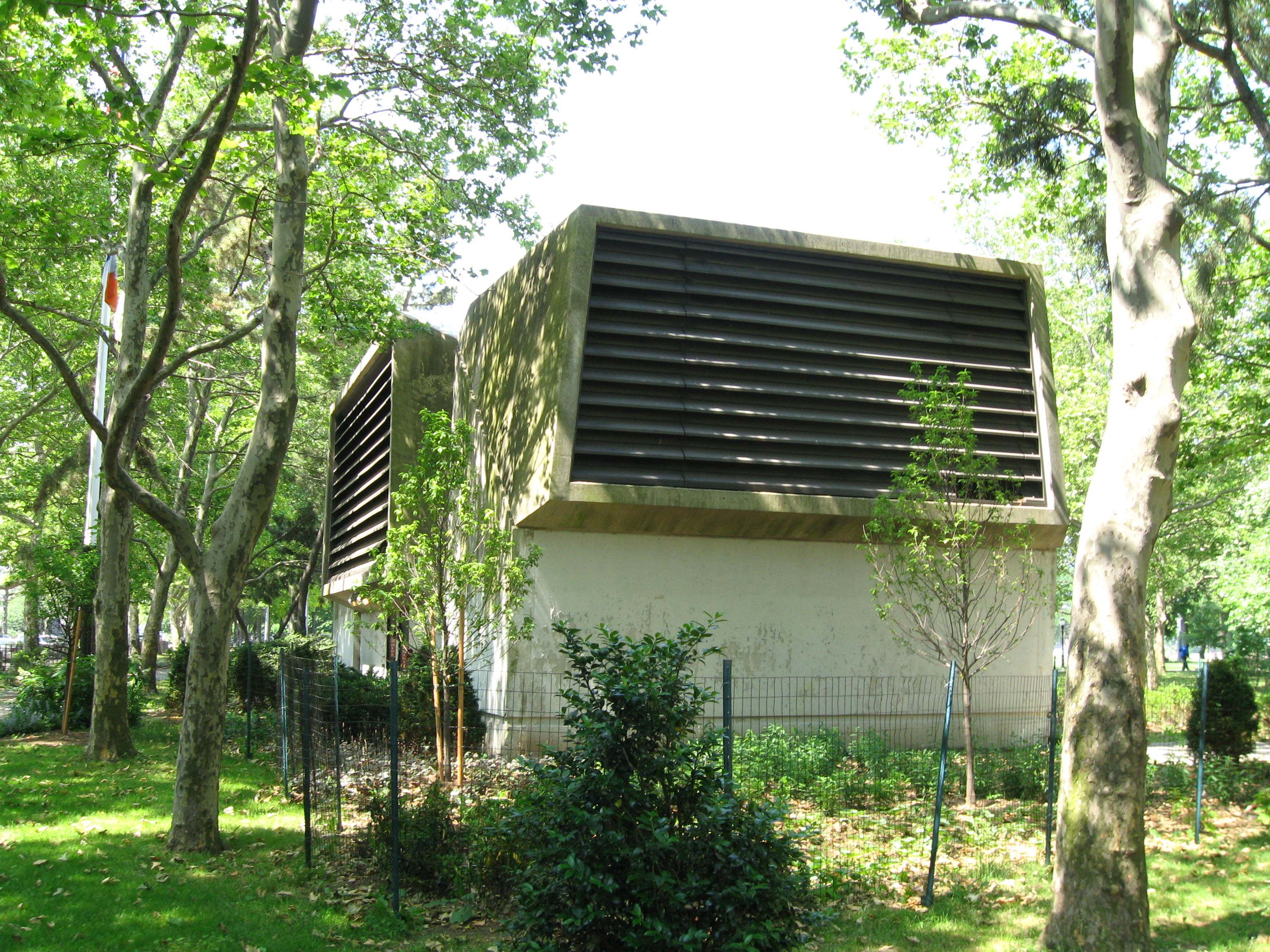
Ventilator and emergency exit in Queensbridge Park

== Awards ==
The 63rd Street Tunnel and the 63rd Street Tunnel Connector received the Construction Achievement Project of the Year Award from the Metropolitan Section of the American Society of Civil Engineers in 1973 and 2000, respectively. The 63rd Street Tunnel Connector was also selected as the Transit Project of the Year in 1999 by New York Construction News.
