= Women Under Siege Project =

Journalism project

- Formation: 2012
- Founder: Gloria Steinem
- Type: Non-governmental organization
- Purpose: humanitarian
- Services: Providing a voice to those who have experienced sexual violence during conflict or war zones; raising awareness about gender-based violence in conflict areas.
- Leader: Lauren Wolfe
- Parent organization: Women's Media Center
- Website: www.womenundersiegeproject.org

The Women Under Siege Project is an independent initiative of the Women's Media Center (WMC). The project documents online and through social media how rape and gender-based violence are used as tools in warfare and genocide. The project uses journalism to investigate and bring to light these issues which impact women throughout the world, but especially in areas of conflict. The director of Women Under Siege, Lauren Wolfe, has said that the first step to challenging rape is to stop victim blaming and to focus on the perpetrators and the cultures that produce them.

The Women Under Siege Project was founded by Gloria Steinem. The director is Lauren Wolfe and the associate editor for Women Under Siege is Shazdeh Omari. The project is organized under the WMC, but operates independently, with contributions from individuals, corporations, and foundations.

== Background ==
Women, and sometimes men, who are in areas of combat are at risk of being used as a tool of warfare. Rape and sexual violence are used in order to humiliate and intimidate individuals, families, and groups of people. Sometimes commanders and leaders of troops consider women to be "a spoil of war".

The issue of stopping rape and sexual violence during wartime is problematic because it has remained "profoundly invisible". Even in countries with support systems to help victims, rape and sexual violence are under-reported. Additionally, many women decide against accusing their attackers because of the legal process, shame, fear, stigma, or worry they will be disbelieved. It is even worse for women in war zones and refugee camps. Many women in areas of conflict are terrified of talking about sexual assault. Because these crimes are unreported or are effectively invisible, they are not addressed.

== History ==
The Women Under Siege Project was started by Gloria Steinem in 2012 in order to document violence against women taking place during violent conflicts. The idea was inspired by two books: Sexual Violence Against Jewish Women During the Holocaust by Sonja M. Hedgepeth and Rochelle Saidel and At the Dark End of the Street: Black Women, Rape and Resistance - a New History of the Civil Rights Movement from Rosa Parks to Black Power by Danielle McGuire. After reading these two books which address sexual violence, Steinem wondered if there were lessons to be learned from both history and current affairs; and also, if information were more widely available and people were aware of the issues, if rape and gender-based violence could be prevented in the future. Steinem has said that "suffering has to be visible and not called inevitable or blamed on the victim before we can stop it."

Steinem decided to start a website to increase awareness about the issue. In creating the website, Steinem hopes to create connections between outbreaks of violence against women and that hopefully society will stand against rape and sexual violence and not see it as "inevitably part of war". She says that "by making clear that gender-based violence is political and public, it admits that sexualized violence can be changed." Rape and gender-based violence being used as tools of conflict and war can't be addressed if the issues are not documented or discussed.

== Website ==
Women Under Siege's website includes blogs about current violent activity and also first-person accounts from those who have experienced violence. Lauren Wolfe has interviewed women from around the world about their experiences. Entries are not always about current events; Jamia Wilson wrote an article for the website about women and sexual violence during civil rights protests. Steinem emphasized that the website can also help women realize that they are not alone and give them a voice.

The original content created for the site was praised for its blunt and honest reporting on the issues by The New York Times.

In 2014, Wolfe reported that many people found her website while conducting "troubling" web searches. Some of the searches included phrases like "how to rape a woman" and "are women to blame for rape?". Wolfe said that these types of searches show how important education is to combating sexual violence.

== Research ==
Women Under Siege conducts detailed research and presents case studies on their website. They are currently attempting to quantify the number of sexual assaults that occurred during the war in Donbas, but numbers are difficult to record because the police in the region "strongly discourage women reporting rapes". Other projects include using data from the International Men and Gender Equality Survey (IMAGES) to address the issue of rape in the Democratic Republic of the Congo (DRC).

== Crowd-sourcing and social media ==
The project has used crowd-sourcing to create maps which show where sexual assault has taken place. In 2012, Women Under Siege put out a call to people from Syria and those working with Syrian refugees to provide information about rape and sexual assault. The entries were created by collecting information from journalists, human rights activists and individual citizens. Some the reports came via email or by Twitter with the hashtag #RapeinSyria. Women Under Siege mapped these incidents, providing over 117 pieces of data for each entry. The data was documented in real time, using a software developed by Ushahidi. The data was analyzed and put together in a comprehensive report that details a huge amount of human suffering. Not only did the information shine a light on the problem, it also uncovered unexpected findings. For example, the data revealed that Syrian government forces were also largely responsible for much of the sexual violence.

== Selected works ==
- WMC Women Under Siege Project: Syria Crowdmap (2012)
- WMC Women Under Siege Project Reports: Sexualized Violence in Conflict Zones

- Burma, 2012
- Democratic Republic of Congo, 2012
- Sri Lanka, 2013
- Bosnia, 2012
- Colombia, 2013
- Nanking, 2014
- Mexico, 2012
- Libya, 2012
- 2012 Darfur-Sudan, 2012
- Sierra-Leone, 2013
- Bangladesh, 2012
- North Korea, 2012
- Egypt, 2012
- Rwanda, 2012
- Liberia, 2013
- Holocaust, 2012
