= Queensbridge Park =

Public park in Queens, New York

- River Park (former)
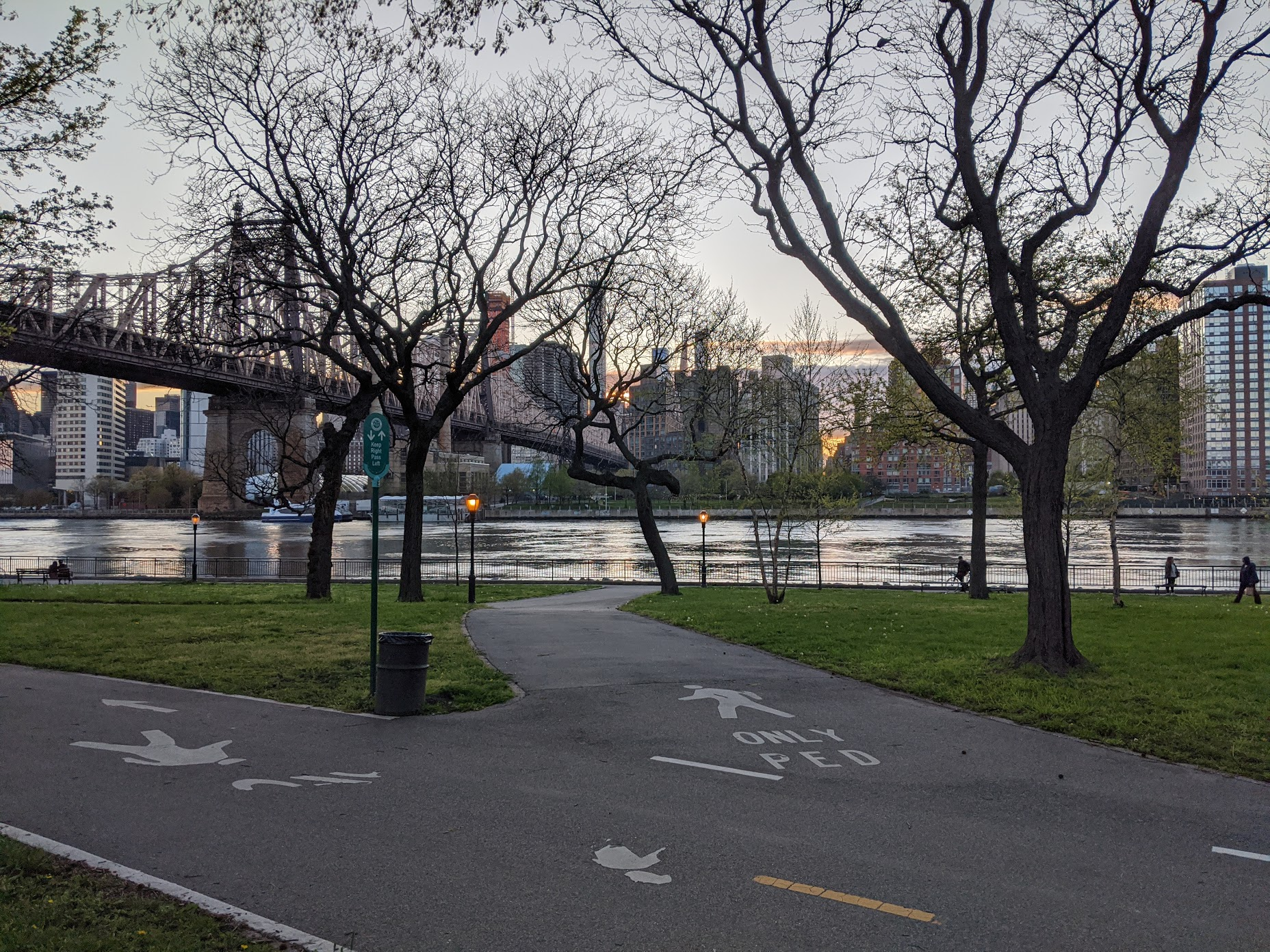
- A jogging path in Queensbridge Park. The Queensboro Bridge is visible at left.

- Location within New York City
- Location: Long Island City, Queens, New York City, United States
- Coordinates: 40°45′23″N 73°56′56″W
- Area: 20.34 acres
- Created: 1939
- Operator: New York City Department of Parks and Recreation

Queensbridge Park, named for the nearby Queensboro Bridge, is a 20.34-acre (8.23 ha) city park along the East River in Long Island City, Queens, New York City. The park is a primary place of recreation for residents of Queensbridge Houses and has a riverfront promenade, baseball diamonds, running paths, lawns and areas for picnicking.

== History ==
The New York City government acquired the land on which Queensbridge Park lies in 1939, the same year the Queensbridge Houses across Vernon Boulevard opened. While New York City Housing Authority had jurisdiction over the land, it was operated by the New York City Department of Parks and Recreation. From the 1950s to the 1970s, the park was known as "River Park", in reference to the East River that runs next to it.

During construction for the 63rd Street Tunnel, which was completed in 1989, a 60-by-90-foot (18 by 27 m) combined ventilation structure and emergency exit was constructed in the park.

In 2014, a large seawall was constructed against the East River to protect against erosion. The project also created a 6 feet (1.8 m) wide promenade which was named for longtime park advocate Elizabeth McQueen.

In 2019, the park was used in the filming of the film Clifford the Big Red Dog.

== Today ==
Queensbridge Park is the venue for numerous summertime live concerts, with music ranging from R&B to Latin. It also serves as the home of the Queensbridge Little League.

== Gallery ==
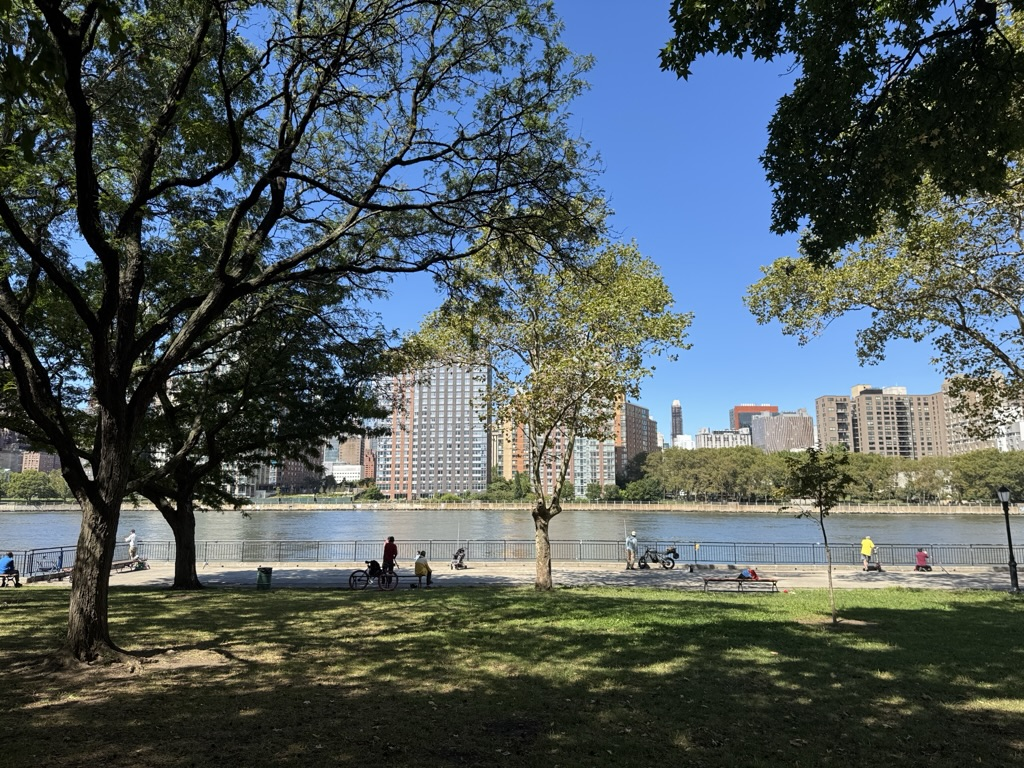
View of East River

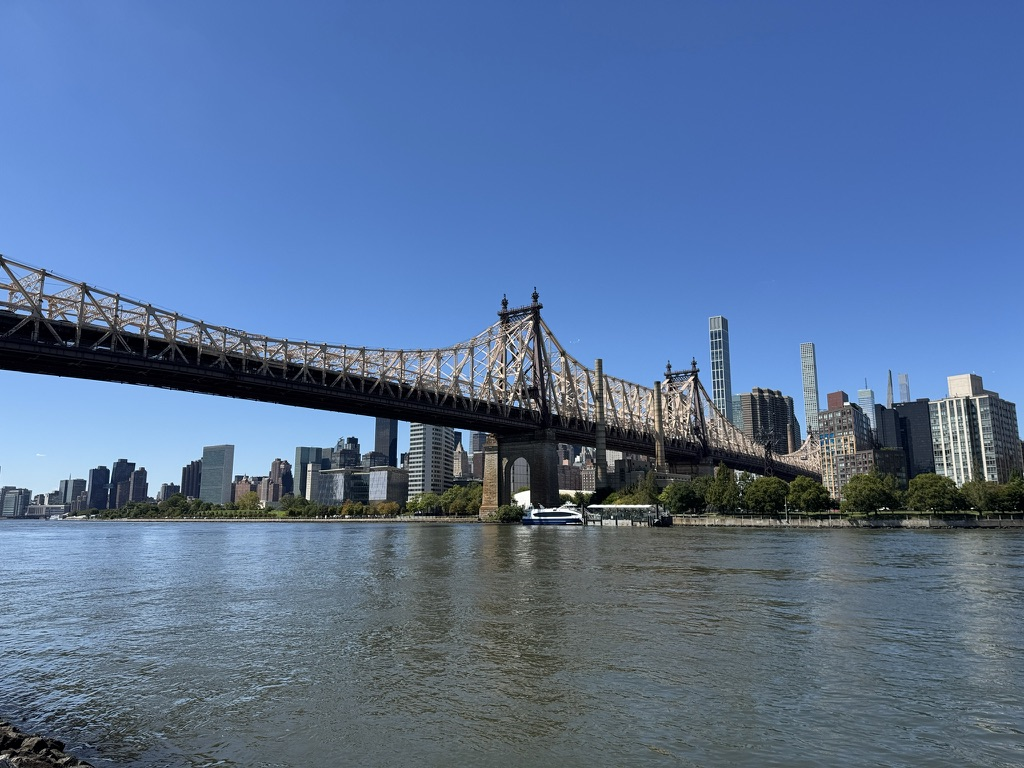
View of Queensboro Bridge

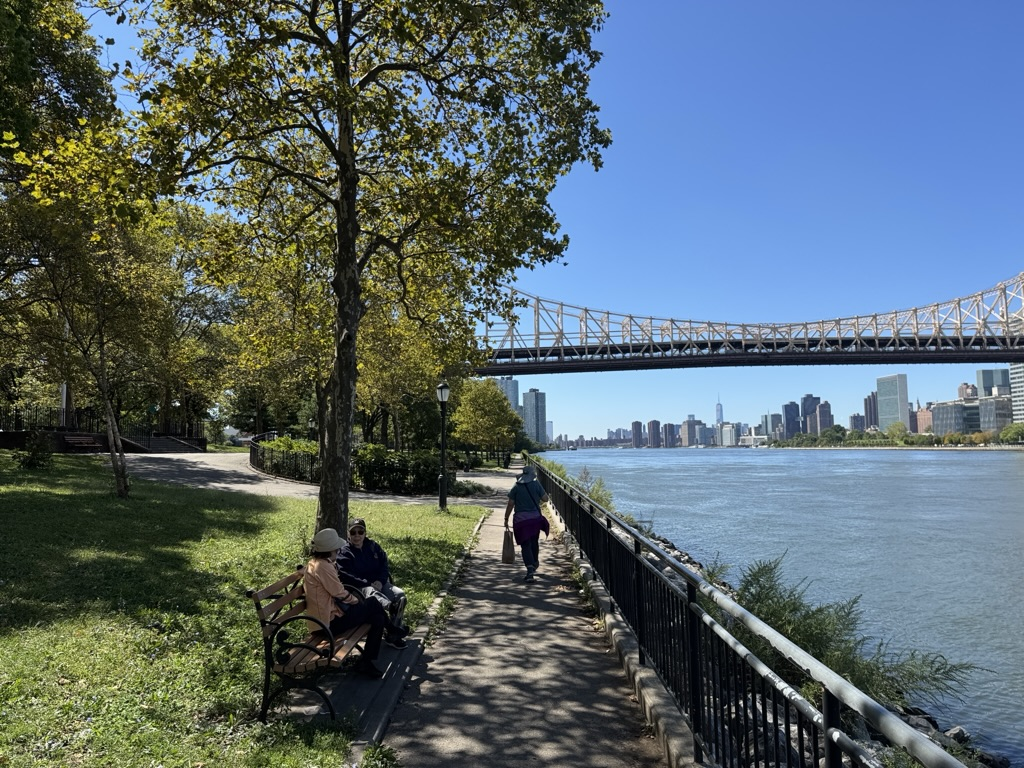
Walk along East River

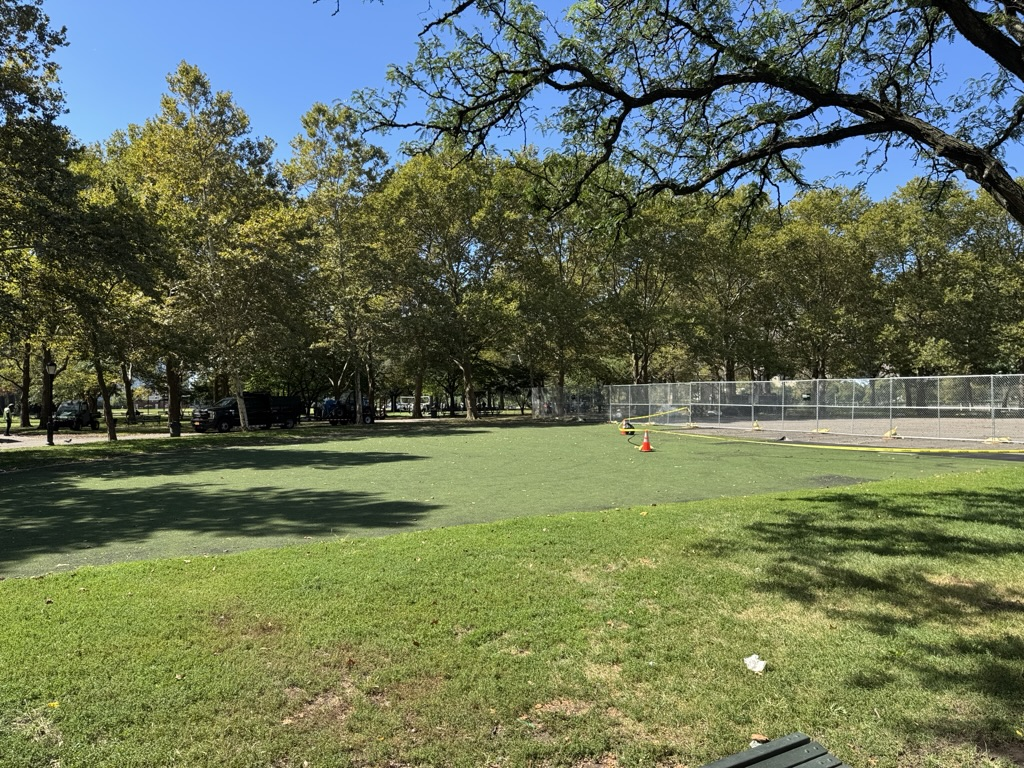
Grass field

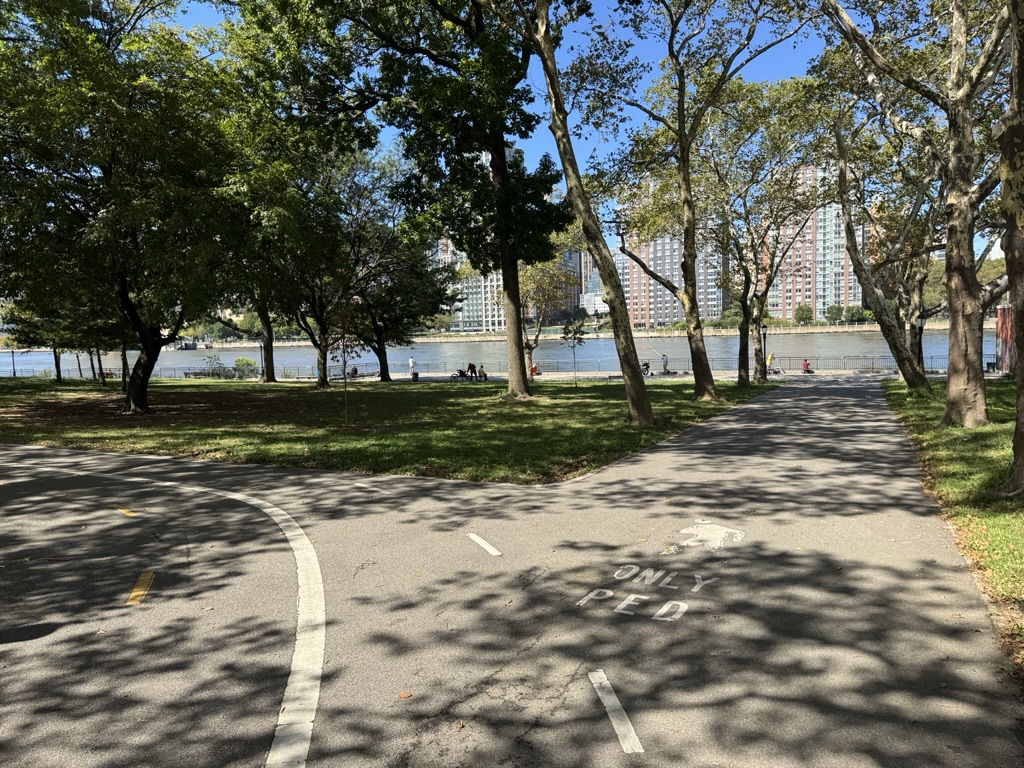
Walking and cycle paths in the park

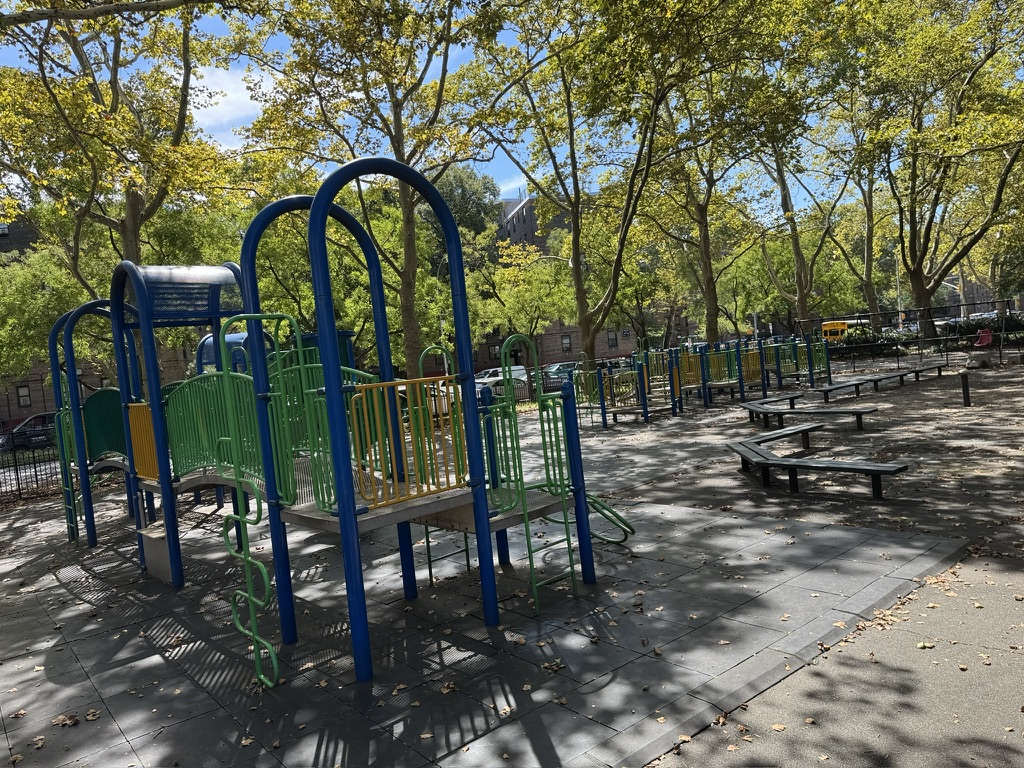
Playground

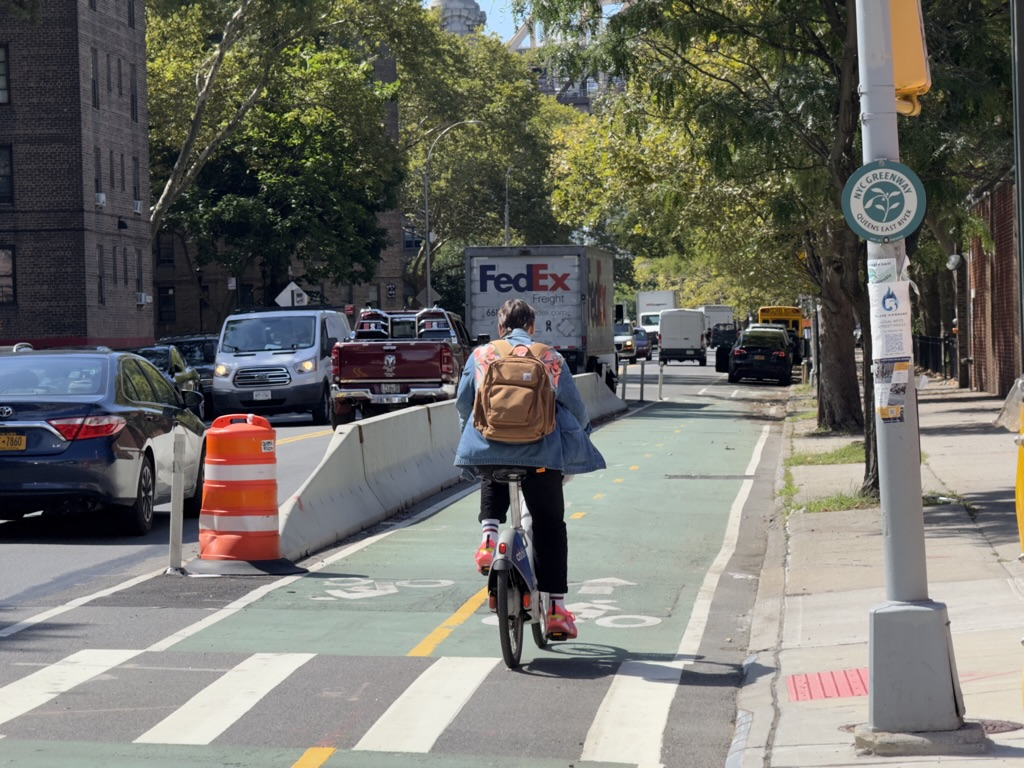
Cycle path outside the park

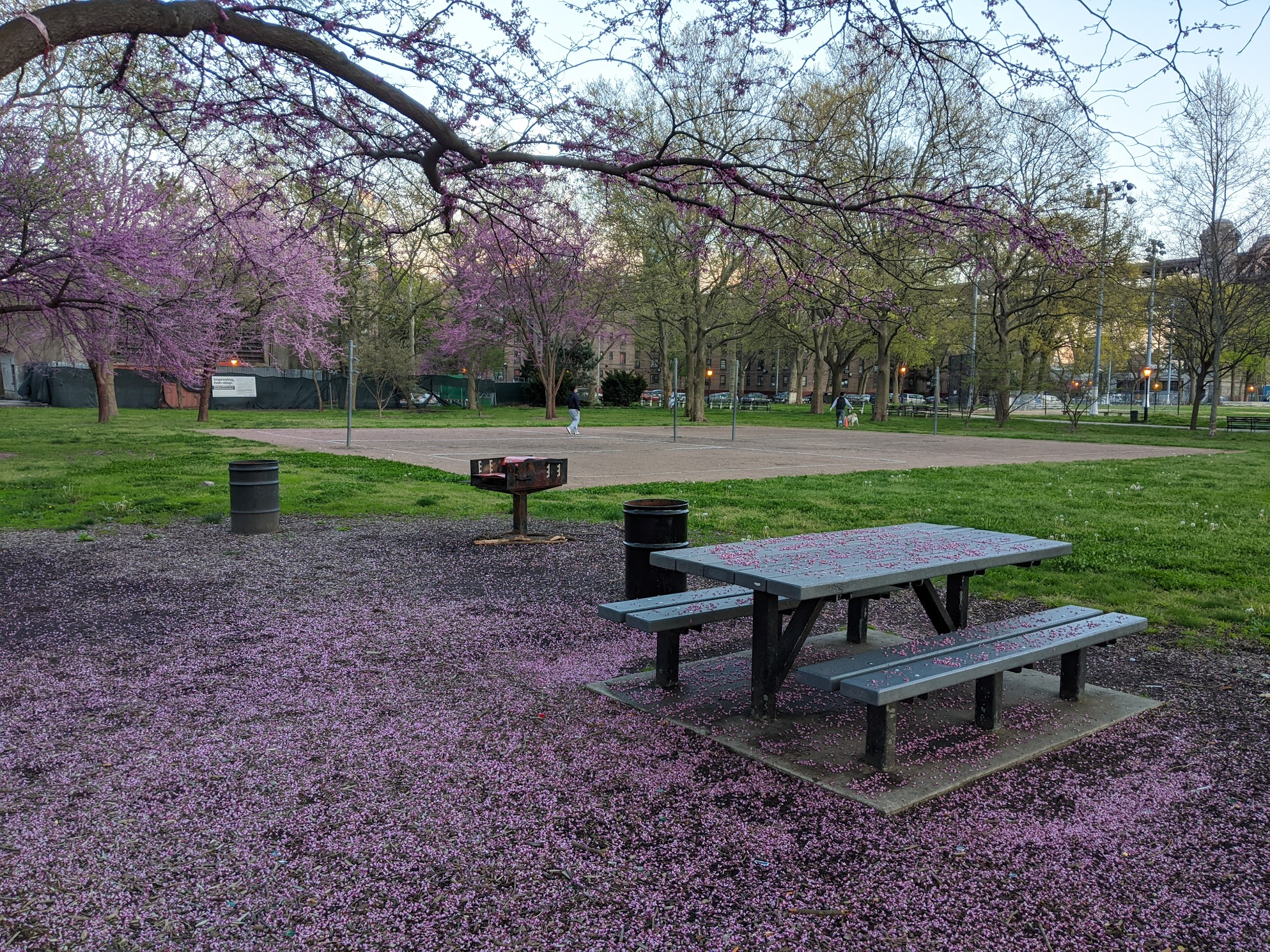
Cercis canadensis in bloom

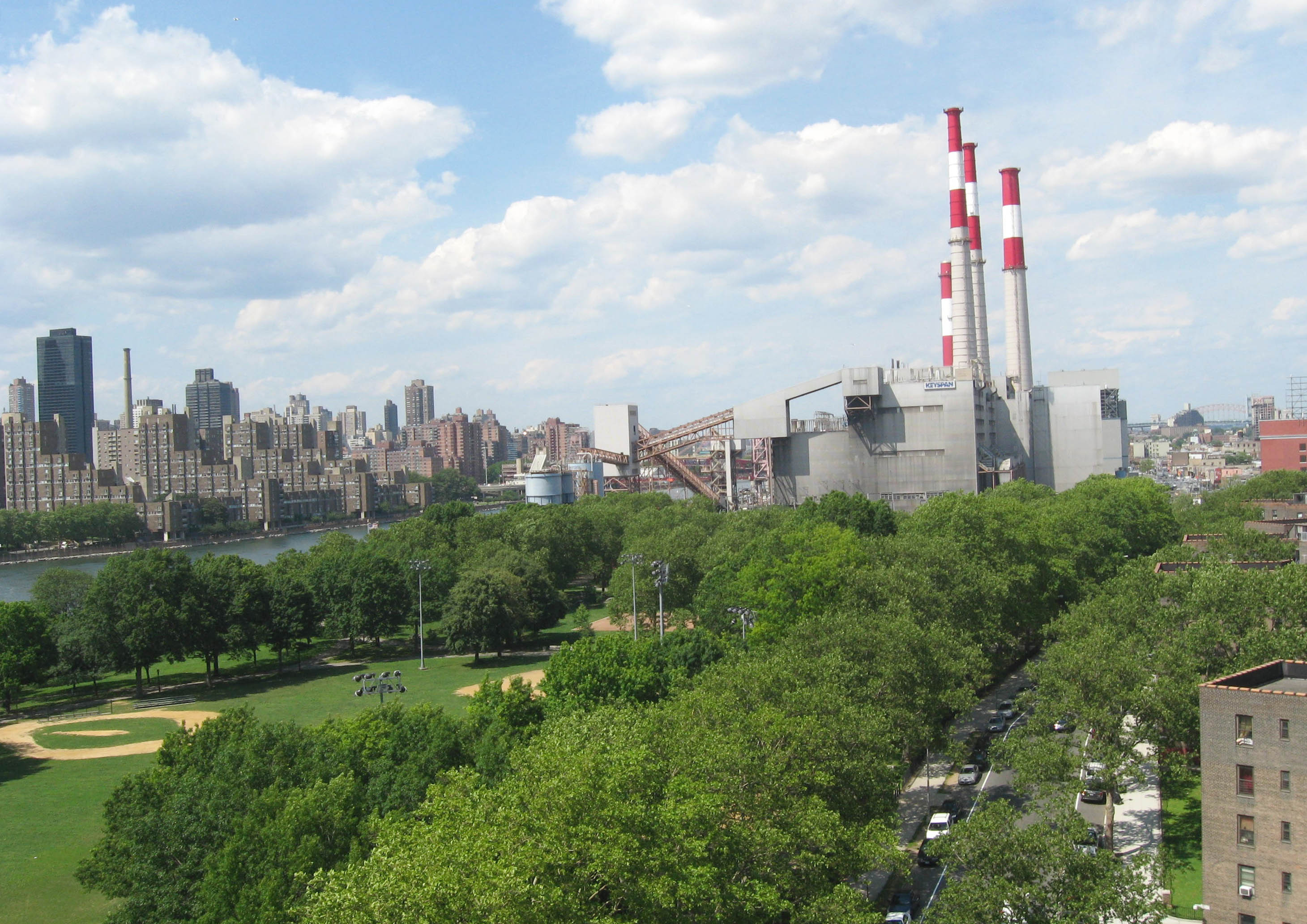
Aerial view with Ravenswood Generating Station
