= Gemma La Guardia Gluck =

American writer

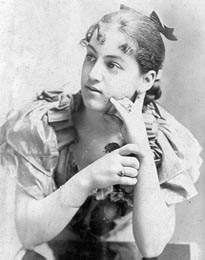
- Gemma La Guardia Gluck (circa 1900)
- Born: Gemma La Guardia; April 24, 1881; New York City
- Died: November 2, 1962 (aged 81); New York City
- Citizenship: American, Hungarian
- Spouse: Herman Gluck
- Children: Yolanda Gluck Denes, Irene Gluck

Gemma La Guardia Gluck (April 24, 1881 – November 2, 1962) was an American writer, of Italian Jewish origin, who lived in Hungary and was a survivor of the Holocaust. Her autobiography, published in 1961, tells of her experience as a survivor of the Ravensbrück concentration camp, but also offers vivid memories of her childhood spent in America with her parents and brother Fiorello La Guardia, the future first Italian-American mayor of New York.

== Biography ==
=== American childhood ===
Gemma La Guardia was born in New York on 24 April 1881. Her father, Achille La Guardia, was an Italian immigrant originally from a Catholic family of Foggia; by profession her father was a musician and in 1885 he became director of the band of the 11th Infantry Regiment. Her mother was Irene Luzzatto Coen, a Jewish-Italian woman originally from Trieste, a niece on the maternal side of Samuel David Luzzatto. Gemma, with her brothers Fiorello and Richard, went with their father to the various places where he was posted: Fort Sully, South Dakota, Watertown, New York, and finally Arizona. She received a solid musical education from her father as a child and inherited from her mother the rich Central European polyglot tradition.

=== Life in Hungary ===
In 1898, her father, seriously ill during the Spanish-American war, left the American army, and the family moved to the maternal home of Trieste, in the then Austro-Hungarian Empire. After the death of her father in 1904, the family moved to Budapest, where Gemma gave English lessons. In 1908, she married a Hungarian Jew, Herman Gluck, and settled there permanently, together with her mother who died and was buried there in 1915. Fiorello and Richard returned to New York, where Fiorello completed his studies and began his political career. Richard died of a heart attack in 1927.

Gemma's life in Budapest between the two wars was not marked by any particular events. Her husband held an important position in a bank in Budapest. They had two daughters: the first-born Yolanda Gluck Denes (born in 1911) married in Hungary, while Irene Gluck (born in 1918) emigrated to the United States. With the outbreak of the Second World War, along with millions of other Jews, the family was overwhelmed by the tragedy of the Holocaust.

=== The Holocaust ===
On 7 June 1944, Gemma La Guardia Gluck, identified as the sister of Fiorello La Guardia, the famous and influential mayor of New York, was arrested by the Nazis along with her husband, daughter, son-in-law and grandson. She was first detained in Mauthausen with her husband and then from 19 June 1944 interned in the Ravensbrück concentration camp, where her daughter and grandchild were also taken without her knowledge. The Nazis spared Gemma from forced labor obligations in the hope of being able to use it for an exchange of prisoners, which never happened.

The two women (and the grandson) survived their captivity; their husbands, however, both died in Mauthausen. After the war, they applied to emigrate to the United States. With the death of her husband Gemma had regained American citizenship, but her daughter and her grandchild as Hungarian citizens found themselves faced with the initial opposition of the American authorities and grueling expectations, first in Berlin and then in Denmark. Fiorello, very close to his sister but faithful to his upright attitude, helped his family in every possible way but insisted that no favoritism was applied to them; in the end, in May 1947, the family was able to meet in New York, a few months before Fiorello's death.

=== After the War ===
Gemma spent the last years of her life in a modest apartment in Queens, living in Queensbridge Houses, a low-income housing project build by the LaGuardia administration in 1939. When she arrived in New York in 1947, she wrote a memoir (My Story) which was published in 1961 by S.L. Shneiderman (the book was republished in 2007 by Rochelle G. Saidel with the title of Fiorello's Sister: Gemma La Guardia Gluck's Story). It is an important testimony to the story of a Hungarian Jewish family who were victims of the Holocaust and the terrible living conditions in the Ravensbrück concentration camp, but also offers vivid memories of the childhood spent in America with her brother Fiorello and their parents. She died in New York, 2 November 1962.

== Works ==
- Gemma La Guardia Gluck. My Story, ed. S. L. Shneiderman (1961)
  - Gemma La Guardia Gluck, Fiorello's Sister: Gemma La Guardia Gluck's Story, ed. Rochelle G. Saidel (Syracuse University Press, 2007)
