= Rochelle Saidel =

Jewish-American writer

Rochelle G. Saidel is an American writer and researcher. She founded the Remember the Women Institute in 1997 and currently serves as its executive director.

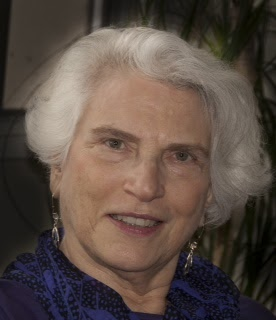
Rochelle Saidel (2020)

== Biography ==
Saidel is originally from Glens Falls, New York. She received her undergraduate education from both Queens College, City University of New York and Barnard College. She then received her M.S. in education from Queens College and her PhD in political science from the Graduate Center of the City University of New York.

=== Writing ===
Saidel is the author of numerous books, with a focus on the Holocaust. Her first book, published in 1985, was The Outraged Conscience: Seekers for Justice of Nazi War Criminals in America. She has since authored or edited seven other books about the Holocaust, mainly discussing the often untold stories of women. She authored Never Too Late To Remember: The Politics Behind New York City's Holocaust Museum, Mielec, Poland: The Shtetl that Became a Nazi Concentration Camp, and The Jewish Women of Ravensbrück Concentration Camp. The Ravensbrück book was named a National Jewish Book Awards finalist and was published in English, Hebrew, and Portuguese. Saidel is also the editor of several books, including an expanded version of the memoir of Gemma La Guardia Gluck, the sister of New York City Mayor Fiorello La Guardia, entitled Fiorello's Sister: Gemma La Guardia Gluck's Story. In addition, Saidel co-edited with Sonja Hedgepeth the anthology Sexual Violence against Jewish Women during the Holocaust. She co-edited four editions of Women, Theater, and the Holocaust Resource Handbook with Karen Shulman; VIOLATED! Women in Holocaust and Genocide with Batya Brutin; and Teaching and Education with Gender Equality in Childhood and Adolescence: A Practical Guide for Teachers (in Portuguese). Saidel has also been a correspondent for the Jewish Telegraphic Agency. She has written numerous articles for the Jerusalem Post, the Times of Israel, Hadassah Magazine, Lilith, and other periodicals. Most of Saidel's works focus on the experiences of Jewish women during the Holocaust.

=== Exhibitions ===
Saidel has been the curator or coordinator for several important art and history exhibitions. She coordinated Bitter Hope: From Holocaust to Haven, a permanent exhibition about the Oswego, New York refugee camp for the New York State Museum in Albany. In 2001, she was guest curator for the Florida Holocaust Museum's Women of Ravensbrück: portraits of courage, art by Julia Terwilliger exhibition, which later travelled extensively. She also curated an exhibition about Gemma La Guardia Gluck for Hebrew Union College-Jewish Institute of Religion at their New York City campus. She coordinated the 2018 exhibition: VIOLATED! Women in Holocaust and Genocide, Remember the Women Institute's international group exhibition at the Ronald Feldman Gallery in New York City. VIOLATED! Women in Holocaust and Genocide with Batya Brutin;

=== Film and television ===
Saidel has worked on several films and television programs, most of them related to the Holocaust. She was a consultant and made a cameo appearance for Rosemarie Reed's Where Birds Never Sang: The Ravensbrück and Sachsenhausen Concentration Camps (also known as Where Birds Don't Sing: The Ravensbrück and Sachsenhausen Concentration Camps). She was also a consultant for Ronnie Sarnat's Screaming Silence, a documentary about children who were sexually abused during the Holocaust, and for Return to a Burning House, a film about Holocaust heroine Haviva Reik. Saidel also appeared in Triangles: Witnesses of the Holocaust, a film about LGBTQ Holocaust Survivors, and Living with Shadows, about sexual violence in the Holocaust. She produced and hosted a three-part television program called From Hitler to Uncle Sam: How American Intelligence Used Nazi War Criminals. This show was based on a book written by Charles R. Allen Jr., who Saidel worked with on other books about Nazis. She also created, produced, and hosted a twice-monthly documentary telecast on subjects including the Holocaust: Heritage and Destiny on the Albany ABC Affiliate, on behalf of the Greater Albany Jewish Federation and Anti-Defamation League.

=== Advocacy ===
In 1997, Saidel founded the Remember the Women Institute, based in New York City. Under Saidel's leadership, the institute has organized and participated in numerous conferences related to women in the Holocaust. Her focus on sexual violence during the Holocaust has evolved to include domestic, or intimate partner, violence. Saidel, along with Sonja Hedgepeth, has worked with Gloria Steinem and other feminist activists on issues relating to sexual assault against women during genocides. In 2011, Saidel and Hedgepeth participated in a panel centered around their book, Sexual Violence against Jewish Women during the Holocaust. Steinem led this panel. The Women Under Siege Project, an initiative of the Women's Media Center founded by Steinem and others, was inspired by Hedgepeth and Saidel's book. In the 1980s, Saidel was the Special Assistant to New York State Senate Minority Leader Manfred Ohrenstein. She advised him on issues relating to Holocaust remembrance and the creation of the New York City Holocaust Museum. Beginning in 1977, she was at the forefront of early efforts to deport Nazi war criminals from the United States. She co-authored an informational booklet entitled Nazi War Criminals in America: Facts...Action with Charles R. Allen, Jr.

== Honors ==
- National Endowment for the Humanities Summer Seminar Visiting Scholar
- Member (first woman), National Commission for Catholic-Jewish Religious Dialogue in Brazil
- 21 Leaders of 21st century from Women’s eNews
- Associate Visiting Scholar at the Center for the Study of Women and Society, The Graduate School and University Center of the City University of New York
- Senior Researcher, NEMGE Center for the Study of Women and the Social Relations of Gender, University of São Paulo
- National Jewish Book Awards Finalist for The Jewish Women of Ravensbrück Concentration Camp

== Bibliography ==
=== Written ===
- The Outraged Conscience: Seekers of Justice for Nazi War Criminals in America: (1985)
- Never Too Late To Remember: The Politics Behind New York City's Holocaust Museum (1996)
- The Jewish Women of Ravensbrück Concentration Camp (2004)
- Mielec, Poland: The Shtetl That Became a Nazi Concentration Camp (2012)

=== Edited ===
- Teaching and Education with Gender Equality in Childhood and Adolescence: A Practical Guide for Teachers (Portuguese) (1996)
- Fiorello's Sister: Gemma La Guardia Gluck's Story (2007)
- Sexual Violence Against Jewish Women during the Holocaust (2010)
- Women, Theater, and the Holocaust Resource Handbook (2015)
- VIOLATED! Women in Holocaust and Genocide (2018)

== See also ==
- Museum of Jewish Heritage
- List of Jewish American authors
- Ravensbrück Concentration Camp
- Jewish Women in the Holocaust
