= Pete Rock production discography =

The following list is a discography of production credited to Pete Rock, an American hip-hop record producer and recording artist from Mount Vernon, New York. It includes a list of songs produced, co-produced and remixed by year, artist, album and title.

== 1989 ==
=== Heavy D & the Boyz - Big Tyme ===
- 04. "Mood for Love" (co-produced by Eddie F and Heavy D)
- 06. "A Better Land" (co-produced by Heavy D)
- 09. "Big Tyme" (co-produced by Eddie F)
- 12. "Let It Flow" (co-produced by Eddie F and Heavy D)

== 1990 ==
=== Johnny Gill - Rub You the Right Way 12" ===
- B1. "Rub You the Right Way [Extended Hype]" (feat. C.L. Smooth)

=== Groove B Chill - Starting From Zero ===
- 01. "Starting From Zero"
- 02. "There It Is"

== 1991 ==
=== Brand Nubian - Slow Down 12" ===
- A3. "Slow Down (Pete Rock's Newromix)"

=== EPMD - Rampage 12" ===
- A2. "Rampage (Hardcore to the Head Mix)"
- A3. "Rampage (Remix Radio Edit)"

=== Father MC - Lisa Baby 12" ===
- A2. "Lisa Baby (Hip Hop Fat Pete Rock Remix)"

=== Heavy D & the Boyz - Is It Good to You 12" ===
- A2. "Is It Good to You (Straight Mix)" [feat. Pete Rock & Tammy Lucas] (co-produced by Teddy Riley)

=== Heavy D & the Boyz - Peaceful Journey ===
- 02. "Let It Rain"
- 05. "Don't Curse" (featuring Big Daddy Kane, Grand Puba, Kool G Rap, Q-Tip, Pete Rock & CL Smooth)
- 08. "Cuz He'z Alwayz Around"
- 10. "Letter to the Future"
- 13. "Do Me, Do Me"

=== Public Enemy - Shut 'Em Down 12" ===
- A1. "Shut Em Down (Pe-te Rock Mixx)" [feat. Pete Rock]

=== Kid 'n Play - Face the Nation ===
- 04. "Next Question"
- 10. "Bill's at the Door"

=== Main Source - Breaking Atoms ===
- 11. "Vamos a Rapiar" (co-produced by Large Professor)

=== Pete Rock & CL Smooth - All Souled Out ===
- 01. "Good Life"
- 02. "Mecca & The Soul Brother"
- 03. "Go with the Flow"
- 04. "The Creator"
- 05. "All Souled Out"
- 06. "Good Life" (Group Home Mix)"

== 1992 ==
=== Das EFX - Jussumen 12" ===
- A3. "Jussumen (Remix)"

=== Public Enemy - Nighttrain 12" ===
- A1. "Nighttrain (Get Up Get Involved Throwdown Mixx)"
- B2. "Nighttrain (Pete Rock Strong Island Mt. Vernon Meltdown)"

=== A.D.O.R. - Let It All Hang Out 12" ===
- A1. "Let It All Hang Out"

=== Doug E. Fresh - Doin' What I Gotta Do ===
- 15. "No"

=== Heavy D & the Boyz - Blue Funk ===
- 05. "It's a New Day"
- 07. "Love Sexy"
- 11. "Blue Funk"

=== Shabba Ranks - Just Reality 12" ===
- 06. "Just Reality (Remix)" [featuring C.L. Smooth]

=== House of Pain - House of Pain ===
- 18. "Jump Around (Pete Rock Remix)"

=== Pete Rock & CL Smooth - Mecca and the Soul Brother ===
- 01. "Return of the Mecca"
- 02. "For Pete's Sake"
- 03. "Ghettos of the Mind"
- 04. "Lots of Lovin" (co-produced by Nevelle Hodge)
- 05. "Act Like You Know" (co-produced by Large Professor)
- 06. "Straighten It Out"
- 07. "Soul Brother #1"
- 08. "Wig Out"
- 09. "Anger in the Nation"
- 10. "They Reminisce Over You (T.R.O.Y.)"
- 11. "On and On"
- 12. "It's Like That"
- 13. "Can't Front on Me"
- 14. "The Basement" (featuring Grap Luva, Heavy D, Rob-O, Deda)
- 15. "If It Ain't Rough, It Ain't Right"
- 16. "Skinz" (featuring Grand Puba)

=== Da Youngsta'z - Pass da Mic 12" ===
- B1. "Pass da Mic (Remix)"

=== K-Solo - Time's Up ===
- 02. "Letterman"
- 00. "Letterman (Remix)"

=== Redman - Whut? Thee Album ===
- 18. "How to Roll a Blunt" (co-produced by Redman)

== 1993 ==
=== Da Youngsta's - The Aftermath ===
- 03. "Iz U Wit Me"
- 07. "Who's the Mic Wrecka" (feat. Pete Rock & CL Smooth)

=== DJ Jazzy Jeff & The Fresh Prince - Code Red ===
- 01. "Somethin' Like Dis"
- 06. "Code Red"

=== Father MC - Sex Is Law ===
- 02. "R&B Swinger"

=== Me-2-U - All Night 12" ===
- B1. "Want U Back (Pete Rock's Mix Long Version)"

=== Naughty By Nature - It's On 12" ===
- B2. "Hip Hop Hooray (Pete Rock Remix)"

=== Alexander O'Neal - In the Middle 12" ===
- A1. "In the Middle (No Rap Mix)"
- A2. "In the Middle (Brown Mix)" [feat. C.L. Smooth]
- B1. "In the Middle (Brown Surround Mix)"

=== P.M. Dawn - Looking Through Patient Eyes 12" ===
- A1. "Looking Through Patient Eyes (Pete Rock Mix 2)"

=== Rough House Survivers - Rough House 12" ===
- B1. "Rough House (Pete Rock Remix)"

=== Run-D.M.C. - Down with the King ===
- 01. "Down with the King" (featuring Pete Rock & C.L. Smooth)
- 10. "In the House"
- 14. "Wreck Shop"

=== Pete Rock & CL Smooth - Lots of Lovin 12" ===
- B1. "It's Not a Game"

=== Various artists - Menace II Society (soundtrack) ===
- 10. "Death Becomes You" - Pete Rock & C.L. Smooth & YG'z

=== Various artists - Poetic Justice (soundtrack) ===
- 03. "One in a Million" - Pete Rock & C.L. Smooth

=== Various artists - Who's the Man? (soundtrack) ===
- 03. "What's Next on the Menu?" - Pete Rock & C.L. Smooth

=== YG'z - Street Nigga ===
- 01. "Street Nigga"
- 02. "Ghetto Celeb"
- 03. "Sumthin' 4 da Head"
- 06. "Street Nigga (Pete Rock Remix)"
- 00. "Groove On (Remix)"

== 1994 ==
=== Champ MC - Keep It On the Real 12" ===
- B1. "Keep It On the Real (Pete Rock Remix)"

=== Heavy D & the Boyz - Nuttin' but Love ===
- 02. "Sex with You" (co-produced by Heavy D)
- 03. "Got Me Waiting" (co-produced by Heavy D)
- 11. "Black Coffee" (co-produced by Easy Mo Bee)

=== Jeru The Damaja - You Can't Stop the Prophet 12" ===
- B1. "You Can't Stop the Prophet (Pete Rock Remix)"

=== Lords of the Underground - Flow On (New Symphony) 12" ===
- A1. "Flow On (New Symphony) [Pete Rock Remix]"

=== Nas - Illmatic ===
- 04. "The World Is Yours"

=== The Notorious B.I.G. - Juicy 12" ===
- A3. "Juicy (Remix)"

=== Pete Rock & CL Smooth - The Main Ingredient ===
- 01. "In the House"
- 02. "Carmel City"
- 03. "I Get Physical"
- 04. "Sun Won't Come Out"
- 05. "I Got a Love"
- 06. "Escape"
- 07. "The Main Ingredient"
- 08. "Worldwide"
- 09. "All the Places"
- 10. "Tell Me"
- 11. "Take You There"
- 12. "Searching"
- 13. "Check It Out"
- 14. "In the Flesh"
- 15. "It's on You"
- 16. "Get on the Mic"
- 00. "I Got a Love (Remix)"
- 00. "Take You There (Remix)"
- 00. "Get on the Mic (Remix)"
- 00. "We Specialize"

=== Shazzy - Pass Anotha Bag 12" ===
- A1. "Pass Anotha Bag"

=== Slick Rick - Behind Bars ===
- 07. "I'm Captive"
- 08. "Get a Job"

== 1995 ==
=== AZ - Doe or Die ===
- 03. "Gimme Yours"
- 05. "Rather Unique"

=== Das EFX - Hold It Down ===
- 20. "Real Hip-Hop [Pete Rock Remix]"

=== Deda - The Original Baby Pa ===
(Due to distribution issues, this LP was shelved until it appeared on the Lost & Found: Hip Hop Underground Soul Classics in 2003.)

- 01. "Everyman"
- 02. "Baby Pa"
- 03. "How I'm Livin'"
- 04. "Blah Uno"
- 05. "Can't Wait"
- 06. "I Originate"
- 07. "Markd4Death"
- 08. "Nasty Scene"
- 09. "Nothing More"
- 10. "Press Rewind"
- 11. "Rhyme Writer"
- 12. "Too Close"
- 13. "Understand?"

=== INI - Center of Attention ===
(Due to distribution issues, this LP was shelved until it appeared on the Lost & Found: Hip Hop Underground Soul Classics in 2003.)

- 01. "Intro"
- 02. "No More Words"
- 04. "Think Twice" (featuring Pete Rock)
- 05. "Square One"
- 06. "The Life I Live"
- 07. "Kross Roads" (featuring Pete Rock)
- 08. "To Each His Own" (featuring Large Professor & Q-Tip)
- 09. "Fakin Jax'"
- 10. "What You Say"
- 11. "Props"
- 12. "Center of Attention"
- 13. "Grown Man Sport" (featuring Meccalicious)
- 14. "Mind Over Matter"
- 00. "Keep On"
- 00. "Fakin' Jax (Rude Youth Mix)" (featuring Pete Rock & Meccalicious)

=== Jamal - Fades Em All 12" ===
- A1. "Fades Em All (Pete Rock Remix)"

=== Monica - Before You Walk Out of My Life 12" ===
- A1. "Before You Walk Out of My Life (Pete Rock Remix)"

=== Scha Dara Parr - The Cycle Hits-Remix Best Collection ===
- 01. "彼方からの手紙 [Remixed by PETE ROCK]"

== 1996 ==
=== Akhenaton - La Face B 12" ===
- A1. "La Face B (Pete Rock Remix)"

=== Akiko - Back Home 12" ===
- A1. "Back Home (Soul Brother's Midnight Mix)"
- A3. "Back Home (Soul Brother's All Night Long Mix)"

=== Common - Relativity Urban Assault ===
- A1. "The Bitch in Yoo"

=== Incognito - Remixed ===
- 07. "Roots (Pete Rock Remix)"

=== Jimmy Cliff - Crime 7" ===
- B1. "Crime (Pete Rock Hip Hop Remix)"

=== Lost Boyz - Legal Drug Money / America Is Dying Slowly ===
- 02. "The Yearn" (feat. Pete Rock)

=== Sadat X - Wild Cowboys ===
- 14. "Escape from New York"

=== Various Artists - The Fan (soundtrack) ===
- 03. "Unstoppable" - Mic Geronimo {later released on Vendetta}

=== Various artists - High School High (soundtrack) ===
- 07. "The Rap World" - Pete Rock and Large Professor (co-produced by Large Professor)

== 1997 ==
=== Various artists - Dangerous Ground (soundtrack) ===
- 04. "Keep On Pushin'" - MC Lyte, Bahamadia, Nonchalant and Yo-Yo

=== The Psycho Realm - The Stone Garden 12" ===
- B1. "The Stone Garden (Pete Rock Remix)"

=== Rakim - The 18th Letter ===
- 06. "The Saga Begins"
- 14. "When I'm Flowin'"

== 1998 ==
=== A.D.O.R. - Shock Frequency ===
- 01. "The Penetration (interlude)"
- 10. "Enter the Center"

=== All City - Metropolis Gold ===
- 03. "Priceless"

=== De La Soul - Stay Away 12" ===
- A1. "Stay Away (Main Mix)"

=== O.C. - Bonus Jewelz ===
- 04. T"he Chosen One (PR Remix)"

=== Jesse Powell - 'Bout It ===
- 10. "I Wasn't With It (Remix)" [featuring Sauce Money]

=== Funkmaster Flex - The Mix Tape, Vol. III ===
- "Prime Time" (featuring Xzibit, Phil Da Agony and Tha Alkaholiks)

=== Gang Starr - The ? Remainz EP ===
- 02. "The Militia Soul Brother Remix" (featuring Big Shug & Freddie Foxxx)

=== Pete Rock - Soul Survivor ===
- 01. "Soul Survivor Intro"
- 02. "Tru Master" (feat. Inspectah Deck and Kurupt)
- 03. "Half Man Half Amazin" (feat. Method Man) (co-produced by Grap Luva)
- 04. "Respect Mine" (feat. O.C.)
- 05. "Tha Game" (feat. Raekwon, Prodigy and Ghostface Killah)
- 06. "#1 Soul Brother"
- 07. "Rock Steady Part II" (feat. Lord Tariq and Peter Gunz)
- 08. "Truly Yours 98" (feat. Large Professor and Kool G Rap)
- 09. "It's About That Time" (feat. Black Thought and Rob-O)
- 10. "One Life to Live" (feat. MC Eiht)
- 11. "Take Your Time" (feat. Loose Ends)
- 12. "Mind Blowin'" (feat. Vinia Mojica)
- 13. "Soul Survivor" (feat. Miss Jones)
- 14. "Da Two" (feat. CL Smooth)
- 15. "Verbal Murder 2" (feat. Big Pun, N.O.R.E. and Common)
- 16. "Strange Fruit" (feat. Tragedy Khadafi, Cappadonna, and Sticky Fingaz)
- 17. "Massive (Hold Tight)" [feat. Heavy D and Beenie Man]

== 1999 ==
=== Black Star - Respiration 12" ===
- B1. "Respiration (Flying High Radio Mix)" [featuring Black Thought]

=== Inspectah Deck - Uncontrolled Substance ===
- 12. "Trouble Man" (featuring Vinia Mojica)

=== Jimmy Cliff - Humanitarian ===
- 04 "Come to My Love"

=== Raekwon - Immobilarity ===
- 16. "Sneakers"

=== Rahzel - Make the Music 2000 ===
- 04. "All I Know"

=== Scritti Politti - Tinseltown to the Boogiedown 12" ===
- B1. "Tinseltown to the Boogiedown (Pete Rock Variation)"

== 2000 ==
=== Big L - The Big Picture ===
- 06. "Holdin' It Down" (featuring A.G., Miss Jones & Stan Spit)
- 13. "Who You Slidin' Wit" (featuring Stan Spit)

=== DJ Muro - Pan Rhythm: Flight No. 11154 ===
- 10. "Patch Up the Pieces" (featuring Freddie Foxxx)

=== Freddie Foxxx - Industry Shakedown ===
- 06. "Who Knows Why?"
- 09. "Industry Shakedown"
- 13. "Bumpy Knuckles Baby"

=== KRS-One - Get Yourself Up 12" ===
- A1. "Get Your Self Up (Pete Rock Remix)"

=== Phife Dawg - Ventilation: Da LP ===
- 07. "Lemme Find Out" (featuring Pete Rock)
- 12. "Melody Adonis"

=== Rah Digga - Dirty Harriet ===
- 04. "What They Call Me"

=== Rob-O - Superspectacular 12" ===
- A4. "Star Qualities"
- B4. "So Many Rappers"

=== Screwball - Y2K: The Album ===
- 08. "You Love to Hear These Stories" (featuring MC Shan)

=== Slum Village - Fantastic, Vol. 2 ===
- 14. "Once Upon a Time" (featuring Pete Rock) (co-produced by J Dilla)
- 00. "Once Upon a Time (Pete Rock remix)"

== 2001 ==
=== Busta Rhymes - Genesis ===
- 04. "Shut 'Em Down 2002"

=== Ed O.G. - The Truth Hurts ===
- 11. "Situations"

=== Guru - Baldhead Slick & da Click ===
- 11. "Pimp Shit" (featuring Keason & Kreem)

=== J-Live - The Best Part ===
- 08. "Kick It to the Beat" (featuring Asheru and Probe)

=== The U.N. - World Domination: The Mixtape ===
- 02. "How You Want It"
- 07. "The Avenue"
- 08. "Nothin' Lesser" {also on Petestrumentals}

== 2002 ==
=== Non Phixion - The Future Is Now ===
- 04. "If You Got Love"

=== Heather B. - Eternal Affairs ===
- 11. "Dedicated" (featuring Tammy Lucas & Pete Rock)

=== Troy S.L.U.G.S. - Get It 4 Real 12" ===
- A1. "Get It 4 Real"

=== Big Tone – Party Crasher ===
- B3. Good Life (featuring 87)

== 2003 ==
=== Keith Murray - He's Keith Murray ===
- 16. "Say Goodnite" (co-produced by Erick Sermon)

=== PMD - The Awakening ===
- 18. "Buckwild"

=== Killa Sha - The Black Eminem ===
- 23. "Iron Hand"

=== Curse - Sinnflut ===
- 05. "Nimm's Leicht"

=== J Dilla - Pay Jay {promo} ===
- 04. "Remember" (featuring Billal)

=== Prozack Turner - Death Taxes & Prozack ===
- 2. Wonderful Life

== 2004 ==
=== Ed O.G. & Pete Rock - My Own Worst Enemy ===
- 01. "Boston"
- 02. "Just Call My Name"
- 03. "Voices"
- 04. "School'em"
- 06. "Pay the Price"
- 08. "Right Now!"
- 09. "Stop Dat"

=== Krumbsnatcha - Never Grow Up / Here We Go 12" ===
- B1. "Here We Go" (featuring Guru)

=== Mr. Cheeks - Ladies & Ghettomen ===
- 03. "All I Know" (featuring Babydoll, and Madman)
- 05. "Keep It Movin"
- 07. "Turn It Up" (featuring Wild Walt, and Madman)

=== Tony Touch - The Piece Maker 2 ===
- 14. "Out da Box" (featuring Large Professor, Masta Ace, and Pete Rock)

=== The UN - UN or U Out ===
- 08. "Ain't No Thang"
- 14. "Game of Death"

=== DJ Rhettmatic – Exclusive Collection ===
- 13. Pete Rock "Collector's Item" (featuring Grap Luva)

=== Northern State - All City ===
- 09. "Time to Rhyme" (featuring Pete Rock)

=== Planet Asia - 7" ===
- A1. "Full Course Meals"

=== Kreators - Live Coverage ===
- 03. "Night Life" (featuring Nicki Richards & Cheryl Pepsii Riley)

=== Roc Marciano - Strength and Honor ===
- 06. "Pimpin' Ain't Easy"
- 10. "Fall Back"

== 2005 ==
=== Jim Jones - Harlem: Diary of a Summer ===
- 03. "G's Up" (featuring Max B)

=== Leela James - A Change Is Gonna Come ===
- "Good Time" (featuring Pete Rock & C.L. Smooth)

=== One Be Lo - Still Born ===
- 13. "Deceptacons" (Pete Rock Remix)

=== Muneshine - Opportunity Knocks ===
- 08. "Imagine That"

== 2006 ==
=== Ghostface Killah - Fishscale ===
- 10. "R.A.G.U." (featuring Raekwon)
- 14. "Be Easy" (featuring Trife da God)
- 17. "Dogs of War" (featuring Raekwon, Cappadonna, Sun God & Trife da God)

=== Masta Killa - Made in Brooklyn ===
- 08. "Older Gods Part 2"

=== CL Smooth - American Me ===
- 11. "It's a Love Thing"

=== Boot Camp Clik - The Last Stand ===
- 06. "1-2-3"

=== Raekwon - The Vatican Mixtape Vol. 1 ===
- 25. "Kids That's Rich"

=== Freddie Foxxx - Street Triumph Mixxxtape ===
- 24. "The Chancellor"
- 30. "U Krazy"

=== Rob-O - Rhyme Pro Mixtape ===
- 06. "Mention Me"
- 09. "Superspectacular"
- 15. "Vernon Villains" (feat. Meccalicious)

=== Pitch Black - Revenge Mixtape ===
- 11. "Block to the Boardroom"

=== Postaboy - Return of a Living Legend Vol.1 Mixtape ===
- 12. "It's the Postaboy"

== 2007 ==
=== Keyshia Cole - Just Like You ===
- 09. "Got to Get My Heart Back"

=== Redman - Red Gone Wild: Thee Album ===
- 04. "Gimmie One"

=== Talib Kweli - Eardrum ===
- 06. "Holy Moly"
- 12. "Stay Around"

=== Styles P - Super Gangster (Extraordinary Gentleman) ===
- 18. "Gangster, Gangster" (performed by The L.O.X.)

=== Special Teamz - Stereotypez ===
- 04. "Boston to Bucktown" (featuring Sean Price and Buckshot)

=== CL Smooth - The Outsider ===
- 13. "Love Is a Battlefield"

=== Skyzoo - Corner Store Classic ===
- 07. "Straighten It Out"

== 2008 ==
=== Jim Jones - Harlem's American Gangster ===
- 11. "Up in Harlem"

=== Termanology - Politics as Usual ===
- 12. "We Killin' Ourselves"
- 15. "Hold That" [Bonus track]

=== Vast Aire - Dueces Wild ===
- 06. "Mecca and the Ox" (featuring Vordul Mega)

=== Muneshine - ===
- "These Days (Remix)" (featuring Emilio Rojas & D-Sisive)

=== Charles Hamilton - Death of the Mixtape Rapper ===
- 01. "Stay on Your Level"

=== Rashid Hadee - A Change Gon’ Come ===
- 27. "Oxygen" (featuring Pugs Atomz)

== 2009 ==
=== Method Man & Redman - Blackout! 2 ===
- 03. "A-Yo" (featuring Saukrates)

=== Raekwon - Only Built 4 Cuban Linx... Pt. II ===
- 03. "Sonny's Missing"

=== Ras Kass - Quarterly ===
- 06. "If This World Was Mine"

=== Red Cafe - ===
- "Heart and Soul of New-York City"

=== Cormega - Born and Raised ===
- 06. "Live and Learn"

=== Earatik Statik - The Good, the Bad and the Ugly ===
- 13. "Tearz!"

=== Krumb Snatcha - Hidden Scriptures ===
- 15. "Yesterday"
- 19. "Begins"

== 2010 ==
=== Cypress Hill - Rise Up ===
- 02. "Light It Up"

=== Ghostface Killah - Apollo Kids ===
- 08. "How You Like Me Baby”

=== Sadat X - Wild Cowboys II ===
- 02. "Turn It Up"

=== Fintelligens - Mun Tie Tai Maantie ===
- 07. "Kaiku"

=== DoItAll - American DU ===
- 05. "Surrender"

=== Kurupt - Streetlights ===
- 06. "Yessir"

== 2011 ==
=== Jay-Z & Kanye West - Watch the Throne ===
- 16. "The Joy" (produced with Kanye West, Mike Dean and Jeff Bhasker) [Bonus track]

=== Styles P - Master of Ceremonies ===
- 06. "Children" (featuring Pharoahe Monch)

=== Torae - For the Record ===
- 06. "That Raw"

=== Catalyst - Cat's Life 2 ===
- 06. "What You Waiting For"

=== Pete Rock & Smif-N-Wessun - Monumental ===
- Album Entire

=== Reks – Rhythmatic Eternal King Supreme ===
- 02. "Thin Line"

== 2012 ==
=== 38 Spesh - Time Served ===
- 21. "Support" (featuring Styles P)

=== Chris Turner - LOVElife Is a Challenge ===
- 15. "Sticky Green"

=== Lord Lhus - Underground Stash ===
- 07. "The Elite Group"

== 2013 ==
=== Ill Bill - The Grimy Awards ===
- 05. "Truth"
- 13. "When I Die" (Remix) [featuring Tia Thomas]

=== N.O.R.E. - Student of the Game ===
- 08. "Vitamins" (featuring Pete Rock)

=== Aer - Strangers ===
- 05. "Tell It Straight" (featuring Guy Harrison)

=== Mack Wilds - New York: A Love Story ===
- 11. "The Art of Fallin"
- 13. "Duck Sauce"

=== Blu - ===
- The Clean Hand

=== Cannibal Ox - Gotham ===
- 13. "Mecca & the Ox"

== 2014 ==
=== Ed O.G - After All These Years ===
- 01. "2 Turntables's & a Mic"
- 04. "Make Music"
- 09. "Let da Horns Blow"

=== Smoke DZA - Dream.ZONE.Achieve ===
- 21. "Achieve"

== 2015 ==
=== The Watch Episode II: Favor the Bold ===
- 07. Dame Grease - After the Show (featuring Niamson)

== 2016 ==
=== Torae - Entitled ===
- 03. "Get Down"

=== Grafh - Pain Killers: Reloaded ===
- 05. "Wrong One" (featuring Royce da 5'9")

=== J Dilla - The Diary ===
- 11. "The Ex" (featuring Billa)

=== Mistah F.A.B. - Son of a Pimp, Pt. 2 ===
- 08. "What Yo Hood Like" (featuring Jadakiss)

=== Smoke DZA - George Kush Da Button (Don't Pass Trump the Blunt) ===
- 15. "Unfuckwittable" (featuring Roc Marciano and Domo Genesis)

=== Sadat X - Agua ===
- 01. "Freeze"

=== De La Soul - and the Anonymous Nobody... ===
- 05. "Memory of... (Us)" [featuring Estelle and Pete Rock] (co-produced by De La Soul and Supa Dave West)

=== Kuro Silence - Kid ===
- 15. "New Kid"

=== Snyp Life - Back Again ===
- 02. "Oh No" (featuring Sheek Louch)

=== The Lox - Filthy America... It's Beautiful ===
- 10. "Filthy America"

=== Smoke DZA & Pete Rock - "Don't Smoke Rock" ===
- Album Entire

== 2017 ==
=== Dane Uno - Everything In the Dark Comes to the Light ===
- 05. "Remedy"

== 2018 ==
=== Apathy - The Widow's Son ===
- 08. "I Keep On" (featuring Pharoahe Monch and Pete Rock)

=== Westside Gunn - Supreme Blientele ===
- 04. "Brutus" (featuring Griselda)
- 13. "The Steiners" (featuring Elzhi)

=== Conway the Machine - Everybody Is F.O.O.D. ===
- 03. "Piper"

=== Kool G Rap & 38 Spesh - Son of G Rap ===
- 11. "Flow Gods" (featuring Freddie Gibbs & Meyhem Lauren)
- 15. "Aborted Child"

=== V-Stylez – Thornton Melon ===
- 04. "Detropolis"

=== Kali Uchis – ===
- 1. "After the Storm [Pete Rock Remix]" (featuring Bootsy Collins & Tyler, The Creator)

== 2019 ==
=== Illa Ghee - The Whole Half of It ===
- 02. "Malvo"

=== Flee Lord - Geats Greater Later ===
- 06. "For a Reason" (featuring Elcamino)

=== Papoose - Underrated ===
- 11. "University of the Streets"

=== Ras Kass - Soul on Ice 2 ===
- 14. "Can u feel it"

=== Nas - The Lost Tapes 2 ===
- 10. "The Art of It" (featuring J. Myers)
- 15. "QueensBridge Politics"

=== Skyzoo & Pete Rock - Retropolitan ===
- Album Entire

=== Smoke DZA & Benny the Butcher - Statue of Limitations ===
- 01. "By Any Means"
- 02. "Bullets" (featuring Conway the Machine)
- 03. "Smoke and Butchered" (featuring Styles P)
- 04. "7:30" (featuring Westside Gunn)
- 05. "Drug Rap"
- 06. "Toast"

=== Flee Lord & Grafh - Dirty Restaurant ===
- 06. "Cold Outside"

== 2020 ==
=== Grafh & DJ Green Lantern – The Oracle III ===
- B4. "Stove Work"

=== M-Dot – Ego and The Enemy (Part 2) ===
- "The Atonement"

=== Busta Rhymes – Extinction Level Event 2: The Wrath of God ===
- 03. "Strap Yourself Down" (co-produced by J Dilla)

=== Kool Taj the Gr8 ===
- "Llayers" (feat. Pete Rock)

=== Hus Kingpin - King of the Underworld ===
- 03. "Situations"

== 2021 ==
=== Papoose - March ===
- 01. "Don't Make You Real"

== 2022 ==
=== Raz Fresco - Magneto Was Right - Issue #8 ===
- 15. "Signs of the Times" (feat. the 6th letter)

=== Paul Wall and Terminology - Start 2 Finish ===
- 03. "Recognize My Car"

=== Westside Gunn - 10 ===
- 11. "Mac Don't Stop"

=== Lady Wray - ===
- B1. "Joy and Pain (Remix)"

=== AZ - Doe or Die 2 ===
- "Check Me Out"

=== Smoke DZA - Money for Dummies ===
- 03. "42"

=== McGyver - Camillionizm ===
- 12. "'89"

== 2023 ==
=== Brandee Younger - Brand New Life ===
- 04. "Livin' and Lovin' in My Own Way" {additional production}

=== RIM - Rembrandt 2: Metal Canvas ===
- 12. "RockIM" (feat. Pete Rock)

== 2024 ==
=== Homeboy Sandman - Turns Out I Can Sell... ===
- 04. "Learning"

=== Pete Rock & Common - The Auditorium Vol. 1 ===
- Entire Album

=== Bugzy Malone - Lost in Meanwhile City ===
- 01. "Life in Meanwhile City"

== 2025 ==
=== De La Soul - Cabin in the Sky ===
- 06. "The Package"
- 12. "Different World" (feat. Gina Loring)
- 17. "Yours" (feat. Common and Slick Rick)
- 18. "Palm of His Hands" (feat. Bilal)

=== Ruste Juxx & Pete Rock - ===
- "Black Fist"

== Remixes ==
=== A Tribe Called Quest ===
- 1nce Again (Pete Rock Remix)

=== Basic Black ===
- She's Mine (Radio Mix) (featuring Pete Rock & CL Smooth)
- She's Mine (Extended Club Mix)
- She's Mine (Hip-Hop Radio Mix)
  - With The Untouchables

=== Big L ===
- Put It On (Pete Rock Remix)

=== The Black Eyed Peas ===
- They Don't Want Music (Pete Rock Remix) (featuring James Brown)

=== Cappadonna ===
- Slang Editorial (Remix)

=== Cormega ===
- Never Personal (Pete Rock Remix)

=== D-Block ===
- Like That Y'all (Remix) (featuring AP, Snyp Life & Straw)

=== Da Beatminerz ===
- Open (Pete Rock Remix) (featuring Caron Wheeler and Pete Rock)

=== Da Youngsta's ===
- Iz U Wit Me? (Pete Rock Remix)
- "Pass Da Mic (Remix)"

=== Das EFX ===
- Jussummen (Pete Rock Remix)

=== F.I.L.T.H.E.E. ===
- Ayayay (Remix) (featuring Ice-T & Grandmaster Caz)

=== G. Huff ===
- "Bills (Remix)" (featuring Smoke DZA)

=== Ghostface Killah ===
- Be Easy (Remix) (featuring Ice Cube & Trife Da God)
- Charlie Brown (Remix)

=== Grand Agent - This Is What They Meant (Ge-ology Remixes) ===
- A3. "This is What They Meant (Pete Rock's Original Version)"

=== Grand Puba ===
- Issues (Pete Rock remix)

=== Incognito ===
- Roots (Pete Rock Remix)

=== Johnny Cash ===
- Folsom Prison Blues (Pete Rock Remix)

=== Kali Uchis ===
- After the Storm (Pete Rock Remix) (featuring Bootsy Collins & Tyler, The Creator)

=== K-Solo ===
- Letterman (Pete Rock Remix)
  - Remix & additional production by Pete Rock & C.L. Smooth

=== Lady Gaga ===
- Poker Face (Pete Rock Remix)

=== Lost Boyz ===
- Renee (Pete Rock Remix)

=== M.O.P. ===
- "Stick To Ya Gunz (Pete Rock Remix)" (featuring Kool G Rap)

=== Mary J. Blige ===
- Reminisce (Pete Rock & CL Smooth Remix)
- Family Affair (Pete Rock Remix) (featuring CL Smooth)

=== Me-2-U - Want U Back 12" ===
- A1. "Want U Back (Pete Rock's Mix)"

=== Michael Jackson ===
- Butterflies (Pete Rock Remix)

=== Mona Lisa ===
- You Said (Pete Rock Remix) (featuring C.L. Smooth)

=== Nas ===
- Favour For A Favour (Pete Rock Remix) (featuring Scarface)
- Street Dreams (Pete Rock Remix) (featuring R. Kelly)

=== Nature ===
- Ultimate High (Pete Rock Remix) (featuring Nas)

=== Nick Holder ===
- No More Dating DJ's (Pete Rock Remixes) (featuring Jemini)

=== Panda Bear ===
- Crosswords (Pete Rock Remix)

=== Pete Rock & CL Smooth ===
- Take You There (Remix)
- Get on the Mic (Remix)
- Lots of Lovin (Remix)
- Searching (Remix)

=== Pushim ===
- Soldier (Pete Rock Remix)

=== Redman ===
- Whateva Man (Pete Rock remix) (featuring Erick Sermon)

=== Ren Thomas ===
- I Been Nice (Remix)

=== Robert Glasper - Black Radio Recovered: The Remix EP ===
- 02. "Black Radio (Pete Rock Remix)" (featuring Yasiin Bey)

=== Rough House Survivers ===
- Rough House (Pete Rock Remix)

=== Scha Dara Parr ===
- Kanata Kara No Tegami (Pete Rock Remix)

=== Scritti Politti ===
- Tinseltown to the Boogiedown (Pete Rock Remix) (featuring Mos Def and Lee Majors)

=== Sister Souljah - Killing Me Softly; Deadly Code Of Silence 12" ===
- A1. "Killing Me Softly; Deadly Code Of Silence (Remix)"

=== Sporty Thievz ===
- Street Cinema 2 (Pete Rock Remix)

=== Steph Pockets - My Crew Deep ===
- 16. "My Crew Deep (Pete Rock Remix)"

=== YG'z ===
- Groove On (Pete Rock Mix)
- Street N*gga (Remix)

=== Yo La Tengo ===
- Here To Fall (Pete Rock Remix)

== Other ==
=== Doo Wop ===
- Back Of Your Mind (featuring Da Ranjahz)
- Do New Things (featuring Joell Ortiz)
- Refuse 2 Lose

=== Fas Action ===
- "I'm The King" (featuring Dubb & Hot Dollar)

=== Freddie Foxxx ===
- "We Gon Win"
- "Rayon"

=== Ghostface Killah ===
- "Chunky"

=== Grap Luva ===
- "Beats & Rhymes"

=== Haph of Da Ranjahz ===
- Back Of Your Mind

=== J Dilla ===
- "Remember" (featuring Bilal)

=== DJ Kay Slay ===
- "Up In Harlem" (featuring Juelz Santana, Hell Rell & JR Writer)

=== Kmac ===
- "Slow Jam"

=== KRS-One ===
- "Go South-Bronx" (featuring Pete Rock)

=== Krumb Snatcha ===
- "Here We Go" (featuring Guru)

=== Talib Kweli ===
- "Brooklyn Story"

=== Meccalicious (Mekolicious) ===
- "Hope The World Don't Stop"
- "How You Feelin"
- "The Youth"
- "Meccalicious (One Time)"
- "Sending This One Out"
- "What You Waitin 4"
- "Slow It Down (Rewind That Part)"

=== Marley Marl and Pete Rock ===
- This Life Forever (co-produced by Marley Marl)

=== Terrace Martin ===
- "Jazz, Soul & Hip-Hop" (featuring Pete Rock)

=== M.O.P. ===
- "Here Comes the Realness" (featuring Pete Rock)

=== Nas ===
- "Analyze This" (featuring Jay-Z & Lord Tariq)

=== Passi ===
- "Who Is This" (featuring Pete Rock & CL Smooth)

=== Planet Asia ===
- Full Course Meal

=== Prozack Turner ===
- Wonderful Life

=== Red Cafe ===
- Heart And Soul Of New-York City

=== Rob-O ===
- If I Die
- War

=== Slick Rick ===
- "World Renown"
- "Gambling"

=== Tommy Tee ===
- "World Renown" (featuring Pete Rock, Mike Zoot, Large Professor and AG)

=== Eddie Wellz ===
- Soular Flare

=== YZ ===
- "Do Or Die (Pete Rock Remix)"
