= Underground Classics =

Compilation album by Pete Rock
- Released: September 19, 2006
- Genre: Hip hop
- Label: Rapster Records
- Producer: Pete Rock

Pete Rock chronology
The Surviving Elements: From Soul Survivor II Sessions (2005)	Underground Classics (2006)	NY's Finest (2008)

Underground Classics is a compilation album by American hip hop musician Pete Rock. The album gathers hard-to-find recordings from 12-inch singles and unreleased albums. All tracks are produced by Pete Rock, while vocals are handled by various guests. In a 2006 interview, Pete Rock stated that BBE Records released the compilation without his permission.

== Track listing ==
- All tracks produced by Pete Rock

Title	Songwriter(s)	Performer(s)
"Nothin' Lesser"	P. Philips	The U.N.
"Give It To Y'all"	P. Philips; P. Coleman; T. Jones	
"Boston"	P. Philips; E. Anderson	Ed O.G.
"Ain't No Thang"	P. Philips; J. Armstron; M. Mar; R. Meyer; J. Hodges	The U.N.
"Game Of Death"	P. Philips; R. Meyer	The U.N.
"Fakin' Jax"	P. Philips; R. Ordino; R. Rousseau; P. Gregory	INI
"Step Up"	P. Philips; R. Ordino; R. Rousseau; P. Gregory	INI
"Back On The Block"	P. Philips; C. Penn	CL Smooth
"The Miltitia [Pete Rock Remix]"	P. Philips; C. Martin; K. Elam; C. Guy; J. Campbell	Gang Starr; Big Shug; Freddie Foxxx
"You Can't Stop The Prophet [Pete Rock Remix]"	P. Philips; C. Martin; K. Davis	Jeru The Damaja
"Situations"	P. Philips; E. Anderson	Ed O.G.
"Stop Dat"	P. Philips; E. Anderson	Ed O.G. Krumbsnatcha
"What You Say"	P. Philips; R. Ordino; R. Rousseau; G. Philips	INI
"Grown Man Sport"	P. Philips; R. Ordino; R. Rousseau; G. Philips	INI
"Center Of Attention"	P. Philips; R. Ordino; R. Rousseau; G. Philips	INI

== Credits ==
- Compiled by Amir Abdullah
