= PeteStrumentals 2 =

Studio album by Pete Rock
- Released: June 23, 2015
- Recorded: 2005–2014
- Genres: Hip Hop, Instrumental hip hop
- Length: 58:50
- Label: Mello Music Group
- Producer: Pete Rock

Pete Rock chronology
Monumental (2011)	PeteStrumentals 2 (2015)	Don't Smoke Rock (2016)

PeteStrumentals 2 is the third instrumental hip hop and fifth overall solo album by hip hop producer Pete Rock. The album was released on June 23, 2015, under Mello Music Group. The album was released a day after Pete's 45th birthday and it serves as a sequel to 2001's PeteStrumentals. The track listing on the album features 20 instrumental tracks that was either unreleased or made by Pete himself. This would be Rock's first instrumental album since 2005's The Surviving Elements: From Soul Survivor II Sessions in nearly over 10 years. A music video for "Cosmic Slop" was also released on YouTube by Mello Music Group. During the release of PeteStrumentals 2, a mixtape called PeteStrumentals 2 The Official J. Rocc Mix was also released as a digital downloadable mp3 format, which it was mixed by J. Rocc paying homage to Pete's latest album. According to Rock, the project PeteStrumentals 3 which features no rapping and no samples, was released on December 11, 2020, on Tru Soul records. It includes Rock's band called "The Soul Brothers", which will provide live band playing as instrumental beats.

== Reception ==
Professional ratings
Aggregate scores
Source	Rating
Metacritic	73/100
Review scores
Source	Rating
Pitchfork Media	7.0/10
Sputnikmusic	4.5/5 stars
The 405	7/10 stars
Exclaim!	7/10 stars
Wordplay Magazine	(positive)
The Roanoke Times	(favorable)
HipHopDX	3.4/5 (2015); 3.5/5 (2016)
RapReviews	7.5/10 stars

The album has received positive reviews from music critics. A publisher from the Associated Press called this album "a celebratory affair. These are beats to cheers to. Beats to reminisce over. Beats that illuminate the grind." Sputnikmusic gave this album a 4.5 rating, calling "it one of the best hip-hop releases of 2015, easily taking the spot for the best instrumental hip-hop release for the year." A Canadian music magazine source Exclaim! gave this album a rating of 7 out of 10; it calls it "listening to this long-gestating follow-up, it would appear that not a whole lot has changed in the interim. That's not to discount the potency or worthiness of the project, but as one of the best hip-hop producers of all time."HipHopDX originally gave this album a 3.4 rating out of 5. However, in 2016, HipHopDX gave this album a 3.5 rating out of 5, calling it "An instrumental album full of jazz and funk samples sure to keep heads nodding."

== Track listing ==
- All songs produced by Pete Rock.

#	Title	Producer(s)	Performer (s)	Time
1	"Heaven & Earth"	Pete Rock	*Instrumental*	3:39
2	"PR 4 Prez"	Pete Rock	*Instrumental*	2:36
3	"Cosmic Slop"	Pete Rock	*Instrumental*	3:21
4	"On & On"	Pete Rock	*Instrumental*	3:03
5	"Beat Goes On"	Pete Rock	*Instrumental*	3:48
6	"Clap Ya Hands (I Feel Good)"	Pete Rock	*Instrumental*	3:25
7	"My My Baby"	Pete Rock	*Instrumental*	2:36
8	"I Wish"	Pete Rock	*Instrumental*	4:17
9	"One, Two, a Few More"	Pete Rock	*Instrumental*	3:32
10	"Air Smoove"	Pete Rock	*Instrumental*	2:35
11	"Gonna Love You"	Pete Rock	*Instrumental*	2:12
12	"90's Class Act (EK)"	Pete Rock	*Instrumental*	2:14
13	"Justice (Brotherhood & Understanding) (Skit) "	Pete Rock	*Instrumental*	0:34
14	"Accelerate"	Pete Rock	*Instrumental*	2:50
15	"Make Me Feel Like"	Pete Rock	*Instrumental*	3:09
16	"Dilla Bounce (R.I.P.)"	Pete Rock	*Instrumental*	3:43
17	"Play Yo Horn"	Pete Rock	*Instrumental*	3:25
18	"BBJones"	Pete Rock	*Instrumental*	3:31
19	"Rootz, Reggae, Kulcha (Instr)"	Pete Rock	*Instrumental*	2:12
20	"You Know Dat"	Pete Rock	*Instrumental*	2:09

== Samples ==
- "Heaven & Earth"
  - "Getaway Train" by The Earth Disciples
  - "The Warnings (Part I)" by David Axelrod
  - "The Stunt Man – Main Theme" by Dominic Frontiere
- "PR 4 Prez"
  - "Funky President (People It's Bad)" by James Brown
- "Cosmic Slop"
  - "Iles Dans L'Espace" by Mandré
- "On & On"
  - "Send My Lover Back" by Black Heat
  - "What's Going On?" by Ohio Players
- "Beat Goes On"
  - "Searchin' for a Dream" by Melba Moore
  - "S.U.S." by Placebo
  - "I Can't See What You See In Me" by The Joneses
  - "Hangin' Downtown" by Cameo
- "Clap Ya Hands (I Feel Good)"
  - "Live Convention '82 (Side A)" by Grand Wizzard Theodore
- "My My Baby"
  - "The Way You Do the Things You Do" by David Porter
- "I Wish"
  - "Wishing on a Star" by Rose Royce
- "One, Two, a Few More"
  - "Sweet Music, Soft Lights and You" by Ace Spectrum
  - "A Few More Kisses to Go" by Isaac Hayes
- "Gonna Love You"
  - "We Will Always Be Together" by The Whatnauts
- "90's Class Act (EK)"
  - "Can I" by Eddie Kendricks
  - "Get Out My Life Woman" by The Mad Lads
  - "You're Gonna Need Me" by Dionne Warwick
- "Justice (Brotherhood & Understanding) (Skit)"
  - "The Human Abstract" by David Axelrod
- "Accelerate"
  - "Do What You Feel by The Rimshots
  - "Music Man (Part II)" by Pleasure Web
- "BBJones"
  - "Storm King" by Bob James
  - "Baby Doll" by The Fatback Band
- "You Know Dat"
  - "My Lady" by Wood, Brass & Steel

== Credits ==
From the CD where as noted:

- Sarah Dalton - Design
- Michael Tolle, Pete Rock - Executive producer
- Joe LaPorta - Mastering
- Jeremy Deputat - Photography

== Charts ==
Chart (2015)	Peak position
US Top R&B/Hip-Hop Albums (Billboard)	20
US Independent Albums (Billboard)	21
