= NY's Finest =

Studio album by Pete Rock
- Released: February 26, 2008
- Genre: Hip hop
- Label: Nature Sounds
- Producers: Pete Rock, DJ Green Lantern

Pete Rock chronology
Underground Classics (2006)	NY's Finest (2008)	Monumental (2011)

NY's Finest is the fourth studio album by hip hop producer and emcee Pete Rock. The album was Rock's first studio album since 2004's Soul Survivor II, and was released on February 26, 2008 through the Nature Sounds record label. The album's cover art was created by Fuse Green and inspired by the cover of James Brown's Hell. The instrumental version of the album was released on May 13, 2008 and includes two additional songs not available on the ordinary release; "It's So G" (which appeared with lyrics by Roc Marciano on the deluxe edition) and "When I Need It" (which later was released with lyrics by Pete Rock on the NBA Live 10 soundtrack).

== Collaborations ==
NY's Finest, as the name suggests, features many of New York City's most respected and successful rap artists. As with previous Pete Rock albums, the album features an array of guest artists, and prior to its completion, Rock expressed interest in collaborating with rappers such as Papoose, Redman, D-Block, Jim Jones, Raekwon & Masta Killa. The album also sees Rock rapping on 7 songs. In December 2007, an EPK was released featuring Rock and other musicians talking about the album and in the studio. The album was to also feature Detroit hip hop act Slum Village, in a song called "Gangsta Boogie", but was taken off the album, probably to keep with theme of the title (however, the North Carolina group Little Brother appears on the song "Bring Y'all Back").

== Use in film ==
The album track "Best Believe" was used in the 2008 Paul Rudd and Seann William Scott comedy Role Models.

== Reception ==
Professional ratings
Review scores
Source	Rating
Allmusic	3.5/5 stars
The A.V. Club	B+
Billboard	(favorable)
The Guardian	3/5 stars
Pitchfork Media	(6.8/10)
PopMatters	(6/10)
RapReviews	(8/10)
Spin	3.5/5 stars
U-WIRE	(favorable)
Village Voice	(favorable)

=== Commercial performance ===
The album debuted at number 193 on the U.S. Billboard 200 chart, selling 3,900 copies in its first week.

The first single is "914", featuring LOX members Styles P and Sheek Louch, backed with B-side "The PJs", featuring Wu-Tang Clan members Raekwon and Masta Killa. A third track, "Gangsta Boogie" featuring Slum Village, was also leaked onto the internet but will be an iTunes exclusive only.

== Track listing ==
All tracks produced by Pete Rock unless noted otherwise.

1. "Pete Intro"
2. "We Roll"
  - Featuring Jim Jones & Max B
  - Samples: "You Don't Have To Change" by Kool & The Gang
3. "Till I Retire"
4. "914"
  - Featuring Sheek Louch & Styles P
5. "Questions"
  - Featuring Royal Flush
  - Samples: "Exercise Run" by Coleridge-Taylor Perkinson
6. "Best Believe"
  - Featuring Redman & LD
7. "Ready Fe War"
  - Featuring Chip Fu & Renee Neufville (Formerly of Zhane)
8. "Don't Be Mad"
  - Produced by DJ Green Lantern
9. "Bring Y'all Back"
  - Featuring Joe Scudda (uncredited) & Little Brother
10. "The Best Secret"
  - Featuring Lords of the Underground
11. "That's What I Am Talking About"
  - Featuring Rell
12. "The PJ's"
  - Featuring Raekwon & Masta Killa
13. "Made Man"
  - Featuring Tarrey Torae
  - Samples: "Take The Time To Tell Her" by Jerry Butler
14. "Let's Go"
  - Featuring Doo Wop
15. "Comprehend"
  - Featuring Papoose
  - Samples: I'm Not In Love by 10cc
16. "Gangsta Boogie"
  - Featuring Slum Village (iTunes Bonus)
  - Samples: "They Long To Be Close To You" by Isaac Hayes
17. "It's So G"
  - Featuring Roc Marciano (Deluxe Edition Bonus)

== Album singles ==
Single information
"We Roll"
- Released: 2008
- B-side:Til' I Retire

== Charts ==
Chart (2008)	Peak position
US Billboard 200	193
US Top R&B/Hip-Hop Albums (Billboard)	42
