= Deputat =

Deputat is a surname. Notable people with the surname include:

- Andrei Deputat (born 1992), Ukrainian pair skater
- Jeremy Deputat (born 1976), American photographer
