= My Own Worst Enemy =

My Own Worst Enemy may refer to:

- My Own Worst Enemy (TV series), an American action/drama TV series
- "My Own Worst Enemy" (Scrubs), an episode of the American TV sitcom Scrubs
- "My Own Worst Enemy" (song), song by rock band Lit
- "My Own Worst Enemy", a song by Napalm Death from Diatribes, 1996
- "My Own Worst Enemy", a song by Saliva from Cinco Diablo, 2008
- "My Own Worst Enemy", a song by Stereophonics from Decade in the Sun: Best of Stereophonics
- My Own Worst Enemy (album), album by Pete Rock with Edo G

== See also ==
- Your Own Worst Enemy (disambiguation)
