= Center of Attention =

Center of Attention or Centre of Attention may refer to:

== Music ==
=== Albums ===
- Center of Attention, an album by InI, released as Lost & Found: Hip Hop Underground Soul Classics

=== Songs ===
- "Centre of Attention", a track on the 2011 album 41 by Andy Lewis
- "Center of Attention" (Mayday Parade song), 2009
