= Kolexxxion =

Studio album by DJ Premier & Bumpy Knuckles
- Released: March 27, 2012
- Recorded: 2001–2004; 2009–2011
- Genre: Hip-hop
- Label: Gracie Productions/Works of Mart
- Producer: DJ Premier & Bumpy Knuckles

DJ Premier chronology
Get Used To Us (2010)	Kolexxxion (2012)	PRhyme (2014)

Bumpy Knuckles chronology
Lyrical Workout (2011)	Kolexxxion (2012)	Ambition (2012)

Singles from Kolexxxion
- 1. "B.A.P. (Bumpy And Premier)" Released: October 28, 2011; 2. "wEaRe aT WaR" Released: January 13, 2012; 3. "Shake the Room" Released: February 21, 2012

Kolexxxion, is a collaborative studio album by DJ/producer DJ Premier and rapper Bumpy Knuckles (a.k.a. Freddie Foxxx). Most of the beats on the album (all produced by DJ Premier except "Word Iz Bond") are beats that were rejected by other artists, such as "B.A.P. (Bumpy And Premier)" (This beat was intended for Jay-Z's 2009 album The Blueprint 3, but by the time DJ Premier had sent it to him, it was too late for the beat to make the cut for the album), and "wEaRe aT WaR" (rejected by Immortal Technique) and "EyEnEvErPuTmY4cUsAwAy" (Premier had himself stated, on Hot 97.5 that he had, on several occasions, sent the beat for rapper Kanye West, but it never made the cut for any of his projects). Some of the songs are previously released collaborations between the two. There are only two guest stars on the album, which are Flavor Flav and Nas. The album was released on March 27.

== Singles ==
"B.A.P. (Bumpy And Premier)"

The first street single on the album. The single was released on October 27, 2011. The single debuted on DJ Premier's radio show Live from HQ. The B-side to "B.A.P." is "OwNiT" (Which he had not showcased to any other artist).

"wEaRe aT WaR"

The second single on the album. It was released on January 13. This is a beat that had already been showcased by DJ Premier to rapper Immortal Technique, who rejected it.

"Shake The Room"

The official 1st single from the album. It was released on February 27, a rejected beat from Busta Rhymes.

== Track listing ==
- All songs produced by DJ Premier, except for track 17 ("Word Iz Bond"), produced by Bumpy Knuckles
- All songs mixed by DJ Premier, except for track 6 ("P.A.I.N.E.") and track 7 ("The Life"), mixed by Eddie Sancho

No.	Title	Writer(s)	Length
1.	"My Thoughts"	J. Campbell, C. Martin	4:03
2.	"Shake the Room" (featuring Flavor Flav)	J. Campbell, C. Martin, W. Drayton Jr.	3:52
3.	"B.A.P. (Bumpy And Premier)"	J. Campbell, C. Martin	5:19
4.	"eVrEEbOdEE"	J. Campbell, C. Martin	2:17
5.	"wEaRe aT WaR"	J. Campbell, C. Martin	3:26
6.	"P.A.I.N.E. (Pressure At Industry Expense)"	J. Campbell, C. Martin	4:30
7.	"The Life"	J. Campbell, C. Martin	3:49
8.	"F.Y.P.A.U. (Fuck Your Punk Ass Up)"	J. Campbell, C. Martin	2:59
9.	"D'Lah"	J. Campbell, C. Martin	4:27
10.	"More Levels"	J. Campbell, C. Martin	4:50
11.	"GrEaTnEsS"	J. Campbell, C. Martin	2:47
12.	"EyEnEvErPuTmY4cUsAwAy"	J. Campbell, C. Martin	4:21
13.	"Turn Up the Mic (DJ Premier Remix)" (featuring Nas)	J. Campbell, C. Martin, N. Jones	3:32
14.	"The Key"	J. Campbell, C. Martin	3:00
15.	"OwNiT"	J. Campbell, C. Martin	2:37
16.	"The Gang Starr Bus"	J. Campbell, C. Martin	2:55
17.	"Word Iz Bond"	J. Campbell	4:09
Total length:			62:53

Deluxe version bonus tracks
No.	Title	Writer(s)	Length
18.	"UnDaGrOuNdGoOn"	J. Campbell, C. Martin	2:03
19.	"Mic & Gun"	J. Campbell, C. Martin	4:00
Total length:			68:56

=== Notes ===
The Kolexxxion (Media notes). DJ Premier & Bumpy Knuckles. (C) Works of Mart (All Rights Reserved). 2012.

#	Title	Notes
	The Kolexxxion	
1	"My Thoughts"	Leaked in 2009.
2	"Shake the Room"	Rejected Busta Rhymes beat.
3	"B.A.P. (Bumpy And Premier)"	Beat made for Jay-Z.
4	"eVrEEbOdEE"	Rejected Fat Joe beat.
5	"wEaRe aT WaR"	Rejected Immortal Technique beat.
6	"P.A.I.N.E. (Pressure At Industry Expense)"	Rejected Jadakiss beat.; Mixed by Eddie Sancho.
7	"The Life"	Mixed by Eddie Sancho.
8	"FYPAU"	
9	"D'Lah"	
10	"More Levels"	
11	"GrEaTnEsS"	Beat made for Nick Javas.
12	"EyEnEvErPuTmY4cUsAwAy"	Rejected Kanye West beat.
13	"Turn Up the Mics (DJ Premier Remix)"	Remix; The original version is produced by Rich 5, and appears on Bumpy Knuckles' single Turn Up the Mics/Teach the Children.
14	"The Key"	
15	"OwNiT"	
16	"The Gang Starr Bus"	The song previously appeared on DJ Premier's 2011 compilation "Year Round Records: Get Used to Us". The instrumental also appeared on Premier's 2011 compilation of rejected beats Beats That Collected Dust, Vol. 2.
17	"Word Iz Bond"	Produced By: Bumpy Knuckles

== Charts ==
Chart (2012)	Peak position
US Billboard 200	195
US Independent Albums (Billboard)	33
US Heatseekers Albums (Billboard)	10
US Top R&B/Hip-Hop Albums (Billboard)	31
