= Industry Shakedown =

Studio album by Bumpy Knuckles
- Released: June 27, 2000
- Recorded: 1999–2000
- Genres: East Coast hip hop; hardcore hip hop
- Length: 1:12:07
- Labels: KJAC Music; Landspeed
- Producers: Freddie Foxxx; Pete Rock; DJ Premier; the Alchemist; Diamond D

Bumpy Knuckles chronology
Freddie Foxxx Is Here (1989)	Industry Shakedown (2000)	Konexion (2003)

Professional ratings
Review scores
Source	Rating
AllMusic	4/5 stars
RapReviews	8.5/10

Industry Shakedown is the second studio album by American East Coast hip hop artist Freddie Foxxx, and his first release under his 'Bumpy Knuckles' alias. It was released on June 27, 2000, via KJAC Music and Landspeed Records, and was produced by DJ Premier, Pete Rock, Diamond D, the Alchemist, and Foxxx. It featured guest appearances from Afrika Bambaataa, M.O.P., Terisa Griffin, and DJ Rukas. The album peaked at number 179 on the Billboard 200. The first single was the DJ Premier-produced "Part of My Life".

== Track listing ==
No.	Title	Producer(s)	Length
1.	"Live @ the Roxy 2000"		1:34
2.	"24 Hrs."	Freddie Foxxx	4:03
3.	"Tell 'Em I'm Here"	The Alchemist	4:30
4.	"Bambaataa and Bumpy Talk Industry" (featuring Afrika Bambaataa)		3:19
5.	"Inside Your Head"	Freddie Foxxx	1:20
6.	"Who Knows Why?"	Pete Rock	4:44
7.	"Searchin'" (featuring Terisa Griffin)	Freddie Foxxx	5:24
8.	"Never Bow Down"	Freddie Foxxx	1:32
9.	"Industry Shakedown"	Pete Rock	4:50
10.	"MC's Come and MC's Go"	Freddie Foxxx	4:48
11.	"Bumpy Bring It Home" (featuring Billy Danze)	Diamond D	4:46
12.	"Live in Tokyo With DJ Rukas"		0:42
13.	"Bumpy Knuckles Baby"	Pete Rock	4:03
14.	"R.N.S."	DJ Premier	4:34
15.	"Stock in the Game"	The Alchemist	4:24
16.	"Intelligent Thug - Bumpy's Theory"	Freddie Foxxx	1:24
17.	"Feel Like I Been Here"	Freddie Foxxx	5:13
18.	"The Mastas" (featuring M.O.P.)	Freddie Foxxx	4:44
19.	"Part of My Life"	DJ Premier	5:05
20.	"Live @ The Roxy 2000 Outro"		1:03
Total length:			1:12:07

== Personnel ==
- James F. Campbell – main artist, producer (tracks: 2, 5, 7–8, 10, 16–18)
- Eric Murray – featured artist (tracks: 11, 18)
- Jamal Grinnage – featured artist (track 18)
- Terisa Griffin – featured artist (track 7)
- Lance Taylor – featured artist (track 4)
- Peter O. Philips – producer (tracks: 6, 9, 13)
- Daniel Alan Maman – producer (tracks: 3, 15)
- Christopher Edward Martin – producer (tracks: 14, 19)
- Joseph Kirkland – producer (track 11)
- Lloyd Price – executive producer
- Trevor "Karma" Gendron – art direction & design
- Lordz of Brooklyn – illustration

== Charts ==
Chart (2000)	Peak position
US Billboard 200	179
US Top R&B/Hip-Hop Albums (Billboard)	34
US Independent Albums (Billboard)	14
US Heatseekers Albums (Billboard)	8
