= Soul Survivor II =

Studio album by Pete Rock
- Released: May 11, 2004
- Recorded: 2003–2004
- Studio: A Touch Of Jazz Studios; Manhattan Center Studios; Jammin' Downtown; Greenhouse Music Studios (Toronto); TMF Studios; Chopp Shopp Studios; The Sandbox Studios (New York, NY); Home Cookin' Studios; The Headquarters (New Jersey); Wu-Tang Productions; RJ Rice Studios; Pay-J Studios
- Genre: Hip-hop
- Length: 1:00:01
- Label: Rapster; BBE
- Producer: Pete Rock

Pete Rock chronology
Lost & Found: Hip Hop Underground Soul Classics (2003)	Soul Survivor II (2004)	Surviving Elements: From Soul Survivor II Sessions (2005)

Singles from Soul Survivor II
- 1. "Warzone" Released: 2004; 2. "It's A Love Thing" Released: 2004

Soul Survivor II is the third studio album by American rapper and hip-hop record producer Pete Rock. It was released on May 11, 2004 via Rapster/BBE Records. Production was entirely handled by Pete Rock himself with mixing and recording engineer Jamey Staub co-producing several of the album's tracks. It features guest appearances from his former partner CL Smooth, as well as dead prez, Denosh, GZA, Kardinal Offishall, Krumb Snatcha, Leela James, Little Brother, Pharoahe Monch, Postaboy, RZA, Skillz, Slum Village and Talib Kweli.

Pete, who dropped verses on the majority of the songs found on his solo debut Soul Survivor, performs only a single verse on this album ("Niggas Know") but handles several choruses throughout. The album's front cover is a nod to the Miles Davis album Tutu, which features the jazz trumpeter in an identical, albeit black and white, portrait shot.

In the United States, the album peaked at number 155 on the Billboard 200, number 27 on the Top R&B/Hip-Hop Albums and number 9 on the Independent Albums charts. It also made it to number 124 in France, and number 23 on the Official Hip Hop and R&B Albums Chart and number 19 on the Official Independent Albums Chart in the UK.

The album spawned two singles: "Warzone" and "It's a Love Thing", both went charted on the US Hot R&B/Hip-Hop Singles Sales chart, reaching number 37 and number 43, respectively.

== Critical reception ==
Professional ratings
Review scores
Source	Rating
AllMusic	4/5 stars
HipHopDX	4/5
Now	2/5 Ns
RapReviews	8.5/10
Rolling Stone	3/5 stars
Spin	B+
Stylus	C+
Vibe	3.5/5

William Ketchum III of RapReviews praised the album, stating: "Rock lets us know that he hasn't lost a step as far as beats go, displaying an uncanny ability of picking the perfect artist for nearly each song on the disc". Nathan Rabin of The A.V. Club wrote that Rock "ill-advisedly strays from his lush, mellow chill-out sound on a handful of tracks".

== Track listing ==
No.	Title	Writer(s)	Producer(s)	Length
1.	"Truth Is" (featuring Black Ice)	Lamar Manson	Pete Rock	3:06
2.	"We Good" (featuring Kardinal Offishall)	Jason Harrow	Pete Rock	4:14
3.	"Just Do It" (featuring Pharoahe Monch)	Troy Jamerson	Pete Rock; Charles "Stitch" Wilson III (add.)	4:32
4.	"Give It to Ya" (featuring Little Brother)	Phonte Coleman; Thomas Jones	Pete Rock	4:48
5.	"It's the Postaboy" (featuring Postaboy)	Sharard Dixon	Pete Rock	4:16
6.	"It's a Love Thing" (featuring C.L. Smooth and Denosh)	Corey Penn; Denosh Bennett	Pete Rock; Jamie Staub (co.)	4:50
7.	"One MC, One DJ" (featuring Skillz)	Donnie Lewis	Pete Rock	3:51
8.	"Beef" (featuring Krumbsnatcha)	Demetrius Gibbs	Pete Rock; Jamie Staub (co.)	4:23
9.	"No Tears" (featuring Leela James)	Alechia Campbell	Pete Rock	3:44
10.	"Head Rush" (featuring RZA and GZA)	Robert Diggs; Gary Grice	Pete Rock; Jamie Staub (co.)	2:07
11.	"Fly Till I Die" (featuring Talib Kweli and C.L. Smooth)	Talib Greene; Penn	Pete Rock; Jamie Staub (co.)	4:16
12.	"Warzone" (featuring dead prez)	Clayton Gavin; Lavonne Alford	Pete Rock; Jamie Staub (co.)	3:57
13.	"Da Villa" (featuring Slum Village)	Jason Powers; R.L. Altman	Pete Rock	5:06
14.	"Niggaz Know" (featuring J Dilla)	James Yancey	Pete Rock	2:18
15.	"Appreciate" (featuring C.L. Smooth)	Penn	Pete Rock; Jamie Staub (co.)	4:33
Total length:				1:00:01

== Personnel ==
- Peter "Pete Rock" Phillips – vocals, producer, mixing, executive producer
- Lamar "Black Ice" Manson – vocals (track 1)
- Jason "Kardinal Offishall" Harrow – vocals (track 2)
- Troy "Pharoahe Monch" Jamerson – vocals (track 3)
- Phonte Coleman – vocals (track 4)
- Thomas "Big Pooh" Jones – vocals (track 4)
- Sharard "Postaboy" Dixon – vocals (track 5)
- Corey "CL Smooth" Penn – vocals (tracks: 6, 11, 15)
- Denosh Bennett – vocals (track 6)
- Donnie "Mad Skillz" Lewis – vocals (track 7)
- Demetrius "Krumbsnatcha" Gibbs – vocals (track 8)
- Alechia "Leela James" Campbell – vocals (track 9)
- Robert "RZA" Diggs – vocals & recording (track 10)
- Gary "GZA" Grice – vocals (track 10)
- Talib Kweli Greene – vocals (track 11)
- Clayton "stic.man" Gavin – vocals (track 12)
- Lavonne "M-1" Alford – vocals (track 12)
- Jason "eLZhi" Powers – vocals (track 13)
- R.L. "T3" Altman III – vocals (track 13)
- James "Jay Dee" Yancey – vocals & recording (track 14)
- Jamie Staub – co-producer (tracks: 6, 8, 10-12, 15), recording (tracks: 1, 4, 6-8, 10-12, 14, 15), mixing
- Charles "Stitch" Wilson III – additional producer (track 3)
- Jeffrey "DJ Jazzy Jeff" Townes – recording (track 1)
- David "Gordo" Strickland – recording (track 2)
- Rod Hui – recording (track 2)
- Daniel Boom – recording (tracks: 3, 9, 15)
- Patrick "9th Wonder" Douthit – recording (track 4)
- Mischa "Big Dho" Burgess – recording (track 4)
- Kamal Blake – recording (track 5)
- Yutaka Kawana – recording (track 5, 6, 12, 15)
- The Elements – recording (track 6)
- Andre Dandridge – recording (track 7)
- Toshi Yoshioka – recording (track 8)
- "Commissioner" Gordon Williams – recording (track 9)
- Adam Kudzin – recording (tracks: 13, 14)
- Ralph J. "Young RJ" Rice Jr. – recording (track 13)
- Eddie Bezalel – co-executive producer, A&R
- Peter Adarkwah – co-executive producer
- Thomas McCallion – art direction, design
- Massimo Gammacurta – photography
- Steve Carty – photography

== Charts ==
Chart (2004)	Peak position
French Albums (SNEP)	124
UK R&B Albums (OCC)	32
UK Independent Albums (OCC)	19
US Billboard 200	155
US Top R&B/Hip-Hop Albums (Billboard)	27
US Independent Albums (Billboard)	9
