= Bombay Monkey =

UK indie-pop electronic music group

Bombay Monkey are a UK indie-pop electronic music group from Crowborough and Royal Tunbridge Wells in Kent, England, United Kingdom

== History ==
The production partnership of Guy Martin and Andrew Phillips was first formed in 2003. The duo created music with Rosko John of Archive and original Scratch Perverts member First Rate, playing their first gigs at The Forum Tunbridge Wells

Bombay Monkey went on to release a series of three, mainly instrumental, electronic albums during the period 2004–2008, with various guest singers and musicians including scratch DJ and producer Mr Thing.

Dave Tonkinsmith (vocals) came on board in 2013 and as the band worked on a series of songs for the album release Dark Flow released on BBE Barely Breaking Even Records in 2014. CJ Thorpe (bass guitar) joined the band in 2016 after performing together at a David Bowie tribute concert.

They are recognizable on stage by their unique custom sun-goggles which, along with their distinctive logo, were created by Brighton-based artist Mark Culmer a.k.a. Medina.

== Members ==
- Andrew Philips - vocals (2003–present)
- Guy Martin - midi/VJ (2003–present)
- Dave Tonkinsmith - vocals (2013–present)
- CJ Thorpe - bass guitar (2016–present)

== Discography ==
=== Albums ===
- Vanish! - Released 2005
- Time Travellers - Released 2006
- 130 Astronauts - Released 2008
- Dark Flow 2014 - Released 2014 BBE Barely Breaking Even Records

=== Production ===
- Contact, Sound Sanctuary, EP 2005
- Dust, Sound Sanctuary, album, 2008
- Kodak Sun, Summit of the Big Low, EP. 2020
- Ghost Ship, CODE, album 2020
- Love And Death, H2SO4 album, 2021
