= Your Own Worst Enemy =

Your Own Worst Enemy may refer to:

- "Your Own Worst Enemy", a song by Alice Cooper on his 2005 album Dirty Diamonds
- "Your Own Worst Enemy", a song by Bruce Springsteen on his 2007 album Magic
- "Your Own Worst Enemy", a song by They Might Be Giants on their 1996 album Factory Showroom
- Your Own Worst Enemy, a 1981 British television documentary featuring Rob Buckman

== See also ==
- My Own Worst Enemy (disambiguation)
