= Audrey Powne =

Australian producer and multi-instrumentalist

- Occupations: Musician; producer; singer; songwriter
- Instruments: Trumpet; vocals
- Years active: 2018–present
- Labels: BBE (2023-present)
- Website: www.audreypowne.com

Audrey Powne is an Australian producer and multi-instrumentalist from Melbourne, based in the United Kingdom.

== Early life ==
Powne completed a Bachelor of Music (Honours) at Monash University in 2012 before becoming a music teacher in Melbourne.

== Career ==
Powne released her debut single "Flowers" in June 2018. Sosefina Fuamoli from The AU Review said "Debut single 'Flowers' positions Powne firmly within the embraces of lush pop, bringing together swelling orchestral production with a vocal quality rich in soul and melody. Taking the listener through a story of loss and heartbreak, Powne engages with a familiar songwriting trope but where 'Flowers' shines in its delivery and presentation".

Powne released her debut EP Bed I Made in 2020. The EP received positive reviews from Earmilk, NME and Bandcamp Daily.

In 2023, Powne signed with BBE and released her debut album From the Fire in April 2024.Powne wrote and produced the album and played trumpet and keys and arranged the strings.

=== Other work ===
Formed in 2016, Powne is a member of r&b group Leisure Centre. In 2018, the group released the album Mind Full.

Formed in 2016, Powne is a member of electronic duo Au Dré with James Bowers. They released a self-titled album in 2018,

Formed in 2021, Powne is a member of jazz quartet Aura. They released a self-titled album in 2021 and Same Sky in 2023.

== Discography ==
=== Albums ===
List of albums with selected details
Title	Album details
From the Fire	Released: 24 April 2024; Label: BBE (BBE753ALP); Format: Vinyl, digital download

=== Extended Plays ===
List of albums with selected details
Title	Album details
Bed I Made	Released: September 2020; Label: Audrey Powne; Format: digital download

== Awards and nominations ==
=== ARIA Music Awards ===
The ARIA Music Awards is an annual awards ceremony that recognises excellence, innovation, and achievement across all genres of Australian music. They commenced in 1987.

Year	Nominee / work	Award	Result	Ref.
2024	From the Fire	Best Jazz Album	Nominated	

=== Australian Music Prize ===
The Australian Music Prize (the AMP) is an annual award of $50,000 given to an Australian band or solo artist in recognition of the merit of an album released during the year of award. They commenced in 2005.

Year	Nominee / work	Award	Result	Ref.
2024	From the Fire	Australian Music Prize	Nominated	

=== Music Victoria Awards ===
The Music Victoria Awards, are an annual awards night celebrating Victorian music. The commenced in 2005.

Year	Nominee / work	Award	Result	Ref.
2021	Audrey Powne	Best Jazz Act	Nominated	
2024	Audrey Powne	Best Solo Artist	Won	
