= Return of the SP1200 =

Studio album by Pete Rock
- Released: April 13, 2019 (Record Store Day) (Vinyl); April 26, 2019 (CD)
- Recorded: 1990–1997; 1998 (beats, instruments); 2017–2018
- Studio: Marek Stycos Aka Audio Alchemist Hitar Studio
- Genre: Hip hop, Instrumental hip hop
- Length: 54:07
- Label: Tru Soul
- Producer: Pete Rock

Pete Rock chronology
Lost Sessions (2017)	Return of the SP1200 (2019)	Retropolitan (2019)

Professional ratings
Review scores
Source	Rating
RapReviews	6.5/10 stars

Return of the SP1200 is the fourth instrumental hip hop album by hip hop producer Pete Rock. The album was released on April 13, 2019 (Record Store Day) exclusively on vinyl on Rock's latest imprint, Tru Soul Records. The physical release of the album was on April 26. The album contains 15 tracks that are instrumentals that were produced between the years 1990–1998. It includes additional scratches by J. Rocc of the Beat Junkies. The album cover was created by Sanford Greene to illustrate the events of 2016–2019 in the United States. This was the first time in Rock's career that his instrumental beats from the 1990s were released.

== Track listing ==
No.	Title	Length
1.	"Dreamer"	3:47
2.	"Harps of Heaven"	2:34
3.	"Round Midnight"	3:10
4.	"Hope the World Don't Stop (Before I Get Mines)"	5:31
5.	"Neo Funk"	4:58
6.	"Kool Jazz"	2:22
7.	"Gutta Music"	2:22
8.	"Death Becomes You"	4:11
9.	"Live from the Basement (Up, Up and Away)"	2:32
10.	"Traveling Man"	2:33
11.	"Street Dreams"	3:11
12.	"Below O"	5:01
13.	"A Khalimba Story"	5:05
14.	"Food 4 Thought"	4:59
15.	"Take A Knee"	1:46
Total length:		54:07

== Credits ==
From the CD :

- David Kutch – Mastering
- Pete Rock – Producer, Sampler, E-mu Systems SP-1200
- Jamie Staub – mixing
- Marek Stycos – Recording
- J. Rocc – Turntables [Scratches]

== Charts ==
Chart (2019)	Peak position
US Independent Albums (Billboard)	38
