= PeteStrumentals =

Studio album by Pete Rock
- Released: May 1, 2001
- Recorded: 1990–2001
- Studio: Greene Street Studios in New York City, NY
- Genre: Hip hop, instrumental hip hop
- Length: 65:56
- Label: BBE Records
- Producer: Pete Rock

Pete Rock chronology
Soul Survivor (1998)	PeteStrumentals (2001)	Lost & Found: Hip Hop Underground Soul Classics (2003)

Professional ratings
Review scores
Source	Rating
AllMusic	4/5 stars
RapReviews	10/10 stars
Rolling Stone	favorable

PeteStrumentals is the second studio album from hip hop producer/rapper Pete Rock. The album is an Instrumental hip hop album and the second installment of BBE Records Beat Generation series, following Jay Dee's Welcome to Detroit album. The instrumental songs were originally recorded between 1990 and 1995, but were remixed and continued when putting together the album. All songs featuring vocals (The U.N., Freddie Foxxx, C.L. Smooth & Nature) were recorded exclusively for this project between 2000 and 2001.

== Background ==
There are two versions of this album. On the first version, twelve of the fourteen tracks are instrumentals, and the tracks "Cake" and "Nothin' Lesser" both feature rapping from The UN. On the second, five out of sixteen tracks feature vocals from The UN, Freddie Foxxx, Nature, and Rock's former partner, CL Smooth. The updated version of the album was a result of Rock being blown away by Jay Dee's Welcome to Detroit which made him feel he needed to better his own contribution to the Beat Generations series. The 10 year anniversary expanded and limited edition of PeteStrumentals was released on May 10, 2011 on BBE Records. Featuring the original 2001 album tracks on disc one. Disc two is a bonus disc featuring all the 12" inch singles from the album, including a remix of "Back on the Block" featuring CL Smooth, a clean version of "Cake" featuring The UN, and a cappella and instrumental versions of "Back on the Block", "Nothin' Lesser", "Mind Frame" & "Give it to Y'all". Along with "Outro" instrumental.

A sequel, PeteStrumentals 2, was released on June 23, 2015. Another sequel by Rock, PeteStrumentals 3 was released on December 11, 2020. A fourth installment to Rock's PeteStrumentals series, PeteStrumentals 4 was later announced and released on March 31, 2022.

== Critical reception ==
A publisher from Sputnikmusic called PeteStrumentals "a musical gem and a definite hip-hop classic, delivering more of the thumping and laid-back grooves that the acclaimed producer is known for. The jazz-laced and soulful production is classic, with easily enjoyable beats that will certainly get you to at least attempt a freestyle or two to the instrumental tracks." Exclaim! wrote "This release is the second in BBE's quickly burgeoning Beat Generation series; unlike the first guest Jay Dee, and as the title suggests, Pete keeps things largely instrumental by only inviting MCs on a couple of tracks."

== Track listing ==
=== First edition ===
- All tracks produced by Pete Rock

#	Title	Performer (s)
1	"A Little Soul"	Instrumental
2	"Play Dis Only At Night"	Instrumental
3	"Something Funky"	Instrumental
4	"For The People"	Instrumental
5	"Hip Hopcrisy"	Instrumental
6	"Smooth Sailing"	Instrumental
7	"Pete's Jazz"	Instrumental
8	"The Boss"	Instrumental
9	"Get Involved"	Instrumental
10	"Give It To Y'all"	Instrumental
11	"Walk On By"	Instrumental
12	"Cake"	Pete Rock, The UN
13	"What You Waiting For"	Instrumental
14	"Nothin' Lesser [Jamie's Mix]"	Pete Rock, The UN

=== Second edition ===
- All tracks produced by Pete Rock

#	Title	Performer(s)
1	"A Little Soul"	Instrumental
2	"Play Dis Only At Night"	Instrumental
3	"Something Funky"	Instrumental
4	"For The People"	Instrumental
5	"To My Advantage"	Nature
6	"Smooth Sailing"	Instrumental
7	"Pete's Jazz"	Instrumental
8	"Back On The Block"	Pete Rock & CL Smooth
9	"The Boss"	Instrumental
10	"Get Involved"	Instrumental
11	"Nothin' Lesser"	The UN
12	"Walk On By"	Instrumental
13	"Take The D Train"	Instrumental
14	"Mind Frame"	Freddie Foxxx
15	"Cake"	Pete Rock, The UN
16	"Outro"	Pete Rock

== 2011 10th Anniversary Edition ==
=== Disc 1 ===
The first disc has the same track listing as the Second Edition.

=== Disc 2 ===
- All tracks produced by Pete Rock

#	Title	Performer(s)
1	"Back On Da Block (E.Q. Bonus RMX)"	CL Smooth
2	"Back On Da Block (Instrumental)"	Instrumental
3	"Back On Da Block (A Cappella)"	CL Smooth
4	"Back On Da Block (Pete's Block Barty Dub)"	CL Smooth
5	"Nothin' Lesser (Jamie's Mix)"	The UN
6	"Nothin' Lesser (Instrumental)"	Instrumental
7	"Nothin' Lesser (A Cappella)"	The UN
8	"Hip Hopcrisy"	Instrumental
9	"Mind Frame (Instrumental)"	Instrumental
10	"Mind Frame (A Cappella)"	Freddie Foxxx
11	"Give It To Y'All"	Instrumental
12	"Give It To Y'All (Instrumental)"	Instrumental
13	"Give It To Y'All (A Cappella)"	unknown
14	"What You Waiting For"	Instrumental
15	"Cake (Clean Version)"	Pete Rock, The UN
16	"Outro (Instrumental)"	Instrumental

== Album singles ==
Single information
"Back on Da Block"
- Released: 2001
- B-side:
"Mind Frame"
- Released: 2001
- B-side: "Back on Da Block"
"Nothin' Lesser"
- Released: 2001
- B-side: "Give It to Y'all"

== Charts ==
=== Album ===
Chart (2001)	Peak position
US Top R&B/Hip-Hop Albums (Billboard)	61
US Independent Albums (Billboard)	21

=== Singles ===
Year	Song	Chart positions		
Year	Song	Billboard Hot 100	Hot R&B/Hip-Hop Singles & Tracks	Hot Rap Singles
2001	Nothin' Lesser	-	-	33
