= Freddie Foxxx Is Here =

Studio album by Freddie Foxxx
- Released: 1989
- Studio: Power Play (New York, NY)
- Genre: Hip hop
- Length: 56:03
- Label: MCA
- Producers: Eric B.; Freddie Foxxx

Freddie Foxxx chronology
Freddie Foxxx Is Here (1989)	Industry Shakedown (2000)

Singles from Freddie Foxxx Is Here
- 1. "The Master" Released: 1989; 2. "Somebody Else Bumped Your Girl" Released: 1989

Professional ratings
Review scores
Source	Rating
AllMusic	2/5 stars
RapReviews	5.5/10

Freddie Foxxx Is Here is the debut studio album by American East Coast hip hop artist Freddie Foxxx. It was released in 1989 via MCA Records and was produced by Foxxx and Eric B.

== Track listing ==
All music is composed by Louis Eric Barrier and James F. Campbell.

No.	Title	Writer(s)	Length
1.	"The Master"	J. Campbell	3:23
2.	"Somebody Else Bumped Your Girl"	J. Campbell	5:02
3.	"The Ladies Jam"	J. Campbell	4:32
4.	"Forever"	J. Campbell	5:07
5.	"Stop, Look and Listen"	J. Campbell	4:05
6.	"Serious"	J. Campbell	5:23
7.	"Ain't No Sunshine"	B. Withers	4:24
8.	"Keep Doin' It Like This"	J. Campbell	4:28
9.	"Busted"	J. Campbell	4:18
10.	"Make 'Em Feel It"	J. Campbell	5:13
11.	"Freddie Foxxx Is Here"	J. Campbell	4:01
12.	"I'm Ready"	J. Campbell	5:26
Total length:			56:03

Sample credits

- Track 1 contains elements from "Give It Up or Turnit a Loose (Remix)" by James Brown (1986)
- Track 3 contains elements from "Escape-Ism" by James Brown (1971)
- Track 5 contains elements from "Apache" by Incredible Bongo Band (1973), "Change the Beat (Female Version)" by Beside (1982), and "Raptivity" by Ronnie Gee (1980)
- Track 8 contains elements from "Breakin' Bread" by Fred & the New J.B.'s (1974) and "La Di Da Di" by Doug E. Fresh & Slick Rick (1985)
- Track 9 contains elements from "UFO" by ESG (1981)
- Track 10 contains elements from "Funky Sensation" by Gwen McCrae (1981)
- Track 11 contains elements from "Funky Drummer" by James Brown (1970)
- Track 12 contains elements from "I'm Gonna Love You Just a Little More Baby" by Barry White (1973) and "You Gotta Come Out Fresh" by Supreme Force (1986)

== Personnel ==
- James F. Campbell – main artist, producer, songwriter (tracks: 1–6, 8–12)
- Louis Eric Barrier – producer
- DJ Kut Terrorist – scratches
- "Lazer" Mike Rhodes – engineering
- D'Anthony Johnson – engineering
- Patrick Peter Owen Adams – recording
- Elai Shuma Lii Tubo – recording
- Carlton S. Batts – mastering
- Glen E. Friedman – design & photography
- Cey Adams – artwork
