= Rim Kwaku Obeng =

Rim Kwaku Obeng was a Ghanaian disco composer, drummer, percussionist, and multi-instrumental musician.

He performed with the Uhuru Dance Band in the early 1970s and became a session musician in California, but his career growth as a musician was intercepted multiple times by fellow band member Duke Oketa. Following a series of hardships, he successfully recorded two afrobeat albums in America.

His two albums, Rim Arrives and Too Tough, were recorded in the late 1970s and had been previously considered lost. The albums gained renewed interest after BBE Records reissued them in 2015.

In 2015, Far Out described Rim Arrives and Too Tough as "two of the greatest records in Afro-disco history".

In 1979, the University of California, Los Angeles listed Obeng as a prominent influence alongside Stevie Wonder, Barry White, the Jacksons, Angela Bofill, and Earth, Wind & Fire, who popularized music that combined "traditional African musical forms with contemporary Afro-American" music.

== History ==
Rim Kwaku Obeng was born Samuel K. Mfojo.

By the early 1970s, he was a member of the Uhuru Dance Band, a Ghanaian highlife group that pioneered the afro disco genre.

In 1973, he was invited to Los Angeles's A&M Studios for a session alongside bandmember Duke Oketa. Oketa hired a "massive" string section, but he did not provide sheet music, and the orchestra was unable to perform. The recording session was postponed for a week, during which Obeng wrote a score for the music. Obeng received $700, as well as a work offer from American producer Quincy Jones, who was impressed with Obeng's scoring. However, Duke Oketa intervened and threatened a lawsuit if Obeng accepted the offer and departed from their partnership.

The same year, he flew to London with Uhuru Dance Band to record with English rock band Traffic and singer-songwriter Joan Armatrading. However, Duke Oketa abandoned Obeng by checking out of their hotel the first night, taking Obeng's passport and luggage with him. As a result, Obeng became undocumented and dispossessed in London. Although he had "the sympathy of the hotel staff", Obeng was soon homeless. He spent 6 months in 1973 on the streets of London, living on peanuts and tea, and sleeping in phone booths, hallways, and under bridges.

During his homelessness, he passed by Ronnie Scott's Jazz Club where Armatrading happened to be performing. After their chance meeting, Armatrading helped "get his life back on track" by setting him up as a drummer during her band's rehearsals.

He copyrighted several songs, including "Be Yourself" and "Sunkwa" in the first half of 1975 with Rosalind Publishing.

He returned to San Francisco in 1977, where he recorded his debut album, Rim Arrives, which was released in 1980. It was long-considered a "lost" album until its 21st century reissue. OkayAfrica described it as "a dance-worthy blend of funk, disco and afrobeat hoisted by catchy call-and-response lyrics". Highlights of Rim Arrives include "International Funk," which Exclaim! described as "a synth and drum machine concoction that delivers an anti-drug, anti-child abuse message".

His 1982 album Too Tough was also recorded in San Francisco. The album was a collaboration between Obeng and K.A.S.A. Lyrics of Too Tough's first song, "Shine the Ladies", include philosophies such as descriptions of positive and negative thinking, as well as questions such as, "Now, a woman and a man: who is the boss of the house?" with the chorus answering: "Nobody; they're all equal".

=== 21st century ===
In 2015, Barely Breaking Even Records re-released both his "super rare afro disco LPs", to rescue his music from obscurity.

The same year, Far Out summarized his relationship with Oketa: "Rim never did find out why Oketa abandoned him, but it is safe to say that the percussionist had the last laugh".

== See also ==
- History of disco
