= Freddie Foxxx =

American rapper (born 1969)

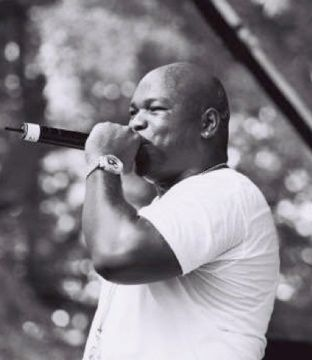

Background information
- Also known as: Bumpy Knuckles
- Born: James Campbell; March 27, 1969 (age 57); Long Island, New York, U.S.
- Genres: Hip hop
- Occupations: Rapper; record producer
- Years active: 1986–present
- Labels: MCA; Epic; SME; Landspeed/Traffic; Barely Breaking Even

James Campbell (born March 27, 1969), is an American rapper and record producer, better known by his stage names Freddie Foxxx and Bumpy Knuckles.

== Biography ==
Foxxx started rapping in the early 1980s.

In 1986, he recorded "You Gotta Come Out Fresh / Handling Things" under the alias Freddie C. as a member of the Supreme Force (other members were Cool Cee and Easy E) on NIA Records. Later in 1986 he was slated to meet with producer Eric B. who was searching for an MC to pair up with; Foxxx missed the meeting, and Eric B. ended up pairing up with MC Rakim and forming the group Eric B. and Rakim.

Despite this, Foxxx's first LP, Freddie Foxxx Is Here, was produced entirely by Eric B. and Foxxx, and was released in 1989 through MCA Records. He soon parted ways with the label and became a member of Queen Latifah's Flavor Unit establishment. In 1993, only promo copies of his second album, Crazy Like A Foxxx, were circulated when Epic Records decided to shelve it.

Foxxx then began to be known more for his cameos on songs by Boogie Down Productions, Naughty by Nature, M.O.P., O.C. and, most notably, his appearance on Gang Starr's The Militia from their Moment of Truth album (1998). The song was issued as a single, building a buzz for Foxxx and helping him to prep for his next full-length release.

This time around he applied the lessons he'd learned from previous experiences with major record labels, and went the independent route. The Industry Shakedown album featured production from hip hop heavyweights DJ Premier, Pete Rock and The Alchemist. The members of M.O.P. provided the album's only cameo.

After the success of Industry Shakedown, Foxxx released his fourth album, The Konexion (2003) via Barely Breaking Even. A less commercially successful affair, the album was nevertheless faithful to its predecessor in terms of style and content and featured contributions from frequent collaborator DJ Premier and DJ Clark Kent.

Foxxx made significant contributions to the WWE SmackDown! vs. Raw 2006 soundtrack. He contributed two songs, and made a guest appearance on another song. He also produced all of the hip hop songs. He also appeared on John Cena's WWE released album You Can't See Me.

In 2006, Foxxx released the Street Triumph Mixxxtape under BBE. He also announced an album titled "Amerikkkan Black Man" and released singles including a DJ Premier-produced title track and a song titled "The King Is Down", a Rakim diss track. The album was shelved, however, in favor of his EP Stoodiotyme and next album KoleXXXion with DJ Premier, which Foxxx began recording for in early 2010 and released in 2012 under Gracie Productions.

Bumpy Knuckles’ previously shelved second album Crazy Like a Foxxx, finally saw a major official release on July 29, 2008, on Fat Beats Records.

== Discography ==
=== Albums ===
- 1989: Freddie Foxxx Is Here (MCA Records)
- 1994: Crazy Like a Foxxx (Fat Beats Records)
- 2000: Industry Shakedown (Landspeed Records)
- 2003: Konexion (BBE)
- 2010: Music From The Man Vol.1 (with Jesse West)
- 2011: Royalty Check (with KRS-One)
- 2011: Lyrical Workout (with Statik Selektah)
- 2012: KoleXXXion (with DJ Premier) US No. 195 US R&B No. 31 US Rap No. 22 US Independent No. 33
- 2012: Ambition (with Statik Selektah)
- 2018: Pop Duke, Vol. 1 (Produced by Nottz)

=== Appearances ===
- 1986: "You Gotta Come Out Fresh"/"Handling Things" 12" release by Supreme Force (NIA Records) - No Album
- 1990: "Money in the Bank" (from the Kool G Rap & DJ Polo album Wanted:Dead or Alive, also featuring Large Professor & Ant Live)
- 1991: "Heal Yourself" (from the H.E.A.L. Foundation 12" single)
- 1992: "Ruff Ruff" + "The Original Way" (from the Boogie Down Productions album Sex and Violence)
- 1993: "Hot Potatoe" (from the Naughty by Nature album 19 Naughty III)
- 1993: "Roll wit the Flava" + "Rough Enough" (from the Flavor Unit album Roll wit the Flava)
- 1994: "One of Those Nightz" (from The Almighty RSO EP Revenge of da Badd Boyz)
- 1995: "Let's Be Specific" (from the Funkmaster Flex album The Mix Tape, Volume 1: 60 Minutes of Funk, also featuring Raekwon, Tragedy Khadafi, Cool Whip & Havoc)
- 1997: "Win the G (as Bumpy Knuckles)" [from the O.C. album Jewelz]
- 1997: "M.U.G. (as Freddie Foxxx)" [from the O.C. album Jewelz]
- 1998: "The Militia" (from the Gang Starr album Moment of Truth, also featuring Big Shug)
- 1998: "I Luv" (from the M.O.P. album First Family 4 Life)
- 1998: "M.O.B" (from the Hussein Fatal album In the Line of Fire)
- 1999: "Pimpin' Ain't Easy" (from the soundtrack to Black Gangster)
- 1999: "Kamikaze" (from the Crown Lee album The Triangle)
- 2000: "Keith & Bumpy" (from the Kool Keith album Matthew)
- 2000: "Patch Up the Pieces" (from the Muro album Pan Rhythm: Flight No. 11154)
- 2000: "U Don't Wanna B.D.S." (from the De La Soul album Art Official Intelligence: Mosaic Thump)
- 2000: "Family Ties" (from the Missin' Linx album Exhibit A)
- 2001: "Mind Frame" (from the Pete Rock album PeteStrumentals)
- 2001: "How We Ride" (from Da Beatminerz album Brace 4 Impak)
- 2002: "Scram" (from the DJ Jazzy Jeff album The Magnificent)
- 2002: "Ashes to Ashes" (from the Naughty By Nature album IIcons)
- 2002: "Masquerade" (from the Wyclef Jean album Masquerade, also featuring Miri & M.O.P.)
- 2003: "Capture (Militia Pt. 3)" [from the Gang Starr album The Ownerz, also featuring Big Shug]
- 2003: "Misery" (from the Lordz of Brooklyn album Graffiti Roc, also featuring IP)
- 2005: "Flow Easy", "Keep Frontin'", "Know the Rep", + "Bad, Bad Man" (from the John Cena album You Can't See Me)
- 2005: "Sic a Niguz" (from the Big Shug album Who's Hard?)
- 2008: "If We Can't Build" (from Akrobatik album Absolute Value)
- 2008: "Prison Planet" (from the East Coast Avengers album Prison Planet)
- 2008: "Damage" [from the DJ Revolution album King of the Decks, also featuring Blaq Poet]
- 2009: "Bumpy's Message" (skit on the MF Doom album Born Like This)
- 2009: "B. Boy" (from the Tech N9ne album K.O.D., also featuring Big Scoob, Kutt Calhoun & Skatterman)
- 2010: "Take Money" (from the Marco Polo & Ruste Juxx album The eXXecution, also featuring Rock)
- 2011: "DAMU" (from the Big Scoob album Damn Fool, also featuring Skatterman, Messy Marv & Jay Rock)
- 2012: "Dumpin' Em All" (from the DJ Nu-Mark album Broken Sunlight)
- 2014: "It's Nothin'" (from the Diamond D album The Diam Piece, also featuring Fat Joe & Chi-Ali)
- 2014: "The Beast" (from The Audible Doctor album Can't Keep the People Waiting)
- 2016: "Cold Freezer" (from the Kool Keith album Feature Magnetic)
- 2016: "Downward Spiral" (from the Ras Kass album Intellectual Property: SOI2, also featuring Onyx)
- 2016: "A.B.N" (from the Big Scoob album H.O.G., also featuring Killer Mike)
- 2017: "4 tha OG'z" (from the MC Eiht album Which Way Iz West)
- 2018: "Going Crazy" (from the Myzery album PARA LA ISLA 20TH ANNIVERSARY EDITION)
- 2019: "Veterans Day" (from the Frank n Dank album St. Louis, also featuring B-Real)
- 2019: "Take Flight (Militia, Pt. 4)" [from the Gang Starr album One of the Best Yet, also featuring Big Shug]

== Filmography ==
Year	Title	Role	Notes
1993	Who's the Man?	Bartender	
1993	Philadelphia	Hospital Patient No. 1	
