= The Surviving Elements: From Soul Survivor II Sessions =

Studio album by Pete Rock
- Released: January 31, 2005
- Genre: Hip Hop
- Length: 76:25
- Label: BBE Records
- Producer: Pete Rock

Pete Rock chronology
Soul Survivor II (2004)	The Surviving Elements: From Soul Survivor II Sessions (2005)	Underground Classics (2006)

Professional ratings
Review scores
Source	Rating
Stylus	B link
Uptown	B+ link
Pitchfork Media	6.8/10

The Surviving Elements: From Soul Survivor II Sessions is the second instrumental album from Hip Hop producer Pete Rock. The album features leftover beats that were created during the recording of Pete's 2004 album Soul Survivor II. According to Pete Rock himself, BBE released this album without his permission and neglected to clear the samples used for some of the tracks. Legal action was taken against the label by Pete. The Surviving Elements was re-released on January 13, 2009. Featuring the original 15 album tracks. The track "Placebo" eventually became Northern State's "Time to Rhyme." Two other tracks have been eventually used by other artists - "Hop, Skip & Jump" was used for Aer's "Tell it Straight" while "Midnight and You" was used for Mac Miller's "Thanks for Coming Out".

== Track listing ==
No.	Title	Length
1.	"You Remind Me"	5:12
2.	"Hop, Skip & Jump"	5:12
3.	"(Pimp) Strut"	4:58
4.	"Glowing"	4:57
5.	"Smoking Room Only"	4:34
6.	"Flying"	5:11
7.	"Marching On"	5:26
8.	"Placebo"	5:04
9.	"Standard"	4:57
10.	"Midnight and You"	5:03
11.	"Fairground"	5:12
12.	"Stormy Weather"	5:11
13.	"Hip 2 Hip"	5:40
14.	"U Are What U Are"	5:23
15.	"Intrigue"	4:25

== Samples ==
- "You Remind Me"
  - "You Ought to Be With Me" by Al Green
- "Hop, Skip & Jump"
  - "It's Time for Peace" by Hamilton Bohannon
  - "Save Their Souls" by Hamilton Bohannon
  - "All I Need Is You" by Starshine
- "(Pimp) Strut"
  - "Butterfly" by Herbie Hancock
  - "Give Me Your Love" by Curtis Mayfield
- "Glowing"
  - "Hold Tight" by Change
- "Smoking Room Only"
  - "Give Me Your Love" by Curtis Mayfield
- "Flying"
  - It's Time for Peace" by Hamilton Bohannon
- "Marching On"
  - "This Masquerade" by Sérgio Mendes & Brasil '77
- "Placebo"
  - "S.U.S." by Placebo
  - "Were Gonna Make it Big" by Baby Washington & Don Gardner
- "Standard"
  - "When I'm Gone" by The Jones Girls
- "Midnight and You"
  - "Winter Sadness" by Kool & the Gang
- "Fairground"
  - "E.V.A." by Jean-Jacques Perrey
- "Hip 2 Hip"
  - "Never Stopped Loving You" by Tyrone Davis
  - "She's Strange" by Cameo
- "U Are What U Are"
  - "Ain't That Loving You (For More Reasons Than One)" by Johnnie Taylor
  - "Get Out of My Life, Woman" by The Mad Lads
- "Intrigue"
  - "Coastin' and Crashin' (Pt. 1)" by The Rimshots
