= Retropolitan =

Studio album by Skyzoo & Pete Rock
- Released: September 20, 2019
- Recorded: 2017–2019
- Studio: Cook It Up, New York City; DaMan Pro, New York City; Stankonia, Atlanta, Georgia
- Genre: Hip hop
- Length: 46:26
- Label: Mello Music Group
- Producer: Pete Rock

Pete Rock chronology
Return of the SP1200 (2019)	Retropolitan (2019)	PeteStrumentals 3 (2020)

Skyzoo chronology
In Celebration of Us (2018)	Retropolitan (2019)	All the Brilliant Things (2021)

Singles from Retropolitan
- 1. "It's All Good" Released: August 12, 2019

Professional ratings
Review scores
Source	Rating
Exclaim!	8/10 stars
HipHopDX	4.4/5

Retropolitan is a collaborative studio album by rapper Skyzoo and producer Pete Rock. The album was released on September 20, 2019 on Mello Music Group. The album was entirely produced by Pete Rock. The album features guest appearances, including Westside Gunn, Conway the Machine, Benny the Butcher, Styles P, Elzhi, Raheem DeVaughn and Pete Rock. The song "It's All Good" become the first single off the album and it features a music video released by Mello Music Group.

== Critical reception ==
The album has received positive attention from music critics. One publisher from Exclaim! gave this album 8 out of 10, saying "Together, these elements elevate Retropolitan past what could've been a nostalgia trip in lesser hands. That shouldn't come as a surprise, however, when the beats come from a studio legend that has remained at the top of his game, and the lyrics come from an aficionado of the old school with one of the moment's freshest flows." Riley Wallace of HipHopDX gave this album 4.4 out of 5, calling it "a sunny walk down memory lane." It also adds "it feels like a modern take. It gives a retrospective context (and sonic second life) to the culture of old New York in an accessible way that doesn’t make anyone feel left out."

== Track listing ==
All tracks produced by Pete Rock.
No.	Title	Length
1.	"Men Like Us (Intro)"	0:44
2.	"Glorious"	4:18
3.	"Truck Jewels" (featuring Pete Rock)	3:25
4.	"Carry the Tradition" (featuring Styles P)	4:28
5.	"Homegrown"	3:25
6.	"It's All Good"	4:29
7.	"Ten Days"	3:19
8.	"Richie"	4:33
9.	"Penny Jerseys"	4:36
10.	"One Time" (featuring Raheem DeVaughn)	3:52
11.	"Eastern Conference All-Stars" (featuring Benny the Butcher, Conway the Machine, Elzhi and Westside Gunn)	5:55
12.	"The Audacity of Dope"	4:03
Total length:		46:26

== Charts ==
Chart (2019)	Peak position
US Independent Albums (Billboard)	26

== Credits ==
From the CD :

- David Kutch – Mastering
- Pete Rock – Producer
- Jamie Staub – mixing
- Lorenzo "Captive" Rosado, Renegade El Rey and Almightyrioo – Recording
- Kick James, Sen Floyd – Photography
- Emmanuel Everett – Illustration
- Jean Goode – Graphic Design, Layout
- Michael Tolle, Skyler Taylor – Executive producer
