= Soul Survivor (Pete Rock album) =

Studio album by Pete Rock
- Released: November 10, 1998
- Recorded: 1996–1998
- Genres: East Coast hip hop; jazz rap
- Length: 74:14
- Labels: Loud; RCA; BMG 07863-67616
- Producers: Pete Rock; Grap Luva

Pete Rock chronology
The Main Ingredient (1994)	Soul Survivor (1998)	PeteStrumentals (2001)

Singles from Soul Survivor
- 1. "Tru Master" Released: 1998; 2. "Take Your Time" Released: 1999

Professional ratings
Review scores
Source	Rating
AllMusic	3/5 stars
Encyclopedia of Popular Music	4/5 stars
Los Angeles Times	3.5/4 stars
The New Rolling Stone Album Guide	3/5 stars
RapReviews	9/10
The Source	3.5/5 stars
XXL	XL (4/5)

Soul Survivor is the debut studio album of hip hop producer and emcee Pete Rock, formerly of the acclaimed duo Pete Rock & CL Smooth. It was released on November 10, 1998. Pete contributes to all the production on the release, as well as a number of verses, while leaving a large part of the rhyming to several guest artists; such as, Kurupt of Tha Dogg Pound, Wu-Tang Clan members Raekwon, Inspectah Deck, Ghostface Killah, Method Man, & Cappadonna, O.C., Black Thought of The Roots, Rob-O, formerly of the group InI, Prodigy of Mobb Deep, Lord Tariq & Peter Gunz, Large Professor, Kool G Rap, MC Eiht, Jane Eugene & Loose Ends, Vinia Mojica, Miss Jones, Heavy D, Beenie Man, Sticky Fingaz of Onyx, Common, Big Punisher, Noreaga, and former partner C.L. Smooth.

== Track listing ==
- All tracks produced by Pete Rock, except track 3 produced by Grap Luva

#	Title	Performer(s)
1	"Soul Survivor Intro"	Pete Rock
2	"Tru Master"	First verse: Inspectah Deck; Hook/second verse: Pete Rock; Third verse: Kurupt
3	"Half Man, Half Amazin'"	First & fourth verses: Pete Rock; Second & third verses: Method Man
4	"Respect Mine"	First & third verses: O.C.; Hook/second & fourth verses: Pete Rock
5	"Tha Game"	First verse/hook: Raekwon; Second verse: Prodigy; Third verse: Ghostface Killah; Fourth verse: Pete Rock
6	"#1 Soul Brother"	Pete Rock
7	"Rock Steady Part II"	First verse: Peter Gunz; Second verse: Lord Tariq; Third verse/hook: Pete Rock
8	"Truly Yours ’98"	First verse: Large Professor; Second verse: Pete Rock; Third verse: Kool G Rap
9	"It's About That Time"	First verse/hook: Black Thought; Second verse: Rob-O; Third verse: Pete Rock
10	"One Life To Live"	First & third verses/hook: MC Eiht; Second verse/outro: Pete Rock
11	"Take Your Time"	Intro/second & fourth verses: Pete Rock; First & third verses: Jane Eugene of Loose Ends; Hook: Loose Ends; Outro: Loose Ends & Pete Rock
12	"Mind Blowin'"	Verses: Pete Rock; Hook: Vinia Mojica
13	"Soul Survivor"	Verses: Pete Rock; Hook/outro: Miss Jones
14	"Da Two"	First & third verses: C.L. Smooth; Hook/second verse: Pete Rock
15	"Verbal Murder 2"	First verse: Big Pun; Hook/outro: Pete Rock; Second verse: Noreaga; Third verse: Common
16	"Strange Fruit"	First verse: Tragedy Khadafi; Hook: Tragedy Khadafi & Pete Rock; Second verse: Cappadonna; Third verse: Sticky Fingaz
17	"Massive (Hold Tight)"	Intro/first & third verses: Heavy D; Hook/second verse: Beenie Man; Outro: Heavy D & Beenie Man

== Documentary ==
A documentary was released around the time of the album, which featured the recording sessions of some of the tracks.

== Singles ==
Single information
"Tru Master"
- Released: 1998
- B-side:
"Take Your Time"
- Released: 1999
- B-side: "Tha Game"

== Chart positions ==
=== Album ===
Chart (1998)	Peak position
US Billboard 200	39
US Top R&B/Hip-Hop Albums (Billboard)	9

=== Singles ===
Year	Song	Hot R&B/Hip-Hop Singles & Tracks	Hot Rap Singles
1998	"Tru Master"	68	40
1999	"Take Your Time"	80	18
