= YG'z =

YGz
- YG'z members

Background information
- Origin: Mount Vernon, New York, U.S.
- Genres: East Coast hip hop
- Years active: 1993
- Label: Reprise/Warner Bros. Records

The YG'z was an American East Coast hip hop group that recorded the EP Street Nigga in 1993.

Four out of the six songs on Street Nigga were produced by Pete Rock, who took the group under his wing and helped them get a record deal with Reprise/Warner Bros. Records, a sister label of Elektra Records within the WEA family, to which Pete Rock was signed.

The group was a featured guest on the song "Death Becomes You" by the hip-hop duo Pete Rock & C.L. Smooth on the Menace II Society original soundtrack.

== Discography ==
- Street Nigga (1993)

"'Street Nigga,' the six-song EP by YG'z, is more of the same, hold the R&B and the few drops of creativity the D.R.S. do have. This album is a must for anyone who is collecting gangsta rap albums, particularly by artists who swear they're "for real," for an anthology. Or anyone who has the same phallic gangsta obsession with guns."
