= Don't Smoke Rock =

Studio album by Smoke DZA & Pete Rock
- Released: December 2, 2016
- Recorded: 2016
- Genre: Hip hop
- Length: 49:33
- Label: Babygrande
- Producer: Pete Rock

Pete Rock chronology
PeteStrumentals 2 (2015)	Don't Smoke Rock (2016)	Lost Sessions (2017)

Smoke DZA chronology
He Has Risen (2016)	Don't Smoke Rock (2016)

Professional ratings
Review scores
Source	Rating
AllMusic	4/5 stars

Don't Smoke Rock is the first collaborative studio album by rapper Smoke DZA and producer Pete Rock. It was released on December 2, 2016, by Babygrande Records, Sony Music and The Orchard. The album features guest appearances from Dave East, Rick Ross, Royce da 5'9", Cam'ron, NymLo, BJ the Chicago Kid, Jadakiss, Styles P, Wale, Big K.R.I.T., Dom Kennedy, theMIND and Mac Miller.

== Critical reception ==
Bringing a taste of the Golden Age into 2016, Pete Rock and Smoke DZA remind listeners that solid production and thoughtful, socially relevant rhymes are timeless on their collaborative effort, Don't Smoke Rock. Employing his trademark sample style, the legendary Rock weaves jazz and soul snippets throughout each track, as DZA and a stacked roster of guests take turns with bars reminiscent of the '90s, a time when there was more to mainstream hip-hop than mumbling. The results are refreshing, nostalgic, and extremely satisfying for fans of that period. Released in the same year that saw the return of De La Soul, The LOX and A Tribe Called Quest, Don't Smoke Rock serves as another link between eras: paying respects to old-school hip-hop legacy with updated perspectives and production quality. In case their intent was unclear, DZA even introduces the LP reminiscing about a pre-gentrification "old Harlem" on "Intro" and later pining for the good old days on the creeping Cam'Ron & Nymlo track "Moving Weight, Pt. 1." Rock's samples range from dramatic strings ("Wild 100s"), haunting hypnotic loops (the monstrous Wale track "Show Off"), and booming horns (the Dave East joint "Limitless") to inspired comedic bits from Bernie Mac ("I Ain't Scared") and Chris Tucker ("Until Then"). Highlights are numerous. On "Black Superhero Car", DZA and Rick Ross trade verses over a throwback sample that sounds like early-era Pete Rock-disciple Kanye West. Royce Da 5'9" contributes to the plaintive, aptly titled piano-looper "Hold The Drums", and an all-star cast of BJ The Chicago Kid, Jadakiss, and Styles P descend upon "Milestone". The 13-track time machine does not relent or disappoint, making Don't Smoke Rock a standout for hip-hop fans in need of quality nourishment.

== Track listing ==
All tracks produced by Pete Rock

No.	Title	Writer(s)	Length
1.	"Intro"	Peter Phillips; Sean Pompey	1:16
2.	"Limitless" (featuring Dave East)	Phillips; Pompey; Dave Brewster	4:23
3.	"Black Superhero Car" (featuring Rick Ross)	Phillips; Pompey; William Roberts II	3:32
4.	"Hold the Drums" (featuring Royce da 5'9")	Phillips; Pompey; Ryan Montgomery	5:16
5.	"Moving Weight, Pt. 1" (featuring Cam'ron and NymLo)	Phillips; Pompey; Cameron Giles	5:07
6.	"Wild 100s"	Phillips; Pompey	3:38
7.	"Last Name"	Phillips; Pompey	3:52
8.	"1 of 1"	Phillips; Pompey	2:17
9.	"Milestone" (featuring BJ the Chicago Kid, Jadakiss, and Styles P)	Phillips; Pompey; Bryan Sledge; David Styles; Jason Phillips	4:19
10.	"Show Off" (featuring Wale)	Phillips; Pompey; Olubowale Akintimehin	4:05
11.	"Dusk 2 Dusk" (featuring Big K.R.I.T., Dom Kennedy, and theMIND)	Phillips; Pompey; Dominic Hunn; Justin Scott; Zarif Wilder	4:15
12.	"I Ain't Scared"	Phillips; Pompey	1:57
13.	"Until Then" (featuring Mac Miller)	Phillips; Pompey; Malcolm McCormick	5:29
Total length:			49:33

== Personnel ==
- Olubowale Akintimehin - composer
- Owen Biddle - bass
- Big K.R.I.T. - featured artist
- BJ The Chicago Kid - featured artist
- Paul Bloom - keyboards
- Dave Brewster - composer
- Cam'Ron - featured artist
- Shonka Dukurah - vocals
- Alan M. Duval - photography
- Dave East - featured artist
- Jeremy Gerson - product manager
- Dan "The Man" Humiston - mixing
- Jadakiss - featured artist
- Daru Jones - drums, music direction
- Dom Kennedy - featured artist
- Marcus Machado - guitar
- Malcolm McCormick - composer, featured artist
- Raul Montgomery - composer
- John Spark Moriau - mastering
- Eileen Moudou - violin
- Brandon Newsome - percussion, vocals
- Nymlo - featured artist
- Pete Phillips - composer, executive producer, primary artist, producer
- Marion "OJ" Ross - horn
- Rick Ross - composer, featured artist
- Royce Da 5'9" - featured artist
- TaVon Sampson - artwork
- Randy Singleton - photography
- Smoke DZA - executive producer, primary artist
- Styles P - featured artist
- theMIND - featured artist
- Aristotle Torres - art direction
- Wale - featured artist
- Preston West - A&R
- Chuck Wilson - Executive Producer
