= Barely Breaking Even =

British record label

BBE Records (Barely Breaking Even)
- Founded: 1996
- Founder: Pete Adarkwah, Ben Jolly
- Status: Active
- Distributor: Studio !K7
- Genre: Hip hop, neo-soul, breakbeat, electronic
- Country of origin: United Kingdom
- Location: London, England
- Official website: bbemusic.com

Barely Breaking Even (BBE) is a British record label started by two DJs, Peter Adarkwah and Ben Jolly. The name BBE comes from The Universal Robot Band's 1982 track "Barely Breaking Even". It has two sublabels: Deep Funk, and Urban Theory. BBE released the Beat Generation series of LPs.

== Current/former artists ==
- Audrey Powne
- BlackCoffee
- Bombay Monkey
- Dark Room Notes
- J Dilla (deceased)
- DJ Jazzy Jeff
- George Pajon
- Keb Darge
- Keith Harris
- Kenny 'Dope' Gonzales
- Lady Daisey
- Little Louie Vega
- Masters at Work
- Mike City
- Mr Thing
- Pete Rock
- Phantogram
- Printz Board
- Rim Kwaku Obeng
- Roy Ayers
- Shawn Lee
- Slakah the Beatchild
- DJ Spinna
- Spoek Mathambo
- TY (deceased)
- DJ Vadim
- Paul Weller
- will.i.am

== Discography ==
=== Albums ===
- 1999: Keb Darge – Funk Spectrum: Real Funk for Real People
- 2003: Pete Rock – Lost & Found: Hip Hop Underground Soul Classics
- 2004: The Foreign Exchange – Connected
- 2004: Pete Rock – Soul Survivor II
- 2005: Ski Oakenfull – Rising Son
- 2005: Pete Rock – The Surviving Elements: From Soul Survivor II Sessions
- 2005: D'Nell – 1st Magic
- 2005: Symbolyc One & Illmind – The Art of Onemind
- 2006: Shawn Lee – Soul Visa
- 2006: Nicolay – Here
- 2009: Notes to Self – A Shot in the Dark
- 2010: Ty – Special Kind of Fool
- 2010: Bara Bröst – Elephancycle
- 2010: Spoek Mathambo – Mshini Wam
- 2012: Newban – Newban and Newban 2
- 2014: Shawn Lee – Golden Age Against the Machine
- 2015: Dalindèo – Kallio
- 2016: Dalindèo – Slavic Souls
- 2017: Mike City – The Feel Good Agenda, Vol. 1
- 2021: Billy Bang – Lucky Man: Music from the Film
- 2024: Audrey Powne – From the Fire

=== Beat Generation series ===
- 2001: J Dilla – Welcome 2 Detroit
- 2001: Pete Rock – Petestrumentals
- 2001: will.i.am – Lost Change
- 2001: Marley Marl – Re–Entry
- 2002: DJ Jazzy Jeff – The Magnificent
- 2002: King Britt – Adventures in Lo–Fi
- 2003: Larry Gold – Presents Don Cello and Friends
- 2003: DJ Spinna – Here to There
- 2004: The Beat Generation Sampler
- 2006: J Dilla – The Shining
- 2007: DJ Jazzy Jeff – The Return of the Magnificent
- 2008: Madlib – WLIB AM: King of the Wigflip
