= Jeremy Deputat =

American photographer and art director

- Born: Detroit, Michigan, U.S.
- Education: Wayne State University
- Occupations: Creative director, photographer
- Website: jeremydeputat.com

Jeremy "JD" Deputat is an American photographer and art director from Detroit, Michigan. He is known for portrait and music photography, including work with Eminem and Kid Rock.

== Career ==
Deputat began taking photographs while working as an art director at the Detroit alternative weekly Real Detroit Weekly. He began shooting around 2003 after encountering limitations in the photography available for the publication, and left Real Detroit Weekly in 2009 to pursue photography full time. His early photography career became closely associated with musicians including Eminem and Kid Rock. He photographed Eminem for the cover of the November 9, 2013 issue of Billboard. In 2011, Deputat accompanied Kid Rock's Born Free tour and photographed the musician on and off stage. The resulting photographs became the 2013 book I'm Kid Rock, What's Your Excuse?, a 176-page collection documenting the tour.

In July 2014, Deputat presented his first solo exhibition, Nothing Is Forever, at Inner State Gallery in Detroit's Eastern Market. The exhibition combined portraits of musicians with travel photography. In 2017, Deputat contributed photography to Artifacts, a project examining Detroit music history through objects associated with the city's musical culture. That November, Deputat and photographer Jason Peterson led a Music + Photo Master Class as part of Red Bull Sound Select's 30 Days in Chicago.
