= Lost & Found: Hip Hop Underground Soul Classics =

Compilation album by Pete Rock
- Released: October 27, 2003
- Recorded: 1995–96, 2000
- Studio: Greene Street Studios in New York City, NY
- Genre: Hip hop
- Length: 67:56 (Center of Attention); 57:53 (The Original Baby Pa)
- Label: BBE; Rapster
- Producer: Pete Rock; Grap Luva; Spunk Bigga

Pete Rock chronology
PeteStrumentals (2001)	Lost & Found: Hip Hop Underground Soul Classics (2003)	Soul Survivor II (2004)

Professional ratings
Review scores
Source	Rating
AllMusic	3/5 stars
HipHopDX	4/5
Pitchfork Media	8.2/10
RapReviews	8.5/10

Lost & Found: Hip Hop Underground Soul Classics is a double-disc album containing two previously shelved albums Center of Attention, by InI, and The Original Baby Pa, by Deda. Released on October 27, 2003 on BBE Records. Both albums were recorded in 1995 and produced entirely by Pete Rock, except for five overall tracks produced either by Grap Luva or Spunk Bigga. Neither album had been officially released until this compilation came out.

== Background ==
Both albums were recorded in 1995, and were scheduled to be released through Pete Rock's Soul Brother Records label via a distribution deal with Elektra Records. The InI single "Fakin' Jax" was released in that year and performed fairly well. Deda's song "Blah Uno" originally appeared on a live compilation released by Elektra, which also gave a catalog number for the album that was then to be called Every Man For Himself. Pete Rock's distribution deal with Elektra fell through, and plans to release the albums were subsequently cancelled because of issues over ownership of the masters. The Life I Live did, however, find its way onto the underground market through bootlegging.

== Critical reception ==
In its review, PopMatters wrote that "Pete Rock has no peer when it comes to the seamless graft and the spare pull of tightly cut samples with beats that boom through the basement of your speakers." The A.V. Club wrote that the compilation "affords the pleasure of listening to a production master operating at his creative apex."

Complex called Center of Attention "a lost rap classic."

== INI Center of Attention ==
#	Title	Performer (s)
1	"Intro"	*Instrumental*
2	"No More Words"	Grap Luva, Ras G, Rob-O
3	"Step Up"	Rob-O, Grap Luva, Ras G
4	"Think Twice"	Grap Luva, Pete Rock, Rob-O
5	"Square One"	Grap Luva, Ras G, Rob-O
6	"The Life I Live"	Grap Luva, Ras G, Rob-O
7	"Kross Roads"	Rob-O, Pete Rock
8	"To Each His Own"	Grap Luva, Q-Tip, Rob-O, Large Professor
9	"Fakin Jax'"	Pete Rock, Rob-O, Ras G, Grap Luva
10	"What You Say"	Marco Polo, Grap Luva, Ras G, Rob-O
11	"Props"	Rob-O
12	"Center of Attention"	Ras G, Rob-O, Grap Luva
13	"Grown Man Sport"	Ras G, Grap Luva, Rob-O, Meccalicious, Marco Polo
14	"Mind Over Matter"	Grap Luva, Rob-O, Ras G
15	"Don't You Love It"	Rob-O
16	"Microphonist Wanderlust"	Rob-O, Denise Weeks

== Deda The Original Baby Pa ==
#	Title	Performer (s)
1	"Everyman"	Deda, Pete Rock
2	"Baby Pa"	Deda
3	"How I'm Livin'"	Deda, Vinia Mojica
4	"Blah Uno"	Deda
5	"Can't Wait"	Deda
6	"I Originate"	Deda
7	"Markd4Death"	Ex Cons
8	"Nasty Scene"	Deda
9	"Nothing More"	Deda
10	"Press Rewind"	Deda, Pete Rock
11	"Rhyme Writer"	Deda
12	"Too Close"	Deda
13	"Understand?"	Deda
*	Bonus Track (Demo): "Anything Goes"	Deda
