= Pete Rock =

American record producer (born 1970)

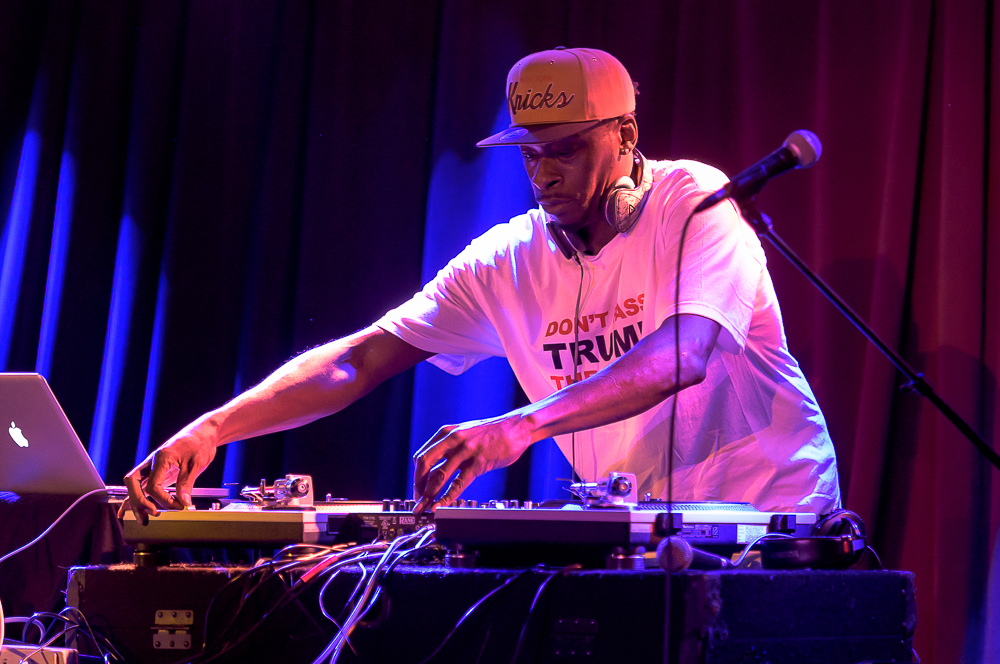
- Rock performing at Rahzel and Friends, Brooklyn Bowl, 2016

Background information
- Also known as: Soul Brother No. 1; The Chocolate Boy Wonder
- Born: Peter O. Phillips; June 21, 1970 (age 56); The Bronx, New York City, U.S.
- Origin: Mount Vernon, New York, U.S.
- Genres: East Coast hip hop; alternative hip hop; experimental hip hop; jazz rap; turntablism
- Occupations: Record producer; DJ; rapper
- Works: Production discography
- Years active: 1987–present
- Labels: Babygrande; Elektra; Loud; Rapster; BBE; Nature Sounds; Mello; Tru Soul; Soul Brother #1 Productions
- Formerly of: Pete Rock & CL Smooth

Peter O. Phillips (born June 21, 1970), better known by his stage name Pete Rock, is an American record producer, DJ and rapper. He is widely recognized as one of the greatest hip hop producers of all time, and is often mentioned alongside DJ Premier, RZA, and Q-Tip as one of the mainstays of 1990s East Coast hip-hop production. He rose to prominence in the early 1990s as one half of the critically acclaimed group Pete Rock & CL Smooth. Early on in his career, he was also famed for his remix work.

After the duo went their separate ways, Rock continued with a solo career that has garnered him worldwide respect, though little in the way of mainstream success. Along with groups such as Stetsasonic, Gang Starr, A Tribe Called Quest and The Roots, Rock played a major role in the merging of elements from jazz into hip hop music (also known as jazz rap). Pete Rock is also the older brother and younger cousin, respectively, of rappers Grap Luva and Heavy D.

== Biography ==
=== Early life ===
Peter Phillips was born in The Bronx in New York City the fourth of five children born to Jamaican immigrant parents, Leighton Phillips and Eda Phillips . His family moved to Mount Vernon, New York when he was seven years old. Around the time, his parents would take him and his younger brother (Grap Luva) to see James Brown at a concert in his neighborhood to where performers such as Marva Whitney, Lyn Collins, The JB's would come perform and do shows and acts in front of the audience. He would meet James Brown backstage after a show for a meet and greet. Rock started scratching at the age 7 when one of his parents brought him home a toy record player by Fisher-Price. He began scratching after his first cousin, Floyd Myers, the older brother of Heavy D, taught Rock how to DJ. When Rock was 17, he learned how to make beats with the E-mu SP-1200 that Freddie Foxx gave him. Rock attended Mount Vernon High School.

During high school, he met his future recording partner CL Smooth. He briefly attended John Jay College of Criminal Justice but was not a serious student and left to focus on his music career. According to Phillips, his father was also a part-time DJ who had an impressive record collection. Rock would often accompany his father to a cricket club called Wembley in The Bronx and watch as he spun records for the guests. His first job was as a paperboy, in his neighborhood. His first major exposure to the hip hop audience was in the late 80s with Marley Marl as a DJ on New York's WBLS radio show "In Control With Marley Marl" at the age of 13. According to Rock, he stated he met Marley Marl through his cousin Heavy D, after one of Marley's Disc jockey got injured in a car accident and needed a backup DJ on WBLS radio show "In Control With Marley Marl". Propelled by the growth of his popularity, he began producing in the early 90s.

== Solo career ==
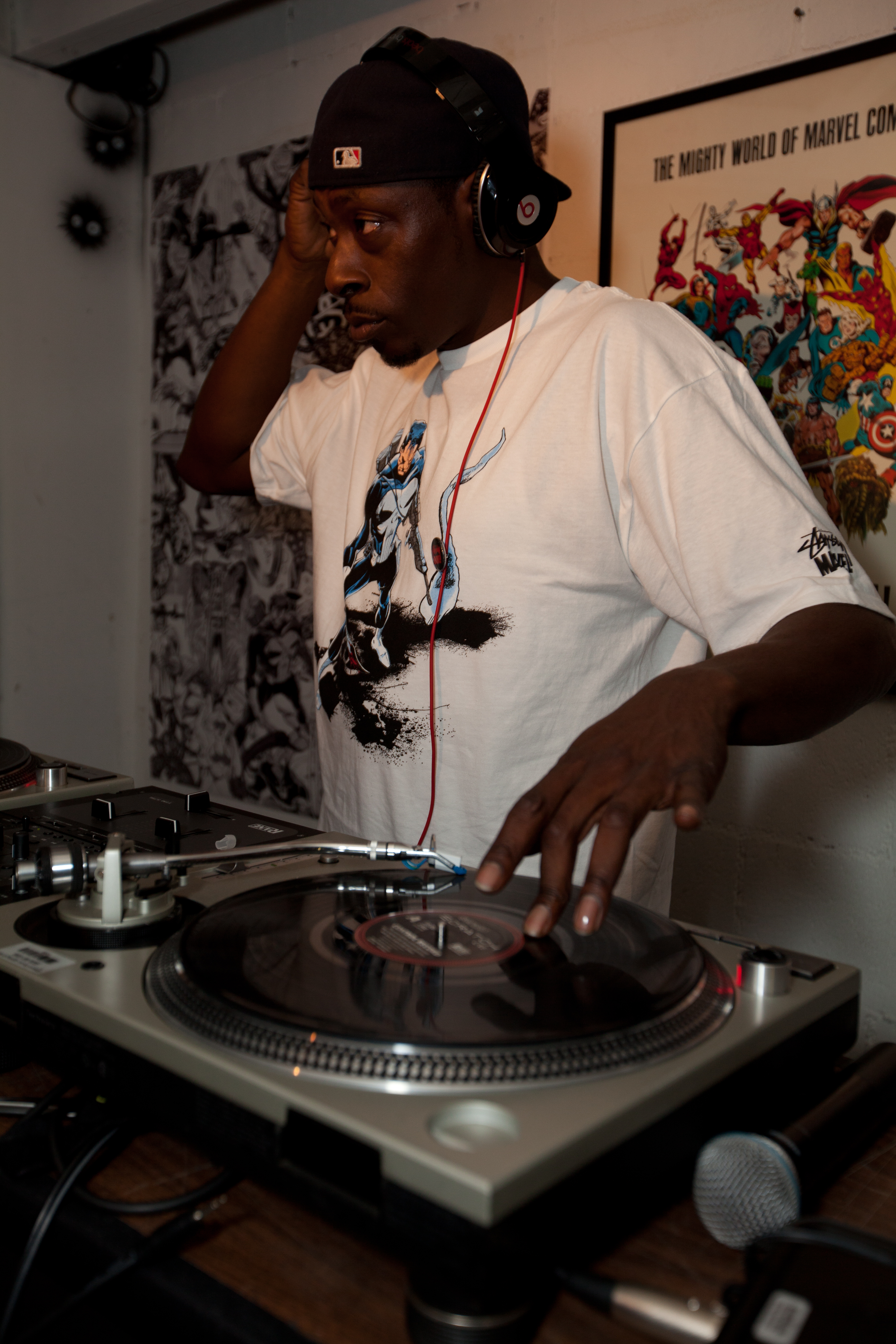
Pete Rock performing at Marvel/Stüssy launch party in Los Angeles, 2011

After the breakup with CL Smooth in 1995, Rock continued working, remixing and producing for artists. He would be on Future Flavas with Marley Marl on Hot 97, which debuted in January 1995. In 1996, he produced a song called "The Rap World", which Rock would rap alongside Large Professor on High School High soundtrack. He made other guest appearances on albums, including Diamond D's 1997's Hatred, Passions and Infidelity LP, the song called "Painz & Strife" featuring Phife Dawg of A Tribe Called Quest. Rock released his first solo debut album, Soul Survivor on November 10, 1998, on Loud Records. The album would feature hit singles, "Tru Master" featuring Inspectah Deck and Kurupt, and "Take Your Time" featuring R&B group Loose Ends. In the early year of 2000, he worked out a deal with BBE, a label based in the UK and released PeteStrumentals, an instrumental album that features no vocals, excerpt for tracks 'Cake" and "Nothin' Lesser" which performed by the UN (Divine, Godfree, Laku and Roc Marciano), a group that Rock brought in. The second version of PeteStrumentals for the Beat Generation series would be updated with new tracks after the release of J Dilla's Welcome 2 Detroit album in 2001.

In 2003, Rock would also release a compilation album, Lost & Found: Hip Hop Underground Soul Classics on October 27, 2003, on BBE records. The album contains a double disc package that feature two albums that were recorded in 1995–96 and shelved by the label Elektra Records. He went on to release more albums under BBE, including his third album Soul Survivor II on May 11, 2004 and his second instrumental album, The Surviving Elements: From Soul Survivor II Sessions on January 31, 2005 Rock would collaborate with Boston rapper Ed O.G. on a project called My Own Worst Enemy in 2004, by produced entirely by Rock, with additional production by Diamond D, DJ Revolution and DJ Supreme One. In 2006, after Rock parted ways with BBE, Rock signed with Nature Sounds for his fourth album, NY's Finest on February 26, 2008.

Rock oversaw the production of Jay Stay Paid, a posthumous album by the producer J Dilla, released June 2, 2009, on Nature Sounds. Following that, Pete Rock joined Kanye West in Hawaii, who traveled there to work on the latter's fifth album, My Beautiful Dark Twisted Fantasy. In addition, he and DJ Premier have announced that they are working on a joint album together, although further details are unknown. In London, he confirmed that Big Pooh and C.L. Smooth will be on his half of the VS album and he planned on releasing five albums in 2011, including reuniting with C.L. Smooth for a third album, and dropping his fourth album on Nature Sounds. His next few collaborative albums are both due for a summer release with Monumental first then with Camp Lo's "80 Blocks From Tiffanys" LP.

In an April 2011 interview on Conspiracy Worldwide Radio, Pete Rock discussed his new solo work including his album with DJ Premier, as well as exploring the fact that he has had numerous beats rejected by Eminem over the years Pete Rock Uncensored Radio Interview. In an August 2011 interview, he has confirmed the completion of the Camp Lo album "80 Blocks from Tiffany's" and that he is currently working on production for Torae's album, Elzhi & his own solo album PeteStrumentals 2.

Pete Rock announced on Twitter that PeteStrumentals 2 is indeed confirmed finished and scheduled for a 2015 release. The project was released on June 23, 2015, on the indie label Mello Music Group.

On January 2, 2019, Rock posted a trailer video on his Instagram page announcing that new works will be coming soon, including Return of the SP1200 (which was released on April 13, 2019, exclusively on vinyl (Record Store Day) and released digitally on April 26, 2019), PeteStrumentals 3 (a continuation to 2001's PeteStrumentals and 2015's 2), Don't Smoke Rock 2 (also a continuation to Don't Smoke Rock) featuring Smoke DZA, and an album with rapper Skyzoo. Rock confirms to Okayplayer that he is working on his sixth instrumental album called PeteStrumentals 4, another continuation to Rock's previous PeteStrumentals series releases.

The project was finished on June 30 and it is scheduled for a 2022 release on Tru Soul records. The project was released on March 31, 2022. In 2024, Rock collaborated with rapper Common with the release of The Auditorium, Vol. 1 which came out on July 12, featuring the first hit single, "Wise Up".

== Affiliates ==
=== Proteges ===
Through the years, Rock has helped to jump-start the careers of several artists. His first project outside of Pete Rock & CL Smooth was the hardcore duo YG'z, who released an EP called Street Nigga in 1993, with four out of the six tracks produced by Rock; however, they were quickly dropped from their deal with Reprise Records. His next venture, INI, was a group featuring Rock, his younger brother Grap Luva, Ras G and rapper Rob-O. They released a single, "Fakin' Jax", through Elektra Records in 1995, before their debut album, Center of Attention, was shelved by the label. The other two members continue to record solo material, albeit only sporadically. In an interview Rock elaborated on the situation:

We finished the album, turned it into Elektra and they never put it out, they only put out a single. Sylvia [Rhone] really didn't cooperate, she didn't break bread with me when it came down to resolving that. It was all about her changing everything around. She wanted to change my whole sound. When she said, "You gotta make a beat like Puffy", I just knew it wasn't going to work out.

=== Relationship with CL Smooth ===
Since their split in 1995, Pete Rock's relationship with CL Smooth has been highly unpredictable. Although the pair briefly united for the reflective "Da Two" from Rock's Soul Survivor album in 1998, they avoided entertaining requests for a reunion album until 2001, when they once again teamed up for "Back on Da Block" from Rock's PeteStrumentals. In their interviews during this period, it appeared as though a new album was underway. As Rock would explain:

We've been on tour, we know every rhymer and producer in this business. We've influenced people, even people we've never met have said that we changed the face of hip-hop. So we're going to try to do some more.

The pair went on a short international tour culminating in their well-received show at London's Jazz Cafe; however, soon after this they declined to comment any further on the new album, which never materialized (although Smooth did make three separate appearances on Soul Survivor II). Eventually, Smooth would confirm rumors of a rift in an interview with AllHipHop.com, in which he appeared angry and frustrated with his former partner, saying "I didn't ask him to be a superhero" and "I'm not the problem". In an interview taken in December 2006, Rock ruled out any further collaborations with Smooth but stated that he holds no grudges against his former partner.

On June 1, 2024, on an interview with Drink Champs, Rock addresses the split between him and his partner CL Smooth:

It should never be like this. Ever. We should still be together but some things, you know, that I can't tell the whole public. But certain things happen in a partnership that just can't be ... and people won't understand. I don't want to be the only one speaking on someone who's not here, but I wish him the best in life.

== Musical style ==
=== Production ===
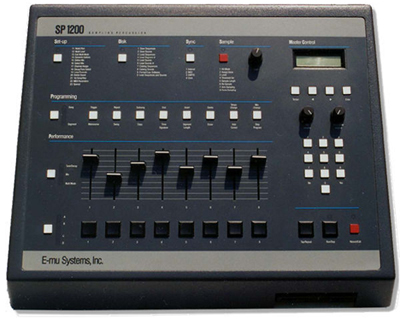
An E-mu SP-1200 that Pete Rock used to create music and beats on one of his many early recordings

Pete Rock creates beats from samples, the majority of which are taken from obscure R&B, funk, and jazz records. This paying true homage to the Black American musical traditions that are the foundation and origins of Hip-Hop music. Early on in his career he would also sample drum breaks such as Black Heat's "Zimba Ku" for Heavy D & The Boyz's "Letter To The Future". Pete Rock heavily used the E-mu SP-1200 as well as the Akai S950—later moving onto using the MPC—for his productions. Pete Rock tends to use the samples as palettes for his beats, chopping (cutting the sample into smaller parts), filtering (altering the frequencies of the sample), and layering several samples, often within the same song. While this technique was applied long before Rock (on De La Soul's Three Feet High and Rising or the work of The Bomb Squad for example), Rock's work is distinctive for the way in which he uses samples to achieve a hazy, droning effect. He is also noted for his resonant basslines, horn samples, and gritty sounding drums. His beats often sound as though they were being played from an old vinyl record; he samples many of his sounds straight off these records. He frequently recorded at Greene St. Recording in Manhattan, having liked the equalizer that was used there, which gave many of his productions a wah-wah effect.

Another trait of his, more so in the earlier part of his career, is the way he uses horn samples to supplement his grooves. On "They Reminisce Over You (T.R.O.Y.)", Rock uses a horn sample from Tom Scott's "Today"; he has also used horns on "Straighten It Out", Public Enemy's "Shut 'Em Down", Rah Digga's "What They Call Me", and A.D.O.R.'s "Let It All Hang Out".

Along with Gang Starr, The Roots and A Tribe Called Quest, Pete Rock played a large role in the fusing of jazz and funk music into hip hop. The aforementioned "Reminisce..." withstanding, Rock used many jazz samples on his album Mecca and The Soul Brother, such as Cannonball Adderley's "Country Preacher", for the song "Return of the Mecca", or "Capricorn" for the song "In the House" from The Main Ingredient. Pete Rock's heavy use of intro and outro beats has also been widely influential. To introduce feature songs, he often plays a short instrumental excerpt, completely different from the rest of the song. Aside from their role as transitions, these are widely regarded as a way of displaying his large collection and as a challenge to other hip-hop producers to identify the records that the breaks come from. Mecca & the Soul Brother and The Main Ingredient use intro/outro beats on nearly every track to great effect, and the tradition continues to the present on Rock's recent releases.

=== Remixes ===
"Another Pete Rock Remix" is Pete Rock's trademark catchphrase, heard on countless singles that he has remixed. In addition to hip-hop artists he has done remix work for artists from other genres such as his 1995 remix of "Before You Walk Out Of My Life" for R&B singer Monica. In 1992 he collaborated with Mary J. Blige on the What's the 411? single "Reminisce", which used the same sample from his own single "They Reminisce Over You (T.R.O.Y.)". Rock claims to have done several high-profile remixes that remain unreleased, including one of Madonna's "Secret". He also claims to have produced the original beat for The Notorious B.I.G.'s "Juicy" and that it was recreated by P. Diddy and Poke (of Tone & Poke fame), without consent. However, he was invited to produce the remix, which uses the same sample as the original—Mtume's "Juicy Fruit". Although he received no official producer credit, he made the original demo beat for A Tribe Called Quest's "Jazz (We've Got)", which was then recreated by Q-Tip on the album The Low End Theory. He remixed Public Enemy's "Shut 'em Down" and "Nighttrain" in the same day, starting at 12 pm and finishing at 12 am.

Up until 2003, he created all of his productions on the E-mu SP-1200, thereafter using the Akai MPC2000XL. He also has a collection of about 90,000 records and looks for records at least once a week. Pete Rock was one of nine artists who participated in thetruth.com's Remix Project, where he remixed the Sunny Side song "Magical Amount".

=== Influence ===
Pete Rock himself being overwhelmingly influenced by Black American musical traditions of Soul, Jazz, and R&B music, was able to pay it forward. Pete Rock has had a considerable impact on a number of record producers who have emerged in the hip hop scene since the late 1990s. Critics have favorably compared Detroit producer J Dilla and North Carolina's 9th Wonder to Rock; both of them worked with Rock during their recording careers. Several of the comparisons stem from the fact that these producers have created the bulk of their productions out of samples, as well as the warm, mellow, and exuberant undertones apparent in their work. Pete Rock himself has added validation to the comparisons with J Dilla by stating "he's the only producer in this game that was just as serious [as me]."

== Personal life ==
Rock is an avid Marvel fan. He enjoys reading and collecting comic books of his favorite superhero characters, such as The Incredible Hulk, Spider-Man, and X-Men. Rock is also a fan of the NFL football team New York Giants and the NBA basketball team New York Knicks.

== Legacy ==
A publisher from TV One called Pete Rock "the most visionary and renowned producers in Hip Hop history". Rock is viewed as one of the most prolific, influential, and respected hip-hop producers of all-time. A writer from Yellow Brick, called Pete Rock's music "a unique sound, which blends jazz and soul samples with hard-hitting drums, has inspired countless producers and helped shape the sound of hip hop."

== Discography ==
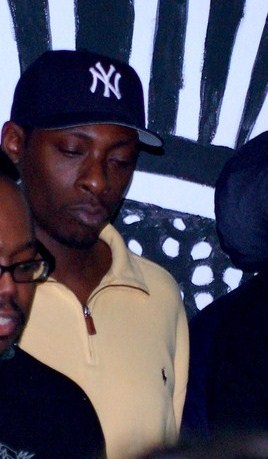
Pete Rock in 2007

Studio albums

- Soul Survivor (1998)
- Soul Survivor II (2004)
- NY's Finest (2008)
- Soul Survivor 3 (TBA)

Collaboration albums

- Mecca and the Soul Brother (with CL Smooth) (1992)
- The Main Ingredient (with CL Smooth) (1994)
- My Own Worst Enemy (with Ed O.G.) (2004)
- 80 Blocks from Tiffany's (with Camp Lo) (2011)
- Monumental (with Smif-N-Wessun) (2011)
- 80 Blocks from Tiffany's 2 (with Camp Lo) (2013, re-released in 2020)
- Don't Smoke Rock (with Smoke DZA) (2016)
- Retropolitan (with Skyzoo) (2019)
- 21 Grams: Worth It's [sic] Weight in Soul (with AMXXR) (2021)
- The Auditorium Vol. 1 (with Common) (2024)

Collaboration EPs

- All Souled Out (with CL Smooth) (1991)
- The Basement Demos (with CL Smooth) (2009)
- C (with Canibus) (2022)
- Baby Boy Beat Tape (with Bleq Saevan) (2023)

Instrumental albums

- PeteStrumentals (2001)
- The Surviving Elements: From Soul Survivor II Sessions (2005)
- PeteStrumentals 2 (2015)
- Lost Sessions (2017)
- Return of the SP1200 (2019)
- PeteStrumentals 3 (with the Soul Brothers) (2020)
- PeteStrumentals 4 (2022)
- Return of the SP1200 Vol. 2 (2022)

Compilation albums

- Pete's Treats (1999)
- Good Life: The Best of Pete Rock & CL Smooth (with CL Smooth) (2003)
- Lost & Found: Hip Hop Underground Soul Classics (2003)

=== Vocal Guest Appearances ===
Title	Year	Artist(s)	Album
Jump Around (Remix)	1992	House of Pain	House of Pain
Fakin' Jax	1996	INI	Center of Attention
The Yearn	1996	Lost Boyz	America Is Dying Slowly/ Legal Drug Money
Rap World	1996	Large Professor	High School High (soundtrack)
Painz & Strife	1997	Diamond, Phife Dawg	Hatred, Passions and Infidelity
Once Upon a Time	2000	Slum Village	Fan-Tas-Tic (Vol. 1)
Lemme Find Out	2000	Phife Dawg	Ventilation: Da LP
Situations	2000	Edo G	The Truth Hurts
Open	2001	Da Beatminerz, Caron Wheeler	Brace 4 Impak
Dedicated	2002	Heather B	Eternal Affairs
Out da Box	2004	Tony Touch, Masta Ace, Large Professor	The Piece Maker 2
Vitamins	2013	N.O.R.E.	Student of the Game
Only Way 2 Go	2014	Diamond D	The Diam Piece
Memory of... (US)	2016	De La Soul, Estelle	And the Anonymous Nobody...
I Keep On	2018	Apathy, Pharoahe Monch	The Widow's Son
Piper	2018	Conway the Machine	Everybody Is F.O.O.D.
E.L.E.2 Intro	2020	Busta Rhymes, Rakim, Chris Rock	Extinction Level Event 2: The Wrath of God
Livin' and Lovin' in My Own Way	2023	Brandee Younger	Brand New Life
