= My Own Worst Enemy (album) =

Studio album by Ed O.G. & Pete Rock
- Released: November 9, 2004
- Recorded: 2003–2004
- Genre: Hip hop
- Label: Fat Beats
- Producer: Pete Rock, DJ Supreme One, Diamond D, DJ Revolution

Ed O.G. & Pete Rock chronology
Wishful Thinking (2002)	My Own Worst Enemy (2004)	Stereotypez (2007)

Professional ratings
Review scores
Source	Rating
AllMusic	3.5/5 stars
RapReviews	9/10

My Own Worst Enemy is an album by Ed O.G. and Pete Rock, released in 2004. The album's single, "Wishing", included a guest appearance from Masta Ace.

It was reissued in 2016.

== Production ==
The album consists of 10 songs, seven of them produced by Rock, with additional production from Diamond D and DJ Revolution. The guests included Jaysaun, Masta Ace, and Diamond D. The album was recorded over a period of two years, due to Rock's touring and other production responsibilities.

== Critical reception ==
PopMatters called Rock's production "always relaxed, almost stoned; the organic jazz vibe produces a mild, yet cerebral high when punctuated with his trademark horns." Remix wrote that "on 'Boston', a somber guitar loop and subtle chimes are stretched across sturdy drums for Edo to lyrically praise his hometown, and the bouncy 'Stop Dat' utilizes chopped space-age effects."

== Track listing ==
No.	Title	Producer	Length
1.	"Boston"	Pete Rock	3:24
2.	"Just Call My Name" (featuring Jaysaun)	Pete Rock	4:59
3.	"Voices"	Pete Rock	5:42
4.	"School 'Em"	Pete Rock	3:31
5.	"Streets Is Callin'" (featuring Diamond D and Jaysaun)	Diamond D	4:45
6.	"Pay The Price" (featuring Jaysaun)	Pete Rock	4:02
7.	"Wishing" (featuring Masta Ace)	DJ Supreme One	3:52
8.	"Right Now!" (featuring Pete Rock)	Pete Rock	5:07
9.	"Stop Dat" (featuring Krumb Snatcha and Jaysaun)	Pete Rock	4:36
10.	"Revolution"	DJ Revolution	3:58

12th Anniversary Edition (bonus tracks)
No.	Title	Producer	Length
11.	"Shed A Tear"	Pete Rock
12.	"Wishing (Original Version)" (featuring Masta Ace)	DJ Supreme One
13.	"Jus Listen"	DJ Supreme One
14.	"Pete Rock Unreleased Instrumental #1"	Pete Rock
15.	"Pete Rock Unreleased Instrumental #2"	Pete Rock
16.	"Shed A Tear (Instrumental)"	Pete Rock

== Album singles ==
Single information
"Boston"
- Released: 2004
- B-side: "Stop Dat"
