= InI (hip-hop group) =

American hip hop group

Background information
- Origin: Mount Vernon, New York, U.S.
- Genres: East Coast hip hop
- Years active: 1990–1997
- Label: Elektra
- Members: Rob-O; Grap Luva; I Love H.I.M. (formerly Ras G); Marco Polo; DJ Boodakhan

InI was an American hip hop group that formed in 1990 and broke up in 1997. The group was composed of members Rob-O, Grap Luva, I Love H.I.M. (formerly known as Ras G), Marco Polo (now known as Jolomite), and DJ Boodakhan.

== History ==
=== The Life I Live and disputes with Elektra Records ===
The group started working on their debut album, with the working title The Life I Live, together with producer Pete Rock in the mid-1990s. They signed a deal with his newfound imprint Soul Brother Records through Elektra. Despite the fact that Pete Rock was not an official member of the group, it became synonymous with his name. He produced almost every track on Center of Attention, and his younger brother Grap Luva formed a crucial part of the group. Pete Rock had two guest verses in the album on tracks "Fakin Jax" and "Think Twice", with additional ad-libs and background vocals on almost every track.

In 1996, the lead single from their album, Fakin' Jax saw release and became an underground hit. Unbeknownst at the time, this single ultimately ended up being the group's only release on the label. Pete Rock later revealed that management shifts were to blame for the album changing title from The Life I Live to Center of Attention before eventually being shelved:

“When I finished the InI album, there was a guy who was the president who approved of InI and got them signed to Elektra... But once Sylvia Rhone came into the picture things didn’t work out between me and her. We didn’t have the greatest relationship. She came in with some of her own insights, which I didn’t approve of, and I felt she didn’t understand real Hip-Hop music. She came in with the brand new polished sound, which was, to me, it was like water to skin. It just rolls off of you. It doesn’t stick to you… I felt like me and her, I didn’t feel like we would have a great relationship with our thought processes going in different directions.”

Following the disputes with Sylvia Rhone, Pete Rock's relationship with Elektra Records quickly turned sour, which led to his distribution deal with them ending, along with the demise of Soul Brother Records. As a result, two releases he was working on at the time (InI's Center of Attention and Deda's The Original Baby Pa) never came out due to legal complications surrounding the ownership of the masters.

=== Aftermath ===
Despite the initial lack of an official release, the album eventually became one of the most bootlegged albums in hip-hop's history. In 2003, it finally saw an official release after being included on Lost & Found: Hip Hop Underground Soul Classics, a double LP of Pete Rock's mid-1990s production work, originally canceled by Elektra Records.

In 2016, Center of Attention was made available for streaming, along with other unreleased recordings Rock had been working on at the time.

The Song "Step Up" was featured in the video game Skate It. Working with EA games, Pete Rock also has a song called "They Reminisce Over You (T.R.O.Y.)" which was featured in the video game Madden NFL 12, which was released August 30th, 2011.

InI had released a demo-tape called "Krossroads", and "Concerned", Grap Luva describes this as their earliest tapes. "Concerned" appears to be called "For Your Own Concern" although it was called "Concerned" by InI. A friend of Grap Luva from France was responsible for sharing the "Concerned" track. "The beat is sick", Grap describes. The song talks about safe sex; thus the title, to be concerned. Rob-O's verse on "To Each His Own" from InI's album was the same verse which he had used on the early tape "Concerned".

After Center of Attention got shelved, the group members went their separate ways, with only two of them staying in the music scene to pursue solo careers. Grap Luva released a few limited 12" singles in the new millennium and aspired toward achieving his true interest in being a b-boy and producer. He appeared, and produced on various albums and singles from artists such as DJ Spinna, J-Live, Pete Rock, Lone Catalysts, Kev Brown and Marley Marl. Rob-O would release many singles throughout the next decade as well as an 8-track album named "Superspectacular" through an imprint called St. Nick Entertainment. After the 2006 release of his compilation album "Rhyme Pro", Rob-O retired from the hip hop scene and joined the Mount Vernon, New York Fire Department, where he currently serves as its chief of operations after being appointed into the position in 2020.

== Discography ==
- Center of Attention (1995)
