= Lost Boyz discography =

- Studio albums: 6
- Compilation albums: 1
- Singles: 6

The discography of the Lost Boyz contains three studio albums, seven singles and one compilation album.

== Studio albums ==
List of albums, with selected chart positions
Title	Album details	Peak chart positions		Certifications
Title	Album details	US	US R&B	Certifications
Legal Drug Money	Released: June 4, 1996; Label: Uptown; Format: CD, cassette, digital download, LP	6	1	RIAA: Gold
Love, Peace & Nappiness	Released: June 17, 1997; Label: Uptown; Format: CD, cassette, digital download, LP	9	2	RIAA: Gold
LB IV Life	Released: September 28, 1999; Label: Uptown; Format: CD, cassette, digital download, LP	32	8	

== Compilation ==
Year	Album
2005	Lost Boyz Forever: Released: June 21, 2005; Label: Contango

== Singles ==
Year	Single	Chart positions			Album
Year	Single	U.S. Hot 100	U.S. R&B	U.S. Rap	Album
1995	"Lifestyles of the Rich & Shameless"	91	60	10	Legal Drug Money
1995	"Jeeps, Lex Coups, Bimaz & Benz"	67	63	11	Legal Drug Money
1996	"Renee"	33	13	3	Legal Drug Money / Don't Be a Menace to South Central While Drinking Your Juice in the Hood (soundtrack)
1996	"Music Makes Me High"	51	28	5	Legal Drug Money
1996	"Get Up"	60	31	6	Legal Drug Money
1997	"Me and My Crazy World"	52	23	5	Love, Peace & Nappiness
1997	"Love, Peace & Nappiness"	`	`	`	Love, Peace & Nappiness
1998	"What's Wrong?"	`	`	`	Love, Peace & Nappiness
1999	"Take a Hike"	`	`	`	LB IV LIFE
2010	"Haaay"	—	—	—	TBA

== Guest Shots ==
=== 1995 ===
==== Mary J. Blige - It's Going Down 12" ====
- A4. "It's Going Down Remix

==== C+C Music Factory - I'll Always Be Around 12" ====
- A3. I'll Always Be Around (Ghetto Mix)

===== Lost Boyz - Bulletproof (1996 soundtrack) =====
- 02. Plant a Seed

==== Mic Geronimo - The Natural ====
- 13. Masta I.C. (Remix)

=== 1996 ===
==== Anthony Hamilton - Nobody Else 12" ====
- A1. Nobody Else (LB Remix)

==== Horace Brown - One for the Money 12" ====
- A2. One for the Money (Buttnaked Remix)

==== SWV - You're the One 12" ====
- A1. 96 Anthem - You're the One (Allstar Remix)

===== Mona Lisa - 11-20-79 / Don't Be a Menace to South Central While Drinking Your Juice in the Hood (soundtrack) =====
- 11. Can't Be Wasting My Time

====== Various Artists - America Is Dying Slowly ======
- 02. The Yearn (w/ Pete Rock)

===== Whodini - Six =====
- 02. Runnin' Em

=== 1997 ===
==== Various Artists - Rhyme & Reason (soundtrack) ====
- 09. Niggaz Don't Want It

==== Heavy D - Waterbed Hev ====
- 03. You Can Get It

===== Various Artists - Sprung (soundtrack) =====
- 03. Group Home Family (w/ Panama P.I. & Canibus)

===== LL Cool J - Phenomenon =====
- 08. Wanna Get Paid

====== O.C. - Can't Go Wrong 12" ======
- B2. Dangerous (Sequel) [w/ Big L]

===== Frankie Cutlass - Politics & Bullshit =====
- 03. Focus (w/ M.O.P.)

==== Sprinkler - Tinted Eyes 12" ====
- A3. Tinted Eyes (Mr. Sexx Remix)

=== 1998 ===
==== Various Artists - Woo (soundtrack) ====
- 03. Bouncin'

===== Onyx - Shut 'Em Down =====
- 15. Ghetto Starz

McGruff - Destined to Be

- 04. This Is How We Do

===== Various Artists - Caught Up (soundtrack) =====
- 06. Ordinary Guy

===== Kid Capri - Soundtrack to the Streets =====
- 16. Loud & Clear

=== 1999 ===
==== A+ - Hempstead High ====
- 05. Boyz to Men (w/ Canibus)
- 03. Up Top New York

==== Bob Marley - Chant Down Babylon ====
- 06. Guiltiness
