= Easy Mo Bee production discography =

The following is a discography of production by Easy Mo Bee, an American hip hop musician and record producer.

== 1989 ==
=== Big Daddy Kane - It's a Big Daddy Thing ===
- 02. "Another Victory"
- 07. "Calling Mr. Welfare" (featuring DJ Red Alert)

== 1990 ==
=== Angela - Love Me (For Being Me) (VLS) ===
- B1. "Love Me (For Being Me) (Vocal Version)" (produced by Easy Mo Bee & Mister Cee)
- B2. "Love Me (For Being Me) (Love Club Dub)" (produced by Easy Mo Bee & Mister Cee)
- B3. "Love Me (For Being Me) (Strictly Hip House)" (produced by Easy Mo Bee & Mister Cee)

== 1991 ==
=== The Genius - Words from the Genius ===
- 02. "Phony as Ya Wanna Be"
- 03. "True Fresh M.C."
- 04. "The Genius Is Slammin'"
- 05. "Words from a Genius"
- 07. "Feel the Pain"
- 08. "Those Were the Days"
- 09. "Life of a Drug Dealer"
- 10. "Stop the Nonsense"
- 11. "Living Foul"
- 12. "Drama"

=== IAM - Tam Tam de l'Afrique (VLS) ===
- A2. "Tam Tam de l'Afrique (Easy Mo Bee Mix)"

=== J Rock - Save the Children (VLS) ===
- B1. "I Get Rek" {co-produced by Patrick Harvey}
- B2. "I Get Rek-reational" {co-produced by Patrick Harvey}

=== J Rock - Streetwize ===
- 01. "Let Me Introduce Myself" {co-produced by J Rock}

=== Nikke Nicole - Nikke Does It Better (VLS) ===
- B1. "Nikke Does It Better (Easy Does It Vocal)"

=== Nikke Nicole - Sexy! (VLS) ===
- B1. "Silky Silk"

=== Prince Rakeem - Ooh I Love You Rakeem ===
- 04. "Sexcapades (DMD Mix)" {co-produced by Prince Rakeem}
- 05. "Sexcapades (Wu-Tang Mix)" {co-produced by Prince Rakeem}

=== Rappin' Is Fundamental - The Doo-Hop Legacy ===
- 01. "Swing of Things"
- 02. "Highway to Heaven"
- 03. "Now That You Know My Name"
- 04. "Them Boys Are Getting There" (additional production by Tomie)
- 05. "You Wanna Trip"
- 06. "Speak Softly"
- 07. "Rapping Is Fundamental"
- 08. "Ain't No Smoke (Without Fire)"
- 09. "Whenever You Need an MC / I'll Be Around"
- 10. "Figurin' to Get Ill"
- 11. "I Wonder If She Thinks of Me"

=== Rappin' Is Fundamental - Rapping Is Fundamental (VLS) ===
- A1. "Rapping Is Fundamental (Radio Remix)"

== 1992 ==
=== IAM - Planète Mars (VLS) ===
- B1. "Planète Mars (Mo Bee Mix)"

=== Miles Davis - Blow (VLS) ===
- B1. "Blow (New Orleans Hip-Hop Remix)"
- B3. "Blow (Miles Alone)"

=== Miles Davis - Doo-Bop ===
- 01. "Mystery"
- 02. "The Doo-Bop Song"
- 03. "Chocolate Chip"
- 04. "High Speed Chase"
- 05. "Blow"
- 06. "Sonya"
- 07. "Fantasy"
- 08. "Duke Booty"
- 09. "Mystery (Reprise)"

=== Various artists - Gladiator (Music from the Motion Picture) ===
- 04. "Gladiator (Easy Mo Bee Remix)" - 3rd Bass

== 1993 ==
=== Big Daddy Kane - Looks Like a Job For... ===
- 06. "Stop Shammin'"
- 08. "Rest in Peace"
- 10. "Here Comes Kane, Scoob and Scrap" (featuring Scoob Lover and Scrap Lover)
- 13. "'Nuff Respect (Remix)"

=== Candy Dulfer - Pick Up the Pieces (VLS) ===
- A2. "Pick Up the Pieces (Easy Mo Bee Mix)"

=== Candy Dulfer - Sax-a-Go-Go (VLS) ===
- B2. "Sax-a-Go-Go (Easy Mo Bee Mix)"

=== LL Cool J - Pink Cookies in a Plastic Bag Getting Crushed by Buildings (VLS) ===
- B1. "Pink Cookies in a Plastic Bag Getting Crushed by Buildings (Remix)"

=== Various artists - Who's the Man? (soundtrack) ===
- 01. "Party and Bullshit" - The Notorious B.I.G.

== 1994 ==
=== Big Daddy Kane - Daddy's Home ===
- 02. "Brooklyn Style...Laid Out" (featuring Scoob Lover)
- 06. "That's How I Did 'Em"
- 09. "The Way It's Goin' Down"

=== Big Scoob - Suckaz Can't Hang (VLS) ===
- A1. "Suckaz Can't Hang" {co-produced by Big Scoob}
- B1. "Booty Bandit" {co-produced by Big Scoob}

=== Craig Mack - Project Funk da World ===
- 02. "Get Down"
- 05. "Flava in Ya Ear"
- 07. "Judgement Day"
- 09. "Mainline"
- 10. "When God Comes"

=== Flava in Ya Ear (VLS) ===
- A2. "Flava in Ya Ear (Remix)" [featuring The Notorious B.I.G., Rampage, LL Cool J & Busta Rhymes] {produced by Easy Mo Bee, Chucky Thompson & Puff Daddy}
- A3. "Flava in Ya Ear (Easy Mo Mix)"

=== Crystal Waters - Storyteller ===
- 09. "Listen for My Beep" {co-produced by The LG Experience}
- 12. "Piece of Lonely" [bonus track] {co-produced by The LG Experience}

=== Da Brat - Give It 2 You (CDS) ===
- 02. "Give It 2 You (Easy Mo Remix)"

=== Freddie Foxxx - So Tough (VLS) ===
- B3. "So Tough (Easy's Mo Tough Mix)" [featuring Queen Latifah]

=== Heavy D & the Boyz - Nuttin' but Love ===
- 11. "Black Coffee" {co-produced by Pete Rock}

=== Black Coffee (VLS) ===
- A1. "Black Coffee (Hip Hop Remix)"
- A2. "Black Coffee (Manslaughter Mix)"

=== I Got Love for Ya (VLS) ===
- A1. "I Got Love for Ya (Hip Hop Remix)" {additional production by Poke}

=== The Notorious B.I.G. - Ready to Die ===
- 03. "Gimme the Loot"
- 04. "Machine Gun Funk"
- 05. "Warning"
- 06. "Ready to Die"
- 09. "The What" (featuring Method Man)
- 15. "Friend of Mine"

=== Public Enemy - Muse Sick-n-Hour Mess Age ===
- 12. "Aintnuttin Buttersong" {produced by The Bomb Squad & co-produced by Easy Mo Bee}
- 17. "I Stand Accused" {produced by The Bomb Squad & co-produced by Easy Mo Bee}

=== Rappin' Is Fundamental - You Ain't Really Down (VLS) ===
- A1. "You Ain't Really Down"
- B1. "Helluva Guy"

=== Slick Rick - Behind Bars ===
- 05. "Cuz It's Wrong"

=== Thug Life - Thug Life: Volume 1 ===
- 10. "Str8 Ballin'"

=== Various Artists - Street Fighter (1994 soundtrack) ===
- 07. "Life As..." - LL Cool J {found too on Mr. Smith}

=== Whitehead Bros. - Forget I Was a G (VLS) ===
- A3. "Forget I Was a G (Easy Mo Bee's Remix)"

== 1995 ==
=== 2Pac - Me Against the World ===
- 02. "If I Die 2Nite"
- 05. "Temptations"

=== Channel Live - Reprogram (VLS) ===
- A2. "Reprogram (Remix)"

=== Dana Dane - Show Me Love (VLS) ===
- A1. "Show Me Love (Easy Mo Bee Remix)"

=== Das EFX - Hold It Down ===
- 03. "Knockin' Niggaz Off"
- 07. "Microphone Master"
- 08. "40 & a Blunt"
- 12. "Alright"
- 13. "Hold It Down"

=== Doug E. Fresh - Play ===
- 02. "It's On!" (featuring Vicious & Singing Melody) {co-produced by DJ Barry B, Doug E. Fresh & Shim Sham}

=== Herb McGruff - I Know We Can Do It (VLS) ===
- B1. "I Know We Can Do It" {produced by Heavy D & co-produced by Easy Mo Bee}

=== Ill Al Skratch - Chill with That (VLS) ===
- A1. "Chill with That (Easy Mo Bee's Radio Mix)"

=== Jamal - Last Chance, No Breaks ===
- 01. "Live Illegal"
- 04. "Insane Creation" (featuring Redman)

=== King Just - Mystics of the God ===
- 06. "No Flow on the Rodeo"
- 09. "Can I Get Some"

=== Little Shawn - Dom Perignon (VLS) ===
- B1. "Check It Out Y'All"

=== LL Cool J - Mr. Smith ===
- 06. "Life As..."

=== Nas - N/A ===
- 00. "Life Is Like a Dice Game" {unreleased}

=== Positive K - Mr. Jiggliano (VLS) ===
- B1. "It's All Gravy (Remix)"

=== Somethin' for the People - You Want This Party Started (VLS) ===
- A1. "You Want This Party Started (Easy Mo Bee Remix)" [featuring Grand Puba]

=== Trends of Culture - When Trend Men Come ===
- 02. "Make a Move"
- 10. "Other Man Lover Man"

=== Tha Tribezmen - Who Got the Vibes (VLS) ===
- A2. "Who Got the Vibes"
- B2. "Peep into the Mind"

=== Various artists - New Jersey Drive, Vol. 1 (soundtrack) ===
- 11. "Check It Out" - Heavy D

=== Various artists - One Million Strong ===
- 02. "Runnin'" - 2Pac, The Notorious B.I.G., Dramacydal & Stretch

=== Various artists - Panther (soundtrack) ===
- 06. "The Points" - The Notorious B.I.G., Coolio, Doodlebug, Big Mike, Buckshot, Redman, Ill Al Skratch, Rock, Bone Thugs-n-Harmony, Busta Rhymes, Menace Clan & Jamal

=== Various artists - Pump Ya Fist (Hip Hop Inspired by the Black Panthers) ===
- 04. "Shades of Black" - Rakim

=== Various artists - The Show: The Soundtrack ===
- 04. "My Block" - 2Pac

=== Wessyde Goon Squad - Crazy (VLS) ===
- B3. "Paper Chase"

== 1996 ==
=== Busta Rhymes - The Coming ===
- 03. "Everything Remains Raw"
- 06. "It's a Party" (featuring Zhané)

=== Lost Boyz - Legal Drug Money ===
- 04. "Jeeps, Lex Coups, Bimaz & Benz"
- 05. "Lifestyles of the Rich & Shameless"
- 10. "Is This da Part"

=== Majette - Ms. Winey Winey (Life of da Party) (VLS) ===
- B1. "Ms. Winey Winey (Life of da Party)" [Mo Bee Mix]

=== Shaquille O'Neal - You Can't Stop the Reign ===
- 16. "Game of Death" (featuring Rakim)

=== Various artists - The New Groove: The Blue Note Remix Project ===
- 09. "The Sophisticated Hippie (Easy Mo Bee Remix)" - Horace Silver

=== Various artists - Sunset Park (soundtrack) ===
- 07. "Elements I'm Among" - Queen Latifah

== 1997 ==
=== Tha Alkaholiks - Likwidation ===
- 02. "Likwidation"
- 11. "Aww Shit!" {produced by E-Swift & co-produced by Easy Mo Bee}

=== Busta Rhymes - When Disaster Strikes... ===
- 12. "Things We Be Doin' for Money (Part 1)"

=== Chubb Rock - Life (VLS) ===
- B2. "Life" (featuring Syncere)

=== The Mind ===
- 02. "I Am What I Am"
- 07. "Games We Play"

=== Craig Mack - What I Need (VLS) ===
- A2. "What I Need (Remix)"

=== The Lady of Rage - Necessary Roughness ===
- 02. "Necessary Roughness"
- 08. "Breakdown"

=== Lost Boyz - Love, Peace & Nappiness ===
- 04. "My Crew" (featuring A+ & Canibus)

=== MC Eiht - Hit the Floor Remixes (VLS) ===
- A3. "Hit the Floor (Easy Mo Bee Remix)" [featuring Daz Dillinger]

=== Nice & Smooth - IV: Blazing Hot ===
- 01. "NY (Intro)"
- 02. "Boogie Down Bronx / BK Connection" (featuring Rappin' Is Fundamental)

=== The Notorious B.I.G. - Life After Death ===
- 1-07. "I Love the Dough" (featuring Jay-Z & Angela Winbush)
- 2-04. "Going Back to Cali"

=== Zhané - Saturday Night ===
- 20. "Let's Play"

=== Various artists - Bee Mo Easy Entertainment Presents... 1997 Sampler ===
- 01. "Doo-Hop" (performed by Rappin' Is Fundamental)
- 02. "Who's da Man" (performed by Rappin' Is Fundamental)
- 03. "What's Ya Rep" (performed by Da Nation)
- 04. "Whatchuwantboo? (Cars & Cash)" (performed by Da Nation)
- 05. "Show da Meaning" (performed by Soul Survivors)
- 06. "Strictly Hip-Hop" (performed by Soul Survivors)

== 1998 ==
=== Big Daddy Kane - Veteranz' Day ===
- 02. "Uncut, Pure"
- 06. "La-La-Land"

=== Kurupt - Kuruption! ===
- 2-02. "Light Shit Up" (featuring Buckshot)

=== Paula Perry - Tales from Fort Knox ===
- 03. "Down to Die for This" (featuring Jesse West)

=== Ras Kass - Rasassination ===
- 15. "Grindin'" (featuring Bad Azz)
- 18. "The End" (featuring RZA)

== 1999 ==
=== Easy Mo Bee - Good Life (VLS) ===
- A1. "Good Life" (featuring AZ, Mack 10 & Dave Morris)

=== Goodie Mob - World Party ===
- 13. "Fie Fie Delish"

== 2000 ==
=== Craig Mack - Mack Come Thru (VLS) ===
- A1. "Mack Come Thru"
- B1. "What Up 4, 5"

=== Easy Mo Bee - Now or Never: Odyssey 2000 ===
- 02. "Sunstroke" (featuring Sauce Money, Da Ranjahz & Geda K)
- 04. "Instrumental No. 1"
- 05. "Shit's Goin' Down Tonite" (featuring Da Nation & Kurupt)
- 06. "Soul" (featuring Gang Starr)
- 07. "Talkin' Bout You" (featuring Rah Digga)
- 08. "Instrumental No. 2"
- 09. "N.Y.C." (featuring Kool G Rap & Jinx da Juvy)
- 11. "Sex, Money, Drugs" (featuring Da Nation & C-Lo)
- 12. "Instrumental No. 3"
- 13. "Sound of My Heart" (featuring Snoop Dogg, Glaze N.Y. & Ken)
- 14. "Let's Make a Toast" (featuring Flipmode Squad & American Cream Team)
- 16. "Make Em Bounce" (featuring Angie Martinez & Doo Wop)
- 17. "Dis Beat Is Mine" (featuring Rappin' Is Fundamental)
- 18. "Instrumental No. 4"
- 20. "Always Be There for You" (featuring Dave Morris & Da Nation)
- 21. "We Pledge Allegiance" (featuring Cocoa Brovaz & Prodigy)

=== Ilacoin - Keep It Street (VLS) ===
- B3. "This That & the 3rd"

=== Mack 10 - The Paper Route ===
- 10. "Hustle Game"

== 2001 ==
=== Marley Marl - Re-Entry ===
- 04. "Spazz" (featuring Solo)

=== Mr. Cheeks - John P. Kelly ===
- 05. "Here We Come"

== 2002 ==
=== Afu-Ra - Life Force Radio ===
- 04. "Hip Hop"
- 09. "Perverted Monks"
- 11. "Readjustment"

=== Various artists - D&D Project II ===
- 04. "Juicy Loosey" (performed by D&D Crew, Craig G, Don Parmazhane, Jack Venom & QNC)
- 06. "What's Life" (performed by Krumb Snatcha)

== 2003 ==
=== Alicia Keys - The Diary of Alicia Keys ===
- 04. "If I Was Your Woman / Walk on By" (produced by Alicia Keys, Easy Mo Bee & D'wayne Wiggins)

== 2004 ==
=== Mos Def - The New Danger ===
- 04. "Zimzallabim" (produced by Easy Mo Bee & Mos Def)

=== Shyheim - 21st Century Crisis (VLS) ===
- A1. "21st Century Crisis"

=== Shyheim - The Greatest Story Never Told ===
- 15. "Easy Street" (featuring La the Darkman)

== 2005 ==
=== Kindred the Family Soul - In This Life Together ===
- 11. "As of Yet" (co-produced by Kindred the Family Soul)
- 14. "Who's Gonna Comfort You (Definition)"

=== QNC - Duo Dynamic ===
- 10. "Polaroid Dimepiece"

=== Various artists - Motown Remixed ===
- 10. "Just My Imagination (Running Away with Me) (Easy Mo Bee Remix)" (performed by The Temptations)

== 2006 ==
=== Blaq Poet - Rewind: Deja Screw ===
- 11. "You Fucked Up" (featuring KL)

== 2007 ==
=== Marvin Gaye - Here, My Dear (expanded edition) ===
- 2-02. "I Met a Little Girl (Alternate Version)"

=== Wu-Tang Clan - 8 Diagrams ===
- 02. "Take It Back" (co-produced by RZA)

== 2008 ==
=== Coke La Rock & Melle Mel - Hello, Merry Christmas Baby (digital single) ===
- 01. "Hello, Merry Christmas Baby"

=== Termanology - Politics as Usual ===
- 01. "It's Time"

== 2009 ==
=== Cormega - Born and Raised ===
- 04. "Get It In" (featuring Lil' Fame)

== 2013 ==
=== L'Or Du Commun - L'Origine ===
- 06. "La Tarte Aux Frites"

=== Redman - N/A ===
- 00. "Hands Up" (featuring Mr. Cheeks & DoItAll)

== 2014 ==
=== Various artists - Golden Era Records Mixtape 2014 ===
- 09. "Keep Clear" (performed by Vents)

== 2015 ==
=== Black Rob - Genuine Article ===
- 04. "Need That Real Ish" (featuring Sean Price & Tek)

=== Easy Mo Bee & Emskee - Two for One ===
- 01. "It's Over"
- 02. "The Incredible Lyrical"
- 03. "Get Ready (Here It Comes)"
- 04. "The Everyday"
- 05. "My Death Premonition"
- 06. "The Shorty Watchtower" (featuring Jesus Mason & Oxygen)
- 07. "Sick Service"
- 08. "Caz Realism" (featuring Grandmaster Caz)
- 09. "Black Radio" (featuring Dumi Right & The Saint)
- 10. "Acts for the Climax"

=== Wiz Khalifa - Cabin Fever 3 ===
- 08. "Call Again" (featuring Problem & Juicy J)

== 2016 ==
=== Sadat X - Agua ===
- 17. "We Strive" (featuring Dres)

== 2018 ==
=== Wiz Khalifa - Rolling Papers 2 ===
- 18. "Gin and Drugs" (featuring Problem)

== 2019 ==
=== Easy Mo Bee & Big D - This Is My Life ===
- 01. "Chuck Chillout Intro"
- 02. "Make It Anywhere" (featuring Will Porter)
- 03. "Behold" (featuring Venge Millz)
- 04. "I Can't Talk" (featuring Dane Uno & Kool Keith)
- 05. "Supreme Gangster" (featuring Jus)
- 06. "Pass That Shit" (featuring Dane Uno & Kool Keith)
- 07. "I Rep NY" (featuring Elgee, Poison Pen & Skanks the Rap Martyr)
- 09. "I Miss You" (featuring Petawayne)
- 10. "Back in the Day" (featuring Fel'on, Lega Cee & Will Porter)
- 11. "My Mind Right" (featuring Will Porter)
- 12. "Frankenstein Mafia" (featuring Kool Keith)
- 17. "The Heist" (featuring Fel'on, Lega Cee & Will Porter)
- 18. "Too Raw" (featuring Lil' Fame & Will Porter)
- 19. "Gangster Shit" (featuring Fel'on, Lega Cee & Will Porter)
- 20. "I Rep NY (Remix)" (featuring Devastating Tito, Grandmaster Caz, Mic Handz, Percee P, Peter Gunz & Raf Almighty)

== 2020 ==
=== Public Enemy - What You Gonna Do When the Grid Goes Down? ===
- 15. "Rest in Beats" (featuring The Impossebulls) (produced by C-Doc & Easy Mo Bee)

== 2024 ==
=== MC Lyte - 1 of 1 ===
- 09. "All Day All Night"
