= (You Make Me Feel Like) A Natural Woman =

1967 song by Aretha Franklin

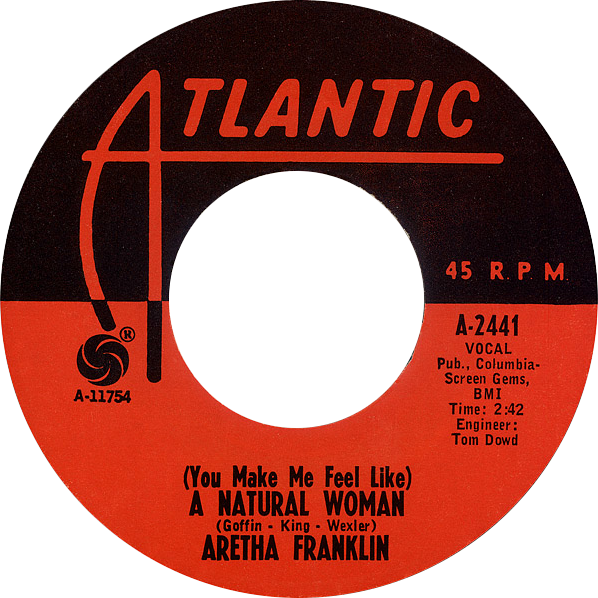

Single by Aretha Franklin

from the album Lady Soul
- B-side: "Baby, Baby, Baby"
- Released: September 1967
- Recorded: 1967
- Studio: American Sound Studio (Memphis)
- Genre: Soul
- Length: 2:45
- Label: Atlantic
- Songwriters: Gerry Goffin; Carole King; Jerry Wexler
- Producer: Jerry Wexler

Aretha Franklin singles chronology
"Baby I Love You" (1967)	"(You Make Me Feel Like) A Natural Woman" (1967)	"Chain of Fools" (1967)

Lyric video
- "(You Make Me Feel Like) A Natural Woman" on YouTube

"(You Make Me Feel Like) A Natural Woman" is a 1967 song recorded by American soul singer Aretha Franklin and released as a single by Atlantic from her album Lady Soul. The lyrics were written by Gerry Goffin from an idea by Atlantic producer Jerry Wexler, with music composed by Carole King. Created specifically for Franklin, the single reached number 8 on the Billboard Hot 100 and became one of her signature recordings. It entered the UK Singles Chart at number 79 in 2018, one week after Franklin's death, marking its first appearance there more than 50 years after its original release. Franklin later included a live version on her 1968 album Aretha in Paris.

King recorded her own version for the 1971 album Tapestry. The song has been covered by numerous artists, including Mary J. Blige and Celine Dion, whose 1995 recordings both reached the charts. Franklin performed the song in tribute to King at the 2015 Kennedy Center Honors. In June 2026, CBS News included the song in its list of the 250 essential American songs of the past 250 years.

== Background and release ==
Written by Gerry Goffin and Carole King, the song was inspired by Atlantic Records co-owner and producer Jerry Wexler. In his autobiography, Wexler recalled that he had been thinking about the idea of the "natural man" while studying African-American musical culture. After seeing King on a New York street, he called out that he wanted a "natural woman" song for Aretha Franklin's upcoming album Lady Soul. Goffin and King wrote the song that same night. In appreciation, they gave Wexler a co-writing credit.

Cash Box wrote that "from the vocal standpoint, the side is unmatched; and in the ork and production departments, excellent work add up to a shattering performance", adding that the song rises to "new emotional peaks" from a "shattering" opening.

In 1999, Franklin's 1967 recording for Atlantic was inducted into the Grammy Hall of Fame. The track was ranked number 90 on Rolling Stones 500 Greatest Songs of All Time list in 2021.

== Personnel ==
- Aretha Franklin – lead vocals
- Spooner Oldham – piano
- Tommy Cogbill – bass
- Eric Gale – guitar
- Gene Chrisman – drums
- The Sweet Inspirations – background vocals
- Carolyn Franklin – background vocals
- Erma Franklin – background vocals
- Ralph Burns - strings conductor

== Charts ==
Chart performance
Chart (1967–2018)	Peak position
Australia	36
Canada RPM	11
Netherlands (Single Top 100)	32
Sweden Heatseeker (Sverigetopplistan)	12
Switzerland (Schweizer Hitparade)	69
UK Singles (Official Charts)	79
US Billboard Hot 100	8
US Hot R&B/Hip-Hop Songs (Billboard)	2
US Cash Box Top 100	12

== Certifications ==
Certifications
Region	Certification	Certified units/sales
Italy (FIMI)	Gold	50,000^{‡}
New Zealand (RMNZ)	Platinum	30,000^{‡}
Spain (Promusicae)	Gold	30,000^{‡}
United Kingdom (BPI)	Platinum	600,000^{‡}
^{‡} Sales+streaming figures based on certification alone.

== Carole King version ==
"(You Make Me Feel Like) A Natural Woman"

Song by Carole King

from the album Tapestry
- Released: 1971
- Recorded: January 1971
- Genre: Soft rock; blue-eyed soul
- Songwriters: Gerry Goffin; Carole King; Jerry Wexler
- Producer: Lou Adler

Audio
- "(You Make Me Feel Like) A Natural Woman" on YouTube

Carole King recorded "(You Make Me Feel Like) A Natural Woman" for her 1971 album Tapestry, which later became one of the best-selling albums of all time. Her rendition adopts a slower, more minimal arrangement than Franklin's, centered on King's piano and Charles Larkey's bass. Instead of matching Franklin's vocal intensity, King delivers the song in a more conversational style.

In a contemporary review for Rolling Stone, critic Jon Landau called King's version one of the album's "pleasantest moments" and "an entirely fresh and original interpretation". A retrospective review from AllMusic notes that the recording "take[s] on added resonance when delivered in her own warm, compelling voice". Writing for Pitchfork, Jenn Pelly argues that while Franklin's version remains the definitive one, King's carries "the bespoke power of a woman reckoning with her history in song", describing Franklin's as "glory" and King's as "an act of pure conviction".

King also performed the song in concert during this period, often noting that audiences could consider her rendition in relation to the original demo recording she had created for Franklin.

== Mary J. Blige version ==
"(You Make Me Feel Like A) Natural Woman"

Single by Mary J. Blige

from the album New York Undercover soundtrack
- Released: August 22, 1995
- Length: 2:56
- Label: Uptown; MCA
- Songwriters: Gerry Goffin; Carole King; Jerry Wexler
- Producer: James Mtume

Mary J. Blige singles chronology
"I Love You" (1995)	"(You Make Me Feel Like A) Natural Woman" (1995)	"Not Gon' Cry" (1996)

Music video
- "(You Make Me Feel Like A) Natural Woman" on YouTube

American singer Mary J. Blige recorded a cover of "(You Make Me Feel Like A) Natural Woman" for the 1995 New York Undercover soundtrack. Produced by James Mtume, the single reached number 23 on the UK Singles Chart and number 95 in the United States. It was later included on international editions of her 1994 album My Life. The accompanying music video was directed by Brett Ratner.

=== Formats and track listing ===
- US cassette single – UPTCS-55139
1. "(You Make Me Feel Like A) Natural Woman" – 2:56
2. "Jeeps, Lex Coups, Bimaz & Benz" – 3:55 (performed by Lost Boyz)
- US CD single – UPTDS-55139
1. "(You Make Me Feel Like A) Natural Woman" – 2:56
2. "You Bring Me Joy" (E-Smoove's soul mix) – 5:22
- US 12-inch single – UPT12 55152
1. "(You Make Me Feel Like A) Natural Woman" – 2:56
2. "You Bring Me Joy" (E-Smoove's soul mix) – 5:22
3. "You Bring Me Joy" (E-Smoove's funk mix) – 4:39
- UK cassette single – MCSC 2108
1. "(You Make Me Feel Like A) Natural Woman" – 2:57
2. "Be Happy" (Puffy remix) – 4:40
- UK 12-inch single – MCST 2108 / UK CD single – MCSTD 2108
1. "(You Make Me Feel Like A) Natural Woman" – 2:57
2. "Be Happy" (Puffy remix) – 4:40
3. "Mary's Joint" (Puffy remix) – 3:27
4. "Changes I've Been Going Through" (Teddy Riley remix) – 4:30

=== Charts ===
Chart performance
Chart (1995–1996)	Peak position
Europe (Eurochart Hot 100)	97
Europe (European Dance Radio)	16
Netherlands (Dutch Top 40)	36
Netherlands (Single Top 100)	46
New Zealand (Recorded Music NZ)	15
Scottish Singles Sales (Official Charts)	61
UK Singles (Official Charts)	23
UK Dance (Official Charts)	7
UK Hip Hop/R&B (Official Charts)	4
US Billboard Hot 100	95
US Hot R&B/Hip-Hop Songs (Billboard)	39
US Rhythmic Airplay (Billboard)	40

=== Release history ===
Release history
Region	Date	Format(s)	Label(s)	Ref.
United States	August 22, 1995	Rhythmic contemporary radio	Uptown; MCA	
Australia	November 20, 1995	CD	Uptown; MCA	
United Kingdom	December 4, 1995	12-inch vinyl; cassette; CD	Uptown; MCA	

== Celine Dion version ==
"(You Make Me Feel Like A) Natural Woman"

Promotional single by Celine Dion

from the album Tapestry Revisited: A Tribute to Carole King
- Released: October 1995
- Recorded: 1995
- Studio: Chartmaker (Malibu); Hit Factory (New York); Record Plant (Los Angeles)
- Genre: Pop
- Length: 3:40
- Label: Atlantic
- Songwriters: Gerry Goffin; Carole King; Jerry Wexler
- Producer: David Foster

Audio
- "(You Make Me Feel Like A) Natural Woman" on YouTube

Canadian singer Celine Dion recorded a cover of "(You Make Me Feel Like A) Natural Woman" for the tribute album Tapestry Revisited: A Tribute to Carole King, released on October 31, 1995. Produced by David Foster, Dion's version was released as a promotional single in selected countries in October 1995.

Ron Rogers of RPM praised Dion's rendition, calling it "the gem of the gems". Gavin Report also responded positively, describing it as "the best single that's not gonna be a single" and noting that Dion "captures the Aretha Franklin magic with a scintillating performance that goes unchallenged on the remainder of the album".

The song entered the Canadian charts, reaching number 47 on Top Singles and number four on Adult Contemporary. In the United States, it peaked at number nine on Radio & Records's Adult Contemporary chart and number 31 on the Billboard Adult Contemporary chart.

In March 1996, "(You Make Me Feel Like A) Natural Woman" was included on the international editions of Dion's next studio album, Falling into You. In 2008, it appeared on the North American edition of her greatest hits album, My Love: Ultimate Essential Collection.

=== Charts ===
==== Weekly charts ====
Weekly chart performance
Chart (1995–1996)	Peak position
Canada Top Singles (RPM)	47
Canada Adult Contemporary (RPM)	4
UK Airplay (ERA)	79
US Adult Contemporary (Billboard)	31
US Adult Contemporary (Radio & Records)	9

==== Year-end charts ====
1995 year-end chart performance
Chart (1995)	Position
US Adult Contemporary (Radio & Records)	94

1996 year-end chart performance
Chart (1996)	Position
Canada Adult Contemporary (RPM)	53
US Adult Contemporary (Radio & Records)	66

== VH1 Divas version ==
On April 14, 1998, Celine Dion, Aretha Franklin, Mariah Carey, Shania Twain, Gloria Estefan, and Carole King performed the song during the VH1 Divas concert at the Beacon Theatre in New York. The six vocalists were recruited by the Viacom-owned music network VH1 to raise money for Save the Music, the channel's education charity. Extensively promoted in the press, the event became a ratings success for VH1, leading to the release of the concert on disc and tape on October 6, 1998. At that time, "(You Make Me Feel Like) A Natural Woman", performed by all six artists, was issued as a radio single in selected countries. It reached number nine on the airplay chart in Belgium's Wallonia on January 5, 1999.
