= Me and My Crazy World =

Single by Lost Boyz

from the album Love, Peace & Nappiness
- B-side: "Summer Time"
- Released: May 2, 1997
- Recorded: 1997
- Genre: Hip hop
- Length: 5:11
- Label: Uptown / Universal
- Songwriter: Terrance Kelly
- Producer: DJ Ron G

Lost Boyz singles chronology
"Get Up" (1997)	"Me and My Crazy World" (1997)	"What's Wrong" (1997)

"Me and My Crazy World" is the lead single released from the Lost Boyz' second album, Love, Peace & Nappiness. The song, produced by Ron "DJ Ron G" Bowser, details a love triangle in which Mr. Cheeks and two girls are involved.

The song was a minor crossover hit, peaking at number 52 on the Billboard Hot 100, while also becoming a sizable hit on the R&B and rap charts. "Me & My Crazy World" was the only charting single released from Love, Peace & Nappiness, a far cry from the five charting singles released from the previous album. Problems with the group's label, Uptown Records, which was on the verge of shutting down, caused follow-up singles from Love, Peace & Nappiness and the following album, 1999's LB IV Life, to go unnoticed.

== Single track listing ==
=== A-Side ===
1. "Me and My Crazy World" - 5:11
2. "Me and My Crazy World" (Clean Radio Mix) - 3:58
3. "Me and My Crazy World" (TV Mix) - 5:11

=== B-Side ===
1. "Summer Time" - 4:18
2. "Summer Time" (Clean version) - 4:18

== Chart history ==
Chart (1997)	Peak position
Billboard Hot 100	52
Billboard Hot R&B/Hip-Hop Singles & Tracks	23
Billboard Hot Rap Singles	5
Billboard Hot Dance Music/Maxi-Singles Sales	17
