= Bink (music producer) =

American hip hop producer

Bink!
- Also known as: Bink!; Bink Dog; B. Dog; Mr. Bink; Humble Monsta
- Born: Roosevelt Harrell III; February 20, 1972 (age 54)
- Origin: Norfolk, Virginia, U.S.
- Genre: Hip hop
- Occupations: Record producer; musician; songwriter
- Instruments: Keyboards; MPC3000; drums
- Years active: 1996–present
- Labels: Roc-A-Fella; Bad Boy

Roosevelt Harrell III (born February 20, 1972), known professionally as Bink, is an American hip hop producer from Norfolk, Virginia, who is noted for his work with Roc-A-Fella Records artists. His most high-profile work has been Jay-Z's critically acclaimed album The Blueprint, for which he produced three tracks. He is sometimes credited as Bink! or Bink Dog.

== 1990s ==
=== 1996 ===
Blackstreet – Another Level

- "Don't Leave Me" (co-produced by Teddy Riley)

=== 1997 ===
702 – All I Want (CDS)

- "All I Want" (Bink Dogg Mix)

Lost Boyz – Love, Peace & Nappiness

- "Intro" (co-produced by Charles Suitt)
- "Beasts from the East" (featuring A+, Redman & Canibus)
- "Tight Situations"
- "Day 1"
- "From My Family to Yours (Dedication)"

=== 1998 ===
Krumb Snatcha – Snatcha Season Pt. 1

- "Gangsta Disease" (Remix)

Various – Caught Up

- Lost Boyz – "Ordinary Guy"

=== 1999 ===
Tevin Campbell – Losing All Control (CDS)

- "Losing All Control" (Bink Dog Remix) (co-produced by Stevie J)

Terry Dexter – Terry Dexter

- "I Try"

A+ – Hempstead High

- "Up Top New York" (featuring Mr. Cheeks of the Lost Boyz)
- "Boyz to Men" (featuring Lost Boyz & Canibus)
- "Understand the Game" (featuring Erykah Badu)
- What the Deal" (featuring Cardan)
- "Parkside Gardens"

==== Mary J Blige - Deeper (CDS) ====
- "Deep Inside (Deep In Remix)" [featuring Mobb Deep]

ShanDozia – ShanDozia

- "Love You So Much"
- "Crazy"

Coko – Hot Coko

- "Triflin'" (featuring Eve) (co-produced by Brian Alexander Morgan)

===== Various Artists - Light It Up / 9 Lives (AZ album) =====
- AZ & Beanie Sigel - "That's Real"

Kurupt – Tha Streetz Iz a Mutha

- "Trylogy"
- "Girls All Pause" (featuring Nate Dogg & Roscoe)

U-God – Golden Arms Redemption

- "Bizarre"

Lil' Cease – The Wonderful World of Cease A Leo

- "Long Time Comin'" (featuring Mr. Bristal & Larce "Banger" Vegas of Junior M.A.F.I.A.)
- "Play Around" (featuring Lil' Kim, Mr. Bristal & Joe Hooker)

== 2000s ==
=== 2000 ===
Tamia – A Nu Day

- "Can't Go for That" (co-produced by Missy Elliott)
- "Wanna Be" (featuring Missy Elliott) (co-produced by Missy Elliott)
- "Can't Go for That (Remix)" (featuring 213) (co-produced by Missy Elliott)

Torrey Carter – ~~Unreleased track~~

- "Floss Ya Jewels" (featuring Missy Elliott) (co-produced by Missy Elliott)

Lil' Mo – ~~Unreleased track~~

- "Club 2G" (featuring Naam & Missy Elliott) (co-produced by Missy Elliott)

Various – Any Given Sunday

- Missy Elliott – "Who You Gonna Call" (co-produced by Missy Elliott & Tony McAnany)

Various – Bait

- Total with Missy Elliott – "Quick Rush" (co-produced by Missy Elliott)

Beanie Sigel – The Truth

- "Raw & Uncut" (featuring Jay-Z)
- "Ride 4 My"

Jay-Z – The Dynasty: Roc La Familia

- "1-900-Hustler" (featuring Beanie Sigel, Memphis Bleek & Freeway)
- "You, Me, Him and Her" (featuring Beanie Sigel, Memphis Bleek & Amil)

Prodigy – H.N.I.C.

- "Rock Dat Shit"

Mystikal – Let's Get Ready

- "Mystikal Fever"

=== 2001 ===
Angie Martinez – Up Close and Personal

- "Coast 2 Coast (Suavemente)" [Remix] < featuring Wyclef Jean > {co-produced by Domingo}

Aaliyah – ~~Unreleased track~~

- "Where Could He Be?" (featuring Missy Elliott & Tweet) (co-produced by Missy Elliott)

P. Diddy and the Bad Boy Family – The Saga Continues...

- "The Last Song" (featuring Loon, Mark Curry & Big Azz Ko)

Jay-Z – The Blueprint

- "The Ruler's Back"
- "All I Need"
- "Blueprint (Momma Loves Me)"

Various – Hardball

- R.O.C. – "Who Ya Love"

Various – Violator: The Album, V2.0

- Capone & Noyd – "Options"

Coo Coo Cal – Disturbed

- "Freak Nasty"

Mocha – ~~Unreleased track~~

- "The Streetz" (featuring Lil' Mo)

Fat Joe – Jealous Ones Still Envy (J.O.S.E.)

- "Get the Hell on with That" (featuring Ludacris & Armageddon)

Mr. Cheeks – John P. Kelly

- "Lights, Camera, Action!"

Faith Evans – Faithfully

- "Intro"

Nate Dogg – Music & Me

- "I Got Love"
- "Backdoor"
- "Real Pimp" (featuring Ludacris)
- "I Got Love" (Remix) (featuring B.R.E.T.T., Fabolous & Kurupt)

=== 2002 ===
Eve – Eve-Olution

- "Ryde Away"

Blackalicious – It's Going Down (Sit Back) (CDS)

- "It's Going Down Pt. 2" (BINK! Remix)

Xzibit – Man vs. Machine

- "The Gambler" (featuring Anthony Hamilton)
- "My Life, My World"

Boot Camp Clik – The Chosen Few

- "That's Tough (Little Bit)"

GZA – Legend of the Liquid Sword

- "Silent"
- "Animal Planet" (co-produced by Tyquan Walker)

Kool G Rap – The Giancana Story

- "Where You At" (featuring Prodigy)

Various – Barbershop (soundtrack)

- P. Diddy, Black Rob, Big Azz Ko & G. Dep – "And We"

Various – xXx (soundtrack)

- Mr. Cheeks – "Lights, Camera, Action!" (Club Mix) (featuring P. Diddy & Missy Elliott)

=== 2003 ===
Lene Nystrøm – Play with Me

- "Pants Up"

State Property – The Chain Gang Vol. 2

- "Rolling Down the Freeway" (featuring Freeway)

Freeway – Philadelphia Freeway

- "All My Life" (featuring Nate Dogg)
- "Victim of the Ghetto (featuring Rell)

Loon – Loon

- "Hey Woo" (featuring Missy Elliott)

Nate Dogg – Nate Dogg ~~Unreleased album~~

- "Right Back Where You Are"

Mr. Cheeks – Back Again!

- "Hands High"
- "I Apologize" (featuring Glenn Lewis)
- "Let's Get Wild" (featuring Floetry)
- "Back Again"

Dave Hollister – Real Talk

- "Never Gonna Change" (co-produced by Tyquan Walker)

Bow Wow – Unleashed

- "Follow Me"

=== 2004 ===
Jin – The Rest Is History

- "The Come Thru"

Young Gunz – Tough Luv

- "Future of the Roc"

JoJo – JoJo

- "Homeboy"

=== 2005 ===
Beanie Sigel – The B. Coming

- "One Shot Deal" (featuring Redman)

Brooke Valentine – Chain Letter

- "Ghetto Supastarz"
- "Tell Me Why? (You Don't Love Me)"

Amerie – Touch

- "Can We Go" (featuring Carl Thomas)

Memphis Bleek – 534

- "The One" (featuring Rihanna)
- "Oh Baby" (featuring Young Gunz)

=== 2006 ===
Jaheim – Ghetto Classics

- "Everytime I Think about Her" (featuring Jadakiss)

LL Cool J – Todd Smith

- "We're Gonna Make It" (featuring Mary Mary)

Various – Waist Deep (soundtrack)

- Sam Scarfo – "Who Want It"

=== 2007 ===
Royce da 5'9" – The Bar Exam

- "The Dream" (featuring Rell)

Amerie – Because I Love It

- "Paint Me Over"

Free – ~~Pressure Free~~

- "Uh Huh" (featuring Busta Rhymes) (co-produced by Precision)

Chuck Brown – We're About the Business

- "Love Nationwide"

Cassidy – B.A.R.S. The Barry Adrian Reese Story

- "Damn I Miss the Game"

Freeway – Free at Last

- "Still Got Love"
- "When They Remember"

=== 2008 ===
Skillz – The Million Dollar Backpack

- "(For Real) He Don't Own Me"
- "I'm Gon Make It"

Bishop Lamont – The Confessional

- "Africa" (featuring Soul Nana)

Rick Ross – Trilla

- "We Shinin'"

=== 2009 ===
Joe Budden – Escape Route

- "For You" (featuring Royce da 5'9")

Rick Ross – Deeper Than Rap

- "Cigar Music"

Method Man & Redman – Blackout! 2

- "Four Minutes to Lock Down'" (featuring Raekwon & Ghostface Killah)

== 2010s ==
=== 2010 ===
Kanye West – My Beautiful Dark Twisted Fantasy

- "Devil in a New Dress"

Cassidy – C.A.S.H.

- "Face 2 Face"
- "Monsta Music"

Bishop Lamont – The Shawshank Redemption/Angola 3

- "Wanted Man" (featuring Chin of The New Royales)

J. Cole – Friday Night Lights

- "Villematic"

Game – The Red Room

- "Heartbreak Hotel" (featuring Diddy)

Jamie Foxx – Best Night of My Life

- "Living Better Now" (featuring Rick Ross)

=== 2011 ===
Game – Purp & Patron

- "Soo Woo" (featuring Lil Wayne)

Eric Roberson – Mister Nice Guy

- "Try Love"

Phil Adé – A Different World

- "Scoreboard (feat. Black Cobain)"
- "King"

Gilbere Forte - Eyes of Veritas

- "Train Lights"

Slim the Mobster – War Music

- "Fuck You" (featuring Yummy Bingham)

Jadakiss – I Love You (A Dedication to My Fans)

- "Rock wit Me" (featuring Teyana Taylor)

Atiba – Foreigner

- "What You Do"

=== 2012 ===
Tony Williams – The King or the Fool

- "Another You" (featuring Kanye West)

Curren$y – The Stoned Immaculate

- "What It Look Like (featuring Wale)"

Paypa – Henny on the Rocks 2: The Bottle

- "Tried to Tell 'Em" (featuring Raekwon, Nick D's & JD Era)
- "Where's the Love" (featuring Naledge)

Hit-Boy – HITstory

- "Jay-Z Interview"

Freeway – Diamond in the Ruff

- "Dream Big" (featuring Musiq Soulchild)
- "All the Hoods" (featuring Miss Daja Thomas & Alonda Rich)
- "Lil' Mama"

Busta Rhymes – Year of the Dragon

- "Grind Real Slow"

Keyshia Cole – Woman to Woman

- "Next Move" (featuring Robin Thicke)

Fat Joe – ?

- "Pride N Joy"

=== 2013 ===
Pusha T – Wrath of Caine

- "I Am Forgiven"

John Legend – Love in the Future

- "Who Do We Think We Are" {co-produced by Tozer, Kanye West, Twilite Tone & Da Internz}

Mack Wilds – New York: A Love Story

- "My Crib" /+` Remix (feat. Pusha T) {co-produced by Salaam Remi}

=== Tree - Sunday School II ===
- "Devotion"

Paypa – Henny on the Rocks 3

- "Alright" (featuring Curtains)
- "Serenity" (featuring Nick D's & Emilio Rojas)

=== 2014 ===
Stat Quo – ATLA
- "That's Life Part 1"

Rick Ross – Mastermind

- "Mafia Music III" (featuring Sizzla & Mavado)

==== D.I.T.C. - The Remix Projedt ====
- "Da Enemy (Bink Remix)"

Mad Skillz - Made in Virginia

=== 2015 ===
Teedra Moses - Cognac & Conversation

- "That One" (featuring Anthony Hamilton)
- "Yesterday Ain't Tomorrow"

Dr. Dre - Compton

- "It's All on Me" (featuring Justus & BJ the Chicago Kid) {co-produced by Dr. Dre}

=== 2016 ===
J Dilla - The Diary

- "The Diary"

Bishop Lamont - The Reformation G.D.N.I.A.F.T

- "The Realest Shit" (featuring Ras Kass)

=== 2017 ===
Rick Ross - Rather You Than Me

- "Santorini Greece"
- "Game Ain't Based on Sympathy"
- "Scientology"

=== 2019 ===
Drake - Care Package
- "Jodeci Freestyle" (featuring J. Cole)
Dreamville - Revenge of the Dreamers III

- "Swivel" - EarthGang

== 2020s ==
=== 2021 ===
Drake - Certified Lover Boy

- "You Only Live Twice" (featuring Lil Wayne & Rick Ross) {co-produced by B-Nasty}

AZ - Doe or Die II

- "Just 4 U"
- “Bulletproof”
- “Jewels for Life” (featuring Inky Johnson)

Anthony Hamilton - Love Is the New Black

- "I’m Ready" (featuring Lil Jon)
- “I’m Sorry”
- “Mercy” (featuring Tamika Mallory)

Russ - Chomp 2

- "Enjoy the View" (featuring Mozzy)

=== 2022 ===
Dr. Dre - GTA Online: The Contract

- "Black Privilege" {co-produced by Dr. Dre}

Conway the Machine - God Don't Make Mistakes

- "Guilty"

Snoop Dogg - BODR

- "Sandwich Bag"

=== 2026 ===
AZ - Doe or Die III

- "So High" (featuring Mumu Fresh)
- "Fresh Water"
