= Back Again! (Mr. Cheeks album) =

Studio album by Mr. Cheeks
- Released: March 18, 2003
- Recorded: 2002–03
- Studio: Sony Music Studios (New York, NY); Circle House Studios (North Miami, FL); The Hit Factory; Sound On Sound (New York, NY); South Beach Studios (Miami Beach, FL); Daddy's House Recording Studio (New York, NY)
- Genre: Hip hop
- Length: 48:14
- Label: Universal
- Producer: Bink!; Chuckie Madness; Mario Winans; Mr. Sexxx; P. Diddy; Yogi "Sugar Bear" Graham

Mr. Cheeks chronology
| John P. Kelly (2001) | Back Again! (2003) | Ladies and Ghettomen (2004) |

Singles from Back Again!
- 1. "Friday Night" Released: May 14, 2002; 2. "Crush on You" Released: April 29, 2003; 3. "Hands High" Released: June 17, 2003

Back Again! is the second solo studio album by American rapper Mr. Cheeks. It was released on March 18, 2003, through Universal Records. Recording sessions took place at Sony Music Studios, Sound On Sound and Daddy's House Recording Studio in New York, at Circle House Studios and South Beach Studios in Miami, and at The Hit Factory. Production was handled by Bink!, Mr. Sexxx, Chuckie Madness, Mario Winans, P. Diddy and Yogi Bear. It features guest appearances from Floetry, Alexander O'Neal, Glenn Lewis, Journalist, Mario Winans, M.O.P., Pete Rock & CL Smooth.

The album was not as commercially successful as John P. Kelly, peaking at number 75 on the Billboard 200 and number 25 on the Top R&B/Hip-Hop Albums. Its singles, "Friday Night", "Crush on You"/"The Wire" and "Hands High", also failed to make an impact on the charts, only making it to No. 52 on the Hot R&B/Hip-Hop Songs chart with "Crush on You".

== Critical reception ==
Professional ratings
Aggregate scores
| Source | Rating |
|---|---|
| Metacritic | 67/100 |
Review scores
| Source | Rating |
| AllMusic | 4/5 stars |
| RapReviews | 6/10 |

Back Again! was met with generally favorable reviews from music critics. At Metacritic, which assigns a normalized rating out of 100 to reviews from mainstream publications, the album received an average score of 67, based on four reviews.

AllMusic's Rob Theakston called it "easily his most accomplished record since his days in the Lost Boyz". Lounch.com reviewer found it "full of juicy hip-pop hooks in the grand P. Diddy tradition". Blender reviewer found it "full of standard-issue street rhymes and treacly R&B hooks, Back Again makes you want to shout "Cut!" halfway through". Vibe reviewer stated that the album "falters when it ventures out of party mode".

== Track listing ==
| No. | Title | Writer(s) | Producer(s) | Length |
|---|---|---|---|---|
| 1. | "Supposed To" (featuring Floetry) | Terrance Kelly; Marsha Ambrosius; Natalie Stewart; Garfield Duncan; David Richardson; Dennis Edwards | Mr. Sex | 5:44 |
| 2. | "Reminisce 03'" (featuring Pete Rock, CL Smooth and Journalist) | Kelly; Peter Phillips; Corey Penn; Rafiek George; Duncan | Mr. Sex | 3:49 |
| 3. | "The Hussle" (featuring M.O.P.) | Kelly; Eric Murray; Jamal Grinnage; Duncan; James Johnson | Mr. Sex | 4:49 |
| 4. | "Hands High" | Kelly; Roosevelt Harrell III; Anita Poree; Leonard Caston Jr. | Bink! | 3:57 |
| 5. | "I Apologize" (featuring Glenn Lewis) | Kelly; Glenn Lewis; Harrell III; Earl Klugh | Bink! | 4:35 |
| 6. | "Crush on You" (featuring Mario Winans) | Kelly; Mario Winans; Jack Knight | Mario "Yellowman" Winans | 3:57 |
| 7. | "Let's Get Wild" (featuring Floetry) | Kelly; Ambrosius; Stewart; Harrell III | Bink! | 4:04 |
| 8. | "The Wire" | Kelly; Charles Shaw; Renaldo Benson; Valaida Benson | Chuckie Madness | 5:04 |
| 9. | "Back Again" | Kelly; Harrell III; Norman Whitfield | Bink! | 3:19 |
| 10. | "Pimpalicious" | Kelly; Jeremy A. Graham; Sean Combs; Charles Bobbit; Fred Wesley; James Brown | Yogi "Sugar Bear" Graham; P. Diddy | 4:06 |
| 11. | "Brighter" (featuring Alexander O'Neal) | Kelly; Shaw; James Harris III; Terry Lewis | Chuckie Madness | 4:50 |
| Total length: | | | | 48:14 |

Sample credits

- Track 1 contains elements of "Wildflower" as performed by Creative Source.
- Track 2 contains an interpolation of "They Reminisce Over You (T.R.O.Y.)".
- Track 3 contains elements of "Musical Love" as performed by the Mary Jane Girls.
- Track 4 contains elements from "Girl You Need a Change of Mind" as performed by Eddie Kendricks.
- Track 5 contains a sample of "Night Song" as performed by Noel Pointer.
- Track 8 contains a sample of "I Found The Spirit" as performed by the Four Tops.
- Track 9 contains elements from "Car Wash" as performed by Rose Royce.
- Track 10 contains a sample from "Mind Power" as performed by James Brown.
- Track 11 contains a sample of "Sunshine" as performed by Alexander O'Neal.

== Personnel ==
- Terrance "Mr. Cheeks" Kelly – vocals, executive producer
- Marsha Ambrosius – vocals (tracks: 1, 7)
- Natalie "The Floacist" Stewart – vocals (tracks: 1, 7)
- Peter "Pete Rock" Phillips – vocals (track 2)
- Corey "CL Smooth" Penn – vocals (track 2)
- Rafiek "Journalist" George – vocals (track 2)
- Eric "Billy Danze" Murray – vocals (track 3)
- Jamal "Lil' Fame" Grinnage – vocals (track 3)
- Glenn Lewis – vocals (track 5)
- Mario Winans – vocals & producer (track 6)
- Alexander O'Neal – vocals (track 11)
- Darryl "Big Baby" McClary – keyboards (tracks: 4, 7)
- Tomi Martin – guitar (track 6)
- Eric "E-Bass" Johnson – guitar (track 7)
- Garfield "Mr. Sexxx" Duncan – producer & engineering (tracks: 1–3), executive producer
- Roosevelt "Bink!" Harrell III – producer (tracks: 4, 5, 7, 9)
- Charles "Chuckie Madness" Shaw – producer (tracks: 8, 11)
- Jeremy "Yogi Bear" Graham – producer (track 10)
- Sean "Puff Daddy" Combs – producer (track 10)
- Charles Suitt – executive producer, A&R, management
- Charmaine Edwards – associate executive producer, A&R
- Jim Caruana – recording & mixing (tracks: 1, 3)
- Doug Wilson – recording (tracks: 4, 7, 9), mixing (tracks: 4, 5, 7, 9)
- Kamel Abdo – recording (track 5)
- Wayne Allison – recording (track 6)
- Caleb Shreve – recording (track 6)
- Darren Venditti – recording (tracks: 8, 11)
- Rob Paustian – recording & mixing (track 10)
- Rich Keller – mixing (track 6)
- Hernán Santiago – mixing (tracks: 8, 11)
- Bennie RM – additional Pro Tools editing (track 8)
- James Cruz – mastering
- Annalee Valencia-Bruch – art direction, design
- Christian Lantry – photography
- Sandy Brummels – creative director
- Eloise Bryan – A&R
- Nina Freeman – A&R
- Todd Ellerby – management
- Julius Erving III – management
- Jackie Rhinehart – markering management
- Eric Weissman – sample clearance

== Charts ==
| Chart (2003) | Peak position |
|---|---|
| US Billboard 200 | 75 |
| US Top R&B/Hip-Hop Albums (Billboard) | 25 |
