= Don't Be a Menace to South Central While Drinking Your Juice in the Hood (soundtrack) =

Don't Be a Menace to South Central While Drinking Your Juice in the Hood: The Soundtrack

Soundtrack album by various artists
- Released: January 9, 1996
- Recorded: April 1995 – January 1996
- Genres: R&B; hip hop
- Length: 76:13
- Label: Island Records
- Producers: Hiriam Hicks (exec.); Tim "Buttnaked" Dawg; Mr. Sex; R. Kelly; Stanley Brown; DJ Clark Kent; D-Flow Production Squad; Erick Sermon; Frankie Cutlass; Geary J. McDowell; Joe; Joshua Thompson; Lord Jamar; Mobb Deep; Mr. Dalvin; RZA; Sean "Don Juan" Greene; Tizone; T-Mor

Singles from Don't Be a Menace
- 1. "Don't Give Up" Released: October 28, 1995; 2. "Renee" Released: January 30, 1996; 3. "All the Things (Your Man Won't Do)" Released: January 30, 1996; 4. "Can't Be Wasting My Time" Released: January 30, 1996; 5. "Let's Lay Together" Released: March 19, 1996

Professional ratings
Review scores
Source	Rating
AllMusic	3/5 stars
Entertainment Weekly	B−

Don't Be a Menace to South Central While Drinking Your Juice in the Hood: The Soundtrack is the soundtrack to Paris Barclay's 1996 film Don't Be a Menace to South Central While Drinking Your Juice in the Hood. It was released on January 9, 1996, via Island Records, and consisted of hip hop and R&B music. The album peaked at number 18 on the Billboard 200, number 3 on the Top R&B/Hip-Hop Albums, and was certified Gold by the Recording Industry Association of America on March 14, 1996, for selling 500,000 copies in the United States.

It spawned five singles: The Island Inspirational All-Stars' gospel song "Don't Give Up", the Lost Boyz' "Renee", Mona Lisa featuring the Lost Boyz "Can't Be Wasting My Time", Joe's "All the Things (Your Man Won't Do)", and The Isley Brothers' "Let's Lay Together".

== Track listing ==
No.	Title	Writer(s)	Producer(s)	Length
1.	"Winter Warz" (performed by Ghostface Killah, Cappadonna, Masta Killa, Raekwon and U-God)	C. Woods; D. Hill; D. Coles; E. Turner; L. Hawkins; R. Diggs	RZA	5:10
2.	"Renee" (performed by Lost Boyz)	T. Kelly	"Buttnaked" Tim Dawg; Mr. Sex	5:00
3.	"Funky Sounds" (performed by Lil Bud and Tizone)	A. Street; Lil' Bud	Antonio "Tizone" Street	4:01
4.	"Give It Up" (performed by Jodeci)	C. Hailey; D. Degrate; J. Hailey	Mr. Dalvin	3:53
5.	"Can't Be Wasting My Time (One Dread One Ball Head Version)" (performed by Mona Lisa and Lost Boyz)	A. Evans; B. Antoine; G. Duncan; J. Austin; T. Patterson; Lost Boyz	"Buttnaked" Tim Dawg; Mr. Sex; Stanley Brown (co.)	4:34
6.	"Time to Shine" (performed by Lil' Kim and Mona Lisa)	K. Jones; R. Franklin; T. Patterson	DJ Clark Kent	4:41
7.	"Maintain" (performed by Erick Sermon)	E. Sermon	Erick Sermon	3:13
8.	"We Got More" (performed by Shock G and Luniz)	G. Husbands; G. Jacobs; J. Ellis	D-Flow Production Squad	3:07
9.	"Let's Lay Together" (performed by The Isley Brothers)	R. Kelly	R. Kelly	4:42
10.	"All the Things (Your Man Won't Do)" (performed by Joe)	J. Thomas; J. Thompson; M. Williams	Joe; Joshua Thompson	6:19
11.	"Tempo Slow" (performed by R. Kelly)	R. Kelly	R. Kelly	4:27
12.	"Live Wires Connect" (performed by UGK, Keith Murray and Lord Jamar)	B. Freeman; C. Butler; K. Murray; L. Dechalus; Coco Budda	Lord Jamar	6:03
13.	"Up North Trip" (performed by Mobb Deep)	A. Johnson; K. Muchita	Mobb Deep	4:57
14.	"Freak It Out!" (performed by Doug E. Fresh and Luke)	B. Moody; D. Davis; F. Malave; L. Campbell	Frankie Cutlass; DJ Barry B (co.); Doug E. Fresh (co.); Shim Sham (co.)	3:12
15.	"Suga Daddy" (performed by Suga-T)	T. Stevens; T-Mor	T-Mor	3:28
16.	"It's Time" (performed by Blue Raspberry)	C. Thomas; J. Thompson; G. McDowell; S. Greene	Geary J. McDowell; Sean "Don Juan" Greene	5:25
17.	"Don't Give Up" (performed by Kirk Franklin, Hezekiah Walker, Donald Lawrence and Karen Clark Sheard)	D. Lawrence; S. Brown	Stanley Brown; Donald Lawrence (co.)	3:57
Total length:				76:13

Notes

- Track 5 contains a sample of "MC's Act Like They Don't Know" performed by KRS-One
- Track 6 contains a sample of "A Love of Your Own" performed by Average White Band
- Track 16 contains a sample of "Nuthin' but a 'G' Thang" performed by Dr. Dre featuring Snoop Doggy Dogg

=== Other songs ===
Three songs did appear in the film but were not released on the soundtrack album:

- "Food Fight", written by Gregory Jacobs, Teren Delvon Jones and E. Humphrey, produced by D-Flow Production Squad, and performed by Digital Underground
- "U Can't Touch This", written by Stanley Kirk Burrell, Rick James and Alonzo Miller, and performed by Titus and Da Boyz
- "Happy Birthday", written by Patty S. Hill and Mildred J. Hill

== Charts ==
=== Weekly charts ===
Chart (1996)	Peak position
US Billboard 200	18
US Top R&B/Hip-Hop Albums (Billboard)	3

=== Year-end charts ===
Chart (1996)	Position
US Billboard 200	176
US Top R&B/Hip-Hop Albums (Billboard)	38

== Certifications ==
Region	Certification	Certified units/sales
United States (RIAA)	Gold	500,000^{^}
^{^} Shipments figures based on certification alone.
