= DJ Clark Kent =

American DJ and record producer (1966–2024)

- Born: Rodolfo Antonio Franklin II; September 28, 1966; New York City, U.S.
- Died: October 24, 2024 (aged 58); Green Brook Township, New Jersey, U.S.
- Occupations: DJ; record producer
- Years active: 1987–2024
- Spouse: Kesha Vernon (m. 2000)
- Children: 2
- Relatives: Foxy Brown (cousin)
- Musical career
- Genres: Hip hop; hardcore hip hop

Rodolfo Antonio Franklin II (September 28, 1966 – October 24, 2024), known professionally as DJ Clark Kent, was an American hip hop DJ and record producer. His crew of DJs was called "The Supermen", and his DJ moniker was derived from the name of Superman's alter ego.

== Early life and education ==
Franklin was born in Crown Heights, Brooklyn, New York, on September 28, 1966, but would often say he was born in Panama as a way to pay tribute to his family's ancestry. Franklin was raised by his mother and grandmother. He attended Brooklyn Technical High School and the Hoosac School. He also attended Emerson College but did not receive a degree. Franklin's use of the name "Clark Kent" derived from the glasses he began wearing when he was a child.

== Music career ==
In the late 1980s, Clark Kent was rapper Dana Dane's DJ. Around this time, Kent would DJ at clubs such as one just around the block from Downtown Records on West 26th Street in Manhattan which was a short-lived hip-hop hotbed with other DJs also performing there, such as Funkmaster Flex and Kid Capri. In 1989, he produced the remix for Troop's hit song "Spread My Wings."

Around the early 1990s, DJ Clark Kent took over the job of MC for the then-titled New Music Seminar, a battle between the best DJs in hip hop. Renaming it "Clark Kent's Superman Battle for World Supremacy", he would go on to host the event for a number of years. One of the most famous battles in this arena was the legendary match between DJ Noize and DJ 8-Ball, with a victory for DJ Noize.

Clark Kent later scored his first street hit with the Junior M.A.F.I.A. song "Player's Anthem" which featured The Notorious B.I.G. and was the first record that Lil' Kim appeared on. The biggest hit he produced was "Loverboy" by Mariah Carey, which peaked at #2 in the US on Billboard's Hot 100 chart. In addition to his work with Mariah, Lil' Kim, and The Notorious B.I.G., Clark also produced tracks for artists such as Lil' Vicious, Mona Lisa, 50 Cent, Canibus, Mad Skillz, Estelle, Slick Rick and Rakim, as well as groups like The Future Sound and Original Flavor, which were signed to East West Records and Atlantic Records respectively. Both groups were signed by Clark, who was a director of A&R at Atlantic at the time.

Damon Dash, one time manager of The Future Sound and Original Flavor, has credited DJ Clark Kent with introducing him to Jay-Z. Original Flavor featured the then little known rapper on their single "Can I Get Open" in 1993. This would lead to the 1994 start of Roc-A-Fella Records, and further collaborations between Clark and Jay-Z, who met when they were teenagers, as Clark would go on to produce three tracks on Jay-Z's 1996 critically acclaimed debut album, Reasonable Doubt. The tracks were: "Brooklyn's Finest", which features The Notorious B.I.G.,"Coming of Age", which features Memphis Bleek, and "Cashmere Thoughts", which contains a conversation between Clark and Jay-Z. Clark stated that he introduced B.I.G. and Jay-Z at the studio session for their collaboration. During this time, Clark would also introduce his cousin Foxy Brown to Jay-Z, and the two would team up on the hit single "Ain't No Nigga". On 2003's The Black Album, billed as his "retirement" project, Jay-Z alludes to Clark's role in helping him break into the industry, on the album's last song (titled "My 1st Song"). He states: "Clark Kent, that was good lookin' out, nigga."

Clark discovered rapper Shyne, whom he accidentally overheard rhyming in a barbershop, in 1998. Noting the young MC's vocal similarity to The Notorious B.I.G., Clark steered him towards Bad Boy Records, and Sean "Puff Daddy" Combs signed him.

== Other ventures ==
Aside from his work in music, Clark was a sneaker enthusiast who once claimed to own 3,500 pairs of footwear. In 2010, Nike commissioned him to design and unveil a "Nike Five Boroughs AF1 Low" pack of special limited edition Nike Air Force 1 shoes. He also collaborated with other popular brands, such as Adidas and New Balance.

== Personal life and death ==
In 1998, Franklin began dating Kesha Vernon, whom he married in 2000, and together they had a son. Franklin died from colon cancer at his home in Green Brook Township, New Jersey, on October 24, 2024, at the age of 58.

== Production credits ==
Album	Artist	Year	Track
She's Playing Hard to Get (the Remixes)	Hi-Five, Jay-Z	1992	She's Playing Hard (Clark Kent Supermix)
Sex Is Law	Father MC	1993	Da Wiggle {produced with Ski}
Nerissa	Nerissa	1993	In the Rain (Remix)
Destination Brooklyn	Vicious	1994	Nika
Troddin'	Shinehead	1994	Never Been in Love B4; Woman Like You
Throw Your Hands Up 12"	L.V.	1995	Throw Your Hands Up (Remix)
It's All About You 12"	Adina Howard, Busta Rhymes, Mr. Cheeks	1995	It's All About You (Remix)
Hold It Down	Das EFX	1995	Dedicated
In My Lifetime 12"	Jay-Z	1995	I Can't Get wid That
Conspiracy	Junior M.A.F.I.A.	1995	Realms of Junior M.A.F.I.A.; I Need You Tonight; Players' Anthem; Crazaay
Hooked on You 12"	Silk	1995	Hooked on You (Remix)
Feels Like the First Time 12"	Intro	1995	Funny How Time Flies (Lil' Kim Mix)
The Natural 12"	Mic Geronimo	1995	The Natural (Remix)
From Where???	Mad Skillz	1996	Move Ya Body
Don't Be a Menace to South Central While Drinking Your Juice in the Hood (soundtrack)	Lil' Kim and Mona Lisa	1996	Time to Shine
Live and Die for Hip Hop 12"	Kris Kross, Da Brat	1996	Live and Die for Hip Hop (Remix)
Things We Do for Love 12"	Horace Brown, Jay-Z	1996	Things We Do for Love (Remix)
One for the Money 12"	Horace Brown, Foxy Brown	1996	One for the Money (Remix)
The Associate (soundtrack)	Queen Latifah, Shades, Free	1996	Mr. Big Stuff
You're the One 12"	SWV, Jay-Z	1996	You're the One (Clark Kent Remix)
Get on the Bus (soundtrack)	Doug E. Fresh	1996	Tonite's the Nite
Reasonable Doubt	Jay-Z, The Notorious B.I.G.	1996	Brooklyn's Finest
Reasonable Doubt	Jay-Z, Memphis Bleek	1996	Coming of Age
Reasonable Doubt	Jay-Z	1996	Cashmere Thoughts
Feel Your Pain 12"	Whitehead Bros.	1996	Feel Your Pain (Clark Kent Remix)
11-20-79	Mona Lisa	1996	Just Wanna Please U
Daily Basis 12"	Da Rahnjaz	1996	Street Life (Daily Basis Remix)
The New World Order	Poor Righteous Teachers	1996	Dreadful Day
Bootleg Versions	Fugees	1996	Ready or Not (Clark Kent/Django version)
	Skindeep	1996	No More Games; Everybody
Life After Death	The Notorious B.I.G.	1997	Sky's the Limit
Love, Peace & Nappiness 12"	Lost Boyz	1997	Get Up (Remix)
Nothin to Lose (soundtrack)	Oran "Juice" Jones, Stu-Large, Camp Lo	1997	Poppin' That Fly (Clark Kent Remix)
I Like 12"	Shiro	1997	I Like (Remix)
The 18th Letter	Rakim	1997	Remember That; Guess Who's Back; Stay a While
Pushin' Weight 12"	Ice Cube	1998	Pushin' Weight (Clark Kent Remix)
Player's Club (soundtrack)	Ice Cube	1998	We Be Clubbin' (Clark World Remix)
Woo (soundtrack) / Cold As Ice	Charli Baltimore	1998	Money
Make It Reign	Lord Tariq and Peter Gunz	1998	Make It Reign; Massive Heat; Keep On
Touch It 12"	Monifah	1998	Touch It (C.K. Remix)
Order in the Court	Queen Latifah	1998	No/Yes
Come and Get with Me 12"	Keith Sweat	1998	Come and Get with Me (Remix)
Can-I-Bus	Canibus	1998	How We Roll; Channel Zero
Respect	Shaquille O'Neal	1998	48 @ the Buzzer; ?; ??
The Hit List	Saafir	1999	A Dog's Master
The Art of Storytellin'	Slick Rick	1999	Kill Niggaz; I Own America Pt. 1; 2 Way Street; Why Why Why; Memories
Hempstead High	A+	1999	Gotta Have It; Price of Fame {produced with B!nk}
Born Again	The Notorious B.I.G.	1999	Come On
Middle Finger U	Sauce Money	2000	Middle Finger U.; Face Off 2000
Urban Renewal	Lil' Kim, Phil Collins	2001	In the Air Tonite
City High	City High	2001	15 Will Get You 20
Glitter (soundtrack)	Mariah Carey	2001	Loverboy (Remix)
All About J	Lil J	2002	Come Out and Play {produced with Echo Levi}
Guess Who's Back	50 Cent	2002	Fuck You
Konexion	Freddie Foxxx	2003	Stick Em Up!
He's Keith Murray	Keith Murray	2003	Cristina
The Streetsweeper, Vol. 2	DJ Kay Slay	2004	Hands on the Pump
Red Gone Wild: Thee Album	Redman	2007	Diz Iz Brick City
Teflon Don	Rick Ross	2010	Super High
Harverd Dropout	Lil Pump, Kanye West	2018	I Love It {produced with Kanye, Ronny J, CBMIX}

== Sources ==
- "Clark Kent, Credits". AllMusic.
