= Get Up (Lost Boyz song) =

Single by Lost Boyz

from the album Legal Drug Money
- Released: July 17, 1996
- Recorded: 1996
- Genre: Hip hop
- Length: 3:54
- Label: Uptown / Universal
- Songwriter(s): Terrance Kelly, Raymond Rogers, James Mtume, Reggie Lucas
- Producer(s): Clark Kent, Mr. Sex

Lost Boyz singles chronology
| "Music Makes Me High" (1996) | "Get Up" (1996) | "Me and My Crazy World" (1997) |

"Get Up" is the fifth and final single released from the Lost Boyz' debut album, Legal Drug Money. Clark Kent and Mr. Sex produced the song, which prominently sampled Stephanie Mills' 1978 hit, "What Cha' Gonna Do with My Lovin.

The single peaked at number sixty on the Billboard Hot 100, like previous Lost Boyz singles, it found its greatest success on the Billboard Hot Rap Singles chart, where it reached number six.

== Single track listing ==
1. "Get Up" - 3:54
2. "Get Up" (Instrumental) - 3:47
3. "Get Up" (Remix) - 3:54
4. "Get Up" (Remix Instrumental) - 4:10

== Chart history ==
=== Peak positions ===
| Chart (1997) | Peak position |
|---|---|
| Billboard Hot 100 | 60 |
| Billboard Hot R&B/Hip-Hop Singles & Tracks | 31 |
| Billboard Hot Rap Singles | 6 |
| Billboard Hot Dance Music/Maxi-Singles Sales | 4 |

=== Year-End charts ===
| End of year chart (1997) | Position |
|---|---|
| Billboard Hot Rap Singles | 30 |
| Billboard Hot Dance Music/Maxi-Singles Sales | 44 |
