= Brooklyn's Finest (song) =

1996 song by Jay-Z featuring The Notorious B.I.G.

Song by Jay-Z featuring The Notorious B.I.G.

from the album Reasonable Doubt
- Released: June 25, 1996
- Studio: Daddy's House (New York)
- Genre: Hip-hop
- Length: 4:35
- Label: Roc-A-Fella
- Songwriters: Shawn "Jay-Z" Carter; Christopher "The Notorious B.I.G." Wallace
- Producer: DJ Clark Kent

"Brooklyn's Finest" is a song by American rapper Jay-Z featuring fellow Brooklyn rapper The Notorious B.I.G., released as the third track on Jay-Z's 1996 debut album Reasonable Doubt. Produced by DJ Clark Kent, the song features a competitive back-and-forth lyrical exchange between the two rappers, with each MC trading bars in a format that resembles battle rap. The track samples the Ohio Players' "Ecstasy" and was recorded at Daddy's House Recording Studio in New York.

== Background and recording ==
The collaboration between Jay-Z and The Notorious B.I.G. was not originally planned. According to DJ Clark Kent, who produced the track, the song began as a solo Jay-Z track titled "No More Mr. Nice Guy" or "Once We Get Started."

During a separate recording session, Biggie accidentally heard the beat and immediately wanted to use it for himself. Despite Biggie's insistence, Clark Kent initially refused to give him the beat, explaining it was already committed to Jay-Z. However, Biggie was persistent, saying "Nah, man. Fuck that. I need to be on that record." This led to Clark Kent's decision to have Biggie wait in his car outside the studio while he negotiated with Jay-Z and Roc-A-Fella co-founder Damon Dash.

The legal and financial complications were significant obstacles. Damon Dash was initially against the collaboration, refusing to pay royalties to Bad Boy Records and Puff Daddy. According to Clark Kent, he persuaded Dash and Jay-Z to proceed with the recording session and address the business arrangements afterward.

=== First meeting ===
When Clark Kent finally brought Biggie into the studio, the two rappers had never met before, despite growing up just blocks apart in Brooklyn. Both Jay-Z and Biggie attended the same high school, along with future rap star Busta Rhymes.

According to Clark Kent, the two rappers immediately connected upon meeting: "They met each other and it wasn't even like they had a conversation; they just started to laugh, clap hands—because there was an insane amount of respect for each other's craft."

=== Recording process ===
The recording session that followed became notable in hip-hop lore. Jay-Z, known for his ability to compose lyrics entirely in his head without writing them down, asked Clark Kent to play the beat for nearly 20 minutes while he stood and listened. He then went into the recording booth and completely rewrote his verses on the spot, knowing who he was going to compete with.

When Jay-Z emerged from the booth and asked "Are you ready?" Biggie was completely mystified. According to Clark Kent, "Big was like 'What the fuck are you talking about?' And then he looks at me and goes 'What the fuck did he just do?'" After Clark explained that Jay-Z didn't write his rhymes down, Biggie responded, "Clark, that shit was crazy...Nah, I'm not ready. I'll come back for this."

Biggie left the studio that night and didn't return for two months to complete his verses. This delay allowed him to craft his response to Jay-Z's performance.

According to Roc-A-Fella co-founder Kareem "Biggs" Burke, who was present during the recording session, the atmosphere in the studio was memorable. "What I smelled was a lot of weed. Biggie actually smoked like 60 blunts that day," Burke recalled. Burke described Biggie's presence as overwhelming: "When Biggie walked through, it was just a huge presence walking into the room. You felt his presence when he came in."

The moment when both rappers realized they didn't write lyrics down became legendary. Burke witnessed the exchange: "The engineer came and dropped a pad and a pen right in between them. Jay looks at it and then he pushes it over to Big. Big looks at it and pushes it back. That's the time they realized that neither one of them wrote lyrics [down on paper]." Burke noted that "Jay actually went in and did everything in five minutes. He broke down the song and left all these parts [for Big]." When Biggie left that night, he joked to Jay-Z: "When I give you a song to rhyme on for my album, I'ma make sure it's a regular beat so you could do a straight sixteen, not all this breakdown."

== Production and musical elements ==
The beat for "Brooklyn's Finest" was originally created by Clark Kent for one of Damon Dash's groups called the Future Sound. The production features a sample from the Ohio Players' "Ecstasy," which Clark Kent flipped to create the track's distinctive sound.

The song's structure is unique in that instead of each MC having their own complete verse, they trade bars back and forth in a competitive format that resembles battle rap. The track has alternating verses between Jay-Z and Biggie alongside a hook performed by Clark Kent.

The hook was created at the last minute when Clark Kent found himself alone in the studio at 3 AM, with both Jay-Z and Biggie having left without recording it. Clark Kent ended up performing the hook himself, using the line "Jay-Z and Biggie Smalls, nigga, shit your drawers" from the song's lyrics.

== Lyrics and themes ==
"Brooklyn's Finest" serves as a representation of Brooklyn, with both rappers representing their shared borough with pride and authenticity. The song opens with Jay-Z's declaration: "Ayo, peep the style and the way the cops sweat us / The number one question is can the Feds get us?"

The track features extensive references to Brooklyn neighborhoods and street culture, with both MCs drawing from their shared experiences growing up in the borough during the crack cocaine era. Biggie references his Bed-Stuy roots, while Jay-Z represents the Marcy Projects where he was raised.

== Critical reception and legacy ==
"Brooklyn's Finest" has been consistently praised in the decades since its release. Billboard ranked the song at #18 on their list of The Notorious B.I.G.'s 25 Best Songs, noting that it "became a stunning back-and-forth that found a young and hungry Jigga matching wits with Brooklyn's champion." The publication highlighted how the track came to represent "a passing of the baton" after Biggie's death the following year.

Rolling Stone included it in their list of The 50 Best Notorious B.I.G. Songs, describing it as "one of the standout moments from Jay's classic Reasonable Doubt." The publication noted that it was "a major look for a then-independent artist who had begun to make waves with buzz singles like 'In My Lifetime.'"

The song helped establish Jay-Z in the hip-hop landscape. According to Clark Kent, the collaboration was crucial in proving that Jay-Z could hold his own alongside established stars like Biggie. This validation was essential for Jay-Z's career trajectory and helped establish the foundation for his future success.

The track has also been recognized for its role in cementing Brooklyn's legacy as a hotbed for legendary MCs. While other rappers like Big Daddy Kane and Masta Ace came before them, Biggie and Jay-Z solidified Brooklyn's reputation through their collaboration on this track.

HotNewHipHop included the song in their "Top 10 Biggie Collaborations" list, describing it as "the duo's love song to their home-borough." XXL ranked "Brooklyn's Finest" as the #3 best collaboration in The Notorious B.I.G.'s catalog.

== Controversy and Tupac beef ==
The collaboration inadvertently sparked controversy when it led to tensions between Jay-Z and Tupac Shakur. According to Irv Gotti, who was initially against the collaboration, "That's why 'Pac was shitting on Jay because of 'Brooklyn's Finest.'"

Gotti explained that Tupac feared Jay-Z might get embroiled in his ongoing feud with Biggie, leading to the California rapper dissing Jay-Z on several tracks. This tension was further fueled by Biggie's line in "Brooklyn's Finest": "If Faith have twins, she'd probably have two Pacs," which referenced rumors about Tupac and Biggie's wife Faith Evans.

Jay-Z reportedly recorded a response to Tupac's disses, but chose not to release it after Tupac's death in September 1996 out of respect. According to DJ Clark Kent, "Jay did a record going at 'Pac, but just as it was about to come out, son died...We performed it, though. We performed it once."

== The last conversation ==
"Brooklyn's Finest" would be one of only two official collaborations between Jay-Z and Biggie before the latter's death in March 1997. The second collaboration, "I Love The Dough," appeared on Biggie's posthumous album Life After Death.

According to multiple sources, Jay-Z was one of the last people Biggie spoke to before his death. On the night of March 8, 1997, Biggie called Jay-Z from Los Angeles while attending a Vibe magazine party after the Soul Train Music Awards.

During their conversation, Biggie expressed his excitement about being back in Los Angeles, saying "He felt like he finally was back in Los Angeles and everything was where it was supposed to be." Tragically, Biggie was murdered just an hour later in a drive-by shooting, making this their final conversation.

== Cultural impact ==
According to Atwood Magazine, the collaboration between Jay-Z and Biggie on "Brooklyn's Finest" influenced how hip-hop collaborations were approached in the genre.

== Personnel ==
Credits are adapted from the liner notes of Reasonable Doubt.

- Jay-Z – vocals, songwriting
- The Notorious B.I.G. – vocals, songwriting
- DJ Clark Kent – production, hook vocals
- Damon Dash – executive production
