= Music Makes Me High =

Single by Lost Boyz

from the album Legal Drug Money
- Released: March 3, 1996
- Recorded: 1995
- Genre: Hip hop
- Length: 4:32
- Label: Uptown / Universal
- Songwriter(s): Terrance Kelly
- Producer(s): Charles Suitt, Mr. Sex

Lost Boyz singles chronology
"Renee" (1996)	"Music Makes Me High" (1996)	"Get Up" (1996)

"Music Makes Me High" is the fourth single released from the Lost Boyz' debut album, Legal Drug Money. The original version of the song was produced by Mr. Sex and Charles Suitt, the song's official remix was produced by L.T. Hutton and featured Tha Dogg Pound and a then unknown Canibus in his first official appearance. The remix had a music video released which showed the Lost Boyz, Tha Dogg Pound and Canibus at a pool party.

The song was the second most successful single of the five released from Legal Drug Money, after "Renee". It peaked at number 51 on the Billboard Hot 100 and number five on the Billboard Hot Rap Singles.

== Single track listing ==
No.	Title	Producer	Length
1.	"Music Makes Me High (Album Version)"	Mr Sex, Charles Suitt	4:30
2.	"Music Makes Me High (L.T. Hutton Mix)" (Featuring Tha Dogg Pound and Canibus)	L.T. Hutton	4:05
3.	"Music Makes Me High (Frankie Cutlass Mix)"	Frankie Cutlass	3:56
4.	"Music Makes Me High (L.T. Hutton Extended Mix)" (Featuring Tha Dogg Pound and Canbus)	L.T. Hutton	5:11

== Chart history ==
=== Peak positions ===
Chart (1996)	Peak position
Billboard Hot 100	51
Billboard Hot R&B/Hip-Hop Singles & Tracks	28
Billboard Hot Rap Singles	5
Billboard Hot Dance Music/Maxi-Singles Sales	3

=== Year-End charts ===
End of year chart (1996)	Position
Billboard Hot Rap Singles	26
