= Renee (song) =

Single by Lost Boyz

from the album Legal Drug Money and Don't Be a Menace to South Central While Drinking Your Juice in the Hood: The Soundtrack
- Released: January 30, 1996
- Recorded: 1995
- Studio: D&D Recording Studios
- Genre: Hip hop
- Length: 5:00
- Label: Uptown
- Songwriters: Terrance Kelly; Dexter Archer
- Producers: Mr. Sexxx; "Buttnaked" Tim Dawg

Lost Boyz singles chronology
"Jeeps, Lex Coups, Bimaz & Benz" (1995)	"Renee" (1996)	"Music Makes Me High" (1996)

"Renee" is a song by American rap group Lost Boyz, released in January 1996 by Uptown Records, as the third single from their first studio album, Legal Drug Money (1996) and the Don't Be a Menace to South Central While Drinking Your Juice in the Hood soundtrack. It samples the Janet Jackson song "Funny How Time Flies (When You're Having Fun)" from 1987. It became the Lost Boyz' most successful single, reaching numbers 26 and 33 on the US Cash Box Top 100 and Billboard Hot 100 charts (their only one to reach to top 40). "Renee" earned a gold certification from the RIAA for sales of 500,000 copies.

== Song information ==
The song's lyrics discuss the narrator, a young man, who meets a woman named Renee while coming back from John Jay College of Criminal Justice. The narrator promptly attempts to initiate a relationship. The song describes that Renee is studying to be a lawyer, while the narrator is a writer. The pair date for several weeks, but the relationship ends abruptly when she is shot to death by a burglar at a robbery. The moral of the song is "ghetto love is the law that we live by," describing the inevitable suffering of tragedy by those raised in crime-ridden areas.

== Charts ==
=== Weekly charts ===
Weekly chart performance for "Renee"
Chart (1996)	Peak position
US Billboard Hot 100	33
US Hot R&B/Hip-Hop Singles & Tracks (Billboard)	13
US Hot Rap Singles (Billboard)	3
US Cash Box Top 100	26

=== Year-end charts ===
Year-end chart performance for "Renee"
Chart (1996)	Position
US Hot R&B/Hip-Hop Singles & Tracks (Billboard)	65
US Hot Rap Singles (Billboard)	17

== Certifications ==
Certifications for "Renee"
Region	Certification	Certified units/sales
United States (RIAA)	Gold	500,000^{^}
^{^} Shipments figures based on certification alone.
