= Can't Be Wasting My Time =

Single by Mona Lisa

from the album 11-20-79 and Don't Be a Menace to South Central While Drinking Your Juice in the Hood: The Soundtrack
- Released: January 30, 1996
- Recorded: 1995
- Genre: R&B, hip hop soul
- Length: 4:34
- Label: Island
- Songwriters: B. Antoine, G. Duncan, T. Patterson, J. Austin, A. Evans
- Producer: Tim Patterson a.k.a. "Buttnaked" Tim Dawg

Mona Lisa singles chronology
"Can't Be Wasting My Time" (1996)	"You Said" (1996)

"Can't Be Wasting My Time" is a song by American contemporary R&B singer Mona Lisa. It features a rap from American hip hop group The Lost Boyz and was released in January 1996 by Island Records, as Mona Lisa's debut single from her first and only album, 11-20-79 (1996). The song is also featured on the 1996 soundtrack Don't Be a Menace to South Central While Drinking Your Juice in the Hood: The Soundtrack. "Can't Be Wasting My Time" peaked at numbers 48 and 65 on the US Cash Box Top 100 and Billboard Hot 100 charts. It also reached number 12 on the Billboard Hot Dance Music/Maxi-Singles Sales chart and number 20 on the Billboard Hot R&B/Hip-Hop Singles & Tracks chart. The accompanying music video was directed by Brian Luvar.

== Critical reception ==
Billboard magazine's review of the single said, "She is also given a memorable midtempo jam that pleases more with each spin. The only misfire of this single is the injection of tepid rapping by Lost Boyz, which distracts from Mona Lisa's juicy vamp and breaks the flow of the track."

== Track listings ==
- 12", 33 1/3 RPM, Vinyl
1. "Can't Be Wasting My Time" (w/ Rap) - 4:34
  (feat. Lost Boyz)
2. "Can't Be Wasting My Time" (w/o Rap) - 4:00
3. "Can't Be Wasting My Time" (Instrumental) - 5:36
4. "Can't Be Wasting My Time" (Video Version w/ Rap) - 4:14
  (feat. Lost Boyz)

== Personnel ==
Information taken from Discogs.

- artwork – Edward ODowd
- production – "Buttnaked" Tim Dawg, Mr. Sex

== Charts ==
Chart (1996)	Peak position
US Billboard Hot 100	65
US Hot Dance Music/Maxi-Singles Sales	12
US Hot R&B/Hip-Hop Singles & Tracks	20
US Cash Box Top 100	48
