= Just Wanna Please U =

Single by Mona Lisa

from the album 11-20-79
- Released: November 26, 1996
- Genre: R&B
- Length: 4:20
- Label: Island
- Songwriter(s): Mona Lisa, R. Franklin, B. Caldwell, A. Kettner
- Producer(s): Clark Kent

Mona Lisa singles chronology
"You Said" (1996)	"Just Wanna Please U" (1996)	"You Gave Me Love" (1996)

"Just Wanna Please U" is a song by American R&B artist Mona Lisa which was recorded for her debut album 11-20-79 (1996). The song was released as the album's third and final single in November 1996.

== Track listings ==
12", Vinyl

1. "Just Wanna Please U" (Album Version) - 4:20
2. "Just Wanna Please U" (Stevie J. Version) - 4:07
  (feat. The LOX)
3. "Just Wanna Please U" (Stevie J. Version w/o Rap) - 4:07

12", Vinyl

1. "Just Wanna Please U" (Stevie J. version) - 4:07
  (feat. The LOX)
2. "Just Wanna Please U" (Stevie J. version w/o rap) - 4:07
3. "Just Wanna Please U" (Album version) - 4:20
4. "Just Wanna Please U" (Stevie J. A cappella version) - 4:07
  (feat. The LOX)

== Personnel ==
Information taken from Discogs.

- executive production – Hiriam Hicks, Tim "Dawg" Patterson
- lyrics – The LOX, Mona Lisa, Kelly Price
- production – Clark Kent
- rapping – The LOX
- remixing – Stevie J.

== Chart performance ==
Chart (1996)	Peak position
U.S. Hot R&B/Hip-Hop Singles & Tracks	65
