= Lights, Camera, Action! (Mr. Cheeks song) =

Single by Mr. Cheeks

from the album John P. Kelly
- Released: August 12, 2001
- Recorded: 2001
- Studio: The Hit Factory Criteria (Miami, FL)
- Genre: Hip hop
- Length: 4:21
- Label: Universal
- Songwriter: Terrance Kelly
- Producer: Bink

Mr. Cheeks singles chronology
"Lights, Camera, Action!" (2001)	"Friday Night" (2002)

"Lights, Camera, Action!" is the debut single by Mr. Cheeks, from his debut album John P. Kelly. The song was released in August 2001 and produced by Bink, who used a sample of "Keep on Truckin'" by Eddie Kendricks. The song became Mr. Cheeks' first and only major hit as a solo artist, reaching No. 14 on the Billboard Hot 100 and topping the Billboard R&B charts for one week.

The official remix featured Missy Elliott, P. Diddy and Petey Pablo, this version appeared on the 2002 XXX soundtrack.

== Background ==
The "Lights, Camera, Action!" instrumental was first offered to Jay-Z, who turned it down as he considered it "too slow" for his flow.

== Single track listing ==
1. "Lights, Camera, Action!" (LP Version) - 4:28
2. "Lights, Camera, Action!" (Remix) - 4:06
3. "Lights, Camera, Action!" (Radio Edit) - 3:44
4. "Lights, Camera, Action!" (Explicit) - 3:44
5. "Lights, Camera, Action!" (Instrumental) - 4:03

== Charts ==
=== Weekly charts ===
Chart (2002)	Peak position
US Billboard Hot 100	14
US Hot R&B/Hip-Hop Songs (Billboard)	1
US Hot Rap Songs (Billboard)	1
US Rhythmic Airplay (Billboard)	25

=== Year-end charts ===
Chart (2002)	Position
US Billboard Hot 100	49
US Billboard Hot R&B/Hip-Hop Singles & Tracks	9
US Billboard Hot Rap Singles	13
