= Legal Drug Money =

Studio album by Lost Boyz
- Released: June 4, 1996
- Recorded: 1994–1996
- Studio: Greene St. Recording (New York, NY); Quad Recording Studio (New York, NY); D&D Studios (New York, NY)
- Genre: Hip hop
- Length: 71:03
- Label: Universal; MCA
- Producer: Charles Suitt (also exec.); Big Dex; Big L; "Buttnaked" Tim Dawg; Dwarf the Black Prince; Easy Mo Bee; Mr. Cheeks; Mr. Sexxx; Pete Rock

Lost Boyz chronology
Legal Drug Money (1996)	Love, Peace & Nappiness (1997)

Singles from Legal Drug Money
- 1. "Lifestyles of the Rich & Shameless" Released: April 25, 1995; 2. "Jeeps, Lex Coups, Bimaz & Benz" Released: August 22, 1995; 3. "Renee" Released: January 30, 1996; 4. "Music Makes Me High" Released: March 3, 1996; 5. "The Yearn" Released: June 25, 1996; 6. "Get Up" Released: July 17, 1996

Professional ratings
Review scores
Source	Rating
AllMusic	4/5 stars
Muzik	4/5 stars
RapReviews	7.5/10
The Source	3.5/5 stars

Legal Drug Money is the debut studio album by American hip hop group the Lost Boyz. It was released on June 4, 1996, via Universal Records. The recording sessions took place at Greene St. Recording, Quad Recording Studios and D&D Studios in New York. It was produced by Big Dex, Mr. Sex, Easy Mo Bee, Big L, "Buttnaked" Tim Dawg, Dwarf the Black Prince, Pete Rock, member Mr. Cheeks, with Charles Suitt serving as co-producer and executive producer.

The album peaked at number six on the Billboard 200 and topped the Top R&B/Hip Hop Albums chart in the United States. It was certified Gold by the Recording Industry Association of America on August 7, 1996.

It featured six singles: "Lifestyles of the Rich & Shameless", "Jeeps, Lex Coups, Bimaz & Benz", "Renee", "Music Makes Me High", "The Yearn" and "Get Up". Five of the album's singles made it to US Billboard Hot 100. "Renee" previously was included in Don't Be a Menace to South Central While Drinking Your Juice in the Hood: The Soundtrack and received Gold status by the RIAA. Slightly different version of the song "The Yearn" appeared on 1996 benefit compilation album America Is Dying Slowly.

== Track listing ==
No.	Title	Lyrics	Music	Producer(s)	Length
1.	"Intro"	Terrance Kelly; Raymond Rogers		Mr. Cheeks	1:25
2.	"The Yearn"	Kelly; Rogers		Pete Rock	3:49
3.	"Music Makes Me High"	Kelly; Rogers^{[a]}		Mr. Sex; Charles Suitt^{[c]}	4:31
4.	"Jeeps, Lex Coups, Bimaz & Benz"	Kelly; Tim Patterson	Osten S. Harvey Jr.	Easy Mo Bee	4:32
5.	"Lifestyles of the Rich & Shameless"	Kelly	Harvey Jr.	Easy Mo Bee	4:21
6.	"Renee"	Kelly	Garfield Duncan	Mr. Sex	4:54
7.	"All Right"	Kelly	Dexter Archer	Big Dex	5:50
8.	"Legal Drug Money"	Kelly; Rogers	Archer; Joe Quinde	Big Dex	5:40
9.	"Get Up"	Kelly	Duncan	Mr. Sex	4:04
10.	"Is This Da Part"	Kelly	Patterson; Quinde	Easy Mo Bee	3:45
11.	"Straight From Da Ghetto"	Kelly; Patterson	Archer; Patterson	Big Dex; "Buttnaked" Tim Dawg	3:47
12.	"Keep It Real"	Kelly	Archer	Big Dex; Big L	4:11
13.	"Channel Zero"	Kelly	Archer	Big Dex	5:37
14.	"Da Game"	Kelly		Big Dex	3:43
15.	"1, 2, 3"	Rogers; Kelly	Dwarf the Black Prince	Dwarf the Black Prince	6:53
16.	"Lifestyles of the Rich and Shameless (Remix)"	Kelly		Mr. Sex	4:01
Total length:					71:03

Notes

- ^{^[a]} signifies an additional lyricist.
- ^{^[c]} signifies a co-producer.

Sample credits

- Track 1 contains elements from "Summer Madness" written by Alton Taylor, Robert "Spike" Mickens, Robert "Kool" Bell, Dennis "Dee Tee" Thomas, Richard "Ricky West" Westfield, George Brown, Claydes Charles Smith and Ronald Bell and performed by Kool & the Gang
- Track 3 contains a sample from "Bounce, Rock, Skate, Roll" written by Vaughan Mason and performed by Vaughan Mason & Crew
- Track 5 contains elements from "Jealousy" performed by Club Nouveau
- Track 8 contains elements from "Whispering Pines" performed by Crusaders
- Track 9 interpolates "What You Gonna Do with My Lovin" by Stephanie Mills, and contains samples from "Funky Sensation" written by Kenton Nix and performed by Gwen McCrae
- Track 10 contains samples from "Slow Down" written by Carl McIntosh, Steve Nichol and Jane Eugene, "The Look of Love" by Isaac Hayes, and "Jealousy" by Club Norveau
- Track 11 contains elements from "Risin' to the Top" written by Keni Burke, Allan W. Felder and Norma Jean Wright
- Track 12 interpolates "You're the One I Need" written by Barry White and Smeed Hudman as recorded by Barry White
- Track 14 contains elements from "Playing Your Game, Baby" performed by Barry White

== Personnel ==
- Terrance "Mr. Cheeks" Kelly – lyrics, vocals (tracks: 4–7, 9–14, 16), producer (track 1)
- Raymond "Freaky Tah" Rogers – lyrics (tracks: 1, 2, 8, 15), additional lyrics (track 3), vocals (tracks: 4–7, 9–14, 16)
- Eric "Pretty Lou" Ruth – additional vocals (track 8), backing vocals (track 14)
- Ronald "Spigg Nice" Blackwell – additional vocals (track 8), backing vocals (track 14)
- Peter "Pete Rock" Philips – producer & mixing (track 2)
- Garfield "Mr. Sexxx" Duncan – producer (tracks: 3, 6, 9, 16), recording (tracks: 3, 16), mixing (tracks: 3, 9, 16), production coordinator
- Osten "Easy Mo Bee" Harvey Jr. – producer (tracks: 4, 5, 10)
- Dexter "Big Dex" Archer – producer (tracks: 7, 8, 12–14), mixing (tracks: 12, 14)
- Tim "Buttnaked Tim Dawg" Patterson – lyrics (tracks: 4, 11), producer (track 11), mixing (tracks: 1, 4, 5, 7, 11, 13, 15), A&R, stylist
- Lamont "Big L" Coleman – producer (track 12)
- Dwarf The Black Prince – producer (track 15)
- Charles Suitt – co-producer (track 3), executive producer, A&R, management
- Joe Quinde – mixing (tracks: 1, 4, 5, 7, 11–15)
- Jamie Staub – engineering (track 2)
- Chris Barnett – recording (tracks: 3, 16), mixing (tracks: 3, 9, 16)
- Michael Sarsfield – mastering
- Sandie Lee Drake – art direction
- Kenny Gravillis – design
- Danny Clinch – photography
- Kathy Baylor – A&R
- Dino Delvaille – A&R
- Lisa Lindo – stylist
- Ericka Riggs – make-up

== Charts ==
=== Weekly charts ===
Chart (1996)	Peak position
UK Albums (OCC)	64
UK R&B Albums (OCC)	12
US Billboard 200	6
US Top R&B/Hip-Hop Albums (Billboard)	1

=== Year-end charts ===
Chart (1996)	Position
US Billboard 200	122
US Top R&B/Hip-Hop Albums (Billboard)	26

== Certifications ==
Region	Certification	Certified units/sales
United States (RIAA)	Gold	500,000^{^}
^{^} Shipments figures based on certification alone.

== Singles ==
Year	Song	Chart positions			
Year	Song	US Hot 100	US Hot R&B	US Hot Rap	US Hot Dance Sales
1995	"Lifestyles of the Rich & Shameless"	91	60	10	20
1995	"Jeeps, Lex Coups, Bimaz & Benz"	67	63	11	21
1996	"Renee"	33	13	3	2
1996	"Music Makes Me High"	51	28	5	3
1997	"Get Up"	60	31	6	4

== See also ==
- List of number-one R&B albums of 1996 (U.S.)
