= Stephen Dent =

American audio engineer

Stephen Dent (born September 30, 1966) is an American audio engineer and managing director at Daddy's House Recording Studio in New York. He is a Grammy award nominee (1999) and worked on the platinum album Bad Boys II.

== Education ==
Dent attended Prince George's Community College from 1986 - 1988. He went on to study at Omega Recording Audio Engineering and Music Production from 1989 - 1991 and the Institute of Audio Research 1994 - 1995.

== Daddy's House Recording Studio ==
Since 2004, Dent has been the Managing Director at Daddy's House Recording Studio, located in the heart of New York City. He has also been the director of Bad Boy Entertainment, which is run from the Daddy's House studio. Many important names in the hip-hop, rap, R&B, and crunk industries have recorded at Daddy's House and have had their albums engineered, mixed, and mastered by Dent personally. Some of these include: The Notorious B.I.G., Shyne, Diddy, Mary J. Blige, Faith Evans, Nas, Lil' Kim, Black Rob, Kid Capri, and SWV.

In addition to recording these artists, Daddy's House Recording Studio and Dent have also recorded and released the critically acclaimed soundtrack for the movie Notorious, about the life of the Notorious B.I.G. (Christopher Wallace). Other albums engineered and mixed at Daddy's House include: Bad Boy's R&B Hits, We Invented the Remix, Love & Life, The Notorious K.I.M., Money, Power and Respect by The LOX, and Credentials by Rufus Blaq. In 2003, the single Dent engineered for Jason "Jay E" Epperson was listed in Billboard's Number 1 list.

== Other Engineering Accomplishments ==
- Notorious (soundtrack): The Notorious Movie - 2009
- The Notorious B.I.G.: Greatest Hits - 2007
- Shyne: Godfather Buried Alive - 2004
- Diddy: Shake Ya Tailfeather - 2003
- Mary J. Blige: Love & Life - 2003
- Diddy: We Invented the Remix - 2002
- Faith Evans: Faithfully - 2001
- Nas: QB Finest - 2000
- Lil' Kim: Notorious K.I.M -2000
- Black Rob: Life Story - 1999
- Kid Capri: Soundtrack to the Streets - 1998
- SWV: Release Some Tension - 1997
