= John P. Kelly (album) =

Studio album by Mr. Cheeks
- Released: October 16, 2001
- Recorded: 2000–01
- Genre: Hip-hop
- Length: 55:23
- Label: Universal
- Producer: Bink!; Caspa; Dejah; DJ Sage; Easy Mo Bee; J.J. Brown; Mas; Mr. Cheeks; Mr. Sexxx; Rated R; Stephen Marley; Terence Dudley

Mr. Cheeks chronology
John P. Kelly (2001)	Back Again! (2003)

Singles from John P. Kelly
- 1. "Lights, Camera, Action!" Released: August 7, 2001; 2. "Friday Night" Released: May 14, 2002

Professional ratings
Review scores
Source	Rating
AllMusic	3/5 stars
HipHopDX	3/5

John P. Kelly is the debut solo studio album by American rapper Mr. Cheeks. It was released on October 16, 2001, through Universal Records. Production was handled by Mr. Sexxx, Stephen Marley, DJ Sage, Bink!, Caspa, Dejah, Easy Mo Bee, J.J. Brown, Mas, Rated R, Terence Dudley, and Mr. Cheeks himself. It features guest appearances from Stephen Marley, Big Gipp, Horace Brown and W. Walt.

The album debuted at number 32 on the Billboard 200 and number five on the Top R&B/Hip-Hop Albums chart in the United States. Its lead single "Lights, Camera, Action!" reached number 14 on the Billboard Hot 100 and topped the Hot R&B/Hip-Hop Songs chart. A follow-up single "Friday Night" made it only to number 87 on the Hot R&B/Hip-Hop Songs chart.

== Track listing ==
No.	Title	Writer(s)	Producer(s)	Length
1.	"Radio Intro"		Mr. Cheeks	0:53
2.	"Lights, Camera, Action!"	Leonard Caston; Anita Poree; Frank Wilson (musician); Terrance Kelly; Roosevelt Harrell	Bink!	4:21
3.	"Mama Say" (featuring Stephen Marley)	Kelly; Stephen Marley; David Saget	Stephen Marley; DJ Sage^{[c]}	5:02
4.	"Friday Night" (featuring Horace Brown)	Sylvester Levay; Stephan Prager; Kelly; Garfield Duncan; Horace Brown; Walter Susswell	Mr. Sexxx	5:25
5.	"Here We Come"	Kelly; Osten Harvey Jr.; Timothy Patterson	Easy Mo Bee	4:15
6.	"Bump Heads" (featuring Big Gipp)	Kelly; Duncan; Cameron Gipp	Mr. Sexxx	5:01
7.	"Worldwide Bouncin'"	Kelly; Duncan; Patterson	Mr. Sexxx	4:18
8.	"What the Fuck Is This?"	Kelly; Ted Hogan; Kenneth Payton	Caspa; Dejah	3:43
9.	"Till We Meet Again" (featuring Stephen Marley)	Kelly; Marley	Stephen Marley	5:42
10.	"I Remember"	Joan Armatrading; Kelly; Jason Brown	J.J. Brown	3:53
11.	"Let's Go"	Kelly; Ralphy Salas; Thomas Weisman	Rated R; Mas	3:50
12.	"Fuckin' With Walt"	Kelly; Terrance Dudley	Terance Dudley	1:20
13.	"Unanimous Decision"	Kelly; Saget; George Valdez	DJ Sage	2:59
14.	"Major"	Kelly; Duncan	Mr. Sexxx	4:41
Total length:				55:23

Notes

- ^{^[c]} signifies a co-producer.

Sample credits

- "Lights, Camera, Action!" contains elements from "Keep On Truckin'", written by Leonard Caston, Anita Poree, and Frank Wilson (musician); and performed by Eddie Kendricks.
- "Friday Night" contains elements from "Fly, Robin, Fly", written by Sylvester Levay and Stephan Prager, and performed by Silver Convention.
- "I Remember" contains elements from "Warm Love", written and performed by Joan Armatrading.

== Personnel ==
- Terrance "Mr. Cheeks" Kelly – vocals, producer (track 1), executive producer
- Stephen Marley – vocals & producer (tracks: 3, 9), keyboards (track 9)
- Horace Brown – vocals (track 4)
- Cameron "Big Gipp" Gipp – vocals (track 6)
- Tim "Buttnaked Tim Dawg" Patterson – backing vocals (track 7)
- Damian Marley – backing vocals (track 9)
- W. Walt – vocals (track 12)
- Christopher Meredith – bass (track 3)
- Julian Marley – keyboards (tracks: 3, 9), bass (track 9)
- D.J. Sage – programming & co-producer (track 3), producer (track 13)
- Steven "Stevie J" Jordan – programming (track 9)
- Roosevelt "Bink!" Harrell III – producer & recording (track 2)
- Garfield "Mr. Sexxx" Duncan – producer (tracks: 4, 6, 7, 14), recording & mixing (track 4), executive producer
- Osten "Easy Mo Bee" Harvey Jr. – producer (track 5)
- Ted "Caspa" Hogan – producer (track 8)
- Dejah – producer (track 8)
- Jason "J.J." Brown – producer (track 10)
- Ralphy "Rated R" Salas – producer (track 11)
- Thomas "Mas" Weisman – producer (track 11)
- Terence Quentin Dudley – producer (track 12)
- Leslie Brathwaite – recording & mixing (tracks: 1, 5–8, 10–14)
- Julio Ferrer – recording (tracks: 3, 9)
- Alrick Thompson – recording (tracks: 3, 9)
- Jim "Bonzai" Caruso – mixing (tracks: 3, 9)
- Dan Maier – engineering (track 10)
- Mark Goodchild – recording and mixing assistant (tracks: 1, 5–8, 10–14)
- Jason Tumminello – mixing assistant (track 9)
- James Cruz – mastering
- Charles Suitt – executive producer, management
- Sandy Brummels – art direction
- JSwift – design
- Nitin Vadukul – photography
- Charmaine Edwards – A&R
- Eloise Bryan – A&R
- Nina Freeman – A&R
- Todd Eleerby – management

== Charts ==
Chart (2001)	Peak position
US Billboard 200	32
US Top R&B/Hip-Hop Albums (Billboard)	5
