= 11-20-79 =

1996 studio album by Mona Lisa

Studio album by Mona Lisa
- Released: June 11, 1996
- Recorded: 1995–1996
- Genre: R&B, hip hop soul
- Length: 52:51
- Label: Island
- Producer: Hiriam Hicks (exec.), Tim "Dawg" Patterson (exec.), Bob Antoine, Stanley Brown, Andre Evans, Reese Johnson, Clark Kent, Benjamin Love, Mr. Sexxx, David "Redhead" Guppy, Joe Wilson

Singles from 11-20-79
- 1. "Can't Be Wasting My Time" Released: January 30, 1996; 2. "You Said" Released: June 4, 1996; 3. "Just Wanna Please U" Released: November 26, 1996

Professional ratings
Review scores
Source	Rating
AllMusic	4/5 stars

11-20-79 is the only studio album by American R&B singer Mona Lisa, released via Island on June 11, 1996 in North America. The album is named after her date of birth. It serves as the artist's only studio album as of 2024.

The album peaked at No. 38 on the Billboard Top R&B Albums chart.

== Track listing ==
No.	Title	Music	Length
1.	"Sweet Memories"	music: David Guppy; lyrics: Mona Lisa	4:35
2.	"Just Wanna Please U"	Bobby Caldwell, Rodolfo Franklin, Alfonis Kettner, Mona Lisa	4:20
3.	"Where I Wanna Be"	Garfield Duncan, Hubert Eaves III, Mona Lisa, Tim Patterson	3:49
4.	"Love U Enough"	Ali Shaheed Muhammad, Rachel Oden, Andre Robinson	4:06
5.	"I'm Not Your Girl"	Garfield Duncan, Mona Lisa, Tim Patterson	4:10
6.	"Keep Fallin'"	music: Reese Johnson; lyrics: Mona Lisa	4:34
7.	"You Said"	The Flex, Rachel Oden, Samuel Sapp	4:47
8.	"Mom Lude"		0:57
9.	"You Gave Me Love"	Rachel Oden, Darin Whittington	4:14
10.	"Crazy"	Darren Floyd, Rachel Oden, Andre Robinson	4:13
11.	"Can't Be Wasting My Time"	Bob Antoine, Johnta Austin, Duncan, Andre Evans, Lost Boyz, Tim Patterson	4:34
12.	"You Keep Leading Me On"	William Bryant, David Guppy, Daryl Marshall	4:29
13.	"Our Time to Shine"	David Guppy, Mona Lisa, Tim Patterson	4:03

== Charts ==
=== Album ===
Chart (1996)	Peak position
U.S. Heatseekers	15
U.S. R&B Albums	38

=== Singles ===
Year	Single	Peak chart positions		
Year	Single	U.S. Billboard Hot 100	U.S. Hot Dance Music/Maxi-Singles Sales	U.S. Hot R&B/Hip-Hop Singles & Tracks
1996	"Can't Be Wasting My Time"	65	12	20
1996	"You Said"	83	—	33
1996	"Just Wanna Please U"	—	—	65

"—" denotes releases that did not chart.

== Personnel ==
Information taken from Allmusic.

- assistant engineering – Won Allen, Chris Habeck, Mark Nixdorf, Max Vargus
- composing – G. Duncan, The Flex, Darren Floyd, D. Guppy, Reese Johnson, Tim "Dawg" Patterson, Darrin Whittington
- engineering – Mike Anzelowitz, Chris Barnett, Louis Christian, Jim Janik, Kenny Ortiz, Kieran Walsh
- executive production – Hiriam Hicks, Tim "Dawg" Patterson
- mastering – Herb Powers
- mixing – Chris Barnett, Louis Christian, Russell Elevado, Jim Janik, Kieran Walsh
- photography – Eric Johnson
- production – Bob Antoine, Stanley Brown, Clark Kent, Andre Evans, Reese Johnson, Benjamin Love, Mr. Sexxx, Tim "Dawg" Patterson, The Red Head, Joe Wilson
- vocal arranging – Ali Shaheed Muhammad, Rachel Oden, Trina Powell, Andre Robinson
