= Lifestyles of the Rich & Shameless =

Single by Lost Boyz

from the album Legal Drug Money
- Released: April 25, 1995
- Recorded: 1994
- Genre: Hip hop
- Length: 4:21
- Label: Uptown / MCA
- Songwriters: Terrance Kelly, Osten Harvey, Jr., Denzil Foster, Thomas McElroy, Jay A. King, Alexander Hill, Marcus Thompson, Michael Marshall
- Producer: Easy Mo Bee

Lost Boyz singles chronology
"Lifestyles of the Rich & Shameless" (1995)	"Jeeps, Lex Coups, Bimaz & Benz" (1995)

"Lifestyles of the Rich & Shameless" is the first single released from the Lost Boyz's debut album, Legal Drug Money. Easy Mo Bee produced the original version of the song, while Mr. Sexxx and Reese "Dat Nigga" Johnson each contributed their own remix to the song.

Released in early 1995, "Lifestyles of the Rich & Shameless" reached number 91 on the Billboard Hot 100 and number ten on the Billboard Hot Rap Singles chart.

== Single track listing ==
=== A-side ===
1. "Lifestyles of the Rich & Shameless" (LP Version)—4:23
2. "Lifestyles of the Rich & Shameless" (Mr. Sex Mix)—4:04

=== B-side ===
1. "Lifestyles of the Rich & Shameless" (Dat Nigga Mix)—4:34
2. "Jeeps, Lex Coups, Bimaz & Benz" (LP Version)—4:27

== Charts ==
Chart (1995)	Peak position
Billboard Hot 100	91
Billboard Hot R&B/Hip-Hop Singles & Tracks	60
Billboard Hot Rap Singles	10
Billboard Hot Dance Music/Maxi-Singles Sales	20
