= Jeeps, Lex Coups, Bimaz & Benz =

Single by Lost Boyz

from the album Legal Drug Money
- Released: August 22, 1995
- Recorded: 1995
- Genre: Hip hop
- Length: 4:32
- Label: Uptown / MCA
- Songwriter: Terrance Kelly
- Producer: Easy Mo Bee

Lost Boyz singles chronology
"Lifestyles of the Rich & Shameless" (1995)	"Jeeps, Lex Coups, Bimaz & Benz" (1995)	"Renee" (1996)

"Jeeps, Lex Coups, Bimaz & Benz" is a song by American hip hop group Lost Boyz, released in August 1995 by Uptown / MCA, as the second single from their debut album, Legal Drug Money (1996). The song was produced by Easy Mo Bee, who also had previously produced the group's first single, "Lifestyles of the Rich & Shameless". "Jeeps, Lex Coups, Bimaz & Benz" peaked at number 11 on the US Billboard Hot Rap Singles chart, and at numbers 56 and 67 on the Cash Box Top 100 and Billboard Hot 100 charts. Rapper Lil' Kim sampled the song on her 2003 single "The Jump Off".

== Single track listing ==
=== A-side ===
1. "Jeeps, Lex Coups, Bimaz & Benz" (LP Version) - 4:30
2. "Jeeps, Lex Coups, Bimaz & Benz" (Sparks Meets Dawg Mix) - 4:44

=== B-side ===
1. "Jeeps, Lex Coups, Bimaz & Benz" (Dat Nigga Mix) - 4:10
2. "Keep It Real" - 4:43

== Charts ==
Chart (1995–1996)	Peak position
US Billboard Hot 100	67
US Hot Dance Music/Maxi-Singles Sales (Billboard)	21
US Hot R&B/Hip-Hop Singles & Tracks (Billboard)	63
US Hot Rap Singles (Billboard)	11
US Cash Box Top 100	56
