= LB IV Life =

Studio album by Lost Boyz
- Released: September 28, 1999
- Recorded: 1998–99
- Studio: Heavy Hand Recordings (New York, NY); Soundtrack Studios (New York, NY)
- Genre: Hip hop
- Length: 65:13
- Label: Universal
- Producer: Alex Andino Jr.; Charles Suitt; DJ Rob; Dre Most; Dwayne Lindsey; Glenn S.O.N. Faide; "Pito" Jones; Ralph Lo; Ron G; Mr. Sexxx

Lost Boyz chronology
Love, Peace & Nappiness (1997)	LB IV Life (1999)	Lost Boyz Forever (2005)

Professional ratings
Review scores
Source	Rating
AllMusic	2.5/5 stars

LB IV Life is the third studio album by American hip hop group the Lost Boyz. It was released on September 28, 1999, via Universal Records. Recording sessions took place at Heavy Hand Recordings and Soundtrack in New York. Production was handled by Ralph Lo, Mr. Sex, DJ Rob, Dwayne Lindsey, Glenn S.O.N. Faide, Alex Andino Jr., Charles Suitt, Dre Most, Ron G and "Pito" Jones, with Dodie Walker and members Mr. Cheeks and Freaky Tah serving as executive producers. It features guest appearances from LG, Izzy Dead, J-N-J, QB, Queens Most Wanted, Street Connect and Bruce Miller. The album peaked at number 32 on the Billboard 200 and number eight the Top R&B/Hip-Hop Albums chart in the United States.

Member Freaky Tah was murdered on March 28, 1999, six months before the album was released, but makes multiple appearances on LB IV Life. Lead rapper Mr. Cheeks pursued a solo career after the release.

== Critical reception ==
Vibe praised the album's "sonic diversity", writing that Lost Boyz "successfully continue the club-rocking tradition" of previous albums.

== Track listing ==
No.	Title	Producer(s)	Length
1.	"Freaky Tah Intro"	Dwayne Lindsey	1:12
2.	"Let's Roll Dice"	Mr. Sex; Alex Andino Jr.^{[c]}	3:48
3.	"We Got the Hot Shit" (featuring LG)	Mr. Sex	3:56
4.	"Ghetto Jiggy"	Ralph Lo	5:28
5.	"Interlude"	Charles Suitt	0:46
6.	"Take a Hike (One)"	Dre Most	4:36
7.	"5 A.M." (featuring LG and QB)	Mr. Sex; Alex Andino Jr.	4:38
8.	"Risin' to the Top (No Stoppin' Us)"	Mr. Sex	4:34
9.	"Only Live Once" (featuring Street Connect and Izzy Dead)	Ralph Lo	4:15
10.	"Cheese"	DJ Rob	4:50
11.	"Radio Interlude" (featuring Bruce Miller)	Dwayne Lindsey	0:23
12.	"Plug Me In"	Ralph Lo; D2^{[c]}	4:38
13.	"New York City War Call"	Ron G	4:39
14.	"Can't Hold Us Down"	Ralph Lo	4:12
15.	"Colabo" (featuring Queens Most Wanted and J-N-J)	DJ Rob; "Pito" Jones	4:24
16.	"Ghetto Lifestyle"	Ralph Lo	4:14
17.	"LB Fam 4 Life"	Glenn S.O.N. Faide	4:04
18.	"Freaky Tah Outro"	Glenn S.O.N. Faide	1:26
Total length:			1:05:13

Notes

- ^{^[c]} signifies a co-producer.

== Personnel ==
- Terrance "Mr. Cheeks" Kelly – performer (tracks: 2–4, 6–10, 12–14, 16, 17), executive producer
- Raymond "Freaky Tah" Rogers – performer (tracks: 1, 2, 4, 6, 10, 18), executive producer
- Ronald "Spigg Nice" Blackwell – performer (track 1)
- L.G. – rap vocals (tracks: 3, 7)
- Mr. Hezekiah – backing vocals (tracks: 4, 8, 9)
- QB – rap vocals (track 7)
- Street Connect – rap vocals (track 9)
- Izzy Dead – rap vocals (track 9)
- Bruce Miller – vocals (track 11), mixing
- Mel – backing vocals (tracks: 12, 14)
- Queens Most Wanted – rap vocals (track 15)
- J-N-J – rap vocals (track 15)
- Robert Mann – guitar & bass (track 17)
- Dwayne "Whateva" Lindsey – producer (tracks: 1, 11)
- Garfield "Mr. Sexxx" Duncan – producer (tracks: 2, 3, 7, 8)
- Raphael "Ralph Lo" Boyd – producer (tracks: 4, 9, 12, 14, 16), recording
- Charles Suitt – producer (track 5)
- Dre Most – producer (track 6)
- Alex Andino Jr. – producer (track 7), co-producer (track 2)
- Robert "DJ Rob" Alphonse – producer (tracks: 10, 15)
- Ronald "Ron G" Bowser – producer (track 13)
- S. "Pito" Jones – producer (track 15)
- Glenn S.O.N. Faide – producer (tracks: 17, 18)
- D2 – co-producer (track 12)
- Chris Champion – mixing
- Dodie Walker – executive producer, management
- Richard Nelson – artwork
- Stephen McBride – photography
- Charmaine Edwards – A&R

== Charts ==
Chart (1999)	Peak position
US Billboard 200	32
US Top R&B Albums (Billboard)	8
