= Love, Peace & Nappiness =

Studio album by Lost Boyz
- Released: June 17, 1997
- Recorded: 1996–97
- Studio: Unique Recording (New York, NY); Honey Comb Hideout (Brooklyn, NY)
- Genre: Hip hop
- Length: 68:45
- Label: Universal
- Producer: Charles Suitt (also exec.); Bink!; "Buttnaked" Tim Dawg; DJ Rob; Easy Mo Bee; Glenn S.O.N. Faide; Ike Lee III; Mr. Sexxx; "Pito" Jones; Ron G; Terence Dudley

Lost Boyz chronology
Legal Drug Money (1996)	Love, Peace & Nappiness (1997)	LB IV Life (1999)

Singles from Love, Peace & Nappiness
- 1. "Me and My Crazy World" Released: May 2, 1997; 2. "Love, Peace & Nappiness" Released: 1997; 3. "What's Wrong" Released: 1998

Professional ratings
Review scores
Source	Rating
AllMusic	3/5 stars

Love, Peace & Nappiness is the second studio album by American hip hop group Lost Boyz. It was released on June 17, 1997, via Universal Records. Recording sessions took place at Unique Recording in New York and at Honey Comb Hideout in Brooklyn. Production was handled by Bink!, "Buttnaked" Tim Dawg, Glenn S.O.N. Faide, Mr. Sexxx, Ron G, Terence Dudley, DJ Rob, Easy Mo Bee, Ike Lee III, "Pito" Jones, and Charles Suitt, who also served as executive producer. It features guest appearances from A+, Canibus, Queens Most Wanted, Da Black Pharaoh, King Keiwanee, Lovebug Starski, Redman and Aarian Pope. The album peaked at number nine on the Billboard 200 and number two the Top R&B/Hip Hop Albums chart in the United States. It was certified Gold by the Recording Industry Association of America on September 17, 1997. Its lead single "Me and My Crazy World" reached number 52 on the Billboard Hot 100.

== Critical reception ==
The Washington Post wrote that "chief rappers Mr. Cheeks and Freaky Tah have the Lost Boyz formula down pat, combining live instrumentation—which provides for warmer grooves—with smoothly sung choruses for an even more radio-friendly vibe".

== Track listing ==
No.	Title	Writer(s)	Producer(s)	Length
1.	"Intro"	Terrance Kelly; Raymond Rogers; Roosevelt Harrell III; Charles Suitt; E. Ruth; R. Blackwell	Bink!; Charles Suitt^{[c]}	1:20
2.	"Summer Time"	Kelly; Rogers; Tim Patterson; Terence Dudley; Dexter Archer; D. Warren; Dana Manno; Lowell Dunbar; Robbie Shakespeare	"Buttnaked" Tim Dawg; Terence Dudley; Big Dex^{[o]}	4:18
3.	"Me and My Crazy World"	Kelly; Ron Bowser	Ron G	5:11
4.	"Beasts from the East" (featuring A+, Redman and Canibus)	Kelly; Reggie Noble; Germaine Williams; Harrell III; Robert James	Bink!	5:34
5.	"Love, Peace & Nappiness" (featuring King Keiwanee and Da Black Pharaoh)	Kelly; Keiwanee Powell; Umoja Powell; Garfield Duncan; Richard Walters	Mr. Sex	4:18
6.	"Black Hoodies (Interlude)" (featuring Aarian Pope)	Aarian Pope	Charles Suitt	0:48
7.	"So Love"	Kelly; Ike Lee III; Samuel Jones	Ike Lee III	4:32
8.	"My Crew" (featuring A+ and Canibus)	Kelly; Williams; Osten S. Harvey Jr.	Easy Mo Bee	5:00
9.	"What's Wrong"	Kelly; Patterson; Dudley; Stephanie Andrews; Steveland Morris	"Buttnaked" Tim Dawg; Terence Dudley	4:10
10.	"Certain Things We Do"	Kelly; Bowser	Ron G	4:29
11.	"Games" (featuring Lovebug Starski)	Kelly; Duncan	Mr. Sex	4:27
12.	"Get Your Hustle On"	Rogers; Glenn Faide; Robert Alphonse; S. "Pito" Jones; William Collins; George Clinton III; Joe Harris; Lafayette Stone	Glenn S.O.N. Faide; DJ Rob; "Pito" Jones	4:03
13.	"Tight Situations" (featuring Queens Most Wanted)	Kelly; Harrell III	Bink!	5:27
14.	"Day 1"	Kelly; Harrell III	Bink!	5:14
15.	"Why"	Kelly; Rogers; Faide; Suitt	Glenn S.O.N. Faide; Charles Suitt	4:43
16.	"From My Family to Yours (Dedication)" (featuring Queens Most Wanted)	Kelly; Harrell III	Bink!	5:11
Total length:				68:45

Notes

- ^{^[c]} signifies a co-producer.
- ^{^[o]} signifies an original producer.

== Personnel ==
- Terrance "Mr. Cheeks" Kelly – vocals (tracks: 2–5, 7–11, 13–16)
- Raymond "Freaky Tah" Rogers – vocals (tracks: 2, 3, 5, 9, 10, 12–16)
- Andre "A+" Levins – vocals (tracks: 4, 8)
- Germaine "Canibus" Williams – vocals (tracks: 4, 8), management
- Reginald "Redman" Noble – vocals (track 4)
- "King Keiwanee" Powell – vocals (track 5)
- Umoja "Da Black Pharaoh" Powell – vocals (track 5)
- Aarian Pope – vocals (track 6)
- Kevin "Lovebug Starski" Smith – vocals (track 11)
- Queens Most Wanted – vocals (tracks: 13, 16)
- Robert "Storm" Jordan – backing vocals (track 3)
- Avon Marshall – keyboards (tracks: 3, 10)
- Stanley Brown – keyboards (tracks: 5, 14)
- Tony Prendatt – instruments (track 11)
- Alex Andino Jr. – guitar & bass (track 13), management
- Roosevelt "Bink!" Harrell III – drums (tracks: 13, 14), producer (tracks: 1, 4, 13, 14, 16), programming (tracks: 1, 4)
- Tim "Buttnaked Tim Dawg" Patterson – producer (tracks: 2, 9)
- Terence Quentin Dudley – producer & recording (tracks: 2, 9), mixing (track 2)
- Ronald "Ron G" Bowser – producer & programming (tracks: 3, 10)
- Garfield "Mr. Sexxx" Duncan – producer & programming (tracks: 5, 11), A&R
- Charles Suitt – producer (tracks: 6, 15), co-producer (track 1), executive producer, A&R, management
- Ike Lee III – producer & programming (track 7)
- Osten "Easy Mo Bee" Harvey Jr. – producer (track 8)
- Glenn S.O.N. Faide – producer (tracks: 12, 15), programming (track 15)
- Robert "DJ Rob" Alphonse – producer & programming (track 12)
- S. "Pito" Jones – producer (track 12)
- Dexter "Big Dex" Archer – original producer (track 2)
- Ed Miller – recording (tracks: 1, 3–8, 10–16)
- Kenny Ortiz – mixing (tracks: 1, 3–16)
- Rawle Gittens – mixing (tracks: 2)
- Michael Sarsfield – mastering
- Sandie Lee Drake – art direction
- Susan Bibeau – design
- Danny Clinch – photography
- Kathy Baylor – A&R
- Todd Ellerby – management
- Lisa Lindo – stylist

== Charts ==
=== Weekly charts ===
Chart (1997)	Peak position
US Billboard 200	9
US Top R&B/Hip-Hop Albums (Billboard)	2

=== Year-end charts ===
Chart (1997)	Position
US Billboard 200	189
US Top R&B/Hip-Hop Albums (Billboard)	56

Singles chart positions

Year	Song	Chart positions			
Year	Song	Billboard Hot 100	Hot R&B/Hip-Hop Singles & Tracks	Hot Rap Singles	Hot Dance Music/Maxi-Singles Sales
1997	"Me & My Crazy World"	#52	#23	#5	#17

== Certifications ==
Region	Certification	Certified units/sales
United States (RIAA)	Gold	500,000^{^}
^{^} Shipments figures based on certification alone.
