= Mona Lisa (singer) =

American singer-songwriter (born 1979)

- Born: Kimberly Leadbetter; November 20, 1979 (age 46); Union, South Carolina, U.S.
- Origin: Yonkers, New York
- Genres: R&B, soul, hip hop soul
- Occupations: Singer-songwriter, actress
- Instruments: Vocals, keyboards, piano, guitar
- Years active: 1995–present
- Labels: Island Records; Ontourage Entertainment

Kimberly Leadbetter (born November 20, 1979), known professionally as Mona Lisa, is an American pop and R&B singer-songwriter, actress, model, and record producer. She is best known for her debut single "Can't Be Wasting My Time" featuring the hip hop group Lost Boyz, which was featured on the Don't Be a Menace to South Central While Drinking Your Juice in the Hood soundtrack which went gold, as well as her debut album 11-20-79.

11-20-79 was released when she was 16. Tallahassee Democrat's Maisha Maurant says of it "Mona Lisa has their style down but lacks the punch, in part because of lackluster material and production." Sophie Lazin of The Morning Call says Mona Lisa is "given material that's just plain corny. And that's an old story." Jerry McCormick in the State gave it 2 1/2 stars and writes "Yonkers, N.Y.-native Mona Lisa hopes to show the R&B and hip-hop world that there is room for another sultry teen singer in addition to Brandy and Monica." Al Lagattolla in the Northwest Herald also gave it 2 1/2 stars. He says "Mona Lisa is a little more than a pretty face who can sing. She sings well. The stuff just is not overpowering. The material is a little older than 16, but probably right on for this decade. Seductive overtones are not out of line for today's average teenagers. The trouble is it never to looks to go anywhere above average." Joseph Blake in Times Colonist praised the album writing "Her songs move effortlessly from hip hop-influenced grooves to older soul ballad styles. She's somethin' special." Ray Marcano in Dayton Daily News gave it 1 star finishing "11-20-79 gives you droll, listless material that moves along at the pace of a tractor chugging down a country road. Much like this album, you just can't wait for the journey to be over."

In 2011, her collaboration with labelmate DL, "First Klass (That Lyfe)" was released as a digital single. It's the lead single for the King of Paper Chasin' soundtrack. Her song, "Once Upon a Time" (written by Dennis Cooper) appeared in the film, The Heart Specialist which was released in 2012.

== Discography ==
=== Albums ===
- 1996: 11-20-79
- 1998: Get'n It On
- 2006: Reckless

=== Singles ===
- 1996 – "Can't Be Wasting My Time" (featuring Lost Boyz)
- 1996 – "You Said"
- 1996 – "Our Time to Shine" (with Lil' Kim ("Don't Be a Menace..." soundtrack)
- 1997 – "Just Wanna Please U" (featuring The LOX)
- 1998 – "Peach"
- 2004 – "Girls" (with Cam'Ron)
- 2007 – "Get At Me" (with Sonja Blade)
- 2008 - "We Can Fly"(from reckless album)
- 2011 – "First Klass (That Lyfe)" (with DL) ("King of Paper Chasin'" soundtrack)

=== Other appearances ===
- 1996 – "Our Time To Shine (Remix)" (with Lil' Kim) "Don't Be A Menace..." Soundtrack (chorus/background)
- 1996 – "Music Makes Me High" (Lost Boyz "Legal Drug Money" album (chorus/background, uncredited)
- 1996 – "Renee" Lost Boyz ("Renee" alternate side Ep Single, chorus/background uncredited)
- 1997 – "Silent Night" ("A Special Gift" compilation)
- 1997 – "Somehow" (with Voices of Theory & Kurupt)
- 1998 – "Get'n It On" ("Woo" soundtrack)
- 2001 – "Fever" (DJ Famous mixtape 15: R&B is Needed)
- 2009 – "Thug Love" (Head Crack "Handle My Business" album)
- 2012 – "Once Upon a Life" ("The Heart Specialist" soundtrack)

== Videography ==
Year	Song	Director
1995	"Can't Be Wasting My Time (One Dread One Ball Head Version featuring Lost Boyz)"	Brian Luvar
1996	"Our Time To Shine (Remix)" (Lil' Kim and Mona Lisa)	Lance "Un" Rivera
1996	"You Said"	Paul Hunter
1997	"Just Wanna Please U (Stevie J. Version featuring The LOX)"	Diane Martel
1997	"Somehow" (Voices of Theory featuring Mona Lisa & Kurupt)	–
1998	"Peach"	Ron Norsworthy
