= Mr. Cheeks =

American rapper (born 1971)

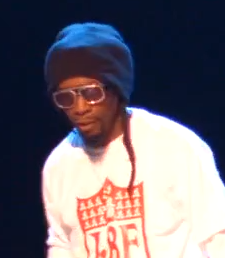

Background information
- Born: Terrance Cocheeks Kelly; March 28, 1971 (age 55); Queens, New York City, U.S.
- Genres: Hip hop
- Occupation: Rapper
- Years active: 1991–present
- Labels: Universal, Diane's Boy
- Member of: Lost Boyz

Terrance Cocheeks Kelly (born March 28, 1971), known professionally as Mr. Cheeks, is an American rapper. He is best known for his 2001 single "Lights, Camera, Action!" (featuring Missy Elliott, P. Diddy and Petey Pablo), which peaked at number 14 on the Billboard Hot 100. Prior, he performed as a member of the hip hop group Lost Boyz from 1995 to 1999, and thereafter signed with Universal Records to pursue a solo career.

"Lights, Camera, Action!" preceded the release of his debut studio album John P. Kelly (2001), which was met with moderate critical and commercial reception along with its follow up, Back Again! (2003). He is also known for guest appearance on Lil' Kim's 2003 single "The Jump Off," which peaked at number 17 on the Billboard Hot 100.

== Biography ==
=== 1991–2019: Lost Boyz ===
Mr. Cheeks, who was mentored by his uncle Gil Scott-Heron, along with bandmates Freaky Tah (1971–1999), Spigg Nice and Pretty Lou made up Lost Boyz. The Lost Boyz practiced a sincere, literate, non-sensational style of New York hip-hop and produced a number of singles including; "Lifestyles of the Rich and Shameless" (1994), "Jeeps, Lex Coups, Bimaz & Benz" (1995) and "Renee" (1996). Lost Boyz gained worldwide critical acclaim following the release of the albums; Legal Drug Money in 1996, Love, Peace & Nappiness in 1997, LB IV Life in 1999, LB Next Generation in 2019 and Legacy in 2020.

=== 2001–09: Solo career ===
Mr. Cheeks became a solo artist in 2001. His debut solo album, John P. Kelly, named for both his cousin and his grandfather, featured the hit single "Lights, Camera, Action!". The album also included a collaboration with longtime friend and business partner, Stephen Marley, (son of reggae artist Bob Marley) featuring the ballad "Till We Meet Again" (recorded in Freaky Tah's memory) and the reggae-flavored "Mama Say". In 2003, Mr. Cheeks released the follow-up album, Back Again! The single off the album was "Crush On You" and it featured Mario Winans. In the fall of 2003, Cheeks separated from Universal, forming his own label, Diane's Boyz. Cheeks was also featured on Lil' Kim's single, "The Jump Off."

== Discography ==
=== Solo albums ===
- John P. Kelly (2001)
- Back Again! (2003)
- Ladies and Ghettomen (2004)
- Raised (2015)

=== with Lost Boyz ===
- Legal Drug Money (1996)
- Love, Peace & Nappiness (1997)
- LB IV Life (1999)
- Next Generation (2019)
- Legacy (2020)

=== Singles ===
==== As lead artist ====
List of singles as a lead artist, with selected chart positions, showing year released and album name
Title	Year	Peak chart positions				Album
Title	Year	US	US R&B	US Rap	US Rhyth.	Album
"Lights, Camera, Action!"	2001	14	1	1	25	John P. Kelly
"Friday Night" (featuring Horace Brown)	2002	—	87	16	—	John P. Kelly
"Crush on You" (featuring Mario Winans)	2003	—	52	—	—	Back Again!
"What We Do"	2006	—	—	—	—	Non-album single
"The Ryan Show Theme Song" (featuring Hamptons Dave and Ryan Verneuille)	2020	—	—	—	—	Non-album single
"—" denotes a recording that did not chart.

==== As featured artist ====
List of singles as a featured artist, with selected chart positions, showing year released and album name
Title	Year	Peak chart positions										Album
Title	Year	US	US R&B	US Rap	US Rhyth.	AUS	BEL (FL)	GER	ITA	NLD	UK	Album
"The Jump Off" (Lil' Kim featuring Mr. Cheeks)	2003	17	8	7	8	59	27	78	20	83	16	La Bella Mafia
