= Lost Boyz =

American hip hop group

- Lost Boyz in 1996; Left to right: Freaky Tah, Pretty Lou, DJ Spigg Nice, Mr. Cheeks

Background information
- Origin: Queens, New York City, U.S.
- Genre: Hip hop
- Works: Lost Boyz discography
- Years active: 1993–1999; 2010–present
- Labels: Uptown; Universal
- Members: Mr. Cheeks; Pretty Lou; DJ Spigg Nice; Freaky Kah
- Past members: Freaky Tah

Lost Boyz are an American hip hop group from Queens, New York, consisting of MC Mr. Cheeks, DJ Spigg Nice, Pretty Lou, and Freaky Tah,. The original line-up released two albums: Legal Drug Money (1996) and Love, Peace & Nappiness (1997). The third album, LB IV Life (1999), was finished by the three remaining group members. In the following years, Mr. Cheeks focused on his solo career, reuniting with the rest of the group for their fourth album, Grand Scheme 12:26 (2020).

== History ==
The Lost Boyz began as a street crew in South Jamaica, Queens in 1987. Mr Cheeks (known as CO-CHEEKS) and Freaky Tah were locally known as freestyle artists along with Fredro Starr (ONYX) & Mikey D (Main Source) during the "Park Jam Era" (Tapemaster B, CuttMaster Jt, Grandmaster Vic). Mr Cheeks would take this time to perfect his battle rapping skill in the park & also gain his stage name from the Supreme Team leader, Black Just. With Pretty Lou and Spigg Nice, the group would come together and promote under the Lost Boyz name.

In 1995, the group released their debut single "Lifestyles of the Rich & Shameless," charting on the Billboard Hot 100. The release landed them a record deal with Uptown Records. They contributed a single to the Don't Be a Menace to South Central While Drinking Your Juice in the Hood soundtrack, titled "Renee". The song became a major hit, breaking into the top 40 on the Hot 100 chart. The single also reached gold status in 1996. On June 4, 1996, the group released their debut album Legal Drug Money to acclaim, and featured five Hot 100 hits, including their past singles "Lifestyles of the Rich & Shameless," "Renee," "Music Makes Me High," "Jeeps, Lex Coups, Bimaz & Benz," and "Get Up." The album was certified Gold by the RIAA in late 1996.

In 1996, the group appeared on the Red Hot Organization's compilation CD America Is Dying Slowly, alongside Wu-Tang Clan, Coolio, and Fat Joe, among others. The CD, meant to raise awareness of the AIDS epidemic among African-American men, was heralded as a "masterpiece" by The Source magazine.

Their second album, Love, Peace & Nappiness, was released on June 17, 1997, through Uptown/Universal Records. It featured another Hot 100 single, "Me & My Crazy World." One of the most famous songs on the album was the posse cut "Beasts from the East", featuring A+, Redman, and Canibus. The album was not as acclaimed as their debut, but fared well commercially, reaching Gold status in late 1997.

Freaky Tah was murdered in Queens on March 28, 1999, at the age of 27, putting him in the infamous "27 Club", which is a group of musicians who died at the age of 27. The three remaining group members finished their third album, LB IV Life, released in September 1999, but the album was not a commercial or artistic success, and Mr. Cheeks left to begin a solo career. On January 16, 2004, Spigg Nice was tried and convicted of multiple bank robberies in New Jersey and was sentenced to 37 years in prison. He was released in 2021, the same year the group appeared on Nick Cannon's Wild 'N Out show on VH1.

== Members ==
- Mr. Cheeks
- Freaky Tah
- Pretty Lou
- DJ Spigg Nice

== Discography ==
- Legal Drug Money (1996)
- Love, Peace & Nappiness (1997)
- LB IV Life (1999)
- Grand Scheme 12:26 (2020)
- Lost Boyz Legacy (Deluxe Edition) (2020)
