= Heavy D discography =

- Studio albums: 7
- Compilation albums: 2
- Singles: 14

The discography of Heavy D consists of eight studio albums, two compilation albums and 14 singles.

== Studio albums ==
List of albums, with selected chart positions
Title	Album details	Peak chart positions				Certifications
Title	Album details	US	US R&B	NL	UK	Certifications
Living Large	Released: October 25, 1987; Label: Uptown; Format: CD, CS	92	10	—	—	
Big Tyme	Released: June 12, 1989; Label: Uptown, MCA; Format: CD, CS, LP	19	1	—	—	RIAA: Platinum
Peaceful Journey	Released: July 2, 1991; Label: Uptown, MCA; Format: CD, CS, LP	21	5	47	40	RIAA: Platinum
Blue Funk	Released: December 22, 1992; Label: Uptown; Format: CD	40	7	90	—	RIAA: Gold
Nuttin' But Love	Released: May 25, 1994; Label: Uptown; Format: CD, CS, LP	11	1	—	—	RIAA: Platinum
Waterbed Hev	Released: April 22, 1997; Label: Uptown, Universal; Format: CD, CS, LP	9	3	—	—	RIAA: Gold
Heavy	Released: July 15, 1999; Label: Uptown, Universal; Format: CD	60	10	—	—	
Vibes	Released: December 16, 2008; Label: Stride, Fontana; Format: CD, digital download	—	—	—	—	
Love Opus	Released: September 27, 2011; Label: Stride; Format: Music download	—	75	—	—	
"—" denotes a recording that did not chart or was not released in that territory.

== Compilations ==
List of compilation albums
Title	Album details
Heavy Hitz	Released: September 12, 2000; Label: MCA
20th Century Masters – The Millennium Collection: The Best of Heavy D & The Boyz	Released: September 10, 2002; Label: MCA

== Singles ==
List of singles, with selected chart positions
Title	Year	Peak chart positions														Certifications	Album
Title	Year	US R&B	US	AUS	AUT	BEL (FL)	FRA	GER	IRE	NLD	NOR	NZ	SWE	SWI	UK	Certifications	Album
"Mr. Big Stuff"	1986	60	—	—	—	—	—	—	—	—	—	—	—	—	61		Living Large
"We Got Our Own Thang"	1989	10	—	—	—	37	—	—	—	15	—	—	—	—	69		Big Tyme
"Somebody for Me"	1989	8	—	—	—	—	—	—	—	—	—	—	—	—	—		Big Tyme
"Gyrlz, They Love Me"	1990	12	—	—	—	—	—	—	—	—	—	—	—	—	—		Big Tyme
"Big Tyme"	1990	—	—	—	—	—	—	—	—	—	—	—	—	—	—		Big Tyme
"Is It Good to You"	1991	13	32	76	—	26	—	—	—	32	—	23	—	—	46		Peaceful Journey
"Now That We Found Love"	1991	5	11	6	8	5	39	4	6	2	6	10	2	4	2	RIAA: Gold	Peaceful Journey
"Don't Curse"	1992	—	—	—	—	—	—	—	—	—	—	—	—	—	—		Peaceful Journey
"Truthful"	1993	57	—	—	—	—	—	—	—	—	—	—	—	—	—		Blue Funk
"Who's the Man"	1993	—	—	—	—	—	—	—	—	—	—	—	—	—	—		Blue Funk / Who's the Man (soundtrack)
"Got Me Waiting"	1994	3	20	—	—	—	—	—	—	—	—	—	—	—	—		Nuttin' But Love
"Nuttin' but Love"	1994	18	40	—	—	—	—	—	—	—	—	—	—	—	—		Nuttin' But Love
"Black Coffee"	1994	15	57	—	—	—	—	—	—	—	—	—	—	—	—		Nuttin' But Love
"This Is Your Night"	1994	—	—	—	—	24	14	—	—	17	—	—	—	—	30		Nuttin' But Love
"Big Daddy"	1997	5	18	—	—	—	—	—	—	—	—	45	—	—	—	RIAA: Gold	Waterbed Hev
"I'll Do Anything"	1997	—	—	—	—	—	—	—	—	—	—	—	—	—	—		Waterbed Hev
"Don't Stop"	1999	—	—	—	—	—	—	—	—	—	—	—	—	—	—		Heavy
"On Point"	1999	—	—	—	—	—	—	—	—	—	—	—	—	—	—		Heavy
"Long Distance Girlfriend"	2008	—	—	—	—	—	—	—	—	—	—	—	—	—	—		Vibes
"No Matter What"	2009	—	—	—	—	—	—	—	—	—	—	—	—	—	—		Vibes
"Put It All On Me"	2011	—	—	—	—	—	—	—	—	—	—	—	—	—	—		Love Opus

=== As featured artist ===
List of singles, with selected chart positions
Title	Year	Peak chart positions									Album
Title	Year	US	AUS	AUT	FRE	NL	NZ	SWE	SWI	UK	Album
"Self-Destruction" (Stop the Violence Movement)	1989										Self Destruction 12"
"Alright (Remix)" (Janet Jackson featuring Heavy D)	1990	4	100	—	—	—	28	—	—	20	Alright 12"
Do Me Right (Guy featuring Heavy D)	1990										The Future
"Jam" (Michael Jackson featuring Heavy D)	1992	26	11	22	8	12	2	30	22	13	Dangerous
"Dem No Worry We" (Super Cat featuring Heavy D)	1992										Don Dada
Respect Is Due (Daddy Freddy featuring Heavy D)	1992										Now or Never
"Roll wit the Flava" (Flavor Unit MCs)	1993										Roll wit the Flava
"Candy Rain" (Remix) (Soul for Real featuring Heavy D)	1995	2	—	—	—	—	—	—	—	—	Candy Rain 12"
"I Miss You (Come Back Home)" (Monifah featuring Heavy D)	1995										New York Undercover (soundtrack) / Moods...Moments
"Criminal Mind" (Tyrese featuring Heavy D)	1999	—	—	—	—	—	—	—	—	—	Blue Streak (soundtrack)

=== Guest appearances ===
Title	Year	Album	With
We Write the Songs	1988	In Control, Volume 1	Marley Marl, Biz Markie
Just Coolin'	1988	Just Coolin'	LeVert
Ram Dance Hall Session	1989	The Desolate One	Just-Ice
Let the People Sing	1991	Strictly Business (soundtrack)	—N/a
Fools in Love	1991	In Control Volume II (For Your Steering Pleasure)	Marley Marl, Eclipse
Big and Ready	1992	Don Dada	Super Cat
The Basement	1992	Mecca and the Soul Brother	Pete Rock & CL Smooth, Grap Luva, Rob-O
Ready for Dem	1993	19 Naughty III	Naughty by Nature
Hotness	1993	Who's the Man? (soundtrack)	Buju Banton
Rough...	1993	Black Reign	Queen Latifah, KRS-One, Treach, Tony Dofat
My Love	1993	What's the 411? Remix	Mary J. Blige
Jam Session	1994	NBA Jam Session	The Notorious B.I.G., Troo-Kula
Let's Get It On	1994	Let's Get It On!	Eddie F, Tupac Shakur, The Notorious B.I.G., Grand Puba, Spunk
Check It Out	1995	New Jersey Drive, Vol. 1	—N/a
Rock with You	1995	Q's Jook Joint	Quincy Jones, Brandy
You Just Don't Know	1996	For Life	Soul for Real
Need Your Love	1997	Timeless	Big Bub, Queen Latifah
Keep It Coming	1997	Deuces Wild	B. B. King
Take a Ride	1998	Woo (soundtrack)	Herb McGruff
Massive (Hold Tight)	1998	Soul Survivor	Pete Rock, Beenie Man
