= Good Life: The Best of Pete Rock & CL Smooth =

Greatest hits album by Pete Rock & CL Smooth
- Released: June 10, 2003
- Recorded: 1991–98
- Genre: Hip hop
- Label: Elektra/Rhino/Atlantic Records; 73863
- Producer: Pete Rock

Pete Rock & CL Smooth chronology
The Main Ingredient (1994)	Good Life: The Best of Pete Rock & CL Smooth (2003)

Professional ratings
Review scores
Source	Rating
Allmusic	4.5/5 stars
Robert Christgau	A−

One in a Million
From the original motion picture soundtrack Poetic Justice

Good Life is a compilation of songs by golden age hip hop group Pete Rock & CL Smooth. It contains singles and highlights from their two full-length albums and one EP, as well as leftover songs from soundtracks. It also contains the Pete Rock single "Take Your Time", one of the only songs by the duo that doesn't feature a performance by CL Smooth.

"One in a Million" was recorded for the soundtrack to the film Poetic Justice. The song contains a mix of jazzy-horns over a sumptuous baseline, with a chorus sung by CL Smooth, and scratches and cuts by Pete Rock. The song contains a sample from Brother Jack McDuff's "Electric SurfBoard".

== Track listing ==
All songs produced by Pete Rock & CL Smooth, except for "Lots of Lovin'" which contains additional production by Nevelle Hodge.

#	Title	Time	Songwriters	Performers	Original Album
1	"Lots Of Lovin'"	4:46	Peter Phillips; Corey Penn; Nevelle Hodge	CL Smooth	Mecca and the Soul Brother
2	"Straighten It Out"	4:13	Peter Phillips; Corey Penn	CL Smooth	Mecca and the Soul Brother
3	"Anger In The Nation"	5:33	Peter Phillips; Corey Penn; Adofo Abdullah Muhammad	CL Smooth	Mecca and the Soul Brother
4	"They Reminisce Over You (T.R.O.Y.)"	4:46	Peter Phillips; Corey Penn	CL Smooth; Pete Rock	Mecca and the Soul Brother
5	"Skinz"	4:15	Peter Phillips; Corey Penn; Maxwell Dixon	Pete Rock; CL Smooth; Grand Puba	Mecca and the Soul Brother
6	"Take You There"	4:45	Peter Phillips; Corey Penn; Keni Burke; Alan Felder; Norma Jean Wright	Pete Rock; CL Smooth	The Main Ingredient
7	"The Creator"	4:44	Peter Phillips; Maxwell Dixon	Pete Rock	All Souled Out
8	"Mecca & The Soul Brother"	5:59	Peter Phillips; Corey Penn	Pete Rock; CL Smooth	All Souled Out
9	"It's Not A Game"	4:22	Peter Phillips; Corey Penn	CL Smooth	"It's Not a Game" promo single
10	"I Got A Love"	5:11	Peter Phillips; Corey Penn; David Lewis	CL Smooth	The Main Ingredient
11	"All The Places"	5:41	Peter Phillips; Corey Penn; Larry Mizell; Fonce Mizell	CL Smooth	The Main Ingredient
12	"Searching"	5:06	Peter Phillips; Corey Penn	CL Smooth	The Main Ingredient
13	"Good Life"	3:53	Peter Phillips; Corey Penn	CL Smooth	All Souled Out
14	"One In A Million"	4:04	Peter Phillips; Corey Penn; Jack McDuff	CL Smooth; Pete Rock	Poetic Justice (Music from the Motion Picture)
15	"Death Becomes You"	4:13	Peter Phillips; Corey Penn; Tommy Guest	CL Smooth; YG'z; Pete Rock	Menace II Society (The Original Motion Picture Soundtrack)
16	"Take Your Time"	4:31	Peter Phillips; Carl McIntosh; Jane Eugene	Pete Rock; Loose Ends	Soul Survivor
