= Heavy Hitz =

Compilation album by Heavy D & the Boyz
- Released: September 12, 2000
- Recorded: 1999
- Genre: Hip hop
- Label: MCA
- Producer: DJ Eddie F Teddy Riley; Marley Marl; Al B. Sure!

Heavy D & the Boyz chronology
Heavy (1999)	Heavy Hitz (2000)	The Best of Heavy D & the Boyz (2002)

Professional ratings
Review scores
Source	Rating
Allmusic	4.5/5 stars

Heavy Hitz is the first compilation album and sixth album overall by rap group, Heavy D & the Boyz. The album was released on September 12, 2000 for MCA Records and was produced by Heavy D, DJ Eddie F, Teddy Riley, Marley Marl, Al B. Sure!, Pete Rock, Easy Mo Bee and Erick Sermon.

== Track listing ==
1. "The Overweight Lovers in the House"- 3:37
2. "Mr. Big Stuff"- 3:24
3. "Don't You Know"- 4:21
4. "We Got Our Own Thang"- 3:49
5. "Somebody for Me"- 4:56
6. "Gyrlz, They Love Me"- 5:02
7. "Now That We Found Love"- 4:17
8. "Is It Good to You"- 4:52
9. "You Can't See What I Can See"- 3:46
10. "Got Me Waiting"- 4:31
11. "Nuttin' But Love"- 3:33
12. "Black Coffee"- 4:28
13. "Big Daddy"- 3:54
14. "On Point"- 4:39
15. "Just Coolin'"- 4:57
