= American Me (album) =

Studio album by CL Smooth
- Released: October 31, 2006
- Genre: Hip-hop
- Length: 54:24
- Label: Shaman Work
- Producer: Deleterio; Don Joe; KayGee; Mike Loe; Pete Rock; Rsonist; Squarta; Tramp Baby

CL Smooth chronology
The Main Ingredient (1994)	American Me (2006)	The Outsider (2007)

Professional ratings
Review scores
Source	Rating
AllHipHop	3.5/5 stars
HipHopDX	3.5/5
RapReviews	6.5/10
XXL	L (3/5)

American Me is the debut solo studio album by American rapper CL Smooth. It was released on October 31, 2006 via Shaman Work Recordings. Production was handled by Mike Loe, KayGee, Rsonist, Tramp Baby, Deleterio, Don Joe, Pete Rock and Squarta.

The album was supported by three singles: "It's a Love Thing", "Warm Outside" b/w "I Can't Help It" and "American Me". The song "It's a Love Thing" was previously released as a single b/w "Appreciate" from Pete Rock's 2004 studio album Soul Survivor II, and peaked at number 34 on the UK Hip Hop and R&B Singles Chart.

== Track listing ==
No.	Title	Writer(s)	Producer(s)	Length
1.	"American Me Intro"	Corey Penn; Michael Warren	Mike Loe	2:16
2.	"American Me"	Penn; Gregory Green	Rsonist	4:05
3.	"I Can't Help It"	Penn; Warren; Corin Paul Thomas Dingley	Mike Loe	3:45
4.	"Call on Me"	Penn; Terence Abney; Dingley	KayGee; Tramp Baby	3:52
5.	"Black Heart Radio Interlude"	Penn; Dingley	Mike Loe	0:51
6.	"CL Smooth Unplugged"	Penn; Dingley	Squarta	4:11
7.	"Warm Outside"	Penn; Green	Rsonist	3:52
8.	"Terrorism Interlude"	Penn	Deleterio; Don Joe	1:23
9.	"Gorilla Pimpin"	Penn; Keir Gist; Abney	KayGee; Tramp Baby	4:24
10.	"The Impossible"	Penn; Dingley	Mike Loe	3:59
11.	"It's a Love Thing"	Penn; Peter Phillips	Pete Rock	4:50
12.	"Smoke in the Air"	Penn; Dingley	Mike Loe	3:23
13.	"Travel Sometime Interlude"	Penn; Dingley		0:28
14.	"The Stroll"	Penn; Green	Rsonist	3:58
15.	"American Me Outro"	Penn; Dingley	Mike Loe	2:03
16.	"All We Ever Know"	Penn; Warren; Dingley	Mike Loe	3:50
17.	"Heaven Is Watching You"	Penn; Gist; Abney	KayGee; Tramp Baby	3:14
Total length:				54:24
