= I Got a Love =

Single by Pete Rock & CL Smooth

from the album The Main Ingredient
- Released: September 1994
- Recorded: 1994
- Genre: Hip hop
- Length: 4:57
- Label: Elektra
- Songwriters: Pete Rock & CL Smooth
- Producer: Pete Rock

Pete Rock & CL Smooth singles chronology
"One in a Million" (1993)	"I Got a Love" (1994)	"Take You There" (1994)

I Got a Love
From the album The Main Ingredient

"I Got a Love" is the first single from Pete Rock & CL Smooth's second album, The Main Ingredient, released in 1994. The song is a horn and guitar-driven love-jam, which sees CL exploring his "ladies man" persona which he first introduced on "Lots of Lovin'". It samples "Ain't Got the Love (Of One Girl on My Mind)" by The Ambassadors. The B-Side is the title track from The Main Ingredient. The single also contains a downtempo remix of "I Got A Love".

== Track listing ==
Side A

1. I Got A Love (LP Version) (4:57)
2. I Got A Love (Remix) (5:02)
3. I Got A Love (Instrumental) (4:56)

Side B

4. The Main Ingredient (LP Version) (4:46)
5. The Main Ingredient (Instrumental) (4:45)
6. I Got A Love (Remix Instrumental) (5:01)

== Chart performance ==
Chart (1994)	Peak position
Billboard Hot R&B/Hip-Hop Songs	69
Billboard Hot Rap Tracks	20
