= Soul Brother No. 1 =

Soul Brother No. 1 or Soul Brother #1 may refer to:

- "Soul Brother #1", a song from the album Mecca and the Soul Brother
- "Soul Brother #1" (Luke Cage), an episode of Luke Cage
