= Got Me Waiting =

1994 single by Heavy D & the Boyz

Single by Heavy D & the Boyz

from the album Nuttin' but Love
- Released: 1994
- Genre: Funk; hip hop
- Length: 4:31
- Label: Uptown
- Songwriters: Dwight Myers; Peter Phillips; Luther Vandross
- Producers: Heavy D; Pete Rock

Heavy D & the Boyz singles chronology
"Who's the Man" (1993)	"Got Me Waiting" (1994)	"Nuttin' but Love" (1994)

Music video
- "Got Me Waiting" on YouTube

"Got Me Waiting" is a song by American hip hop group Heavy D & the Boyz and released in 1994 by Uptown Records as the lead single from their fifth studio album, Nuttin' but Love (1994). It features vocals from singer Crystal Johnson and a sample of "Don't You Know That?" by Luther Vandross. The song was co-written and produced by Heavy D and Pete Rock, and peaked at numbers 20 and 43 on the US Billboard Hot 100 and Cash Box Top 100 charts, and number one on the Billboard Dance Singles Sales chart.

== Composition ==
The song's instrumental is built around the sample, while the lyrics find Heavy D trying to determine a woman's intentions and win her affection and attention. Crystal Johnson sings the hook.

== Critical reception ==
Larry Flick from Billboard magazine gave a positive review of the song, noting that it "shows Mr. D. in super-fine lyrical form. Atop a head-bobbin' funk/hip-hop groove, he gets all hot'n'sweaty about the girlie of his dreams. Track gains added muscle from an oh-so-soulful chorus that contrasts the rapped verses with smooth singing." Paul Barnes of HotNewHipHop wrote, "For many listeners, this song is an excellent example of how sampling can blend well without it being the selling point. While not necessarily 'jazz rap,' it's definitely not an aggressive or emotional song, either. Heavy D drops three smooth and easygoing verses that lock in on the atmosphere of the production around him."

Ralph Tee from Music Week's Record Mirror Dance Update commented, "Heavy and his Boyz return with a breezy hip hop mid-pacer that was written by Pete Rock and Heavy D, while the loop is actually a re-creation of the intro to Luther Vandross's 'Don't You Know That?'. The album Nuttin' but Love is firing, from all reports and while this little ditty is unlikely to give him a chart smash like 'Now That We Found Love', it's the sort of tune that will please his hard core of fans today and be a sought-after collectors' item in the future."

== Charts ==
Chart (1994)	Peak position
US Billboard Hot 100	20
US Dance Singles Sales (Billboard)	1
US Hot R&B/Hip-Hop Songs (Billboard)	3
US Cash Box Top 100	43
