= Get on the Mic =

Get on the Mic may refer to:

- "Get on the Mic", a song by Pete Rock & C.L. Smooth on The Main Ingredient
- "Get on the Mic", a passage of the song "B-Boy Bouillabaisse" on Paul's Boutique
- "Just Rhymin' with Biz", a song by Big Daddy Kane that features this phrase, sampled by Pete Rock & C.L. Smooth for "Get on the Mic"
