= This Is Your Night (Heavy D & the Boyz song) =

Single by Heavy D & the Boyz featuring Blackstreet

from the album Nuttin' But Love
- Released: 1994
- Length: 3:33
- Label: MCA; Uptown
- Songwriters: Teddy Riley; Heavy D
- Producer: Teddy Riley

Heavy D & the Boyz featuring Blackstreet singles chronology
"Black Coffee" (1994)	"This Is Your Night" (1994)	"Big Daddy" (1997)

"This Is Your Night" is a song by American rap group Heavy D & the Boyz. It was written by Heavy D and Teddy Riley for their fifth and final studio album, Nuttin' But Love (1994), with production helmed by the latter. The song features vocals from R&B group Blackstreet and contains elements from "Ladies' Night" (1979) by American R&B band Kool & the Gang and also samples George Benson's "Give Me the Night" (1980). Released in 1994 as the album's third international single by MCA and Uptown Records, it reached the top 20 in France and the Netherlands, and was a top-30 hit in Iceland and the UK. "This Is Your Night" was nominated in the category for Tune of the Year at the International Dance Awards 1995.

== Critical reception ==
In his weekly UK chart commentary, James Masterton described the song as "another rapped up version of a disco classic". Andy Beevers from Music Week gave it a score of four out of five, writing, "Based on the tune from George Benson's 'Give Me the Night', this radio-friendly rap track has been attracting club interest thanks to strong house mixes from BBG and Sweet Factory vs Global State." James Hamilton from the Record Mirror Dance Update described it as "infectiously rolling" in his weekly dance column.

== Charts ==
Chart (1994)	Peak position
Belgium (Ultratop 50 Flanders)	24
Europe (European Dance Radio)	2
Europe (European Hit Radio)	32
France (SNEP)	14
Iceland (Íslenski Listinn Topp 40)	26
Netherlands (Dutch Top 40)	19
Netherlands (Single Top 100)	17
Scotland (OCC)	43
UK Singles (OCC)	30
UK Airplay (Music Week)	22
UK Dance (Music Week)	3
UK Club Chart (Music Week)	7

== Release history ==
Region	Date	Format(s)	Label(s)	Ref.
France	1994	12-inch vinyl; CD	MCA; Streetbeat	
United Kingdom	September 26, 1994	12-inch vinyl; CD; cassette	MCA; Uptown	
