= All Souled Out (disambiguation) =

All Souled Out may refer to:

- All Souled Out, an EP by Pete Rock & CL Smooth
- All Souled Out (Jaya Ramsey album), an album by Jaya
- "All Souled Out" (Luke Cage), an episode of Luke Cage
