= Ernie Hines =

American soul musician

- Born: Earnest Lee-Pickford Hines; 1938 (age 87–88); Jackson, Mississippi, U.S.
- Genres: Soul, gospel
- Occupations: Singer; songwriter
- Instruments: Vocals
- Years active: 1967–present
- Labels: USA; Stax; We Produce; Baby Blue

Earnest Lee-Pickford Hines (born 1938) is an American soul musician. He was born in Jackson, Mississippi.

== Career ==
Hines moved to Baton Rouge, Louisiana, in 1958, after leaving college to play for a gospel group and later forming his own singing group. Then as a guitar player, Hines played behind L. C. Cooke, Johnnie Taylor, Joe Valentine, Clyde McPhatter, Lowell Fulson and Margie Hendrix, and played bass in Slim Harpo's band.

While living in Baton Rouge, Hines was invited by Roscoe Robinson to travel to Chicago, where Hines cut four tracks, intended for New York City based Scepter/Wand Records, the label with which Roscoe Robinson had recently had a national hit with "That's Enough". However, the deal with Scepter/Wand did not come through, and consequently Hines bought the masters back and leased them to the Chicago-based record label USA Records, which released two singles by Hines in 1967 and 1968.

In 1970, he was signed to Stax Records by Al Bell. His first single on the Stax label was his own composition "Help Me Put out the Flame", featuring Hines on guitar as well as lead vocals. Subsequent records were released on the Stax subsidiary We Produce: two singles, "Electrified Love" and "Our Generation", in 1971, and in 1972, the album Electrified. The Electrified album has received cult following since the 1990s, and in 2010, it was made available again in CD format by the UK re-release company, Ace Records, on its BGP (Beat Goes Public) label. The AllMusic review of Electrified stated:

...by the mid-'90s collectors were abuzz looking for this lost LP. With back-catalog reissues still reaping beaucoup dollars for the music industry and with the help of further promotion from John Legend and the Roots covering "Our Generation" in 2010, the perfect storm was created to take another look.

The song "Our Generation" has been covered by John Legend and the Roots in 2010, and has been remixed by DJ Nu-Mark and released in 2013 as by DJ Nu-Mark featuring Ernie Hines. Most notably, the chorus in "Our Generation" was sampled by hip-hop duo Pete Rock & CL Smooth on their top-charting single "Straighten It Out," from their 1992 album, Mecca and the Soul Brother.

In the 2000s, Hines continued his recording career, releasing a gospel album, an EP and two singles on his own Baby Blue Records label, as well as a re-release of the early USA Records sides.

== Discography ==
Albums

- Electrified (We Produce, 1972)
- There Is A Way - Inspirational Songs of Faith Hope and Love (Baby Blue, 2004)

Singles

- "Thank You Baby (For A Love Beyond Compare)" / "We're Gonna Party" (USA, 1967)
- "Sincerely Mine" / "Rain Rain Rain" (USA, 1968)
- "Help Me Put Out The Flame (In My Heart)" / "A Better World (For Everyone)" (Stax, 1970)
- "Electrified Love" / "Come On Y'all" (We Produce, 1971)
- "Our Generation" / "What Would I Do" (We Produce, 1971)
- "My Baby Wears the Lovin' Crown / Can You Put It to Music?" (Baby Blue, 2002)
- "Everlasting Love (The Wedding Song)" (Baby Blue, 2011)
- "Our Generation" (re-edit) / "Our Generation" (Cali mix) (credited to: DJ Nu-Mark Featuring Ernie Hines, Hot Plate, 2013)

EPs

- Kunta Kinte - Remembering Roots (2009) ("Not As Beautiful As You" / "Kunta Kinte (the Man)" / "Ain't It Beautiful" / "All That Glitters Is Not Gold" / "Let Your Love Flow")

EP compilation

- The Singles (The Early Years) (2009) (Baby Blue) (A re-release of the four tracks released on USA in the 1960s)
