= CL Smooth =

American rapper (born 1968)

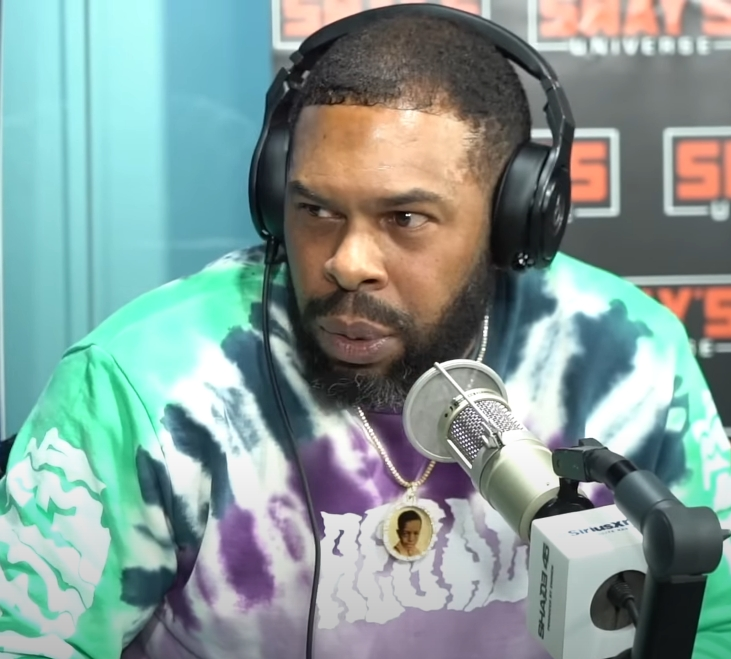
- CL Smooth in 2019.

Background information
- Also known as: Caramel King; The Mecca Don; C.L.; El Presidente; Corey Kingpenn
- Born: Corey Brent Penn; October 8, 1968 (age 58); New Rochelle, New York, U.S.
- Genre: East Coast hip hop
- Occupations: Rapper; music producer
- Years active: 1989–present
- Labels: Elektra; Shaman Work; Koch
- Formerly of: Pete Rock & CL Smooth

Corey Brent Penn Sr. (born October 8, 1968), known by his stage name CL Smooth, is an American rapper.

== Early life ==
Corey Brent Penn Sr. was born on October 8, 1968, in New Rochelle, New York, to a mother who was still in high school and a father who was largely absent after his birth. His main caregivers were his grandmother, who worked as a pediatric nurse, and his grandfather, who worked as a dry-cleaning presser. Smooth attended Mount Vernon High School, where he met future producer/DJ/rapper Pete Rock.

== Career ==
After the duo Pete Rock & CL Smooth split in 1995, Pete Rock produced and remixed tracks for dozens of other acts and released instrumental solo albums, while CL Smooth remained musically inactive.

Since their split, the two managed to reconcile their differences only long enough to record seven tracks over the course of ten years, namely "Da Two," "Back On Da Block," "Shine On Me," "Climax," "Fly 'Til I Die," "Appreciate," and "It's A Love Thing." In 2004, there was talk of a reunion and a new album, both of which were thwarted by another fallout.

During this period, CL Smooth mostly declined to appear on other artists' albums, with the exception of "Only the Strong Survive" with DJ Krush in 1996.

Starting around the year 2004, CL Smooth began making guest appearances more frequently. Among the artists to whose songs he has contributed guest vocals are AZ ("Magic Hour"), Raekwon ("Silk", also featuring Sauce Money), Nujabes ("Sky Is Falling"), JR Writer (the remix of "Mesmerize"), and Supafuh ("Act of Faith"). As of 2022, his most recent guest appearance was on the song "The Masters" by the Canadian rapper–producer duo of Ghettosocks and DK.

CL Smooth released his debut solo album, American Me, in 2006. To promote the album, Shaman Work released a promotional mixtape compiled by DJ J Period called Man On Fire in late April 2006, featuring 36 minutes of freestyles and a remixed version of the track "Impossible". He was also featured on the DJ Jazzy Jeff album The Return of the Magnificent on the track "All I Know", which was also featured in the video game NBA Live 08. Around the same time, he released a single called "Perfect Timing", featuring Skyzoo.

In October 2010, Smooth and Pete Rock headlined the Clean Energy Tour. The tour comprised six shows across California, and focused on voter mobilization leading up to the November 2010 midterm elections. CL Smooth has developed an interest in, and become an activist in opposition to, climate change. He was a vocal opponent of Proposition 23.

In February 2019, CL Smooth released a single entitled "Just In Town", featuring and produced by Fleezy E and Wayno Da Producer for Da Watchmen.

== Discography ==
=== Solo albums ===
- American Me (2006)
- The Outsider (2007)

=== Pete Rock & CL Smooth albums ===
Album information
Mecca and the Soul Brother
- Released: June 9, 1992
- Billboard 200 chart position: #43
- R&B/Hip-Hop chart position: #7
- Singles: "They Reminisce Over You (T.R.O.Y.)", "Straighten It Out" & "Lots of Lovin'"
The Main Ingredient
- Released: November 8, 1994
- Billboard 200 chart position: #51
- R&B/Hip-Hop chart position: #9
- Singles: "I Got a Love", "Take You There", & "Searching"

=== Collaborations ===
- Johnny Gill featuring CL Smooth - "Rub You the Right Way (Extended Hype I)" (1990)
- Basic Black featuring Pete Rock & CL Smooth - "She's Mine" (1990)
- Public Enemy featuring CL Smooth - "Nighttrain (Pete Rock Mixes) (1991)
- Heavy D & The Boyz featuring Big Daddy Kane, Grand Puba, Kool G Rap, Q-Tip & Pete Rock & CL Smooth - "Don't Curse" (1991)
- Rough House Survivors featuring CL Smooth - "Can U Dig It?" (1992)
- Greg Osby featuring CL Smooth - "Raise" (1993)
- Da Youngstas featuring Pete Rock & CL Smooth -"Who's the Mic Wrecka" (1993)
- Alexander O'Neal featuring Pete Rock & CL Smooth - "In the Middle (Brown Mix)" (1993)
- Run-DMC featuring Pete Rock & CL Smooth - "Down with the King" (1993)
- DJ Krush featuring CL Smooth - "Only the Strong Survive" (1995)
- Mona Lisa featuring CL Smooth - "You Said (Remix)" (1996)
- Martine Girault featuring CL Smooth - "Revival (Bad Boy Remix)" {1996)
- Tara Thomas featuring CL Sooth - "When You're in Love" (1997)
- Angel Grant featuring CL Smooth - "Knockin' (Hip Hop Remix)" (1998)
- Pete Rock featuring CL Smooth - "Da Two" (1998)
- Cobra featuring CL Smooth - "Gunslingers" (2000)
- Pete Rock featuring CL Smooth - "Back on the Block" (2001)
- Mr. Cheeks featuring Pete Rock, Journalist & CL Smooth - "Reminisce '03"
- Pete Rock featuring CL Smooth - "Appreciate" (2004)
- AZ featuring CL Smooth - "Magic Hour" (2006)
- Nujabes featuring CL Smooth - "Sky Is Falling" (2007)
- DJ Jazzy Jeff featuring CL Smooth - "All I Know" (2007)
- STatik Selektah featuring CL Smooth - "So Good (Live from the Bar)" (2008)
- Vee featuring CL Smooth - "Da Piano" (2009)
- JR Writer featuring CL Smooth - "Mesmerized" [Remix] (2009) (alternate version also features Fishscales of Nappy Roots)
- Cradle Orchestra featuring CL Smooth - "All I Want" (2009)
- Cradle Orchestra featuring CL Smooth & Jean Curley - "Married to the Game" (2010)
- John Legend & The Roots featuring CL Smooth - "Our Generation (The Hope of the World)" (2010)
- Supafuh featuring CL Smooth - "Act Of Faith" (2011)
- Raekwon featuring CL Smooth & Sauce Money - "Silk" (2013)
- Ghettosocks & DK featuring CL Smooth & El Da Sensei - "The Masters" (2022)
- Real Bad Man & Blu - "The Golden Rule" (2023)
- Paul Wall & Terminology - "It's Magic" (2023)
- SPice 1 featuring DJ Premier & CL Smooth - "Since the Day" (2024)
