= Big Tyme =

Studio album by Heavy D & the Boyz
- Released: June 12, 1989
- Studio: Unique, New York City
- Genre: New jack swing; hip hop
- Length: 53:53
- Label: Uptown; MCA
- Producer: Heavy D; DJ Eddie F; Marley Marl; Pete Rock; Teddy Riley; Al B. Sure!; Nevelle

Heavy D & the Boyz chronology
Living Large (1987)	Big Tyme (1989)	Peaceful Journey (1991)

Singles from Big Tyme
- 1. "We Got Our Own Thang" Released: May 9, 1989; 2. "Somebody for Me" Released: 1989; 3. "Gyrlz, They Love Me" Released: 1990; 4. "Big Tyme" Released: 1990

Big Tyme is the second album by American hip hop group Heavy D & the Boyz and their last album before Trouble T. Roy's death in 1990. It was released on June 12, 1989, through Uptown Records. The album was produced by DJ Eddie F, Teddy Riley, Al B. Sure!, Marley Marl, Pete Rock, and Heavy D.

Big Tyme was supported by four singles: "We Got Our Own Thang", "Somebody for Me", "Gyrlz, They Love Me" and "Big Tyme". The album received generally positive reviews from music critics and was a commercial success.

The album is also notable for containing the first productions made by legendary producer Pete Rock.

== Reception ==
Professional ratings
Review scores
Source	Rating
AllMusic	4.5/5 stars
Robert Christgau	B−

The album was considerably more successful than the group's last album, making it to number 19 on the Billboard 200 and number 1 on the Top R&B/Hip-Hop Albums chart.

== Track listing ==
1. "We Got Our Own Thang" (prod. by Teddy Riley) - 3:50
2. "You Ain't Heard Nuttin Yet" (prod. by DJ Eddie F) - 4:28
3. "Somebody for Me" (prod. by DJ Eddie F, Nevelle, Heavy D & Al B. Sure!) - 5:03
4. "Mood for Love" (prod. by DJ Eddie F, Heavy D & Pete Rock) - 5:27
5. "Ez Duz It, Do It Ez" (prod. by Marley Marl) - 3:59
6. "A Better Land" (prod. by Heavy D & Pete Rock) - 4:55
7. "Gyrlz, They Love Me" (prod. by Marley Marl and Heavy D) - 4:52
8. "More Bounce" (prod. by DJ Eddie F & Heavy D) - 4:53
9. "Big Tyme" (prod. by DJ Eddie F & Pete Rock) - 4:56
10. "Flexin" (prod. by DJ Eddie F) - 3:51
11. "Here We Go Again, Y'all" (prod. by Marley Marl) - 4:05
12. "Let It Flow" (prod. by DJ Eddie F, Heavy D & Pete Rock) - 3:45

== Charts ==
=== Weekly charts ===
Chart (1989)	Peak position
US Billboard 200	19
US Top R&B/Hip-Hop Albums (Billboard)	1

=== Year-end charts ===
Chart (1989)	Position
US Billboard 200	77
US Top R&B/Hip-Hop Albums (Billboard)	25

Chart (1990)	Position
US Billboard 200	92
US Top R&B/Hip-Hop Albums (Billboard)	17

== Certifications ==
Region	Certification	Certified units/sales
United States (RIAA)	Platinum	1,000,000^{^}
^{^} Shipments figures based on certification alone.

== See also ==
- List of number-one R&B albums of 1989 (U.S.)
