= Black Coffee (Heavy D & the Boyz song) =

1994 single by Heavy D & the Boyz

Single by Heavy D & the Boyz

from the album Nuttin' but Love
- Released: 1994
- Length: 4:27
- Label: Uptown
- Songwriters: Dwight Myers; Peter Phillips; Osten Harvey Jr.; James Brown; Fred Wesley; John Starks
- Producers: Heavy D; Pete Rock; Easy Mo Bee

Heavy D & the Boyz singles chronology
| "Nuttin' but Love" (1994) | "Black Coffee" (1994) | "This Is Your Night" (1994) |

Music video
- "Black Coffee" on YouTube

"Black Coffee" is a song by American hip hop group Heavy D & the Boyz and was released in 1994 by Uptown Records as the third single from their fifth studio album, Nuttin' but Love (1994). Produced by Heavy D, Pete Rock and Easy Mo Bee, it contains a sample of "The Payback" by James Brown. The song peaked at numbers 57 and 71 on the US Billboard Hot 100 and Cash Box Top 100 charts, and number 15 on the Billboard Hot R&B/Hip-Hop Songs chart. It is considered an ode to black women, whom Heavy D describes as his ideal lover and compares to coffee with no sugar or cream.

== Critical reception ==
Larry Flick from Billboard magazine wrote, "This cut from Nuttin' But Love delivers the goods. With a heavy dose of hip-hop, Heavy D. and his Boyz brew a busy backbeat, dripping with a potent blend of playful lyrics and stimulating samples. A soulful backing vocal adds an R&B flavor. Good to the last bass drop."

== Charts ==
| Chart (1994) | Peak position |
|---|---|
| US Billboard Hot 100 | 57 |
| US Hot R&B/Hip-Hop Songs (Billboard) | 15 |
| US Maxi-Singles Sales (Billboard) | 6 |
| US Cash Box Top 100 | 71 |
