= Nuttin' but Love (song) =

1994 single by Heavy D & the Boyz

Single by Heavy D & the Boyz

from the album Nuttin' but Love
- Released: 1994
- Genre: Hip hop
- Length: 3:33
- Label: Uptown
- Songwriters: Dwight Myers; David Love Jr.; Jean-Claude Olivier
- Producers: Heavy D; Kid Capri

Heavy D & the Boyz singles chronology
"Got Me Waiting" (1994)	"Nuttin' but Love" (1994)	"Black Coffee" (1994)

Music video
- "Nuttin' but Love" on YouTube

"Nuttin' but Love" is a song by American hip hop group Heavy D & the Boyz and the second single from their fifth studio album of the same name (1994). It was released by Uptown Records in 1994 and features vocals from American singer Vinia Mojica. Produced by Heavy D and Kid Capri, the song samples Bob James' cover of "Take Me to the Mardi Gras", "Ecstasy" by Endgames, "My Love" by Mary J. Blige featuring Heavy D, and "Talk is Cheap" by Heavy D & the Boyz. "Nuttin' but Love'" peaked at numbers 40 and 52 on the US Billboard Hot 100 and Cash Box Top 100 charts. Brett Ratner directed the music video.

== Critical reception ==
Upon the release, pan-European magazine Music & Media wrote, "A teasing and stomping hip hop number, built upon a nagging chorus. The repeated vocal interplay between the man (pleading endless love) and the woman (who's not really interested) works wonders. Deserves to be an EHR hit."

== Music video ==
The accompanying music video for "Nuttin' but Love" was directed by American director and producer Brett Ratner and filmed in New York City. Mark Reshovsky directed photography and Jason Taragan produced the video. It was featured on music television channels as MTV and BET. The video has guest appearances from comedians Chris Tucker and Talent as well as many models including Cynthia Bailey, Beverly Peele and Rebecca Gayheart.

== Charts ==
Chart (1994)	Peak position
US Billboard Hot 100	40
US Hot R&B/Hip-Hop Songs (Billboard)	18
US Maxi-Singles Sales (Billboard)	6
US Cash Box Top 100	52
