= Big Daddy (Heavy D song) =

Single by Heavy D

from the album Waterbed Hev
- Released: February 18, 1997
- Recorded: 1996–1997
- Genre: Hip hop; R&B
- Length: 4:09
- Label: Uptown / Universal
- Songwriter: Dwight Myers
- Producers: Heavy D, Tony Dofat

Heavy D singles chronology
"This Is Your Night" (1994)	"Big Daddy" (1997)	"I'll Do Anything" (1997)

"Big Daddy" is the lead single from Heavy D's sixth album, Waterbed Hev. Produced by Heavy D and Tony Dofat and featuring vocals from Keanna Henson, "Big Daddy" was a success, peaking at 18 on the Billboard Hot 100. It became Heavy D's second biggest hit after 1991's "Now That We Found Love", which reached No. 11 on the Hot 100. The single also earned a gold certification on May 6, 1997 for sales of 500,000 copies and reached 73 on Billboard's Year-End Hot 100 singles of 1997. The official remix sampled Soul II Soul's 1989 hit "Back to Life (However Do You Want Me)" and featured a guest verse from McGruff.

== Single track listing ==
1. "Big Daddy" (LP Version)- 3:55
2. "Big Daddy" (Radio Version)- 3:47
3. "Big Daddy" (Acappella)- 3:53

== Charts and certifications ==
=== Weekly charts ===
Chart (1997)	Peak position
Billboard Hot 100	18
Billboard Hot R&B/Hip-Hop Singles & Tracks	5
Billboard Hot Rap Singles	2
Billboard Hot Dance Music/Maxi-Singles Sales	4

=== Year-end charts ===
Chart (1997)	Position
US Billboard Hot 100	73
US Hot R&B/Hip-Hop Songs (Billboard)	16

=== Certifications ===
Region	Certification	Certified units/sales
United States (RIAA)	Gold	500,000
