= Is It Good to You =

1991 single by Heavy D & the Boyz

Single by Heavy D & the Boyz

from the album Peaceful Journey
- Released: July 2, 1991
- Length: 4:52
- Label: Uptown
- Songwriters: Dwight Myers; Teddy Riley; Norman Giscombe; Bob Carter
- Producer: Teddy Riley

Heavy D & the Boyz singles chronology
"Big Tyme" (1990)	"Is It Good to You" (1991)	"Now That We Found Love" (1991)

Music video
- "Is It Good to You" on YouTube

"Is It Good to You" is a song by American hip hop group Heavy D & the Boyz, released in July 2, 1991 by Uptown Records as the lead single from their third studio album, Peaceful Journey (1991). Is It Good to You climbed into the Top 40 of the US Hot 100. Produced by Teddy Riley, the song contains a sample from the beginning of "Mama Used to Say" by Junior Giscombe.

The song features vocals from singer Tammy Lucas on the chorus. Riley also produced a remixed version of the song for the soundtrack to the motion picture Juice.

== Charts ==
Chart (1991)	Peak position
Australia (ARIA)	76
Belgium (Ultratop 50 Flanders)	26
Netherlands (Single Top 100)	32
New Zealand (Recorded Music NZ)	23
UK Singles (Official Charts)	46
UK Airplay (Music Week)	49
UK Dance (Music Week)	13
UK Club Chart (Record Mirror)	100
US Billboard Hot 100	32
US Hot R&B/Hip-Hop Songs (Billboard)	13
