= Peaceful Journey =

Studio album by Heavy D & the Boyz
- Released: July 2, 1991
- Studios: Unique, New York City
- Genres: Hip hop; R&B; new jack swing
- Length: 66:41
- Labels: Uptown; MCA
- Producers: DJ Eddie F; Teddy Riley; Pete Rock; Marley Marl; Howie Tee; Dave Hall & Nevelle Hodge

Heavy D & the Boyz chronology
| Big Tyme (1989) | Peaceful Journey (1991) | Blue Funk (1992) |

Singles from Peaceful Journey
- 1. "Is It Good to You" Released: 1991; 2. "Now That We Found Love" Released: June 11, 1991; 3. "Don't Curse" Released: 1991; 4. "The Lover's Got What U Need" Released: 1991

Peaceful Journey is the third album by American rap group Heavy D & the Boyz. It was released on July 2, 1991, for Uptown Records and was produced by Pete Rock, DJ Eddie F, Teddy Riley, Marley Marl and Howie Tee. This marked the group's first album since the death of member Trouble T Roy, who died almost a year before the album's release, and several songs on the album pay tribute to him. Though not as successful as the group's previous album, Big Tyme, the album was able to reach Platinum status and made it to number 21 on the Billboard 200 and number 5 on the Top R&B/Hip-Hop Albums chart.

The following singles also charted: "Now That We Found Love" (UK No. 2, US No. 11), "Is It Good to You", "Don't Curse" and "Peaceful Journey", which sampled the bass line from "This Place Hotel" by the Jacksons. Guests on the album include Aaron Hall, Big Daddy Kane, Grand Puba, Kool G. Rap, Q-Tip, Pete Rock & CL Smooth, Daddy Freddy and K-Ci & JoJo.

== Critical reception ==
Professional ratings
Review scores
| Source | Rating |
|---|---|
| AllMusic | 4.5/5 stars |
| The Baltimore Sun | (favorable) |
| Calgary Herald | B |
| Robert Christgau | (1-star Honorable Mention) |
| Encyclopedia of Popular Music | 3/5 stars |
| Entertainment Weekly | B |
| Melody Maker | (favorable) |
| NME | (favorable) |

James Muretich from the Calgary Herald wrote, "Heavy D. lays down uplifting messages without getting wimpy, is sexual without becoming moronically macho. Combine that with hook-laden songs sampling from the likes of Booker T. & the M.G.'s and The Persuaders, as well as some riffs by The Boyz, and you`ve got rap with soul - in every sense of the word." James Bernard from Entertainment Weekly commented, "His music in Peaceful Journey, softened by hummable bass lines, swings rather than stomps, and the ”Hevster” has nimble lyrics to match — a combination that should earn songs like ”Now That We Found Love”, a fast-paced hip-house jam, loads of club and airplay. There are too few surprises here, however, in part because Heavy D. sometimes leans too much on sampled tracks, as on the title cut, an ode to friendship that is far too friendly with the Jacksons’ ”This Place Hotel”."

== Track listing ==
1. "Now That We Found Love" (vocals by Aaron Hall) (Kenneth Gamble, Leon Huff) - 4:18
2. "Let It Rain" (Dwight Meyers, Corey Penn, Peter Phillips) - 4:15
3. "I Can Make You Go Oooh" (Dwight Meyers, Howard Thompson) - 3:51
4. "Sister Sister" (Dwight Meyers, Marlon Williams) - 4:39
5. "Don't Curse" with Big Daddy Kane, Grand Puba, Kool G. Rap, Q-Tip & Pete Rock & CL Smooth (Dwight Meyers, Antonio Hardy, Maxwell Dixon, Nathaniel Wilson, Jonathan Davis, Peter Phillips, Corey Penn) - 5:53
6. "Peaceful Journey" (Dwight Meyers, Edward Ferrell) - 6:05
7. "The Lover's Got What U Need" (Dwight Meyers, Marlon Williams) - 4:02
8. "Cuz He'z Alwayz Around" (Dwight Meyers, Peter Phillips) - 4:40
9. "Is It Good to You" (Dwight Meyers, Teddy Riley) - 4:52
10. "Letter to the Future" (Dwight Meyers, Peter Phillips) - 4:49
11. "Swinging with da Hevster" (Dwight Meyers, Marlon Williams) - 4:20
12. "Body and Mind" feat. Daddy Freddy (Bunny Sigler, James Sigler, Cary Gilbert) - 4:20
13. "Do Me, Do Me" (Dwight Meyers, Peter Phillips) - 4:11

== Personnel ==
- Teddy Riley, Pete Rock, Marley Marl, Howie Tee, Dave Hall, Nevelle Hodge, Darren Lighty: Keyboards and Drum Programming
- Aaron Hall: Background vocals on "Now That We've Found Love"
- The Flex (Darren Lighty, Cliff Lighty, Eric Williams): Background vocals on "Sister, Sister" and "The Lover's Got What U Need"
- K-Ci & JoJo: Background vocals on "Peaceful Journey"
- Perfection: Background vocals on "The Lover's Got What U Need"
- Johnny Gill: Background vocals on "Letter to the Future"
- Lady Levi: Background vocals on "Body and Mind"
- Dave Way, Chris "Champ" Champion, Booker T. Jones, Angela Piva, Marley Marl, David Kennedy: Recording engineer
- Chris "Champ" Champion, Mark Partis, Angela Piva, Roey Shamir, David Kennedy: Mixing
- Nick Baratta: Photography
- Reiner Design Consultants, Inc.: Art Direction

== Samples ==
- "Do Me, Do Me"
  - "Funky President" by James Brown
- "Don't Curse"
  - "Hip Hug-Her" by Booker T. & the M.G.'s
- "Is It Good to You"
  - Interpolation of the bass line of "Mama Used to Say" by Junior Giscombe and Bob Carter
- "Peaceful Journey"
  - "This Place Hotel (Heartbreak Hotel)" by the Jackson 5
- "Swinging with da Hevster"
  - "Rock Creek Park" by the Blackbyrds
- "The Lover's Got What You Need"
  - "Love Hangover" by Diana Ross

== Charts ==
=== Weekly charts ===
| Chart (1991) | Peak position |
|---|---|
| Australian Albums (ARIA) | 70 |
| US Billboard 200 | 21 |
| US Top R&B/Hip-Hop Albums (Billboard) | 5 |

=== Year-end charts ===
| Chart (1991) | Position |
|---|---|
| US Billboard 200 | 88 |
| US Top R&B/Hip-Hop Albums (Billboard) | 36 |

== Certifications ==
| Region | Certification | Certified units/sales |
|---|---|---|
| United States (RIAA) | Platinum | 1,000,000^{^} |
^{^} Shipments figures based on certification alone.
