= The Outsider (CL Smooth album) =

Studio album by CL Smooth
- Released: August 21, 2007
- Genre: Hip hop
- Label: Blackheart Entertainment
- Producer: J Period; Terence "Tramp-Baby" Abney; KayGee; Drawzilla; B Rock; John Legend

CL Smooth chronology
American Me (2006)	The Outsider (2007)

The Outsider is the second album by East Coast rapper CL Smooth. The album is considered a companion to his previous album American Me. In addition to exclusive remixes, The Outsider also features new songs, as well as audio versions of live performances.

== Track listing ==
#	Title	Composer(s)	Performer	Producer(s)	Length
1	"Intro... All We Ever Know"	C. Penn	CL Smooth		
2	"I Need A Boss [Remix]"	C. Penn	CL Smooth		
3	"No Justice"	C. Penn	CL Smooth		
4	"Impossible [J Period Remix]"	C. Penn	CL Smooth	Just Blaze	
5	"I Gotta Love [Live in Holland]"	C. Penn	CL Smooth		
6	"Down With The Kings [Live in Holland]"	C. Penn	CL Smooth		
7	"Warm Outside [Drawzilla Remix]"	C. Penn	CL Smooth	Drawzilla	
8	"Gorilla Pimpin"	C. Penn; T. Abney	CL Smooth	Tramp-baby & Kaygee	
9	"Is It Really You?"	C. Penn	CL Smooth	Soul Supreme	
10	"The Outsider"	C. Penn	CL Smooth		
11	"Get Back"	C. Penn	CL Smooth		
12	"Straighten It Out [Live in Holland]"	C. Penn	CL Smooth		
13	"Love Is A Battlefield"	C. Penn	CL Smooth	Pete Rock	
14	"War Of The Roses"	C. Penn	CL Smooth; Butta Verses		
15	"Smoke In The Air [Live in Holland]"	C. Penn	CL Smooth		
16	"Who You Gonna Trust?"	C. Penn	CL Smooth	Don Joe	
17	"Mesmorized [B Rock Remix]"	C. Penn; J. Brito	CL Smooth; J. R. Writer; Fishscales of Nappy Roots		
18	"Heaven Only Knows [John Legend Remix]"	C. Penn	CL Smooth	John Legend	
19	"American Gangster"	C. Penn	CL Smooth; SJ; Young Breed		
20	"American Me [Live in Holland]"	C. Penn	CL Smooth	Heatmakerz	
21	"T.R.O.Y. [Live in Holland]"	C. Penn; P. Phillips	CL Smooth	Pete Rock	
22	"DJ Shakim Outro"	C. Penn	DJ Shakim		
