= Nuttin' but Love =

Studio album by Heavy D & the Boyz
- Released: May 24, 1994
- Recorded: 1993–94
- Studios: Soundtrack Studios; Greene St. Recording; House of Hits (New York City); Future Recording Studios (Virginia Beach, VA)
- Genre: Hip hop
- Length: 51:50
- Labels: Uptown; MCA
- Producers: DJ Eddie F; Teddy Riley; Marley Marl; Erick Sermon; Pete Rock; Easy Mo Bee; Poke

Heavy D & the Boyz chronology
Blue Funk (1993)	Nuttin' but Love (1994)	Waterbed Hev (1997)

Singles from Nuttin' but Love
- 1. "Got Me Waiting" Released: 1994; 2. "Nuttin' but Love" Released: 1994; 3. "Black Coffee" Released: 1994; 4. "This Is Your Night" Released: 1994

Professional ratings
Review scores
Source	Rating
AllMusic	4/5 stars
Knoxville News Sentinel	2.5/5 stars
NME	6/10
The Source	4/5

Nuttin' but Love is the fifth and final studio album by American rap group Heavy D & the Boyz. It was released on May 24, 1994 via Uptown Records. Recording sessions took place at Soundtrack Studios, Greene St. Recording and House of Hits in New York City and at Future Recording Studios in Virginia. Production was handled by DJ Eddie F, Teddy Riley, Marley Marl, Erick Sermon, Kid Capri, Easy Mo Bee, Poke of The Trackmasters, and Pete Rock. The first track on the album, "Friends & Respect", featured spoken intros by the likes of LL Cool J, Buju Banton, KRS-One, Kool G Rap, Little Shawn, MC Lyte, Martin Lawrence, Pete Rock, Positive K, Q-Tip, Queen Latifah, Spike Lee and Treach.

== Charts and singles ==
Nuttin' but Love proved to be the group's most successful release, reaching No. 11 on the Billboard 200, No. 1 on Billboard's Top R&B/Hip-Hop Albums chart (for one week), and was certified 2× Platinum. Four singles from the album made it on at least one Billboard singles chart: "Got Me Waiting" (the highest-charting single from the album, peaking at No. 20 on the Billboard Hot 100), "Nuttin' but Love", "Black Coffee" and "Sex wit You".

== Critical reception ==
Ian McCann from NME wrote, "Nuttin' but Love, wrapped in a truly crummy sleeve, is more of what the D' does best, ie getting serious on the sofa while keeping one foot firmly on the shag pile. While it's hardly more than solid, standard, night-on mainstream rap, with a couple of cuts overseen by Pete Rock, you know that at least it's gonna be booming in parts."

== Track listing ==
1. "Friends & Respect" (Dwight Meyers, Jean-Claude Olivier) - 5:12
2. "Sex wit You" (Dwight Meyers, Peter Phillips) - 4:04
3. "Got Me Waiting" (Dwight Meyers, Peter Phillips) - 4:31
4. "Nuttin' but Love" (Dwight Meyers, David Love) - 3:34
5. "Something Goin' On" (Dwight Meyers, Marlon Williams) - 3:28
6. "This Is Your Night" (Dwight Meyers, Teddy Riley) - 3:31
7. "Got Me Waiting (Remix)" (featuring Silk) (Dwight Meyers, Peter Phillips) - 6:11
8. "Take Your Time" (Dwight Meyers, Erick Sermon) - 4:07
9. "Spend a Little Time on Top" (Dwight Meyers, Marlon Williams) - 3:23
10. "Keep It Goin'" (Dwight Meyers, Troy Williams) - 3:59
11. "Black Coffee" (Dwight Meyers, Osten Harvey, Peter Phillips) - 4:28
12. "Move On" (Dwight Meyers, Jean-Claude Olivier) - 4:28
13. "The Lord's Prayer" (Dwight Meyers) - 0:54

== Charts ==
Chart (1994)	Peak position
Billboard 200	11
Billboard Top R&B Albums	1

== Certifications ==
Region	Certification	Certified units/sales
United States (RIAA)	Platinum	1,000,000^{^}
^{^} Shipments figures based on certification alone.

== See also ==
- List of number-one R&B albums of 1994 (U.S.)
