= Vibes (Heavy D album) =

Studio album by Heavy D
- Released: December 16, 2008
- Recorded: 2008
- Genre: Reggae fusion
- Length: 36:16
- Label: Federal Distribution; Malaco Records (re-issue)
- Producer: Heavy D., Tony Dofat, Mike City, Warryn Campbell, Jimi Kendrix, Charlie Bereal, Justin Sampson

Heavy D chronology
Heavy (1999)	Vibes (2008)	Love Opus (2011)

Singles from Vibes
- 1. "Long Distance Girlfriend" Released: 2008; 2. "No Matter What" Released: 2009

Professional ratings
Review scores
Source	Rating
Allmusic	4/5 stars

Vibes is the third studio album and overall eighth studio album by Heavy D. It is a reggae album, and does not contain any rapping.

== Track listing ==
1. "Long Distance Girlfriend" - Dofat, Longe, Myers 4:18
2. "No Matter What" - Brown, Myers, Winans 4:12
3. "Queen Majesty" - Mayfield, Myers 3:51
4. "Love Me Like This" (ft. Barrington Levy) - Myers 3:43
5. "My Love Is All I Have" - Myers 3:44
6. "Hugs and Kisses" - Flowers 3:33
7. "Private Dancer" (ft. Sizzla) - Myers 3:32
8. "Delilah" - Campbell, Myers 3:33
9. "Chasing Windmills" - Dofat, Myers, Omley, Smith, Smith 3:27
10. "Sincere" - Bereal, Bereal, Brown, Myers 4:23

== Album chart positions ==
Chart	Peak positions
Reggae Albums	#2
