= Living Large =

Living Large...

Studio album by Heavy D & the Boyz
- Released: October 27, 1987
- Recorded: 1986–1987
- Genre: Hip hop; new jack swing
- Length: 44:18
- Label: Uptown; MCA
- Producer: Andre Harrell (also exec.); DJ Eddie F; Heavy D; Marley Marl; Teddy Riley

Heavy D & the Boyz chronology
Living Large... (1987)	Big Tyme (1989)

Singles from Living Large...
- 1. "Mr. Big Stuff" Released: 1986; 2. "Chunky But Funky" Released: 1987; 3. "Don't You Know" Released: 1988

Professional ratings
Review scores
Source	Rating
AllMusic	3.5/5 stars
New Musical Express	6/10
RapReviews	7.5/10
The Rolling Stone Album Guide	3.5/5 stars

Living Large... is the debut studio album by American hip hop group Heavy D & the Boyz. It was released on October 27, 1987, through Uptown Records. The album was produced by Andre Harrell, DJ Eddie F, Teddy Riley, Marley Marl, and Heavy D. The album was a success for the group, reaching number 92 on the Billboard 200 and number 10 on the Top R&B/Hip-Hop Albums chart. It sold over 300,000 copies. Living Large... is today considered to be a classic. Three singles were released: "Mr. Big Stuff", "Chunky But Funky" and "Don't You Know".

In 1998, the album was selected as one of The Source's 100 Best Rap Albums Ever.

== Track listing ==
All lyrics are written by Dwight Myers.

No.	Title	Producer(s)	Length
1.	"The Overweight Lovers in the House"	Marley Marl; Heavy D (co.)	3:34
2.	"Nike"	DJ Eddie F; Heavy D	2:00
3.	"Chunky But Funky" (Remix)	Andre Harrell; Teddy Riley	3:57
4.	"Dedicated"	Teddy Riley; DJ Eddie F (co.)	4:10
5.	"Here We Go"	Teddy Riley; Heavy D (co.)	3:43
6.	"On the Dance Floor"	Andre Harrell; Teddy Riley	2:59
7.	"Moneyearnin' Mount Vernon"	DJ Eddie F; Teddy Riley	3:32
8.	"I'm Gonna Make You Love Me"	DJ Eddie F; Teddy Riley	2:12
9.	"Overweighter"	DJ Eddie F	3:15
10.	"I'm Getting Paid"	Teddy Riley; Heavy D (co.)	3:29
11.	"Rock the Bass"	Heavy D; Teddy Riley; DJ Eddie F (co.)	3:44
12.	"Mr. Big Stuff" (Remix)	Andre Harrell; DJ Eddie F (co.)	3:23
13.	"Don't You Know"	Heavy D; Teddy Riley	4:20
Total length:			44:18

== Charts ==
=== Weekly charts ===
Chart (1987)	Peak position
US Billboard 200	92
US Top R&B/Hip-Hop Albums (Billboard)	10

=== Year-end charts ===
Chart (1988)	Position
US Top R&B/Hip-Hop Albums (Billboard)	15
