= Love Opus =

Studio album by Heavy D
- Released: September 27, 2011
- Genre: Hip hop
- Length: 27:59
- Label: Stride Entertainment
- Producer: Grinehouse (David "Davix" Foreman and Dashawn "Happie" White)

Heavy D chronology
Vibes (2008)	Love Opus (2011)

Love Opus is the fourth and final studio album and overall ninth studio album by Heavy D. It was released on September 27, 2011 on Stride Entertainment, almost two months before Heavy D's death.

== Track listing ==
No.	Title	Length
1.	"Love In a Bottle"	3:23
2.	"Valentine 2/14"	4:12
3.	"Still Missing You" (featuring Carl Thomas)	3:35
4.	"I Can't" (featuring Anthony Hamilton)	4:00
5.	"Put It All on Me"	3:11
6.	"Love Your Soul"	2:52
7.	"Dance for You"	3:30
8.	"Hello"	3:13
