= Blue Funk =

Studio album by Heavy D & The Boyz
- Released: December 22, 1992
- Recorded: 1992
- Studio: The Hit Factory (New York, NY); Soundtrack Studios (New York, NY); Axis Studios (New York, NY); Greene St. Recording (New York, NY); D&D Studios (New York, NY)
- Genre: Hip hop
- Length: 58:04
- Label: Uptown; MCA
- Producer: Heavy D (exec.); DJ Premier; Jesse West; Pete Rock; Skeff Anselm; Steely & Clevie; Tony Dofat

Heavy D & The Boyz chronology
Peaceful Journey (1991)	Blue Funk (1992)	Nuttin' but Love (1994)

Singles from Blue Funk
- 1. "Who's the Man" Released: December 29, 1992; 2. "Truthful" Released: April 20, 1993

Professional ratings
Review scores
Source	Rating
AllMusic	4/5 stars
Calgary Herald	C
Encyclopedia of Popular Music	3/5 stars
Entertainment Weekly	B+
Los Angeles Times	2/4 stars
NME	7/10
RapReviews	8/10
The Source	3.5/5 stars

Blue Funk is the fourth studio album by American hip hop group Heavy D & the Boyz. It was released on December 22, 1992, via Uptown Records. The recording sessions took place at The Hit Factory, Soundtrack Studios, Axis Studios, Greene St. Recording and D&D Studios in New York. The album was produced by Jesse West, Pete Rock, Tony Dofat, DJ Premier, Skeff Anselm, Steely & Clevie, with DJ Eddie F, Heavy D, and Puff Daddy serving as executive producers. It features guest appearances from 3rd Eye, Busta Rhymes, Gang Starr, Notorious B.I.G., Phat Doug and Rob-O. The album peaked at number 40 on the Billboard 200 and number 7 on the Top R&B/Hip-Hop Albums. It was certified Gold by the Recording Industry Association of America on March 17, 1993, for selling 500,000 units in the US.

The album was supported with two singles: "Who's the Man" and "Truthful".

== Track listing ==
No.	Title	Producer(s)	Length
1.	"Truthful"	Tony Dofat	4:42
2.	"Who's the Man?"	Tony Dofat; Heavy D (co.)	4:06
3.	"Talk Is Cheap"	Skeff Anselm	4:04
4.	"Girl"	Steely & Clevie	4:58
5.	"It's a New Day"	Pete Rock	5:22
6.	"Who's in the House" (featuring Phat Doug)	Tony Dofat	4:09
7.	"Love Sexy"	Pete Rock	4:28
8.	"Slow Down"	Jesse West	4:14
9.	"Silky"	Jesse West; Heavy D (co.)	3:40
10.	"Here Comes the Heavster"	DJ Premier	4:53
11.	"Blue Funk"	Pete Rock; Heavy D (co.)	4:35
12.	"Yes Y'All"	DJ Premier	4:01
13.	"A Buncha Niggas" (featuring Busta Rhymes, 3rd Eye, Rob-O, Guru and Biggie Smalls)	Jesse West; Heavy D (co.)	5:06
Total length:			58:04

== Personnel ==
- Dwight "Heavy D." Myers — lyrics, vocals, co-producer (tracks: 2, 9, 11, 13), executive producer
- Terri Robinson — backing vocals (tracks: 1, 8, 11)
- Douglas "Fat Doug" Harriet — rap vocals (track 6)
- Tabitha Brace — backing vocals (tracks: 7, 8)
- Monica Payne — backing vocals (track 11)
- Trevor "Busta Rhymes" Smith — lyrics & rap vocals (track 13)
- Jesse "3rd Eye/Jesse West" Williams III — lyrics & rap vocals (track 13), keyboards (track 8), drums & producer (tracks: 8, 9, 13)
- Keith "GuRu" Elam — lyrics & rap vocals (track 13)
- Robert "Rob-O" Odindo — lyrics & rap vocals (track 13)
- Christopher "The Notorious B.I.G." Wallace — lyrics & rap vocals (track 13)
- Tony Dofat — keyboards & drums (tracks: 1, 6), producer (tracks: 1, 2, 6), mixing (track 2)
- Skeff Anselm — producer (track 3)
- Wycliffe "Steely" Johnson — producer (track 4)
- Cleveland "Clevie" Browne — producer (track 4)
- Peter "Pete Rock" Phillips — producer (tracks: 5, 7, 11)
- Christopher "DJ Premier" Martin — producer & mixing (tracks: 10, 12)
- Tony Maserati — recording & mixing (tracks: 1, 6), engineering (track 2)
- Tom Frites — recording assistant (track 1)
- Rich Travali — recording (track 2)
- Michael Thompson — recording assistant (track 2), mixing assistant (tracks: 3, 7)
- Jack Hersca — mixing assistant (track 2)
- David Kennedy — recording (track 3), mixing (tracks: 4, 8, 9)
- "Commissioner" Gordon Williams — recording assistant & mixing (track 3)
- Kevin Reynolds — recording (track 4)
- Doug Wilson — engineering (track 4), mixing assistant (track 7), recording assistant (tracks: 8, 9, 13)
- Lane Craven — recording & mixing (track 5)
- Jimmie Lee — engineering (track 5)
- Hiro Ishihara — recording assistant (track 6)
- Louis Alfred III — mixing assistant (track 6)
- Jamie Staub — recording (track 7)
- Lee Anthony — mixing (track 7), recording (tracks: 8, 9, 13)
- Emerson Mykoo — recording assistant (track 7)
- Francis Fletcher — mixing assistant (tracks: 8, 9, 13)
- Eddie Sancho — recording (track 10), mixing assistant (tracks: 10, 12)
- Luc Allen — recording and mixing assistant (tracks: 10, 12)
- Charles Dos Santos — recording (tracks: 11, 12), mixing (track 11)
- Scott Hollingsworth — recording and mixing assistant (track 11)
- Prince Charles Alexander — mixing (track 13)
- José L. Rodriguez — mastering (track 13)
- Sean Combs — executive producer, A&R, creative director
- Edward "DJ Eddie F" Ferrell — executive producer
- Brett Wright — creative director
- Crystal M. Johnson — production coordinator
- Danny Clinch — photography
- The Drawing Board — art direction, design

== Charts ==
Chart (1993)	Peak position
Dutch Albums (Album Top 100)	90
US Billboard 200	40
US Top R&B/Hip-Hop Albums (Billboard)	7

== Certifications ==
Region	Certification	Certified units/sales
United States (RIAA)	Gold	500,000^{^}
^{^} Shipments figures based on certification alone.
