= Waterbed Hev =

Studio album by Heavy D
- Released: April 22, 1997
- Genre: Hip hop
- Length: 44:36
- Labels: Uptown; Universal
- Producers: Heavy D; DJ Battlecat; Tony Dofat

Heavy D chronology
Nuttin' but Love (1994)	Waterbed Hev (1997)	Heavy (1999)

Singles from Waterbed Hev
- 1. "Big Daddy" Released: February 18, 1997; 2. "I'll Do Anything" Released: 1997

Waterbed Hev is the first solo album by the American rapper Heavy D. The album was released on April 22, 1997, for Uptown Records and was produced by Heavy D, DJ Battle Cat and Tony Dofat. It marked Heavy D's first album without "The Boyz", DJ Eddie F and G-Wiz. Waterbed Hev made it to No. 9 on the Billboard 200 and No. 3 on the Top R&B/Hip-Hop Albums chart, going gold in the process. Four singles were released, "Waterbed Hev", "I'll Do Anything", "Keep It Coming" (US No. 23) and "Big Daddy" (US No. 18). Guests on the album include Lost Boyz, Soul for Real and Tha Dogg Pound.

== Critical reception ==
Professional ratings
Review scores
Source	Rating
AllMusic	3/5 stars
Los Angeles Times	3/4 stars
The Source	3.5/5 stars

The Los Angeles Times wrote that "the New York rapper discovers new ways of being the sensuous, sometimes erotic romantic without ever being vulgar." Elliott Wilson, in his review for The Source, commended the album, calling it a "catchy, worthwhile listen that will stifle the non-believers".

== Track listing ==
1. "Big Daddy" - 4:09
2. "Keep It Comin'" - 4:26
3. "You Can Get It" (feat. Lost Boyz & Soul for Real) - 4:41
4. "Waterbed Hev" - 4:28
5. "Shake It" - 4:11
6. "I'll Do Anything" - 3:52
7. "Don't Be Afraid" (feat. Big Bub) - 4:14
8. "Justa' Interlude" - 1:06
9. "Can You Handle It" (feat. Tha Dogg Pound & McGruff) - 4:15
10. "Wanna Be a Player" - 2:41
11. "Get Fresh Hev" - 3:02
12. "Big Daddy" (Remix) (feat. McGruff) - 3:31

== Samples ==
- "Big Daddy (Remix)"
  - "Back to Life" by Soul II Soul
- "Don't Be Afraid"
  - "Gimme What You Got" by Le Pamplemousse
- "I'll Do Anything"
  - "I Can't Go for That (No Can Do)" by Hall & Oates
- "Keep It Coming"
  - "Yearning for Your Love" by the Gap Band
- "Wanna Be a Player"
  - "I Think I Love You" by the Partridge Family
- "Waterbed Hev"
  - "Givin' It Up Is Givin' Up" by Patrice Rushen
- "You Can Get It"
  - "Risin' to the Top" by Keni Burke
  - "Go Stetsa I" by Stetsasonic

== Certifications ==
Region	Certification	Certified units/sales
United States (RIAA)	Gold	500,000^{^}
^{^} Shipments figures based on certification alone.
