= Trouble T Roy =

American dancer (1967–1990)

Background information
- Born: Troy Dixon; October 19, 1967; Mount Vernon, New York, U.S.
- Died: July 15, 1990 (aged 22) Indianapolis, Indiana, U.S.
- Genre: Hip hop
- Occupation: Dancer
- Years active: 1987–1990
- Label: Uptown Records
- Formerly of: Heavy D & the Boyz

Troy Dixon (October 19, 1967 – July 15, 1990), better known as Trouble T Roy, was a hip-hop dancer with the group Heavy D and the Boyz from 1987 until his death in 1990.

== Death ==
On July 14, 1990, while on tour in Indianapolis, Dixon and others were playing around after a performance and walking on a raised exit ramp outside Market Square Arena. During the commotion, someone pushed a trash barrel down the ramp. Dixon got on the ledge to avoid the barrel, however he lost his balance and fell from a height of approximately two stories. He was rushed to a hospital, but died the next day of injuries he had suffered, at age 22. His death was ruled an accident.

== Legacy ==
Heavy D and the Boyz dedicated their next album, Peaceful Journey, to his memory in 1991.

Pete Rock & CL Smooth dedicated their song "They Reminisce Over You (T.R.O.Y.)" to him in 1992. Pete Rock discussed the song's genesis in a 2007 interview with The Village Voice:

I had a friend of mine that passed away, and it was a shock to the community. I was kind of depressed when I made it. And to this day, I can't believe I made it through, the way I was feeling. I guess it was for my boy. When I found the record by Tom Scott, basically I just heard something incredible that touched me and made me cry. It had such a beautiful bassline, and I started with that first. I found some other sounds and then heard some sax in there and used that. Next thing you know, I have a beautiful beat made. When I mixed the song down, I had Charlie Brown from Leaders of the New School in the session with me, and we all just started crying."

== Personal life ==
Dixon had a daughter named Tantania, who was nine months old when he died.
