= Now That We Found Love =

1973 song by the O'Jays

Song by the O'Jays

from the album Ship Ahoy
- Released: 1973
- Studio: Sigma Sound, Philadelphia, Pennsylvania
- Genre: Philadelphia soul
- Length: 4:41
- Label: Philadelphia Intl.
- Songwriter: Kenny Gamble & Leon Huff

"Now That We Found Love" (also known as "Now That We've Found Love") is a song written by Kenneth Gamble and Leon Huff and originally recorded by American R&B/soul vocal group the O'Jays for their seventh album, Ship Ahoy (1973).

== Third World version ==
"Now That We've Found Love"

Single by Third World

from the album Journey to Addis
- B-side: "Night Heat"
- Released: 1978
- Genre: Reggae; disco
- Length: 7:39 (album version); 8:14 (12" single version); 3:58 (7" radio edit)
- Label: Island
- Songwriter: Kenny Gamble & Leon Huff

Third World singles chronology
"96º in the Shade" (1977)	"Now That We've Found Love" (1978)	"Cool Meditation" (1979)

A reggae-disco hit by the reggae band Third World, this cover version was released as a single in 1978 by Island Records and peaked at number 10 in the UK. In the US, it went to number 47 on the Billboard Hot 100 and number 9 on the Hot Soul Singles chart. In Canada the song reached number 55.

== Heavy D and the Boyz version ==
"Now That We Found Love"

Single by Heavy D and the Boyz

from the album Peaceful Journey
- Released: June 11, 1991
- Genre: Hip house
- Length: 4:18
- Label: MCA; Uptown
- Songwriters: Dwight Myers; Kenny Gamble & Leon Huff
- Producer: Teddy Riley

Heavy D and the Boyz singles chronology
"Is It Good to You" (1991)	"Now That We Found Love" (1991)	"Don't Curse" (1991)

Music video
- "Now That We Found Love" on YouTube

American group Heavy D & the Boyz released their very successful dance/house cover of "Now That We Found Love" in 1991. It was produced by Teddy Riley and remains their biggest hit. The song was released in June by MCA and Uptown Records as the second single from their third album, Peaceful Journey (1991), and peaked at number two in the UK and number 11 in the US. Its music video was directed by Drew Carolan.

=== Critical reception ===
AllMusic editor Alex Henderson complimented the Heavy D & the Boyz version as "melodic", and "fun and escapist in nature". J.D. Considine from The Baltimore Sun wrote, "If the Hevster can keep serving up singles as infectious as "Now That We Found Love", he'll get few complaints." Larry Flick from Billboard magazine named it a "fab hip-house interpretation" and "an invigorating peak-hour anthem". He also noted that the producer "adds a mainstream gloss that could spark a top 40 breakthrough hit." Henderson and DeVancy for Cashbox stated that this is a song "to look out for". James Bernard from Entertainment Weekly called it a "fast-paced hip-house jam".

Zane from Melody Maker wrote, "Everything that made the original so special is lovingly reproduced with only a smattering of new noises and beats spun in. A perfect party tune." James Hamilton from Music Week named it Pick of the Week in the category of Dance, declaring it as a "jaunty singalong stereo rap". Eric Deggans from The Pittsburgh Press described it as "reggae-flavored". Martin Aston from the Record Mirror Dance Update felt that the track "has been given a bouncy, slick gloss, with a typically snappy slice of rap from the heavyweight poet." Marc Andrews from Smash Hits complimented it as "rap at its most jolly and fun-filled".

==== Retrospective response ====
In a 2021 retrospective review, Jesse Ducker from Albumism described "Now That We Found Love" as "a catchy and extremely successful pairing with producer Riley, featuring Aaron Hall's powerful vocals on the chorus. The song takes some of its inspiration from the O'Jays' song of the same name, but has the most in common with reggae group Third World's version of the track. Heavy D plays to his strengths here, celebrating the love he's cultivated and finding new ways to explore its dynamics." In 2017, BuzzFeed ranked it number 59 in their list of "The 101 Greatest Dance Songs of the '90s". Australian music channel Max included it in their list of "1000 Greatest Songs of All Time" in 2013.

=== Chart performance ===
"Now That We Found Love" reached number two in the Netherlands, Sweden and the United Kingdom. In the UK, the single peaked at number two during its fourth week on the UK Singles Chart, on July 21, 1991. On the Music Week Dance Singles chart, it reached number four. Additionally, the single entered the top 10 in Austria, Belgium, Denmark, Germany, Greece, Ireland, Norway, Spain and Switzerland, as well as on the Eurochart Hot 100, on which it peaked at number four in September 1991. Outside Europe, it peaked at number one on the Canadian RPM Dance chart in Canada, number two on the US Billboard Dance Club Play chart, and number 11 on the Billboard Hot 100. In Oceania, "Now That We Found Love" was a top-10 hit in Australia and New Zealand, peaking at numbers six and 10, respectively. "Now That We Found Love" was awarded with a gold record in the United States, denoting shipments of 500,000 singles.

=== Music video ===
The music video for "Now That We Found Love" was directed by Drew Carolan, featuring Heavy D and dancers performing in an urban backstreet. The dancers are wearing yellow raincoats. At the beginning, as the singer performs, a woman glances through a blind in her window. Later she emerges on a balcony, watching the singer. Heavy D is mostly seen wearing a red jacket, but also occasionally wears a raincoat in various colors, such as black and green. Several guys on the street are playing games with cards or dice. A DJ plays with his turntable and people are dancing. Towards the end, the woman comes walking on the street, meeting Heavy D. Then the two are walking away together from the partying crowd on the street. The video was later made available on Heavy D's official YouTube channel in 2009, and had generated more than 60 million views as of October 2025.

=== Track listings ===
12-inch single, US (1991)
No.	Title	Length
1.	"Now That We Found Love" (club version)	5:44
2.	"Now That We Found Love" (7-inch radio)	4:16
3.	"Now That We Found Love" (instrumental)	5:21

CD single, Europe (1991)
No.	Title	Length
1.	"Now That We Found Love" (7-inch radio)	4:16
2.	"Now That We Found Love" (club version)	5:44
3.	"Now That We Found Love" (instrumental)	5:21

CD maxi, Japan (1991)
No.	Title	Length
1.	"Now That We Found Love" (Morales remix)	8:21
2.	"Now That We Found Love" (Morales bass remix)	5:20
3.	"Now That We Found Love" (Morales heavy-less remix)	5:32
4.	"Now That We Found Love" (Morales luv remix)	5:14
5.	"Now That We Found Love" (Morales instrumental)	5:29

=== Charts ===
==== Weekly charts ====
Chart (1991)	Peak position
Australia (ARIA)	6
Austria (Ö3 Austria Top 40)	8
Belgium (Ultratop 50 Flanders)	5
Canada Top Singles (RPM)	83
Canada Dance/Urban (RPM)	1
Denmark (IFPI)	3
Europe (Eurochart Hot 100)	4
Europe (European Hit Radio)	8
Finland (Suomen virallinen lista)	15
France (SNEP)	39
Germany (GfK)	4
Greece (IFPI)	5
Ireland (IRMA)	6
Luxembourg (Radio Luxembourg)	2
Netherlands (Dutch Top 40)	2
Netherlands (Single Top 100)	2
New Zealand (Recorded Music NZ)	10
Norway (VG-lista)	6
Spain (AFYVE)	5
Sweden (Sverigetopplistan)	2
Switzerland (Schweizer Hitparade)	4
UK Singles (Official Charts)	2
UK Airplay (Music Week)	14
UK Dance (Music Week)	4
UK Club Chart (Record Mirror)	5
US Billboard Hot 100	11
US 12-inch Singles Sales (Billboard)	1
US Dance Club Play (Billboard)	2
US Hot R&B Singles (Billboard)	5
US Hot Rap Singles (Billboard)	4
US Cash Box Top 100	27

Chart (2011)	Peak position
Japan (Japan Hot 100)	70

==== Year-end charts ====
Chart (1991)	Position
Australia (ARIA)	47
Belgium (Ultratop)	34
Canada Dance/Urban (RPM)	8
Europe (Eurochart Hot 100)	20
Europe (European Hit Radio)	46
Germany (Media Control)	29
Netherlands (Dutch Top 40)	12
Netherlands (Single Top 100)	20
Sweden (Topplistan)	14
Switzerland (Schweizer Hitparade)	28
UK Singles (OCC)	24
UK Club Chart (Record Mirror)	48
US Billboard Hot 100	67
US 12-inch Singles Sales (Billboard)	7
US Dance Club Play (Billboard)	14
US Hot R&B Singles (Billboard)	80

=== Certifications ===
Region	Certification	Certified units/sales
United States (RIAA)	Gold	500,000^{^}
^{^} Shipments figures based on certification alone.

=== Release history ===
Region	Date	Format(s)	Label(s)	Ref.
United States	June 11, 1991	—N/a	MCA; Uptown	
Australia	July 22, 1991	12-inch vinyl; cassette	MCA	
Japan	December 4, 1991	CD	MCA	
