= All Souled Out =

EP by Pete Rock & CL Smooth
- Released: June 25, 1991
- Studios: Greene St. Recording (New York, NY)
- Genre: Golden age hip hop
- Length: 29:09
- Labels: Elektra; 61175
- Producers: Dante Ross (exec.); Eddie F (exec.); Raoul Roach (exec.); Pete Rock

Pete Rock & CL Smooth chronology
All Souled Out (1991)	Mecca and the Soul Brother (1992)

Professional ratings
Review scores
Source	Rating
AllMusic	4.5/5 stars
Christgau's Consumer Guide	(neither)
The Rolling Stone Album Guide	4/5 stars
Tom Hull – on the Web	B+

All Souled Out is the debut EP by Pete Rock & CL Smooth. It was released in the summer of 1991 to rave reviews and spawned a modest hit in "The Creator".

After participation in the production and/or remixes of songs by various hip hop and R&B artists in the late 1980s to early 1990s, the duo signed to Elektra Records. All Souled Out was a warm up to their debut album, Mecca and the Soul Brother. All the rapping on the album is performed by C.L. Smooth with the exception of "The Creator", a Pete Rock solo track. A deluxe edition of All Souled Out was released on February 18, 2014 on Traffic Entertainment Group, featuring the original 6 EP tracks, along with remix and instrumental versions of "The Creator" & "Mecca & the Soul Brother".

The first single "The Creator" was featured in the opening credits of the 2015 Christmas film, The Night Before.

== Track listing ==
No.	Title	Length
1.	"Good Life"	3:53
2.	"Mecca & the Soul Brother"	5:59
3.	"Go With the Flow"	4:55
4.	"The Creator"	4:43
5.	"All Souled Out"	5:27
6.	"Good Life" (Group Home Mix)"	3:55 2014 Deluxe Edition: 7. The Creator (Slide To The Side Mix) 4:45 8. The Creator (Surfboard Mix) 4:45 9. The Creator (Instrumental) 4:45 10. Mecca & The Soul Brother (Wig Out Mix) 6:42; 11. Mecca & The Soul Brother (Wig Out Instrumental) 6:30

== Album singles ==
Single information
"The Creator"
- Released: 1991
- B-side: "Mecca And The Soul Brother"

== Charts ==
Chart (1992)	Peak position
US Top R&B/Hip-Hop Albums (Billboard)	30
