= They Reminisce Over You (T.R.O.Y.) =

Single by Pete Rock & CL Smooth

from the album Mecca and the Soul Brother
- Released: April 2, 1992
- Recorded: 1991
- Genre: Golden age hip hop; jazz rap
- Length: 4:45
- Label: Untouchables; Elektra
- Songwriters: Peter Phillips; Corey Penn
- Producer: Pete Rock

Pete Rock & CL Smooth singles chronology
"The Creator" (1991)	"They Reminisce Over You (T.R.O.Y.)" (1992)	"Straighten It Out" (1992)

Audio sample
- file; help

Music video
- "They Reminisce Over You (T.R.O.Y.)" on YouTube

"They Reminisce Over You (T.R.O.Y.)" is a song by Pete Rock & CL Smooth, inspired by the death of their close friend Troy Dixon (better known as "Trouble" T. Roy of Heavy D & the Boyz) in 1990. The song was the lead single off their debut album, Mecca and the Soul Brother, released in 1992, and later became a staple of early 1990s hip hop. The song peaked at #58 on the Billboard Hot 100 and #1 on the Hot Rap Tracks chart. The song contains a sample from "Today" from the album The Honeysuckle Breeze (1967) by Tom Scott and the California Dreamers, originally performed by Jefferson Airplane.

"They Reminisce Over You (T.R.O.Y.)" is frequently ranked among the greatest hip-hop songs of all time and a classic of Hip Hop's golden era.

== Background and composition ==
Pete Rock has stated that the song was inspired by death of their friend Troy Dixon (better known as “Trouble T-Roy", a dancer in Heavy D & the Boyz) in 1990. Dixon had fallen off a raised exit ramp while on tour in Indianapolis with Heavy D & the Boyz. While he initially survived the fall, he died later at the hospital. The incident had deeply affected both Pete Rock and CL Smooth and inspired them to write the song in his memory.

Pete Rock in a 2007 interview with The Village Voice:

I had a friend of mine that passed away, and it was a shock to the community. I was kind of depressed when I made it. And to this day, I can't believe I made it through, the way I was feeling. I guess it was for my boy. When I found the record by Tom Scott, basically I just heard something incredible that touched me and made me cry. It had such a beautiful bassline, and I started with that first. I found some other sounds and then heard some sax in there and used that. Next thing you know, I have a beautiful beat made. When I mixed the song down, I had Charlie Brown from Leaders of the New School in the session with me, and we all just started crying.

== Legacy ==
"They Reminisce Over You (T.R.O.Y.)" has since appeared on lists such as Q Magazine's "1001 Best Songs Ever", Spin Magazine's "Top 20 Singles of the 90s", and The Source's "100 Best Rap Singles Of All Time". It was voted #6 in About.com's Top 100 Rap Songs. It was also number 90 on VH1's 100 Greatest Songs of Hip Hop. Pitchfork included the song at #35 on their Top 200 Tracks of the 90s.

Rolling Stone magazine ranked the song #12 on its list of "The 50 Greatest Hip-Hop Songs of All Time." It was also ranked #430 on its "The 500 Greatest Songs of All Time" in 2021.

In 2012, Lupe Fiasco's song "Around My Way (Freedom Ain't Free)" from Food & Liquor II: The Great American Rap Album Pt. 1 used the same sample from "Today" that "They Reminisce Over You" did. In response, Pete Rock said he felt "violated." Fiasco further references the song in the title of the final track of Tetsuo & Youth, "They.Resurrect.Over.New (T.R.O.N.)."

== Track listing ==
Side A

1. "They Reminisce Over You (T.R.O.Y.)"
2. "They Reminisce Over You (T.R.O.Y.)" (instrumental)
3. "The Creator (Slide to the Side Remix)"

Side B

1. "The Creator (Slide to the Side Remix)" (instrumental)
2. "Creator" (EP mix)
3. "Creator" (EP mix) (instrumental)
