= Heavy (Heavy D album) =

Studio album by Heavy D
- Released: June 15, 1999
- Genre: Hip hop
- Length: 45:10
- Label: Uptown; Universal
- Producer: Heavy D; Tony Dofat; Erick Sermon; Jay Dee; Q-Tip

Heavy D chronology
Waterbed Hev (1997)	Heavy (1999)	Vibes (2008)

Singles from Heavy
- 1. "Don't Stop" Released: 1999; 2. "On Point" Released: 1999

Heavy is the second album by the rapper Heavy D, released in 1999 via Uptown Records. It was produced by Heavy D, Tony Dofat, Erick Sermon, Jay Dee and Q-Tip. The album peaked at No. 60 on the Billboard 200 and No. 10 on the Top R&B/Hip-Hop Albums chart. It is Heavy D's lowest-selling album.

Guests on the album include Cee-Lo, Q-Tip, Chico DeBarge, Big Pun and Eightball. Two music videos were made: "Don't Stop" (directed by Diane Martel) and "On Point" f/Big Pun & Eightball.

== Critical reception ==
Professional ratings
Review scores
Source	Rating
AllMusic	3/5 stars
The Encyclopedia of Popular Music	3/5 stars
The Source	4/5 stars

The Village Voice called the album "closer to Bowie’s Low than to P.M. Dawn, elegiac tone poems like 'Ask Heaven' and 'Dancin’ in the Night' stretch rap’s definition well beyond typical r&b structures." The Orlando Sentinel wrote that "the New Yorker's production contains a winning combination of rocklike, sultry and R&B tracks." The New Pittsburgh Courier deemed it D's "most personal album to date," writing that "the range of topics and themes go from 'go-for-yours' party jams to songs dealing with grief, loss and pain."

== Track listing ==
1. "Like Dat Dhere"- 3:37
2. "Imagine That"- 3:51
3. "You Know" feat, Cee-Lo- 3:51
4. "Listen" feat. Q-Tip- 3:26
5. "Don't Stop"- 4:03
6. "Dancin' in the Night"- 4:15
7. "Ask Heaven" feat. Chico DeBarge- 4:36
8. "On Point" feat. Big Pun & 8 Ball- 4:37
9. "Spanish Fly"- 3:39
10. "I Know You Love Me"- 2:16
11. "I Don't Think So"- 3:34
12. "You Nasty Hev"- 3:25

== Samples ==
"Listen" samples "Fly Like an Eagle" by Steve Miller Band

"Don't Stop" samples "Look Alike" by Bob James

"Ask Heaven" samples "Stairway to Heaven" by Led Zeppelin

"On Point" samples "You Make Me Feel Like This (When You Touch Me)" by Love Unlimited Orchestra

"You Nasty Hev" samples "La Di Da Di" by Doug E. Fresh & Slick Rick
