= The Main Ingredient (Pete Rock & CL Smooth album) =

Studio album by Pete Rock & CL Smooth
- Released: November 8, 1994
- Recorded: 1993–1994
- Studio: Greene St. Recording in New York City
- Genres: East Coast hip hop; golden age hip hop; jazz rap
- Length: 76:13
- Labels: Elektra; 61661
- Producer: Pete Rock & CL Smooth

Pete Rock & CL Smooth chronology
Mecca and the Soul Brother (1992)	The Main Ingredient (1994)	Soul Survivor (1998)

Singles from The Main Ingredient
- 1. "I Got a Love" Released: 1994; 2. "Take You There" Released: 1994; 3. "Searching" Released: 1995

The Main Ingredient is the second album by Pete Rock & CL Smooth, released on November 8, 1994. It is the duo's last studio album to date.

== Music ==
Characterized by sultry soul and jazz samples, The Main Ingredient saw a more polished sound than the duo's debut, building on the praise that they had already garnered. The album is notable for its snappy, crispy drums and extensive use of vocal scratches, usually from songs by Biz Markie. Although missing a centerpiece on the scale of "They Reminisce Over You (T.R.O.Y.)", the album contains some of the duo's best known work, in the form of tracks such as the upbeat "In The House", and the catchy "Sun Won't Come Out", which features a lush vocal sample from the song of the same name by Harvey Scales.

Continuing a theme initiated by Mecca and the Soul Brother, brief instrumental interludes are placed at the beginning and end of songs. With the exception of just a few tracks, this feature is recurrent throughout the album. In addition, The Main Ingredient saw Rock fleshing out and defining his trademark production style, which is now recognized for often containing smooth basslines, swirling horns, filtered samples, and spacious grooves. The production on this album proved to be influential upon a legion of latter day producers.

== Reception ==
Professional ratings
Review scores
Source	Rating
AllMusic	4/5 stars
Encyclopedia of Popular Music	4/5 stars
Q	3/5 stars
RapReviews	9/10
The Rolling Stone Album Guide	4/5 stars
The Source	4/5 stars

Though overlooked at the time of its release, the album has since been re-evaluated with high critical acclaim. AllMusic's Stanton Swihart called it "an album that is far more focused" and "just as good as the first record, perhaps an even more satisfying single listen." Swihart described Rock's production work as "among some of the most seductive in hip-hop", and CL as "lyrically on point, spitting out intellectual rhymes and narratives that are just as propulsive and engaging as the music."

"I Got A Love" was the album's lead off single, followed by "Take You There" and "Searching", released in 1995. That same year, the duo appeared in a well received Sprite commercial; however, they soon announced their breaking up citing creative differences, although both parties have since admitted that an unstable working relationship was the main cause of their split. The album was a favorite of the late producer J Dilla, who played it while meeting with Pete Rock to record Slum Village's "Once Upon A Time" for the album, Fantastic, Vol. 2 in 1998.

== Track listing ==
All tracks produced by Pete Rock & CL Smooth

No.	Title	Performer(s)	Length
1.	"In the House"	Samples • First verse: C.L. Smooth • Second verse: Pete Rock • Third verse: C.L. Smooth	5:27
2.	"Carmel City"	• C.L. Smooth	3:52
3.	"I Get Physical"	• Verses: C.L. Smooth • Chorus: Pete Rock	4:54
4.	"Sun Won't Come Out"	• Verses: C.L. Smooth • Chorus: Pete Rock	4:24
5.	"I Got a Love"	• C.L. Smooth	5:04
6.	"Escape"	• Pete Rock	5:14
7.	"The Main Ingredient"	• Intro: Pete Rock • Verses: C.L. Smooth • Chorus: Pete Rock	5:17
8.	"Worldwide"	• First verse: Rob-O • Second verse: Pete Rock • Third verse: Rob-O • Fourth verse: Pete Rock	3:02
9.	"All the Places"	• Intro: Pete Rock • Verses: C.L. Smooth • Chorus: Pete Rock	5:39
10.	"Tell Me"	• C.L. Smooth	4:17
11.	"Take You There"	• Verses: C.L. Smooth • Chorus/outro: Crystal Johnson	4:47
12.	"Searching"	• Verses: C.L. Smooth • Chorus: Vinia Mojica	4:45
13.	"Check It Out"	• C.L. Smooth	3:57
14.	"In the Flesh"	• Intro: Deda and Pete Rock • First verse: C.L. Smooth • Second verse: Rob-O • Third verse: Deda • Fourth verse: Pete Rock	5:48
15.	"It's on You"	• Verses: C.L. Smooth • Chorus: Pete Rock • Outro: Pete Rock and Grap Luva	5:21
16.	"Get on the Mic"	• Verses: C.L. Smooth • Chorus: Pete Rock	3:50
Total length:			76:13

== Album singles ==
Single information
"I Got a Love"
- Released: 1994
- B-side: "The Main Ingredient"
"Take You There"
- Released: 1994
- B-side: "Get On The Mic"
"Searching"
- Released: 1995
- B-side: "We Specialize"

== Chart history ==
=== Album ===
Chart (1994)	Peak position
US Billboard 200	51
US Top R&B/Hip-Hop Albums (Billboard)	9

=== Singles ===
Year	Song	Chart positions			
Year	Song	Billboard Hot 100	Hot R&B/Hip-Hop Singles & Tracks	Hot Rap Singles	Hot Dance Music/Maxi-Singles Sales
1994	I Got a Love	-	69	20	2
1994/1995	Take You There	76	67	33	9

== Bibliography ==
- Larkin, Colin, ed. (2002). Encyclopedia of Popular Music (4th ed.). Muze UK. ISBN 1-85227-923-0.
