= Mecca and the Soul Brother =

Studio album by Pete Rock & CL Smooth
- Released: June 9, 1992
- Studio: Greene St. Recording (Manhattan, New York)
- Genre: East Coast hip hop; golden age hip hop; jazz rap; alternative hip hop
- Length: 77:23 (CD); 85:14 (2xLP/MC)
- Label: Elektra
- Producer: Pete Rock & CL Smooth; Nevelle Hodge; Large Professor

Pete Rock & CL Smooth chronology
All Souled Out (1991)	Mecca and the Soul Brother (1992)	The Main Ingredient (1994)

Singles from Mecca and the Soul Brother
- 1. "They Reminisce Over You (T.R.O.Y.)" Released: April 2, 1992; 2. "Straighten It Out" Released: 1992; 3. "Lots of Lovin'" Released: February 1993

Mecca and the Soul Brother is the 1992 debut album from hip-hop duo Pete Rock & CL Smooth. The album contains their best known song, "They Reminisce Over You (T.R.O.Y.)". Mecca and the Soul Brother has been widely acclaimed as one of the greatest hip hop albums of all time. The album was mostly produced by Pete Rock and executive produced by DJ Eddie F of Heavy D & the Boyz (co-group member with Trouble T-Roy).

== Composition ==
Other topics on the album range from life in the ghetto ("Ghettos of the Mind"), the teachings of the Nation of Islam ("Anger in the Nation"), bootlegging ("Straighten It Out"), and love ("Lots of Lovin'").

== Release and commercial performance ==
Mecca and the Soul Brother was released soon after the duo's debut EP, All Souled Out (1991). Despite being a critical success, Mecca and the Soul Brother had little commercial success in comparison to other noteworthy releases of 1992, such as Dr. Dre's The Chronic. The first single, "They Reminisce Over You (T.R.O.Y.)", a dedication to their deceased friend; Trouble T Roy (a dance member of Heavy D. & The Boyz), has gone on to become not only their signature song, but also one of hip hop's most highly regarded songs.

"Straighten It Out" is the second single taken from The Main Ingredient, which was released to critical acclaim in 1992. The song deals with bootleggers and sample clearance opportunists. Unlike the previous single, "They Reminisce Over You (T.R.O.Y.)", "Straighten It Out" did not chart on the Billboard Hot 100. The song contains a sample from "Our Generation" by Ernie Hines.

The third and final single, "Lots of Lovin'", was released in 1995. This is a downtempo and mellow song about relationships, with singer Vinia Mojica performing the chorus. Released just prior to the breakup of the group, the song received very little promotion. It was remixed and re-released at the beginning of 1996. The song features samples from the Roy Ayers song "Searching".

== Reception ==
Professional ratings
Review scores
Source	Rating
AllMusic	5/5 stars
Encyclopedia of Popular Music	4/5 stars
Entertainment Weekly	C+
RapReviews	9.5/10
The Rolling Stone Album Guide	5/5 stars
The Source	4/5 stars

Mecca and the Soul Brother brought considerable acclaim to the duo. They were often compared to the group Gang Starr, which also featured one MC, and a producer/DJ. Although the album garnered a great amount of acclaim, sales were slow. The group only grew more popular, however, and next appeared on the Menace II Society soundtrack, followed by Who's the Man? and Poetic Justice respectively, before returning in 1994 with The Main Ingredient.

=== Accolades ===
Publication	Country	Accolade	Year	Rank
About.com	United States	100 Greatest Hip-Hop Albums	2008	37
Ego Trip	United States	Hip Hop's Greatest Albums by Year: 1992	1999	8
Exclaim!	Canada	100 Records that Rocked 100 Issues	2000	*
Rolling Stone	United States	The Essential Recordings of the 90s	1999	*
Rolling Stone	United States	The 200 Greatest Hip-Hop Albums of All Time	2022	130
The Source	United States	The 100 Best Rap Albums of All Time	1998	*
Mojo	UK	Mojo 1000, the Ultimate CD Buyers Guide	2001	*
(*) designates lists that are unordered.

== Track listing ==
- All tracks produced by Pete Rock & CL Smooth, except #4 co-produced by Nevelle Hodge and #5 co-produced by Large Professor.

#	Title	Performer(s)	Time
1	"Return of the Mecca"	Intro: Pete Rock; Verses: C.L. Smooth; Chorus: Pete Rock	5:42
2	"For Pete's Sake"	Intro: Pete Rock; First verse: C.L. Smooth; Second verse: Pete Rock; Third verse: C.L. Smooth; Outro: Pete Rock	5:48
3	"Ghettos of the Mind"	C.L. Smooth	5:01
4	"Lots of Lovin'"	Verses: C.L. Smooth; Chorus: Terri Robinson / Tabitha Brace	5:07
5	"Act Like You Know"	Verses: C.L. Smooth; Chorus: Pete Rock	4:01
6	"Straighten It Out"	C.L. Smooth	4:12
7	"Soul Brother #1"	Pete Rock	4:30
8	"Wig Out"	Intro: Pete Rock; Verses: C.L. Smooth	4:10
9	"Anger in the Nation"	Intro: Adofo Abdullah Muhammad; Verses: C.L. Smooth	5:31
10	"They Reminisce Over You (T.R.O.Y.)"	C.L. Smooth	4:44
11	"On and On"	Intro: Grap Luva; Verses: C.L. Smooth	5:10
12	"It's Like That"	Intro: Pete Rock; Verses: C.L. Smooth	3:55
13	"Can't Front on Me"	Intro: Pete Rock; Verses: C.L. Smooth	4:18
14	"The Basement"	First verse: C.L. Smooth; Second verse: Grap Luva; Third verse: Heavy D; Fourth verse: Pete Rock; Fifth verse: Rob-O; Sixth verse: Deda	5:22
15	"If It Ain't Rough, It Ain't Right"	C.L. Smooth	5:04
16	"Skinz"	First verse: C.L. Smooth; Second verse: Grand Puba; Third verse: C.L. Smooth; Fourth verse: Pete Rock; Fifth verse: C.L. Smooth	4:14

Notes

- The cassette and 2xLP versions contain two bonus tracks: "The Creator (Remix)" and "Mecca and the Soul Brother (Remix)"
- (*) Symbolizes co-producer

== Album singles ==
Single information
"They Reminisce Over You (T.R.O.Y.)"
- Released: 1992
- B-side: "The Creator"
"Straighten It Out"
- Released: 1992
- B-side: "They Reminisce Over You (T.R.O.Y.) (Remix)"
"Lots of Lovin'"
- Released: February 1993
- B-side: "It's Not A Game"

== Chart history ==
=== Album ===
Chart (1992)	Peak position
US Billboard 200	43
US Top R&B/Hip-Hop Albums (Billboard)	7

=== Singles ===
Year	Song	Chart positions			
Year	Song	Billboard Hot 100	Hot R&B/Hip-Hop Singles & Tracks	Hot Rap Singles	Hot Dance Music/Maxi-Singles Sales
1992	They Reminisce Over You [T.R.O.Y.]	58	10	1	20
1992	Straighten It Out	-	65	7	37
1993	Lots of Lovin'	-	66	1	-

== In popular culture ==
The first single "They Reminisce Over You (T.R.O.Y.)" appeared in the 2003 video game NBA Street Vol. 2, the 2011 video game Madden NFL 12 and NBA 2K18, as well as in the Netflix series Master of None. All of the episode titles of the season 2 of Luke Cage are titles of songs from this album. The song "Soul Brother #1" appeared in the video game Tony Hawk's Underground 2.
