= Pete Rock & CL Smooth =

American hip hop duo

- CL Smooth (left) and Pete Rock (right) in 1994

Background information
- Also known as: PR & CL
- Origin: Mount Vernon, New York, U.S.
- Genres: East Coast hip hop; jazz rap
- Years active: 1989–1995; 1998; 2001; 2004; 2010–2018
- Labels: Elektra; Untouchables
- Past members: Pete Rock; CL Smooth

Pete Rock & CL Smooth were an American hip hop duo formed in Mount Vernon, New York. They made their debut with their 1991 EP, All Souled Out and followed by the 1992 LP Mecca and the Soul Brother.

== History ==
=== Formation ===
Pete Rock (Peter Phillips) and CL Smooth (Corey Penn) first met at Mount Vernon High School. They began shopping demos to labels until Elektra Records signed the duo to a production deal with The Untouchables management, which was handled by DJ Eddie F. The duo released their first EP All Souled Out on June 25, 1991.

=== Early years ===
As a producer, DJ Pete Rock gained notoriety for his use of obscure soul and jazz records, frequently making use of horn-driven hooks. Lead vocalist CL Smooth delivered more conscious style of rap which contrasted with the popular gangsta rap records of the time. He mostly avoided profanity, similar in style and delivery to positive East Coast rappers like those associated with the Native Tongues Crew. Their debut album, Mecca and the Soul Brother was released on June 9, 1992. Their signature hit was "They Reminisce Over You (T.R.O.Y.)", a requiem for fallen friends — namely Troy "Trouble T-Roy" Dixon, a member of Heavy D & The Boyz, who died in 1990.

=== Later years ===
While touring in London with CL Smooth in early December 2011, Pete Rock stated that a new album was already in the works and would be released by the year's end, or as soon as it was completed. The album would have been the duo's third album, and their first album since 1994's The Main Ingredient.

On June 1, 2024, during an interview with Drink Champs, Rock addressed the split between him and CL Smooth:

“It should never be like this. Ever. We should still be together but some things, you know, that I can’t tell the whole public. But certain things happen in a partnership that just can’t be… and people won’t understand. I don’t want to be the only one speaking on someone who’s not here, but I wish him the best in life."

Rock continued in an Instagram post about the breakup:

"This goes for anybody once in a group with a partner or partners. When things go left, take the high road. You have people who rejoice separation! When I make my business my business, people start making up their own story cuz it’s nobody’s business but mine's plain & simple like it or don’t. You have people who tell their stories no problem and be on dem podcast talkin bout personal problems, that's not me mayne! F**k drama. That sh*t happened, that's my business. Let people say and think what they want. Ignorance is bliss and real ones know this but don't believe groups stay 4ever. That only happens when 2 men really respect one another and their boundaries and has had similar experiences happen to them and it gives each individual great understanding. That's the important part! But I wish no ill will on CL Smooth but I kept telling y'all for years I have moved on with all due respect. I can accept it."

== Discography ==
=== Studio albums ===
Year	Album	Peak chart positions	
Year	Album	U.S.	U.S. R&B
1992	Mecca and the Soul Brother: Released: June 9, 1992; Label: Elektra	43	7
1994	The Main Ingredient: Released: November 8, 1994; Label: Elektra	51	9

=== EPs ===
Year	Album	Peak chart positions
Year	Album	U.S. R&B
1991	All Souled Out: Released: June 25, 1991; Label: Elektra	53
2009	The Basement Demos: Released: February 17, 2009; Label: One Leg Up Records	—

=== Soundtracks ===
- April 1993: Who's the Man?: Original Motion Picture Soundtrack – track 3, "What's Next on the Menu?"
- May 1993: Menace II Society: The Original Motion Picture Soundtrack – track 10, "Death Becomes You"
- June 1993: Poetic Justice: Music from the Motion Picture – track 6, "One in a Million"

=== Compilations ===
- 2003: Good Life: The Best of Pete Rock & CL Smooth

=== Singles ===
Year	Single	Chart positions			Album
Year	Single	U.S. Hot 100	U.S. R&B	U.S. Rap	Album
1992	"Straighten It Out"	—	65	7	Mecca and the Soul Brother
1992	"They Reminisce Over You (T.R.O.Y.)"	58	10	1	Mecca and the Soul Brother
1992	"Lots of Lovin'"	108	66	1	Mecca and the Soul Brother
1994	"I Got a Love"	117	69	20	The Main Ingredient
1994	"Take You There (featuring Crystal Johnson)"	76	67	33	The Main Ingredient
1995	"Searching"	—	—	—	The Main Ingredient
