= Heavy D =

American musician and actor (1967–2011)

- Heavy D in 1991
- Born: Dwight Arrington Myers; May 24, 1967; Mandeville, Manchester, Jamaica
- Died: November 8, 2011 (aged 44); Los Angeles, California, U.S.
- Occupations: Rapper; record producer; songwriter; singer; actor
- Years active: 1986–2011
- Partner: Antonia Lofaso (1998–2011; his death)
- Children: 1
- Relatives: Pete Rock (cousin)
- Musical career
- Origin: Mount Vernon, New York, U.S.
- Genres: Pop rap; R&B
- Instrument: Vocals
- Labels: Uptown; MCA
- Formerly of: Heavy D & the Boyz

Dwight Arrington Myers (May 24, 1967 – November 8, 2011), known professionally as Heavy D, was a Jamaican-American rapper, record producer, and actor. He was the leader of Heavy D & the Boyz, a group that included dancers/hype men G-Whiz (Glen Parrish) and "Trouble" T. Roy (Troy Dixon), as well as DJ and producer Eddie F (Edward Ferrell). The group maintained a sizeable audience in the United States through most of the 1990s. The five albums the group released included production mainly by Teddy Riley, Marley Marl, DJ Premier, Myers's cousin Pete Rock, and "in-house" beatmaker Eddie F. Myers also released four solo albums and discovered Soul for Real and Monifah.

== Early life ==
Dwight Arrington Myers was born on May 24, 1967, in Mandeville, Manchester, Jamaica, the son of nurse Eulahlee Lee and machine technician Clifford Vincent Myers. In the early 1970s, his family moved to Mount Vernon, New York, where he was raised. In an interview, his mother stated that he spent most of his childhood hanging out with his brother, Floyd, and his friend, Mo.

== Career ==
Heavy D & the Boyz was the first group signed to Uptown Records, with Heavy D as the front man and only rapper. Eddie F was his business partner in the group, DJ, and one of the producers. The other two members, T-Roy and G-Wiz were the dancers. Their debut, Living Large, was released in 1987. The album was a commercial success. Big Tyme was a breakthrough that included four hits. "Trouble T. Roy" died at age 22 in a fall on July 15, 1990, in Indianapolis. Dixon's death led to a tribute on the follow-up platinum album, Peaceful Journey. Pete Rock & CL Smooth created a tribute to Trouble T. Roy called "They Reminisce Over You (T.R.O.Y.)" which is regarded as a hip hop classic.

In 1989, Heavy D performed a guest rap on Janet Jackson's hit single "Alright", an early example of rap appearances on pop songs. It was also the highest peaking song which he had performed on in the Billboard Hot 100. In 1992, he appeared on Michael Jackson's single "Jam", and also gained a higher profile by singing the theme song for the television program In Living Color and also MADtv. He also collaborated with Jamaican DJ Super Cat on the hit track "Dem No Worry We."

Heavy D then began focusing on his acting, appearing in various television shows before returning to the music charts with Nuttin' But Love. After appearing in the off-Broadway play Riff Raff at Circle Repertory Company, Heavy D returned to recording with the hit Waterbed Hev. In 1997, Heavy D collaborated with B.B. King on his duets album Deuces Wild, rapping in the song "Keep It Coming". Heavy D was referred to in the song "Juicy" by the Notorious B.I.G., and appeared in his music video for "One More Chance". Heavy D & The Boyz were also referenced by American rapper Eminem in his single "Rap God".

While still an artist at Uptown Records, Myers was instrumental in convincing Andre Harrell to originally hire Sean "Diddy" Combs for his first music business gig as an intern. He became the president of Uptown Records. During this time, Myers also developed the boy band Soul for Real, and was the executive producer and principal writer of several songs on the group's breakout album, Candy Rain. He later became senior vice president at Universal Music. As an actor, Heavy D is perhaps best known for his role in the 1999 drama film The Cider House Rules, where he plays a migrant worker. He fathered a daughter in 2000 with Antonia Lofaso, an American Celebrity Chef and restaurateur.

== Death ==
Heavy D's final live performance was with Eddie F at the BET Hip Hop Awards on October 11, 2011, their first live televised performance together in 15 years. Myers died less than a month later on November 8, in Los Angeles, California, at the age of 44. He collapsed outside his home in Beverly Hills, California, and was taken to Cedars-Sinai Medical Center. His death was initially thought to be connected to pneumonia. An autopsy report, released on December 27, 2011, stated that the cause of death was a pulmonary embolism (PE) caused by a blood clot in a leg; he had also suffered from heart disease. Craig Harvey, chief of the Los Angeles County Department of Coroner, said that the blood clot that resulted in the PE was "most likely formed during an extended airplane ride". Heavy D had recently returned from a trip to Cardiff, where he performed at a Michael Jackson tribute concert.

Shortly after his death, MC Hammer and others paid tribute to Heavy D on Twitter. Hammer tweeted that, "We had a lot of great times touring together. He had a heart of gold. He was a part of what's good about the world." His funeral was held at Grace Baptist Church in his hometown of Mount Vernon, New York. He was buried at Ferncliff Cemetery in Hartsdale, New York.

== Discography ==
With Heavy D and The Boyz

- Living Large (1987)
- Big Tyme (1989)
- Peaceful Journey (1991)
- Blue Funk (1992)
- Nuttin' but Love (1994)

Solo albums

- Waterbed Hev (1997)
- Heavy (1999)
- Vibes (2008)
- Love Opus (2011)

== Filmography ==
=== Film ===
Year	Title	Role	Notes
1993	Who's the Man?	Himself	
1995	New Jersey Drive	Bo-Kane	
1997	B*A*P*S	Himself	
1997	The Deli	Bo	
1999	Life	Jake	
1999	The Cider House Rules	Peaches	
2000	Next Afternoon		Short
2002	Big Trouble	FBI Agent Pat Greer	
2003	Black Listed	Frankie	Video
2003	Dallas 362	Bear	
2004	Larceny	Charles	
2006	Step Up	Omar	
2011	Tower Heist	Court House Guard	
2012	H4	Archbishop Scroop	Posthumous release

=== Television ===
Year	Title	Role	Notes
1989	A Different World	Himself	Episode: "Delusions of Daddyhood"
1990	The Fresh Prince of Bel-Air	Himself	Episode: "Someday Your Prince Will Be in Effect: Part 2"
1992	Booker	Fatz Turner	Episode: "Mobile Home"
1992	Tales from the Crypt	Farouche	Episode: "On a Deadman's Chest"
1993	Roc	Calvin Hendricks	Recurring cast: season 2–3
1994–96	Living Single	Darryl	Recurring cast: season 2, guest: season 4
1996	Waynehead	Himself (voice)	Episode: "Botswana Aki and the Hydrant of Doom"
1997	Happily Ever After: Fairy Tales for Every Child	Drexel (voice)	Episode: "The Golden Goose"
1999	Martial Law	Gordon Ganza	Episode: "This Shogun for Hire"
2000	For Your Love	Dexter	Episode: "The Accidental Doctor"
2000–03	Boston Public	Bob 'Big Boy' Lick	Recurring cast: season 1–3
2003–04	The Tracy Morgan Show	Bernard	Main cast
2005	Yes, Dear	Charlie	Episode: "Barbecue"
2005	Bones	Sid Shapiro	Recurring cast: Season 1
2011	Are We There Yet?	Craig	Episode: "The Mr. Almost Episode"
2011	Law & Order: Special Victims Unit	Supreme	Episode: "Personal Fouls"
2011	House of Payne	P-Rock	Episode: “Dream girls”

== Sampling ==
- "We Got Our Own Thang" – James Brown "Funky President", James Brown "My Thang", CJ & Co "We Got Our Own Thing"
- "You A'int Heard Nuttin' Yet" – James Brown "It's a Man's Man's World", Lyn Collins "Think", Grover Washington, Jr. "Mr. Magic"
- "More Bounce" – Parliament, "Tear the Roof Off the Sucker (We Want the Funk)", Zapp "More Bounce to the Ounce"
- "Somebody for Me" – Big Daddy Kane, "Word to the Motherland"
- "The Overweight Lover's In The House" – JB's, "Pass the Peas"
- "A Better Land" – Main Ingredient, "Everybody Plays the Fool"
- "Peaceful Journey" - The Jacksons, "This Place Hotel (A/K/A: Heartbreak Hotel)"
- "The Lover's Got What U Need" - Diana Ross, "Love Hangover"
- "This Is Your Night" - George Benson, "Give Me The Night", Kool & The Gang, "Ladies Night"
- "Mr. Big Stuff" - Jean Knight, "Mr. Big Stuff"
