= M.O.P. discography =

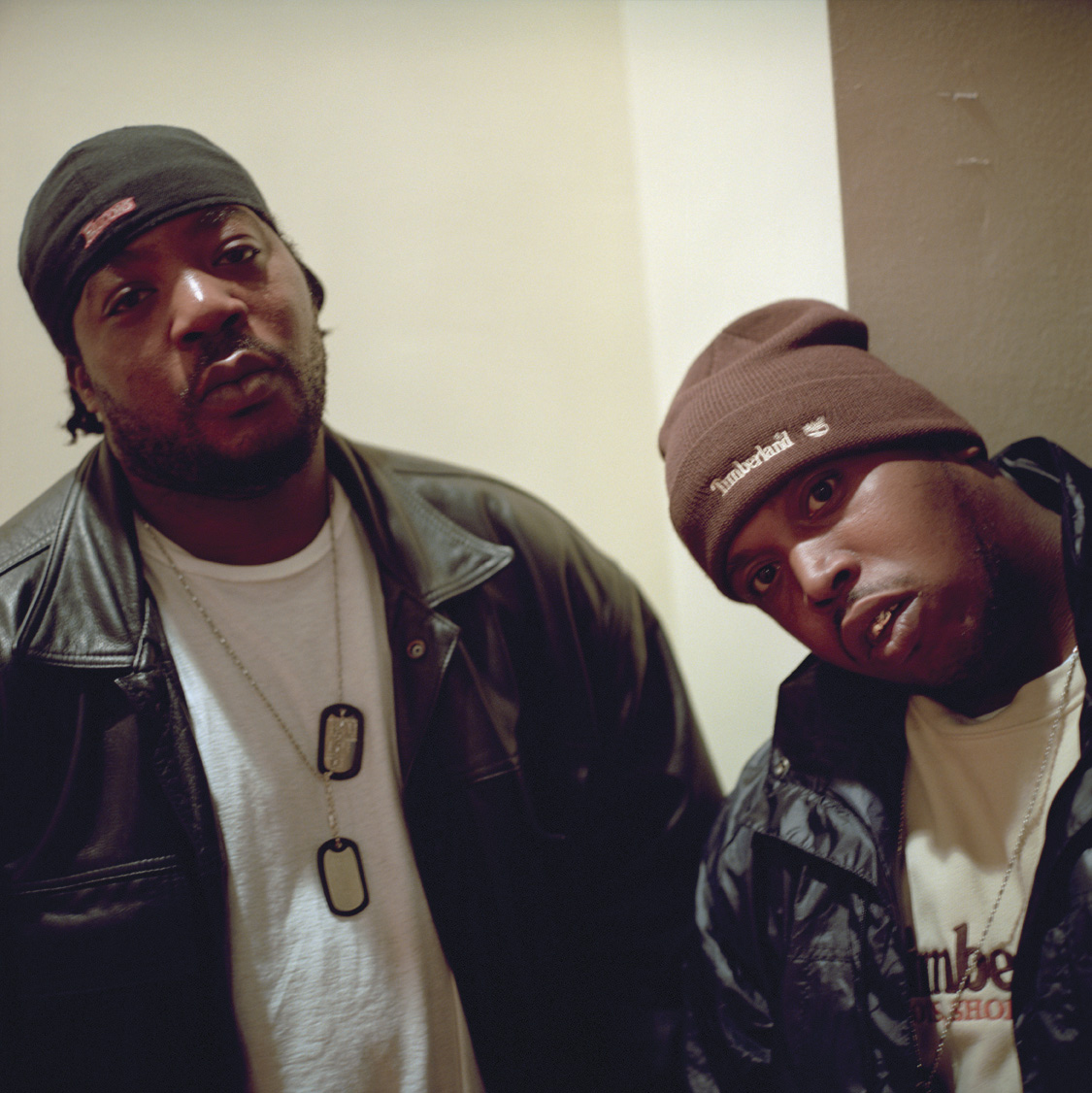
- M.O.P. in Hamburg, 2001
- Studio albums: 6
- Compilation albums: 3
- Singles: 27
- Mixtapes: 1

American hip hop duo M.O.P. have released six studio albums, three compilation albums, one mixtape, and twenty-seven singles (including eight as a featured artist).

== Albums ==
=== Studio albums ===
List of studio albums, with selected chart positions and certifications
Title	Album details	Peak chart positions									Certifications
Title	Album details	US	US Ind.	US R&B	US Rap	AUT	GER	IRL	SWI	UK	Certifications
To the Death	Released: April 7, 1994; Label: Select; Format: CD, LP, cassette, digital download	—	—	68	—	—	—	—	—	—	
Firing Squad	Released: October 22, 1996; Label: Relativity; Format: CD, LP, cassette, digital download	94	—	12	—	—	—	—	—	—	
First Family 4 Life	Released: August 11, 1998; Label: Relativity; Format: CD, LP, cassette, digital download	80	—	14	—	—	—	—	—	—	
Warriorz	Released: October 10, 2000; Label: Loud; Format: CD, LP, cassette, digital download	25	10	5	—	48	17	52	57	40	BPI: Silver
Foundation	Released: September 15, 2009; Label: E1 Music; Format: CD, digital download	—	38	44	20	—	—	—	—	—	
Street Certified	Released: November 18, 2014; Label: Nature Sounds; Format: CD, LP, digital download	—	—	—	—	—	—	—	—	—	
"—" denotes a recording that did not chart or was not released in that territory.

=== Collaborative albums ===
List of collaborative albums, with selected chart positions
Title	Album details	Peak chart positions
Title	Album details	US R&B
Sparta (with Snowgoons)	Released: November 22, 2011; Label: Babygrande; Format: CD, LP, digital download	67

=== Compilation albums ===
List of compilation albums, with selected chart positions
Title	Album details	Peak chart positions
Title	Album details	US R&B
10 Years and Gunnin'	Released: April 1, 2003; Label: Columbia; Format: CD, LP, digital download	67
Mash Out Posse	Released: May 25, 2004; Label: Fast Life; Format: CD, digital download	99
Ghetto Warfare	Released: July 25, 2006; Label: Full Clip Media; Format: CD, digital download	—
"—" denotes a recording that did not chart or was not released in that territory.

== Mixtapes ==
List of mixtapes, with selected chart positions
Title	Mixtape details	Peak chart positions	
Title	Mixtape details	US Ind.	US R&B
St. Marxmen	Released: October 18, 2005; Label: Koch; Format: CD, digital download	36	62

== Singles ==
=== As lead artist ===
List of singles as lead artist, with selected chart positions and certifications, showing year released and album name
Title	Year	Peak chart positions										Certifications	Album
Title	Year	US Bub.	US R&B	US Rap	AUT	BEL (FL) Tip.	GER	IRL	NLD	SWI	UK	Certifications	Album
"How About Some Hardcore"	1993	—	— (Note: "How About Some Hardcore" did not enter the Hot R&B/Hip-Hop Songs chart, but peaked at number seven on the Bubbling Under R&B/Hip-Hop Singles chart.)	36	—	—	—	—	—	—	—		To the Death
"Rugged Neva Smoove"	1994	—	— (Note: "Rugged Neva Smoove" did not enter the Hot R&B/Hip-Hop Songs chart, but peaked at number twenty-one on the Bubbling Under R&B/Hip-Hop Singles chart.)	—	—	—	—	—	—	—	—		To the Death
"Dead & Gone"	1996	—	87	18	—	—	—	—	—	—	—		Firing Squad
"World Famous"	1997	—	93	37	—	—	—	—	—	—	—		Firing Squad
"Handle UR Bizness"	1998	5	61	18	—	—	—	—	—	—	—		First Family 4 Life
"4 Alarm Blaze" (featuring Teflon and Jay-Z)	1998	—	—	—	—	—	—	—	—	—	—		First Family 4 Life
"G Building"	2000	—	—	38	—	—	—	—	—	—	—		Warriorz
"Ante Up"	2000	—	74	19	—	—	—	—	—	—	—		Warriorz
"Cold as Ice"	2001	—	—	—	30 (Note: "Ante Up" (Remix) and "Cold as Ice" charted as a double A-side single in certain territories.)	2	21	17	33	15	4	BPI: Silver	Warriorz
"Ante Up" (Remix) (featuring Busta Rhymes, Remy Ma and Teflon)	2001	—	—	—	30	2	21	26	33	15	7	BPI: Gold	The Mix Tape, Vol. IV
"Pounds Up"	2001	—	—	29	—	—	—	—	—	—	—		Non-album single
"Ground Zero"	2004	—	—	—	—	—	—	—	—	—	—		Mash Out Posse
"Blow the Horns"	2009	—	—	—	—	—	—	—	—	—	—		Foundation
"Bang Time" (featuring Styles P)	2009	—	—	—	—	—	—	—	—	—	—		Foundation
"Street Life" (featuring Demarco)	2009	—	—	—	—	—	—	—	—	—	—		Foundation
"Get Yours" (with Snowgoons)	2011	—	—	—	—	—	—	—	—	—	—		Sparta
"Street Certified" (featuring Mobb Deep)	2014	—	—	—	—	—	—	—	—	—	—		Street Certified
"187"	2014	—	—	—	—	—	—	—	—	—	—		Street Certified
"Broad Daylight" (featuring Busta Rhymes)	2014	—	—	—	—	—	—	—	—	—	—		Street Certified
"—" denotes a recording that did not chart or was not released in that territory.

=== As featured artist ===
List of singles as featured artist, with selected chart positions, showing year released and album name
Title	Year	Peak chart positions			Album
Title	Year	US R&B	US Rap	UK	Album
"My Kinda Nigga" (Heather B. featuring M.O.P.)	1996	— (Note: "My Kinda Nigga" did not enter the Hot R&B/Hip-Hop Songs chart, but peaked at number four on the Bubbling Under R&B/Hip-Hop Singles chart.)	32	—	Takin' Mine
"1/2 & 1/2" (Gang Starr featuring M.O.P.)	1998	—	—	—	Blade (soundtrack)
"Bucktown" (Remix) (Cocoa Brovaz featuring M.O.P.)	1998	— (Note: "Bucktown" (Remix) did not enter the Hot R&B/Hip-Hop Songs chart, but peaked at number four on the Bubbling Under R&B/Hip-Hop Singles chart.)	41	—	Non-album single
"Torture" (Screwball featuring M.O.P.)	2001	78	2	—	Loyalty
"Stand Clear" (Adam F featuring M.O.P.)	2001	—	—	43	Kaos: The Anti-Acoustic Warfare
"Life Is Good" (LFO featuring M.O.P.)	2002	—	—	—	Dr. Dolittle 2 (soundtrack) and Life Is Good
"Let It Go" (Cormega featuring M.O.P.)	2004	—	—	—	Legal Hustle
"I'll Whip Ya Head Boy" (50 Cent featuring Young Buck and M.O.P.)	2006	74	—	—	Get Rich or Die Tryin' (soundtrack)
"—" denotes a recording that did not chart or was not released in that territory.

== Guest appearances ==
List of non-single guest appearances, with other performing artists, showing year released and album name
Title	Year	Other artist(s)	Album
"4 My Peeps"	1995	Red Hot Lover Tone, Organized Konfusion, The Notorious B.I.G.	#1 Player
"Life"	1995	Guru, Sticken Muv	Illkid Records
"It's the Ones"	1996	PMD	Business Is Business
"One in tha Chamber"	1996	The Almighty RSO, Cocoa Brovaz	Doomsday: Forever RSO
"Focus"	1997	Frankie Cutlass, Lost Boyz	Politics & Bullshit
"Know da Game"	1997	Frankie Cutlass, Mobb Deep, Kool G Rap	Politics & Bullshit
"Rawness"	1997	Teflon	My Will
"Nigga Whut"	1997	Teflon	My Will
"My Planet"	1997	Teflon	My Will
"Ride"	1997	—N/a	Soul in the Hole (soundtrack)
"No Doubt"	1998	Das EFX, Teflon	Generation EFX
"B.I. vs. Friendship"	1998	Gang Starr	Moment of Truth
"My Nigga Hill FIgga"	1998	—N/a	Streets Is Watching (soundtrack) / First Family 4 Life
"No Love"	1998	DJ Clue?	The Professional
"Annihilation"	1999	Black Moon, Teflon	War Zone
"Symphony"	1999	EPMD	Out of Business
"No Mercy"	1999	Pharoahe Monch	Internal Affairs
"New York Giants"	2000	Big Pun	Yeeeah Baby
"Warfare"	2000	Afu-Ra	Body of the Life Force
"Legendary Street Team"	2000	Kool G Rap	Lyricist Lounge 2
"Run Em Over"	2000	Project Playaz	Till We Die
"Ready for War"	2000	Busta Rhymes	Anarchy
"The Mastas"	2000	Freddie Foxxx	Industry Shakedown
"Men of Business"	2001	Cuban Link, N.O.R.E., Lord Tariq, Kool G Rap	24K
"Gun Hold"	2001	DJ Honda	h III
"No Holds Barred"	2001	Guesswhyld, Tommy Lee, Royal Flush	Past, Present & Future
"Heads Off (My Niggas)"	2001	Lil Jon & the East Side Boyz	Put Yo Hood Up
"W.O.L.V.E.S."	2001	Krumbsnatcha	Training Day (soundtrack)
"Fight Club"	2001	Fat Joe, Petey Pablo	Jealous Ones Still Envy (J.O.S.E.)
"Keepin' It Gangsta" (Remix)	2001	Fabolous, Jadakiss, Styles P, Paul Cain	—N/a
"Pledge Allegiance"	2002	Jaz-O, The Immobilarie	Kingz Kounty
"Let It Bang"	2002	The X-Ecutioners	Built from Scratch
"Extended Family"	2002	Journalist	Scribes of Life
"Crossfire"	2002	Afu-Ra	Life Force Radio
"Bad Boy for Life" (Remix)	2002	P. Diddy, Busta Rhymes	We Invented the Remix
"Figadoh" (Remix)	2002	Benzino, Busta Rhymes	The Benzino Remix Project
"Masquerade"	2002	Wyclef Jean, Bumpy Knuckles, Miri Ben-Ari	Masquerade
"Y'all Don't Wanna Fuck"	2002	Styles P	A Gangster and a Gentleman
"BK to LA"	2002	Xzibit	Man vs. Machine
"City"	2002	Lil' Red	Paid In Full (soundtrack)/Dream Team
"U Don't Know" (Remix)	2002	Jay-Z	The Blueprint 2: The Gift & The Curse
"Call the Ambulance" (Remix)	2003	Busta Rhymes, Rah Digga	I Know What You Want (UK CD maxi-single)
"World Premier"	2003	Da Brat, Jermaine Dupri, Q Da Kid	Limelite, Luv & Niteclubz
"Stompdashitoutu"	2003	C.N.N.	Cradle 2 the Grave (soundtrack)
"Who Got Gunz"	2003	Gang Starr, Fat Joe	The Ownerz
"The Hussle"	2003	Mr. Cheeks	Back Again!
"Wanna Be G's"	2003	Sharintha Lee	Bad Boys II (soundtrack)
"It's That Simple"	2003	Victoria Beckham	—N/a
"On the Run"	2003	Mark Ronson, Mos Def	Here Comes the Fuzz
"Hood Muzik"	2003	Memphis Bleek	M.A.D.E.
"Stomp The Shit Out You" (Madlib Remix)	2004	Madlib	Mind Fusion Vol. 1
"Stop the Show"	2004	The Alchemist, Stat Quo	1st Infantry
"When Death Becomes You"	2005	50 Cent	Get Rich or Die Tryin' soundtrack
"300 Shots"	2005	G-Unit, Mase, Mobb Deep	G-Unit Radio Part 15: Are You a Window Shopper?
"First, Last and Only"	2005	Memphis Bleek	534
"Jealousy"	2005	Kurupt, Roscoe	Against the Grain
"Guns Go Bang"	2006	Young Buck	Chronic 2006
"Sit 'Em Back Slow"	2006	AZ	The Format
"Push Back"	2006	Killer Mike	The Killer
"Giantz of NYC"	2006	DJ Clue?	The Professional 3
"Pepsi Smash Mic Pass"	2006	Spider Loc, Freeway, Tony Yayo, Lloyd Banks, Hot Rod	—N/a
"One More Time" (1 Series Remix)	2007	Machel Montano	Book of Angels
"Let It Bang"	2007	Grandmaster Roc Raida	Beats, Cuts and Skits
"Gangsta Boy"	2008	Jake One	White Van Music
"For the City"	2008	Statik Selektah, Jadakiss	Stick 2 the Script
"Woodstock (Hood Hop)"	2009	Crooked I, Slaughterhouse	Mr. Pigface Weapon Waist
"Ill Figures"	2009	Raekwon, Kool G Rap	Wu-Tang Chamber Music
"Magnifique"	2009	Poison Pen	The Money Shot
"Don't Fucc Around"	2009	Tommy Tee	Studio Time
"Bang Time"	2010	Styles P, DJ Green Lantern	The Green Ghost Project
"Let's Ryde Together"	2010	DJ Kay Slay, Trick-Trick, Trae tha Truth, Tre Williams	More Than Just a DJ
"Thugathon 2010"	2010	Static Selektah, Termanology	1982
"International"	2011	Soulkast, Brahi	Honoris Causa
"Legendary Weapons"	2011	Ghostface Killah, AZ	Legendary Weapons
"Plocka Han"	2011	Ken Ring, Tommy Tee	—N/a
"Full Contact Fighter"	2012	D-One	—N/a
"Crazy"	2012	Termanology, Lil' Fame	Fizzyology
"Black Out"	2012	Ghostface Killah, Pharoahe Monch	The Man with the Iron Fists (soundtrack)
"HyperParadise" (Flume's Mixtape Version)	2012	Flume	Flume (Deluxe Edition Bonus Disc)
"The Hardest"	2013	P-Money	Gratitude
"You Know You Love This"	2013	Tony Touch	The Piece Maker 3: Return of the 50 MC's
"I Don't Give a Fuck 2.0"	2013	Peter Jackson, Troy Ave, Talib Kweli, Skyzoo, Joell Ortiz	Good Company
"Another Time"	2015	DJ EFN, Guilty Simpson, Inspectah Deck	Another Time
"Detonate"	2015	Apollo Brown	Grandeur
"Stomp Rappers"	2018	Apathy, Celph Titled, Chumzilla	The Widow's Son
"Duckits"	2018	Brothers of the Stone	Return to Stoney Island
"Dusk TIl Dawn"	2018	Connie Price and the Keystones, Black Shakespeare	Lucas High
"S.T.F.U."	2019	Sticky Fingaz, Fredro Starr, Vado	It's About T.I.M.E.
"What Happened to the Streets?"	2019	Benny the Butcher	—N/a
"Never Give Up"	2019	DJ Tomekk	—N/a
"Lights Out"	2019	Gang Starr	One of the Best Yet
"The Slayers' Club"	2020	R.A. the Rugged Man	All My Heroes Are Dead
"Czar"	2020	Busta Rhymes	Extinction Level Event 2: The Wrath of God
"Zoned Out"	2021	Terminology, Amadeus, Lil Fame	360
"Killpoint"	2022	Vinnie Paz	Tortured in the Name of God's Unconditional Love
"The Thoro Side"	2023	Teflon, DJ Premier	2 Sides to Every Story
"It's Different"	2023	Statik Selektah	Round Trip
"WAR"	2024	Joell Ortiz, The Heatmakerz	W.A.R.
"Sample 420"	2025	Ghostface Killah	Supreme Clientele

== Music videos ==
List of music videos, with directors, showing year released
Title	Year	Director(s)
"How About Some Hardcore?"	1994	
"Rugged Neva Smooth"	1994	
"Dead & Gone"	1996	
"Wanna Be Niggas" (Heather B feat. M.O.P.)	1996	
"World Famous"	1996	
"One in the Chamba" (Almighty RSO feat. M.O.P.)	1996	
"Handle UR Bizness"	1998	
"4 Alarm Blaze"	1998	
"Legendary Team" (with Kool G Rap)	2000	
"Ante Up"	2000	
"Cold as Ice"	2000	
"Ante Up" (Remix) (featuring Busta Rhymes, Remy Ma and Teflon)	2001	Chris Robinson, Jessy Terrero
"Let It Go" (Cormega feat. M.O.P.)	2004	
"Czar" (Busta Rhymes feat. M.O.P.)	2020	
