= 10 Years and Gunnin' =

Greatest hits album by M.O.P.
- Released: April 1, 2003
- Studio: Pyramid Sound Recording Studios (Ithaca, NY); D&D Studios (New York, NY)
- Genre: East Coast hip-hop; hardcore hip-hop
- Length: 41:36
- Label: Columbia
- Producer: Big Jaz; DJ Premier; DR Period; Laze E Laze; M.O.P.

M.O.P. chronology
Warriorz (2000)	10 Years and Gunnin' (2003)	Mash Out Posse (2004)

Professional ratings
Review scores
Source	Rating
AllMusic	4/5 stars
RapReviews	9/10
Spin	A−

10 Years and Gunnin' is the first greatest hits album by American hardcore hip-hop duo M.O.P. It was released on April 1, 2003 via Columbia Records. The album title is a reference to N.W.A's 1990 extended play 100 Miles and Runnin'.

Produced by DR Period, Jaz-O, Laze E Laze, DJ Premier and M.O.P. themselves, it features guest appearances from Teflon, Busta Rhymes, Jay-Z and Remy Ma. In the United States, the compilation peaked at number 67 on the Top R&B/Hip-Hop Albums charts.

== Track listing ==
No.	Title	Writer(s)	Producer(s)	Length
1.	"How About Some Hardcore"	Jamal Grinnage; Eric Murray; Darryl Pittman	DR Period	4:33
2.	"Handle Ur Bizness"	Grinnage; Murray	Laze E Laze	4:17
3.	"Fly Nigga Hill Figga"	Grinnage; Murray	M.O.P.	4:07
4.	"4 Alarm Blaze" (featuring Teflon and Jay-Z)	Grinnage; Murray; Linwood Starling; Shawn Carter; Lawrence Elliott; Frank Sullivan III; James Michael Peterik	Laze E Laze	4:29
5.	"Ante Up (Robbin Hoodz Theory)"	Grinnage; Murray; Pittman	DR Period	4:09
6.	"World Famous"	Grinnage; Murray; Jonathan Burks; Charles Mann; Donny Hathaway; Roberta Flack	Jaz-O	4:11
7.	"Downtown Swinga ('96)"	Grinnage; Murray; Chris Martin	DJ Premier	3:40
8.	"Cold as Ice"	Grinnage; Murray; Louis Andrew Grammatico; Michael Leslie Jones	Fizzy Womack	4:04
9.	"Born 2 Kill"	Grinnage; Murray; Burks	Jaz-O	4:33
10.	"Ante Up Remix" (featuring Busta Rhymes, Teflon and Remy Martin)	Grinnage; Murray; Trevor Smith; Starling; Pittman	DR Period	3:33
Total length:				41:36

Notes

- Track 1 is taken from To the Death album (1994)
- track 2 is taken from "Handle Ur Bizness" single (1998)
- Tracks 3 and 4 are taken from First Family 4 Life album (1998)
- Tracks 5 and 8 are taken from Warriorz album (2000)
- Tracks 6, 7 and 9 are taken from Firing Squad album (1996)
- Track 10 is taken from 60 Minutes of Funk, Volume IV: The Mixtape (2000)

== Charts ==
Chart (2003)	Peak position
US Top R&B/Hip-Hop Albums (Billboard)	67
