= Handle Ur Bizness EP =

Handle Ur Bizness

EP by M.O.P.
- Released: January 1998
- Recorded: 1997
- Genre: Hip hop
- Length: 31:36
- Label: Priority Records
- Producer: Laze E Laze; M.O.P.

M.O.P. chronology
Firing Squad (1996)	Handle Ur Bizness (1998)	First Family 4 Life (1998)

Professional ratings
Review scores
Source	Rating
The Source	3.5/5 stars

Handle Ur Bizness is an EP released by Brooklyn-based hip-hop duo M.O.P. in 1997. It is an 8-track EP featuring exclusive material from M.O.P. as a teaser for its upcoming album First Family 4 Life released the same year. The EP features five original songs, two skits plus a remix of the title track which later also appeared on the album. The EP is now out of print.

== Track listing ==
#	Title	Producer(s)	Time
1	"NBCFWM"	Laze E Laze	5:46
2	"Soundman"	Laze E Laze	1:14
3	"Handle Ur Bizness"	Laze E Laze	4:21
4	"Way Of The World"	Laze E Laze	4:04
5	"Shady Grady's Bar And Grill"	Laze E Laze	2:00
6	"Move Something"	M.O.P.	4:24
7	"Cold World"	Laze E Laze	4:51
8	"Handle Ur Bizness (Remix)"	DJ Premier	4:15
