= Ghetto Warfare =

Compilation album by M.O.P.
- Released: July 25, 2006
- Genre: East Coast hip-hop; hardcore hip-hop
- Length: 66:56
- Label: Full Clip Media

M.O.P. chronology
Warriorz (2000)	Ghetto Warfare (2006)	Foundation (2009)

Ghetto Warfare is a compilation album by the rap duo M.O.P. It was released on July 25, 2006 but had been recorded several years before (between 2001–2003) while the group was signed to Roc-A-Fella. The album was shelved and released later by Coppertop Records, a small indie label.

== Track listing ==
1. "Intro" – 0:58
2. "Welcome Back" (featuring Teflon) – 1:28
3. "Roc La Familia" (featuring Jay-Z, Memphis Bleek & State Property) – 3:46
4. "Instigator" (featuring Teflon) – 3:54^{*} (Produced by 9th Wonder)
5. "Interlude" – 1:11
6. "Fuck M.O.P." – 3:24^{***}
7. "Stompdashitoutu" (featuring Capone-N-Noreaga) – 3:01^{**} (Produced by Tony Pizarro)
8. "Interlude" – 2:14
9. "Fire" – 4:48 (Produced by DR Period)
10. "Got to Go" – 3:47^{***}
11. "The Bottom" – 5:07
12. "Put It in the Air" (featuring Jay-Z) – 4:05^{****} (Produced by Fizzy Womack, Laze E Laze)
13. "What the Fuck" – 4:18^{***}
14. "Wanna Be Gs" – 4:38^{*****} (Produced by M.O.P.)
15. "Live from Ground Zero" – 4:19 (Produced by Ill Will Fulton)
16. "Take a Minute" – 3:00^{****} (Produced by Kouch)
17. "Muddy Waters" – 4:14^{****} (Produced by Tommy Tee)
18. "G-Boy Stance" – 4:15^{***} (Produced by DR Period)
19. "BKNY" – 4:29^{*} (Produced by Heatmakerz)

^{*} previously released on Code of the Streets
^{**} previously released on Cradle 2 the Grave soundtrack
^{***} previously released on Marxmen Cinema
^{****} previously released on St. Marxmen
^{*****} previously released on Bad Boys II soundtrack
