= Noah Rubin (music executive) =

American music executive

- Origin: United States
- Genres: Hip hop, hardcore punk, indie rock
- Occupations: Music executive, music producer, editor, author
- Instruments: Guitar/Bass, Sampler, Keyboard, Vocals
- Years active: 2006–present
- Labels: Mass Appeal, Decon, Din Mak, E1 Entertainment, 4AD, IAMSOUND
- Website: www.noahrubin.com

Noah Rubin is an American-born artist/producer, music executive, media executive and author. He is the former editor-in-chief of both Merry Jane and Mass Appeal (media) and the author of How We Roll: The Art and Culture of Joints, Blunts, and Spliffs.

== Music ==
Alongside Chris Coady, Rubin recorded Das Oath's 2006 Mini-LP for Dim Mak Records. The album garnered favorable reviews including Vice Magazine's album of the month in August of that year.

In 2007 and 2008 Rubin produced several remixes under the moniker Ruby Beats for indie rock acts like Celebration, Architecture in Helsinki, and Rings. He also sang backing vocals on Celebration's 4AD Records release The Modern Tribe alongside members of TV On The Radio, Antibalas and Dragons of Zynth. Rubin's vocals appear as well on Suckers 2009 debut EP on IAMSOUND Records, produced by Yeasayer's Anand Wilder.

In 2009 Rubin produced, mixed, and engineered the majority of tracks on the album Wu Tang Chamber Music released by E1 Entertainment and Universal Records. Chamber Music paired Wu Tang MCs like Raekwon, Ghostface, RZA, and Inspectah Deck with Kool G Rap, Sadat X, Cormega, AZ, Masta Ace and M.O.P. Rubin's voice is heard on the final track of the album.

Later in the year, Rubin engineered and mixed tracks on the Historics debut record Strategies for Apprehension. Historics features Maroon 5 bassist Mickey Madden, VietNam guitarist Josh Grubb, Icarus Line/Ink & Dagger/ Amazing Baby’s Don Devore on guitar/vocals, keyboard player Dale Jiminez from Need New Body, and drummer Ryan Rapsys from Euphone and The Sea and Cake. The album features a guest appearance by Kool Keith.

In 2010 Rubin produced the track "Georgia" on the Bubba Sparxxx record Miracle on Gamble Road released on E1/New South. Rubin also produced a remix of the Suckers track "Before Your Birthday Ends" that premiered on RCRD LBL late in the year.

Early in 2011 RCRD LBL debuted Rubin's remix of The Entrance Band's "Still Be There."

In July 2011, Rubin produced, recorded and mixed Legendary Weapons by Wu-Tang Clan, which was released July 26, 2011 on E1 Music. It follows 2009's Wu-Tang Chamber Music. Legendary Weapons features performances by Wu-Tang members (GZA and Masta Killa are absent), and affiliates Trife Diesel, Killa Sin and Bronze Nazareth. Other guests include Sean Price, M.O.P., AZ, Action Bronson & Roc Marciano among others.

In late 2011, Rubin began serving as VP of Music at Decon (now Mass Appeal Records) where he oversaw releases by artists such as Pusha T, The Hood Internet, Roc Marciano, Gangrene, Alexander Spit, The Alchemist, Pimp C and more.

Rubin has also been noted for his work mixing Waterfall, the debut EP from Kanye West Yeezus contributor, Evian Christ, as well as Suicideyear's debut record Remembrance.

== Media ==
In 2014, Rubin became editor-in-chief of Mass Appeal (media) where he oversaw covers including Kendrick Lamar, Tyler, the Creator, and Eric Andre.

In 2016, Rubin became editor-in-chief of Snoop Dogg's media platform Merry Jane. He also began hosting a twice-weekly podcast called About That Time.

== How We Roll ==
In 2022, Rubin announced his first book, How We Roll: The Art and Culture of Joints, Blunts, and Spliffs to be published by Chronicle Books. The book features notable personalities including Wiz Khalifa, Wayne Coyne, Tommy Chong, Dawn Richard, and Laganja Estranja.
