= Mash Out Posse (album) =

Compilation album by M.O.P.
- Released: May 25, 2004
- Recorded: Fall 2003–early 2004 ***Studios New York, Texas
- Genres: Rap rock; rap metal
- Length: 50:10
- Labels: Fast Life Music, Inc.

M.O.P. chronology
10 Years and Gunnin' (2003)	Mash Out Posse (2004)	St. Marxmen (2005)

Professional ratings
Review scores
Source	Rating
AllMusic	1.5/5 stars
HipHopDX	3.5/5 stars
RapReviews	7.5/10

Mash Out Posse is M.O.P.'s self-titled compilation album. This album is a rock-rap album which contains rock remixes of M.O.P.'s songs off other albums and some original songs. M.O.P. collaborated with the rock band Shiner Massive.

== Track listing ==
1. "Conquerors" (2:40)
2. "Ground Zero" (4:09)
3. "Put It in the Air" (3:21)
4. "Calm Down" (3:01)
5. "Stand Clear" (3:46)
6. "Fire" (4:59)
7. "Hilltop Flava (No Sleep 'Til Brooklyn)" (3:44)
8. "Stand Up" (4:55)
9. "Stress Y'All" (3:34)
10. "Raise Hell" (3:18)
11. "It's That Simple" (3:59)
12. "Get the Fuck Outta Here" (5:19)
13. "Ante Up/Robbin' Hoodz" (3:23)

== Samples ==
1. "Raise Hell" contains a sample of Angel of Death by Slayer

== Charts ==
Chart (2004)	Peak position
US Top R&B/Hip-Hop Albums (Billboard)	99
