= Merry Jane =

Cannabis-focused website

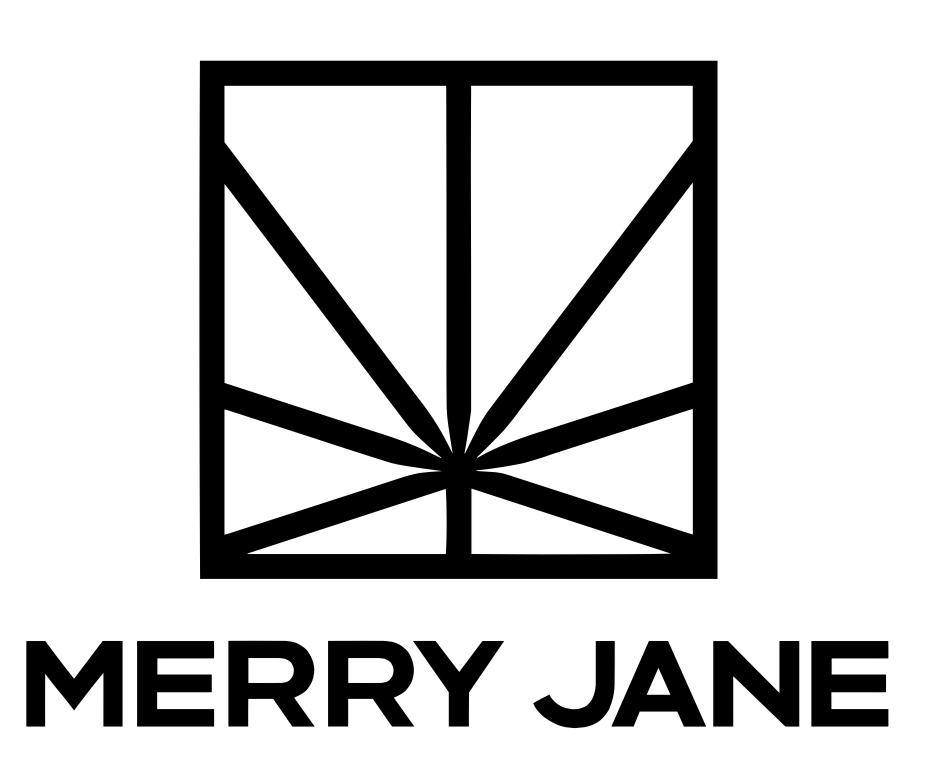
- Website type: News and opinion
- Available in: English
- Founders: Ted Chung (CEO); Snoop Dogg
- Website: merryjane.com
- Commercial: Yes
- Launched: September 21, 2015
- Current status: Active

Merry Jane (stylized MERRY JANE) is a cannabis-focused digital media platform launched by rapper Snoop Dogg in 2015, with media entrepreneur Ted Chung. The site features editorial content on the business and politics of the cannabis industry, original video series as well as a database for identifying cannabis strains and dispensaries.

== History ==
Merry Jane is backed by Snoop Dogg's own capital venture firm Casa Verde Capital which has a history of investing in marijuana-based enterprise such as medical marijuana delivery service Eaze. Prior to launch, Snoop and co-founder Ted Chung curated marijuana dispensaries to appear on the platform, which now functions as a searchable database. Merry Jane launched on September 21, 2015 in invite-only beta, but is now a public platform.

=== Launch ===
Snoop Dogg launched Merry Jane at TechCrunch's 2015 Disrupt Conference held in San Francisco, alongside co-founder Ted Chung. Snoop was quoted as saying, "After watching where the cannabis industry is headed, I wanted to create a platform that will take this movement further." He also suggested that Merry Jane was there to normalize the conversation around marijuana: “There are so many people in the closet. We are giving them an opportunity to come out of the closet and just admit they like to smoke."

=== Headlines ===
In January 2018, to celebrate the passage of Proposition 64, Merry Jane teamed up with Jack in the Box to promote the "Merry Munchie Meal" which included multiple fast food items for $4.20, a symbolic number in the marijuana community.

== Activism ==
Merry Jane and its founders take an active stance on the legalization of marijuana in the United States.

=== Snoop Dogg at the DNC ===
Prior to founding Merry Jane, Snoop Dogg was active in Colorado in the legal era, getting involved with the 2014 gubernatorial campaign. He also recorded a video message for the Centennial State ahead of the one-day pot tax holiday.

In the summer of 2016, Merry Jane sponsored The High Road Tour; a 33 date tour throughout the United States and Canada headlined by Snoop Dogg & Wiz Khalifa, with support from Kevin Gates, Jhené Aiko, Casey Veggies and DJ Drama. As part of the tour, Snoop closed the 2016 Democratic National Convention following Hillary Clinton’s closing speech.

=== Merry Jane Wellness Retreat ===
Alongside Revolt, Merry Jane hosts an annual weed wellness retreat in Colorado, one of the most accepting marijuana states in the United States. The hip-hop music festival occurs around 4/20 in multiple cities and aims to celebrate the legalization of cannabis and raise awareness of its potential benefits. The 2018 420 Wellness Retreat Tour was promoted four concerts across two days, Denver and Las Vegas on 4/20 and then Seattle and Eugene on 4/21.

== Video content ==
Merry Jane is responsible for producing a number of video properties for television and other networks, as well as for its own platform.

=== GGN ===
Merry Jane produces Snoop Dogg's Double G News Network, an online talk show hosted by the rapper which was launched in 2011. GGN has hosted several high-profile celebrity guests including Khloe Kardashian, Larry King, Jimmy Kimmel, 50 Cent, Tony Hawk and DJ Khaled.

=== Martha & Snoop's Dinner Party ===
Merry Jane executive produced Martha & Snoop's Dinner Party for VH1, an unscripted cooking series with Martha Stewart and Snoop Dogg as well as celebrity guests. Stewart said in a statement: "Martha & Snoop's Dinner Party will redesign the traditional food competition shows in a new, different and very funny way." The 10-episode weekly series is set to debut in the fall.

=== Mary + Jane ===
Merry Jane executive produced the MTV comedy series "Mary + Jane" which follows the lives of two women trying to get their weed delivery service up-and-running. The theme song is provided by Snoop Dogg who also stars in the first season.

=== Planet Snoop ===
Planet Snoop is an online nature documentary spoof narrated by Snoop Dogg that is produced and hosted by Merry Jane. The series was inspired by a handful of segments Snoop filmed for Jimmy Kimmel Live called, "Plizzanet Earth," in which he reacted to clips from the hit BBC nature documentary Planet Earth. The videos were so popular, a petition to have Snoop narrate an entire season of the show garnered 75,000 signatures, leading to the creation of Planet Snoop.

=== Rolling with Rogen ===
Actor Seth Rogen is a content partner of Merry Jane and has his own series in which he explains the basics of smoking weed and offers advice on getting stoned.

=== Deflowered ===
Deflowered is a series of interviews which explores users' first experiences with marijuana. The series has featured celebrities such as Rick Ross, MixedByAli and gained particular notoriety for an interview with former NFL lineman Eben Britton who used the platform to challenge the stigma the drug faces within the NFL. “The health risks linked to pharmaceutical drugs are well documented and players should have the option to choose a natural alternative for pain management,” he said. “It’s time to consider cannabis a legitimate medicine and remove the negative stigma.”

=== About That Time ===
About That Time was a livestream talk show hosted by Merry Jane Creative Director Noah Rubin. The show's format covered the latest in cannabis news, visually-driven social media stories, and an astrology segment. The show was shared through Snoop Dogg's platforms as well as on Merry Jane's Instagram and Facebook Live. Notable guests include Cheech Marin, Peter Dante, Dawn Richard, YFN Lucci, Savage Realm, Andrew WK, Lil Debbie and more.

=== Others ===
- Fresh Out the Box
- Fork With Me
- Highly Productive
- Smoke in the Kitchen
- Wide World of Cannabis

== See also ==
- Mary + Jane
- Seth Rogen
- Snoop Dogg
