= Legendary Weapons =

Compilation album by Wu-Tang
- Released: July 26, 2011
- Recorded: 2010–2011
- Genre: Hip-hop
- Length: 37:05
- Label: E1 Music
- Producer: The RZA (exec.); Andrew Kelley; Gintas Janusonis; J. Werner; Lil' Fame; Noah Rubin; Street Radio

Wu-Tang chronology
Wu-Tang Chamber Music (2009)	Legendary Weapons (2011)	The Essential Wu-Tang Clan (2013)

Professional ratings
Aggregate scores
Source	Rating
Metacritic	(61/100)
Review scores
Source	Rating
Allmusic	3/5 stars
BBC Music	(favorable)
Drowned in Sound	(7/10)
The Guardian	3/5 stars
Pitchfork Media	(5.0/10)
RapReviews.com	(8.5/10)
Slant	2.5/5 stars
Spin	(5/10)
XXL	(L)

Legendary Weapons is a compilation album endorsed by Wu-Tang Clan, released on July 26, 2011 via E1 Music. This album serves as the group's second release under the abbreviated name "Wu-Tang," following Chamber Music, released in 2009. Legendary Weapons features performances by several Wu-Tang members (GZA and Masta Killa are absent), and affiliates Trife Diesel, Killa Sin and Bronze Nazareth. Other guests include Sean Price, M.O.P., AZ, Action Bronson & Roc Marciano among others.

The album debuted at number 41 on the US Billboard 200 chart, with first-week sales of 10,000 copies in the United States. As of November 27, 2011, the album has sold a total of 25,000 copies in the United States. In Canada, the album debuted at #98 on the Canadian Albums Chart.

== Track listing ==
No.	Title	Producer(s)	Length
1.	"Start the Show" (Raekwon and RZA featuring Jimi Kendrix)	Street Radio	3:45
2.	"Laced Cheeba" (Ghostface Killah featuring Sean Price and Trife Da God)	Noah Rubin; Lil' Fame; Andrew Kelley	3:27
3.	"Diesel Fluid" (Method Man and Cappadonna featuring Trife Da God)	Noah Rubin; Lil' Fame; Andrew Kelley	4:07
4.	"The Black Diamonds" (Ghostface Killah featuring Roc Marciano and Killa Sin)	Lil' Fame; Andrew Kelley; Noah Rubin; J. Werner	3:19
5.	"Played by the Game" (interlude)	Andrew Kelley; Noah Rubin	1:02
6.	"Legendary Weapons" (Ghostface Killah featuring AZ and M.O.P.)	Noah Rubin; Lil' Fame; Andrew Kelley	3:22
7.	"Never Feel This Pain" (Inspectah Deck and U-God featuring Tre Williams)	Lil' Fame; Andrew Kelley; Noah Rubin	3:59
8.	"Drunk Tongue" (featuring Killa Sin)	Lil' Fame; Andrew Kelley; Noah Rubin	2:04
9.	"The Business" (interlude)	Gintas Janusonis; Andrew Kelley; Noah Rubin	0:51
10.	"225 Rounds" (U-God, Cappadonna and RZA featuring Bronze Nazareth)	Noah Rubin; Lil' Fame; Andrew Kelley	4:43
11.	"Meteor Hammer" (Ghostface Killah featuring Action Bronson & Termanology)	Noah Rubin; Lil' Fame; Andrew Kelley	2:36
12.	"Live Through Death" (interlude)	Gintas Janusonis; Andrew Kelley; Noah Rubin	0:51
13.	"Only The Rugged Survive" (RZA)	Noah Rubin	2:47
14.	"Outro"		0:16
15.	"Robbery (Revelations Remix)" (RZA featuring Rev. William Burks)		2:57

== Charts ==
=== Weekly charts ===
Weekly chart performance for Legendary Weapons
Chart (2011)	Peak position
US Billboard 200	41
Canadian Albums (Billboard)	98
