= Foundation (M.O.P. album) =

Studio album by M.O.P.
- Released: September 15, 2009
- Genres: East Coast hip-hop; hardcore hip-hop
- Label: E1 Music
- Producers: Laze E Laze (exec.); DJ Green Lantern; DJ Premier; DR Period; Fizzy Womack; Kil; M-Phazes; Nottz; Ron G; Statik Selektah; Taylor Made

M.O.P. chronology
Ghetto Warfare (2006)	Foundation (2009)	Sparta (2011)

Professional ratings
Review scores
Source	Rating
HipHopDX	4/5
RapReviews	8/10
Robert Christgau	(2-star Honorable Mention)
The Phoenix	3.5/4 stars
XXL	4/5

Foundation is the fifth studio album by the American hip-hop duo M.O.P., from Brooklyn, New York. It was released on September 15, 2009 via E1 Music. Production was handled by DR Period, Statik Selektah, DJ Green Lantern, DJ Premier, Kil, M-Phazes, Nottz, Ron G, Taylor Made, and member Lil' Fame under his Fizzy Womack alias, with Laze-E-Laze serving as executive producer. It features guest appearances from DeMarco, Redman, Rell, Styles P, Termanology and The Revelations.

After being put in limbo with Roc-A-Fella Records without releasing any new material, the duo signed to G-Unit Records where they once again ended up without any releases beside mixtapes and street albums. Signing a deal with E1/Koch Records, Lil' Fame (Fizzy Womack) and Billy Danze finally release their long-awaited full-length LP on September 15. Production on "Rude Bastards" is produced by little known producer Kil, whose contribution is credited to Fizzy Womack in the liner notes and in initial press releases.

The album was released to positive reviews from the press although it seems to have been a little rushed, as the aforementioned "Rude Bastards" got wrongly credited to Fizzy Womack, the final version of "What I Wanna B" features scratches and cuts by DJ Premier that didn't make the final cut and DJ Premier has also been quoted to say that he produced two more tracks for the album but didn't make the deadline due to M.O.P. touring to promote the album.

== Track listing ==
No.	Title	Writer(s)	Producer(s)	Length
1.	"I'm a Brownsvillian" (featuring The Revelations)	Jamal Grinnage; Eric Murray; Dominick Lamb	Nottz	3:47
2.	"Blow the Horns"	Grinnage; Murray	Fizzy Womack	3:00
3.	"What I Wanna B" (featuring Rell)	Grinnage; Murray; Chris Martin; T. Williams	DJ Premier	3:18
4.	"Foundation"	Grinnage; Murray; Curtis Small	M-Phazes	3:35
5.	"Stop Pushin'"	Grinnage; Murray	Fizzy Womack	3:04
6.	"Crazy" (featuring Termanology)	Grinnage; Murray; Daniel Carrillo; Patrick Baril	Statik Selektah	4:44
7.	"Street Life" (featuring DeMarco)	Grinnage; Murray; Collin Edwards	Fizzy Womack	3:44
8.	"Forever and Always"	Grinnage; Murray; Baril	Statik Selektah	4:01
9.	"Rude Bastard"	Grinnage; Murray	Kil	3:44
10.	"Brooklyn"	Grinnage; Murray; Ronald Bowser	Ron G; M.O.P. (co.)	5:06
11.	"Bang Time" (featuring Styles P)	Grinnage; Murray; David Styles	DJ Green Lantern	4:13
12.	"Sharks in the Water"	Grinnage; Murray; Darryl Pittman	DR Period	3:51
13.	"Riding Through" (featuring Redman)	Grinnage; Murray	Taylor Made	5:15
14.	"Salute a G"	Grinnage; Murray; Pittman	DR Period	3:29

== Personnel ==
- Jamal "Lil' Fame"/"Fizzy Womack" Grinnage – vocals, producer (tracks: 2, 5, 7)
- Eric "Billy Danze" Murray – vocals
- Gerrell "Rell" Gaddis – vocals (track 3)
- Daniel "Termanology" Carrillo – vocals (track 6)
- Collin "Demarco" Edwards – vocals (track 7)
- David "Styles P" Styles – vocals (track 11)
- Reginald "Redman" Noble – vocals (track 13)
- Dominick "Nottz" Lamb – producer (track 1)
- Christopher "DJ Premier" Martin – producer (track 3)
- Mark "M-Phazes" Landon – producer (track 4)
- Patrick "Statik Selektah" Baril – producer (tracks: 6, 8)
- Rahaman "Kil" Kilpatrick – producer (track 9)
- Ronald "Ron G" Bowser – producer (track 10)
- James "DJ Green Lantern" D'Agostino – producer (track 11)
- Darryl "DR Period" Pittman – producer (tracks: 12, 14)
- Taylor Massey – producer (track 13)
- Lawrence "Laze E Laze" Elliott – executive producer

== Charts ==
Chart (2009)	Peak position
US Top R&B/Hip-Hop Albums (Billboard)	44
US Independent Albums (Billboard)	38
