= Wu-Tang Chamber Music =

Chamber Music

Compilation album by Wu-Tang
- Released: June 30, 2009
- Recorded: 2008–2009
- Genre: East Coast hip-hop, spoken word
- Length: 35:38
- Label: E1 Music, Universal Records
- Producer: RZA (exec.), Andrew Kelley, Noah Rubin, Fizzy Womack, Josh Werner, Gintas Janusonis, The Revelations, Bob Perry

Wu-Tang chronology
Soundtracks from the Shaolin Temple (2008)	Chamber Music (2009)	Legendary Weapons (2011)

Professional ratings
Aggregate scores
Source	Rating
Metacritic	(75/100)
Review scores
Source	Rating
Allmusic	3/5 stars
HipHopDX	4.5/5 stars
HipHopSite.Com	3.5/5 stars
Pitchfork Media	(7.5/10)
RapReviews	(8/10)
The Smoking Section	3.5/5 stars

Chamber Music is a compilation album endorsed by Wu-Tang Clan, released on June 30, 2009, through E1 Music/Universal Records. This album also serves as the group's first release under the abbreviated name "Wu-Tang," a concept that would continue in subsequent compilation albums. It features performances by several Wu-Tang members (GZA, Masta Killa, Method Man and Cappadonna are absent) and affiliates. The album was released to positive reviews from music critics. This album was followed up with the 2011 compilation album Legendary Weapons.

== Compilation background ==
Although it is not actually a group album, RZA is the executive producer for the album, and it features several members of the Wu-Tang Clan collaborating with New York hip-hop veterans; AZ, Kool G Rap, M.O.P., Sadat X, Sean Price, Cormega, Masta Ace, and Havoc of Mobb Deep. The album also includes several philosophical spoken word tracks from the RZA.

The album's production features live instrumentation by Brooklyn soul band, The Revelations, directed, edited, and produced by The Revelations, Bob Perry, Andrew Kelley, Noah Rubin, M.O.P.'s Lil' Fame (also known as Fizzy Womack), Josh Werner, and Gintas Janusonis. Chamber Music has a sound inspired by classic soul and kung fu imagery that resembles the signature Wu-Tang Clan sound. In regards to this RZA mentioned:

This album has a very live element of today’s musicians playing the vibe of Wu-Tang. The vibe we would normally sample, the vibe of things that we would accumulate through old soul songs, jazz songs, kung fu movies, whatever, now you’ve got musicians that can play this vibe with Wu-Tang MCs rapping over it. The goal of this album is definitely paying homage to our early sound.

== Track listing ==
No.	Title	Producer	Length
1.	"Redemption"	The Revelations, Bob Perry, Noah Rubin	1:11
2.	"Kill Too Hard" (Inspectah Deck and U-God featuring Masta Ace)	Fizzy Womack, Gintas Janusonis	2:49
3.	"The Abbot" (RZA)	The Revelations, Bob Perry, Noah Rubin	1:15
4.	"Harbor Masters" (Ghostface Killah and Inspectah Deck featuring AZ)	Fizzy Womack, Andrew Kelley, Noah Rubin	3:52
5.	"Sheep State" (RZA)	The Revelations, Bob Perry, Noah Rubin	0:38
6.	"Radiant Jewels" (Raekwon featuring Cormega and Sean Price)	Fizzy Womack, Andrew Kelley, Noah Rubin	2:36
7.	"Supreme Architecture" (RZA)	The Revelations, Bob Perry, Noah Rubin	1:17
8.	"Evil Deeds" (Ghostface Killah and RZA featuring Havoc)	Fizzy Womack, Andrew Kelley, Noah Rubin	3:37
9.	"Wise Men" (RZA)	The Revelations, Bob Perry, Noah Rubin	0:58
10.	"I Wish You Were Here" (Ghostface Killah featuring Tre Williams)	Fizzy Womack, Bob Perry	3:40
11.	"Fatal Hesitation"	The Revelations, Bob Perry, Noah Rubin	1:29
12.	"Ill Figures" (Raekwon featuring M.O.P. & Kool G Rap)	Fizzy Womack, Josh Werner	2:53
13.	"Free Like ODB" (RZA)	The Revelations, Bob Perry, Noah Rubin	1:01
14.	"Sound The Horns" (Inspectah Deck and U-God featuring Sadat X)	Fizzy Womack, Andrew Kelley, Noah Rubin, Gintas Janusonis, Josh Werner	3:15
15.	"Enlightened Statues" (RZA)	The Revelations, Bob Perry, Noah Rubin	1:37
16.	"NYC Crack" (RZA featuring Thea Van Seijen)	RZA, Fizzy Womack, Andrew Kelley	3:20
17.	"One Last Question..."	Noah Rubin	0:10
