= Ante Up (song) =

2000 single by M.O.P.

"Ante Up (Robbin-Hoodz Theory)"
- Cover for the remix.

Single by M.O.P.

from the album Warriorz
- Released: September 9, 2000
- Genre: East Coast hip-hop, hardcore hip-hop
- Length: 4:07
- Label: Loud/Relativity; 1778 (U.S.); Loud/Epic; EK 91445 (Canada); 498277 (international)
- Songwriters: Eric Murray, Jamal Grinnage, Darryl Pittman
- Producer: DR Period

M.O.P. singles chronology
"G Building" (2000)	"Ante Up (Robbin-Hoodz Theory)" (2000)	"Cold as Ice" (2001)

"Ante Up (Robbing-Hoodz Theory)" (rendered on digital platforms as "Ante Up (Robbin Hoodz Theory)", and also simply known as "Ante Up") is a song by American hip hop duo M.O.P. from their fourth studio album Warriorz (2000). Seen as their breakthrough single, it was released in 2000 and reached number 7 on the UK Singles Chart. A remix of the song features Busta Rhymes, Remy Ma (credited as Remy Martin) and Teflon. The remix CD includes an additional version which features Funkmaster Flex.

== Background and composition ==
In an interview with Zilla Rocca at Passion of Weiss, "It's a saying that we got from my mother, every time someone comes through the door she’s like, 'Where it's at? Ante up.' Just the fact that we took it from the street corner—there was two meaning to the record. It was ante up, we've been in this game too long you guys see how we demolish the stage, how we make short work of the main major artists when we get on their records and you still won't give us the props and the recognition that we deserve."

The song is based around a sample from the Sam & Dave song "Soul Sister, Brown Sugar".

== Music video ==
The music video for the song was directed by Little X. It features M.O.P. performing the song at Herbert Von King Park in Bedford-Stuyvesant Brooklyn, on stage. It features cameo appearances from Gang Starr, Lord Have Mercy, Easy Mo Bee, Ralph McDaniels, DJ Green Lantern, Buckshot of Black Moon, Steele of Smif-N-Wessun, Method Man, Afu-Ra, and Tony Touch.

== Usage in media ==
"Ante Up" was featured in several films within years of its release, such as The Last Castle, Brown Sugar, Dickie Roberts: Former Child Star, the dance film You Got Served, 30 Minutes or Less Def Jam Icon and Teenage Mutant Ninja Turtles: Mutant Mayhem. The song was also featured in an episode of the short lived television series Robbery Homicide Division, as well as an episode of Brooklyn Nine-Nine ("The Chopper"), an episode of The Mindy Project ("In the Club") and an episode of Superstore ("Mannequin").

In 2003, the song was sampled by Javine Hylton for her debut single "Real Things". It was later sampled by John Cena in the song "The Time Is Now". M.O.P. eventually sued, but later dropped legal proceedings for the alleged unlawful sampling.

The guitar version of the song can be heard in the video game Midnight Club 3: Dub Edition.

In 2014, it was used for an advert for O2 Bundles in the UK, and is used in British TV show Soccer AM in a segment entitled "that's obscene, that is".

In 2017, YouTuber and member of the Sidemen, Wroetoshaw, sampled the song for his KSI diss track KSI Sucks, which, as of January 2023, has over 70 million views on YouTube. In 2018, Wroetoshaw sampled the song again for his RiceGum diss track, entitled Ricegum Sucks. This has, as of January 2023, over 30 million views on YouTube.

== Charts ==
=== Weekly charts ===
Weekly chart performance for "Ante Up"
Chart (2001)	Peak position
Austria (Ö3 Austria Top 40)	30
Belgium (Ultratip Bubbling Under Flanders)	2
Belgium (Ultratip Bubbling Under Wallonia)	15
Germany (GfK)	21
Ireland (IRMA)	26
Netherlands (Single Top 100)	33
UK Singles (Official Charts)	7
UK Indie (Official Charts)	1
UK Hip Hop/R&B (Official Charts)	2
US Hot R&B/Hip-Hop Songs (Billboard)	74
US Hot Rap Songs (Billboard)	19

=== Year-end charts ===
2001 year-end chart performance for "Ante Up"
Chart (2001)	Position
Germany (Official German Charts)	93

== Certifications ==
Region	Certification	Certified units/sales
Germany (BVMI)	Gold	250,000^{‡}
United Kingdom (BPI)	Gold	400,000^{‡}
^{‡} Sales+streaming figures based on certification alone.
