= St. Marxmen =

Mixtape by M.O.P.
- Released: October 18, 2005
- Genre: East Coast hip-hop; hardcore hip-hop
- Label: Koch
- Producer: D. Brown; DJ Premier; Tommy Tee; 9th Wonder; Nottz

M.O.P. chronology
Mash Out Posse (2004)	St. Marxmen (2005)	Ghetto Warfare (2006)

Professional ratings
Review scores
Source	Rating
RapReviews	7.5/10

St. Marxmen is a mixtape by M.O.P. It is a mixture of new songs, unreleased songs from the Roc-A-Fella era and some cameos such as Ol' Dirty Bastard's "Pop Shots" (Remix).

== Track listing ==
1. "Flip Intro" – 1:07
2. "Pain" – 3:56
3. "Big Boy Game" – 2:44
4. "It's Hard to Tell" (featuring Foxx and Inf) – 3:29
5. "Suicide" (featuring Teflon) – 3:26
6. "Hip Hop Cops" (featuring Wyclef Jean) – 4:59
7. "Pop Shots" (remix) (featuring ODB) – 3:42
8. "Classical Skit" – 0:15
9. "Put It in the Air" (featuring Jay-Z) – 4:03
10. "Skit" – 0:09
11. "Muddy Waters" – 4:16
12. "Party Like a Rock Star" – 3:59
13. "Instigator" – 5:21
14. "Take a Minute" – 3:00
15. "G Boy Stance" – 4:15
16. "The Wedding" (Skit) – 4:32
17. "Second Thoughts" [bonus track] – 4:11

== Charts ==
Chart (2005)	Peak position
US Independent Albums (Billboard)	36
US Top R&B/Hip-Hop Albums (Billboard)	62
