= M.O.P. =

American hip hop duo from Brooklyn, New York

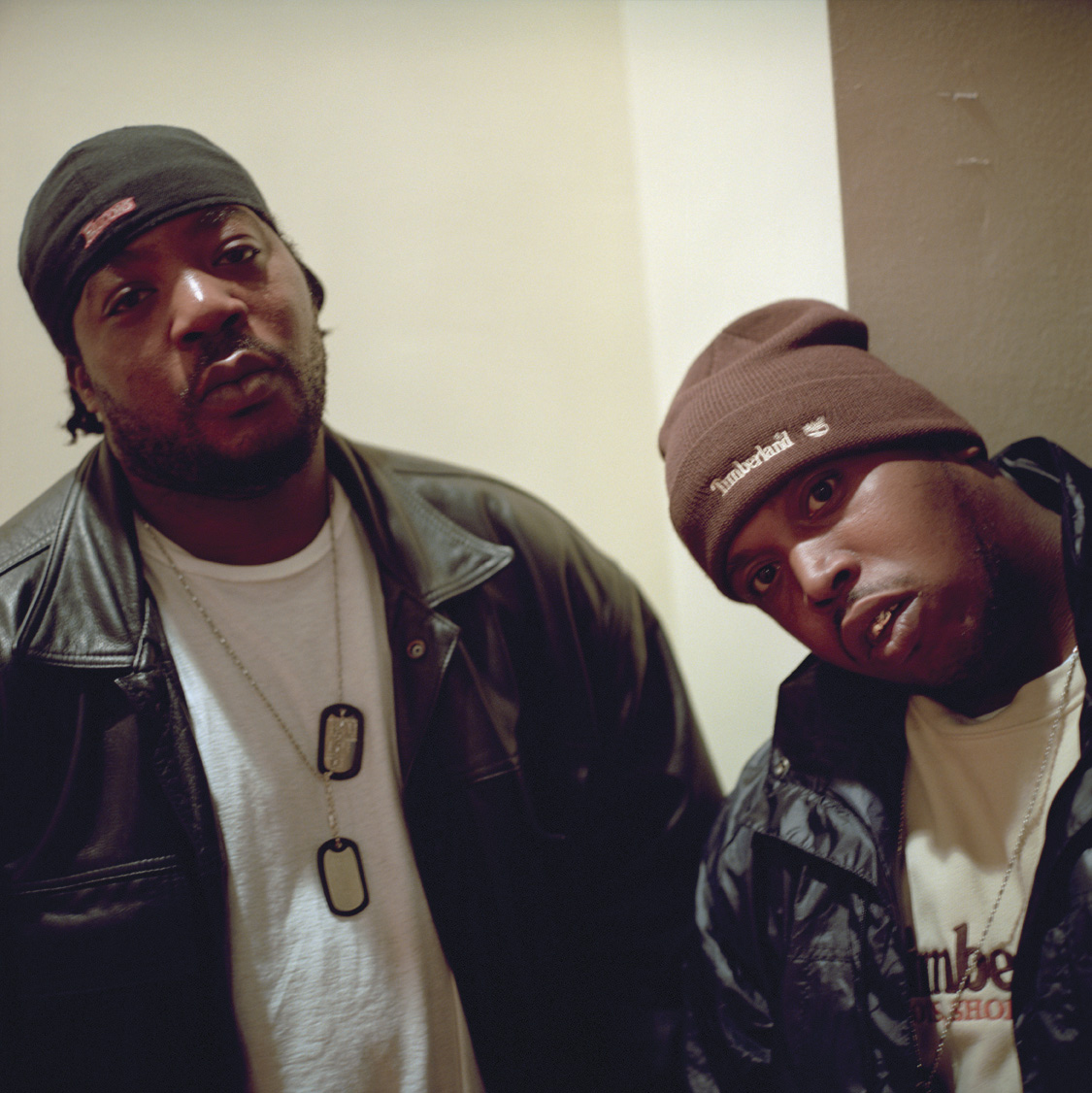
- M.O.P. in 2001

Background information
- Also known as: Mash Out Posse; The Marxmen
- Origin: Brooklyn, New York City, U.S.
- Genres: East Coast hip-hop; hardcore hip-hop
- Works: M.O.P. discography
- Years active: 1992–present
- Labels: First Family; Nature Sounds; Relativity; Loud; Epic; Koch; Interscope; G-Unit; Full Clip; Def Jam; Roc-A-Fella
- Members: Lil' Fame; Billy Danze

M.O.P. (short for Mash Out Posse) are an American hip-hop duo composed of East Coast rappers Billy Danze and Lil' Fame, best known for their song "Ante Up." The group has frequently collaborated with DJ Premier. The group are part of the Gang Starr Foundation. Fame occasionally produces under the moniker Fizzy Womack and has produced tracks on every M.O.P. release since 1996's Firing Squad. He has also worked for other artists, including Kool G Rap and Wu-Tang Clan.

== Origin ==
Lil' Fame (Jamal Grinnage; born April 9, 1976) and Billy Danze (Eric Murray; born November 15, 1974) grew up together in the neighborhood of Brownsville, Brooklyn. They formed a street gang called Mash Out Posse. They later formed a hip-hop duo under the same name. Danze reported that they kept "losing people in between albums;" their music often reflects emotional themes with a driving beat.

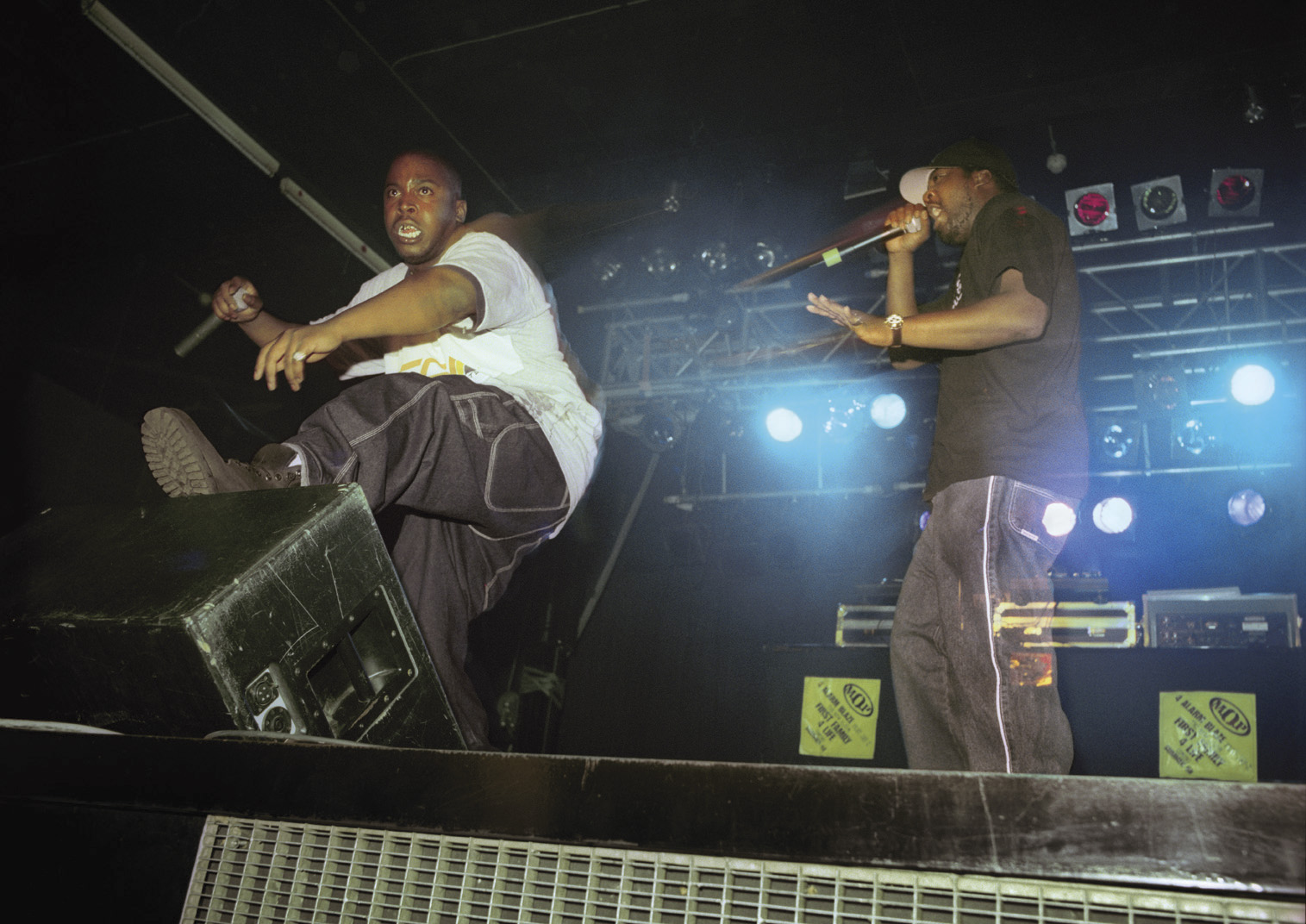
Performing in Hamburg, Germany, in 1999

== History ==
=== Rise to Fame (1992–2005) ===
After contributing to the 1992 compilation The Hill That's Real, M.O.P. debuted in 1993 with the single "How About Some Hardcore?", which appeared on the soundtrack for the film House Party 3. The underground success of their single, promoted by a low-budget video from then-unknown director Hype Williams, led to their debut album To the Death. It was released in 1994 through the label Select Records, almost fully produced by DR Period.

In 1996, M.O.P. released their second album, Firing Squad, under the label Relativity Records. Production duties now involved Gang Starr's DJ Premier and Lil' Fame himself, and the group continued to grow their following. In 1998, M.O.P. released the Handle Ur Bizness EP, soon followed by the album First Family 4 Life. Once again, much of the record was produced by DJ Premier and Lil' Fame. The album also featured guest appearances by Guru of Gang Starr, Treach of Naughty by Nature, OC of Diggin' in the Crates Crew, and Jay-Z. The album was the most stolen album from New York City's HMV stores in 1998.

In 2000, they released their fourth album, Warriorz, this time through Loud Records. Mainstream radio began playing the first single, "Ante Up", produced by DR Period, whom they had not worked with since their debut. The single was a hit and propelled the album to No. 25 on the Billboard 200 chart. The follow-up single, "Cold As Ice", a self-produced track (which featured a sample of "Cold As Ice" by Foreigner), also received radio airplay, although partially censored for radio play. It was used in the UK in a TV advert for Maclean's Ice Whitening toothpaste. Both "Ante Up" and "Cold as Ice" reached the top ten on the UK Singles Chart, peaking at No. 7 and No. 4 respectively. In 2001, M.O.P. collaborated with Krumbsnatcha to make the song "W.O.L.V.E.S.", which appeared on the soundtrack for the film Training Day.

In 2001, a successful remix of "Ante Up" was released featuring Busta Rhymes, Remy Ma, and Teflon. That same year, they collaborated on a song titled "Life is Good" with the pop group LFO. The song reached No. 40 on Billboard's Hot Singles Sales chart. Both singles continued the Posse's mainstream success.

In 2002, Loud Records folded, leaving the group stranded. In 2003, Loud's parent label Sony/Columbia issued an album titled 10 Years and Gunnin'. M.O.P. later joined Jay-Z and Damon Dash's Roc-A-Fella Records. Their first recording for the label was a guest appearance on Jay-Z's album The Blueprint 2: The Gift & the Curse; they were set to release their album titled Ghetto Warfare, but the anticipated album was shelved. Two other albums were recorded: one titled The Last Generation, and the other titled Kill Nigga Die Slo Bluckka Bluckka Bloaoow Blood Sweat Tears and We Out. A Dash-produced track "It's That Simple" with Spice Girl Victoria Beckham was created and received a premiere on radio stations in July 2003. This generated mixed reviews and further criticism, specifically that Beckham was unconvincing as an urban act.

During this period, the group released a slew of mixtapes and appeared on soundtracks to films such as Bad Boys II. They contributed two songs ("Ground Zero" and "Put it in the Air") to the video game NFL Street 2, and ("Fire") to Fight Night 2004. They also contributed Ante Up to the third installment of the popular Midnight Club racing video game series. In 2004, M.O.P. joined the American rap rock band Linkin Park on the second stage of the Projekt Revolution Tour.

The group also released a mixtape called Marxmen Cinema (under the name The Marxmen), as well as a self-titled rap rock album (under the name Mash Out Posse), recorded as a collaboration with heavy metal group Shiner Massive. In 2004, Damon Dash sold his share of Roc-A-Fella to new Def Jam president, Jay-Z, and kept M.O.P. on his new label, Dame Dash Music Group. Following this, the group announced their departure from Roc-A-Fella and Dame Dash in May 2005.

=== Modern success (2005–present) ===
In 2005, M.O.P. began affiliating with 50 Cent's G-Unit Records, around the same time as the Queens rap duo Mobb Deep. In July of the same year, they were signed to the label. The duo completed the song "When Death Becomes You" with 50 Cent, which was featured on the Get Rich or Die Tryin' soundtrack, and also contributed their rap vocals in a remix of "I'll Whip Ya Head Boy". At the end of the year, M.O.P. released a compilation album entitled M.O.P. Salutes the St. Marxmen, consisting of both new and old tracks. In July 2006, M.O.P. released the long-shelved Ghetto Warfare.

In February 2008, M.O.P. separated from G-Unit Records, due to creative differences. Billy and Fame released their next album, The Foundation, in 2009 on E1 Music. The album featured production from DJ Premier, Statik Selektah, The Alchemist, and Jake One, and guest appearances from Heltah Skeltah, Busta Rhymes, Jadakiss, Beanie Sigel, Styles P and Redman. The first single from the album "Blow the Horns" featuring Busta Rhymes, and "Street Life," a collaboration with dancehall artist Demarco, were both released on the internet.

On October 14, 2008, M.O.P. filed suit in a New York Federal Court against World Wrestling Entertainment (WWE) and John Cena. The group argued that Cena and the WWE stole parts of their song "Ante Up" for Cena's theme song "The Time is Now". The theme song is also featured as the first track on Cena's album You Can't See Me. The lawsuit has since been dropped, and it is unknown if a settlement was reached outside of court.

In June 2009, a Wu-Tang Chamber Music compilation album was released, the majority of which was produced by Lil' Fame (as Fizzy Womack). M.O.P. themselves appeared on the track "Ill Figures" alongside Raekwon and Kool G Rap. Lil' Fame also produced the 2011 Wu-Tang Clan compilation Legendary Weapons alongside Noah Rubin and Andrew Kelley.

On October 24, 2011, M.O.P. released "Get Yours", their first single from their collaborative album Sparta with the German production team Snowgoons, on Babygrand Records.

Lil Fame and Termanology teamed up on a collaborative album, Fizzyology. It was released on November 6, 2012, via Brick Records.

On November 18, 2014, M.O.P. released a new album, Street Certified, on Nature Sounds. It is executive produced by DJ Premier and features guest appearances from Maino, Mobb Deep, and Busta Rhymes. In 2019, M.O.P. released the single "Never Give Up" with DJ Tomekk.

Danze and Fame each contributed a verse to DJ Kay Slay's 2020 track "Rolling 50 Deep" alongside 48 other MCs.

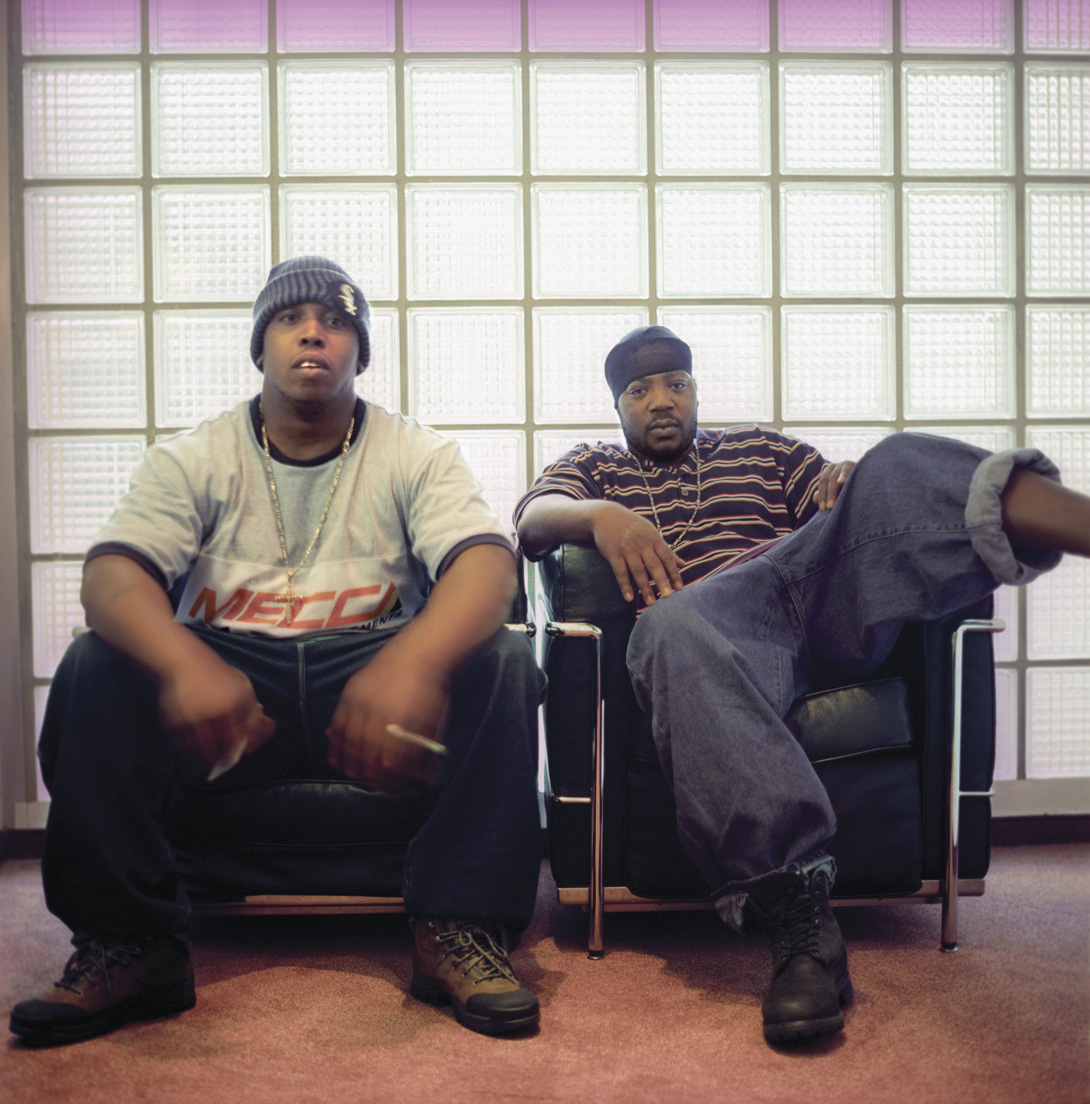
1999

== Discography ==
Studio albums

- To the Death (1994)
- Firing Squad (1996)
- First Family 4 Life (1998)
- Warriorz (2000)
- Foundation (2009)
- Street Certified (2014)

Collaborative albums

- Sparta (with Snowgoons) (2011)
