= To the Death (M.O.P. album) =

Studio album by M.O.P.
- Released: April 5, 1994
- Studios: I.N.S. (New York City); Next Nevel (Brooklyn); House of Hits (New York City)
- Genres: East Coast hip-hop; hardcore hip-hop
- Length: 43:29
- Label: Select
- Producers: Silver D (also exec.); DR Period

M.O.P. chronology
To the Death (1994)	Firing Squad (1996)

Singles from To the Death
- 1. "How About Some Hardcore" Released: 1993; 2. "Rugged Neva Smoove" Released: 1994; 3. "To The Death (Remix)" Released: 1995

Professional ratings
Review scores
Source	Rating
AllMusic	4/5 stars
RapReviews	7/10

To the Death is the debut studio album by American hip-hop duo M.O.P., from Brownsville, New York. It was released on April 5, 1994, via Select Records, and was produced entirely by DR Period, except for track "Guns N' Roses", produced by Silver D.

== Track listing ==
All tracks are written by Jamal Grinnage, Eric Murray, and Darryl Pittman, except where noted. All tracks are produced by DR Period, except where noted.

No.	Title	Writer(s)	Producer(s)	Length
1.	"Crimetime 1-718"			1:45
2.	"Rugged Neva Smoove"			5:07
3.	"Ring Ding"			3:48
4.	"Heistmasters"			4:00
5.	"Blue Steel"			3:26
6.	"Who Is M.O.P.?"			0:14
7.	"To the Death"			3:51
8.	"Big Mal"			0:07
9.	"Top of the Line"			3:30
10.	"This Is Your Brain"			0:19
11.	"Drama Lord"			3:34
12.	"F.A.G. (Fake Ass Gangsta)"			4:51
13.	"How About Some Hardcore"			4:32
14.	"Positive Influences"			0:16
15.	"Guns N Roses"	Grinnage; Murray; David Brown	Silver D	4:09
Total length:				43:29

== Personnel ==
- Eric Murray – main performer
- Jamal Gerard Grinnage – main performer
- Darryl Pittman – producer (tracks: 1–14)
- David 'Silver D' Brown – producer (track 15), executive producer, A&R director
- Lawrence Elliott – executive producer
- Kevin Reynolds – recording engineer (tracks: 2, 15), mix engineer (tracks: 3, 4, 5, 7, 9, 11, 12)
- Joanne Carrero – recording engineer (tracks: 3, 4, 7, 9, 11)
- Chris Gehringer – mastering
- Ian Thornell – artwork
- Peter Bodtke – photography

== Charts ==
Chart (1994)	Peak position
US Top R&B/Hip-Hop Albums (Billboard)	68
