= Warriorz =

Studio album by M.O.P.
- Released: October 10, 2000
- Recorded: 1999–2000
- Genre: East Coast hip-hop; hardcore hip-hop
- Length: 73:16
- Label: Loud; Relativity 1778 (U.S.) Loud; Epic EK 91445 (Canada) 498277 (international)
- Producer: DJ Premier; Fizzy Womack; DR Period; Mahogany; Laze E Laze; Nottz; Chris Coker; Curt Cazal

M.O.P. chronology
| First Family 4 Life (1998) | Warriorz (2000) | 10 Years and Gunnin' (2003) |

Singles from Warriorz
- 1. "G-Building" Released: 2000; 2. "Ante Up (Robbin Hoodz Theory)" Released: 2000; 3. "Cold As Ice" Released: 2001

Professional ratings
Review scores
| Source | Rating |
|---|---|
| AllMusic | 4/5 stars |
| HipHopDX | 3.5/5 |
| NME | 3.5/5 stars |
| RapReviews | 9.5/10 |
| Rolling Stone | 3/5 stars |
| The Source | 4/5 stars |
| Spin | 8/10 |
| The Village Voice | A− |
| USA Today | 3/4 stars |

Warriorz is the fourth full-length studio album released by M.O.P., a hip hop duo composed of emcees Billy Danze and Lil' Fame. The album was released on October 10, 2000. Despite the growing popularity of M.O.P., this album marked their last major-label-affiliated release. Loud Records folded in 2002 and M.O.P. did not follow other Loud artists to Columbia Records. Warriorz is M.O.P.'s most successful album by far. It debuted 65 places higher on the Billboard 200 charts than its previously highest-selling album, First Family 4 Life.

This album spawned the radio hit "Ante Up", which subsequently spawned a remix that also featured Busta Rhymes, Remy Ma, and M.O.P. associate Teflon. "Ante Up" appeared in the soundtracks of several films after its release due to its popularity, featuring in War on Everyone, The Last Castle, Bodied, Brown Sugar, Dickie Roberts: Former Child Star, A Simple Favor, the dance film You Got Served, and 30 Minutes or Less. The song was also featured in an episode of the short lived television series Robbery Homicide Division, as well as an episode of Brooklyn Nine-Nine ("The Chopper") and an episode of The Mindy Project ("In the Club").

== Track listing ==
| No. | Title | Composer(s) | Producer(s) | Sample(s) | Length |
|---|---|---|---|---|---|
| 1 | "Premier Intro" | C. Martin | DJ Premier | | 1:34 |
| 2 | "Welcome to Brownsville" (featuring Teflon) | L. Starling; E. Murray; J. Grinnage | Fizzy Womack | "So Deep in Love" by Deniece Williams | 3:59 |
| 3 | "Everyday" (featuring the Product G&B) | E. Murray; J. Grinnage; D. McRae; M. Moore-Hough | DJ Premier | "On the Radio" by Archie Bell & the Drells | 4:50 |
| 4 | "Ante Up (Robbing-Hoodz Theory)" (featuring Funkmaster Flex) | E. Murray; J. Grinnage; D. Pittman | DR Period | "Soul Sister Brown Sugar" by Sam & Dave | 4:08 |
| 5 | "Face Off" | E. Murray; J. Grinnage; C. Martin | DJ Premier | "Just a Prisoner" and "It's Too Late" by Billy Paul | 4:06 |
| 6 | "Warriorz" | E. Murray; J. Grinnage; Imsomie Leeper | Mahogany | "I Forgot to Be Your Lover" by the Mad Lads | 4:43 |
| 7 | "G-Building" | E. Murray; J. Grinnage | M.O.P. | "Don't Call Me Nigger, Whitey" by Sly & the Family Stone | 3:36 |
| 8 | "Old Timerz" | E. Murray; J. Grinnage; L. Elliot | Laze E Laze | | 3:50 |
| 9 | "On the Front Line" | E. Murray; J. Grinnage; C. Martin | DJ Premier | "And God Made Eve" by Pino Donaggio | 3:06 |
| 10 | "Nig-Gotiate" | E. Murray; J. Grinnage | Fizzy Womack | | 2:26 |
| 11 | "Follow Instructions" | E. Murray; J. Grinnage; C. Martin | DJ Premier | "Blind Alley" by the Emotions; "Just Memories" by Eddie Kendricks; "Burning of the Midnight Lamp" by Jimi Hendrix | 5:03 |
| 12 | "Calm Down" | E. Murray; J. Grinnage | Fizzy Womack | "Design for Living" by Nona Hendryx | 3:39 |
| 13 | "Power" | E. Murray; J. Grinnage; L. Elliot | Fizzy Womack; Laze E Laze | "Lover Man" by Grover Washington, Jr. | 4:30 |
| 14 | "Home Sweet Home" (featuring Lord Have Mercy) | E. Murray; J. Grinnage; D. Lamb; W. Notise | Nottz | | 3:58 |
| 15 | "Background Niggaz" | E. Murray; J. Grinnage; D. Pittman | DR Period | "That Kind of Fire" by Facts of Life | 3:54 |
| 16 | "Cold as Ice" | E. Murray; J. Grinnage | Fizzy Womack | "Cold as Ice" by Foreigner; "Your Smiling Face" by James Taylor | 4:04 |
| 17 | "Operation Lockdown" | E. Murray; J. Grinnage; C. Coker | Chris Coker | "Come Dance With Me" by One Way | 4:05 |
| 18 | "Roll Call" | E. Murray; J. Grinnage; C. Martin | DJ Premier | "Peace of Mind" by S.O.U.L. | 4:03 |
| 19 | "Foundation" | E. Murray; J. Grinnage; C. Small | Curt Cazal | | 3:42 |

Japanese edition bonus track

| No. | Title | Producer(s) | Length |
|---|---|---|---|
| 20 | "Stress Y'all" | First Family | 3:39 |

== Personnel ==
Credits are adapted from the album's liner notes.

- DJ Premier – executive producer, mixing
- Lawrence "Laze E Laze" Elliott – executive producer, keyboard
- Lil Fame – drums
- Crystal Asia – background vocals
- Rocko – background vocals
- Tony Dawsey – mastering
- Eddie Sancho – mixing, recording
- Rocklogic – recording, mixing
- Vinny Nicoletti – recording, mixing
- DeJuan "DK" Perignon – recording, engineering
- Eric Steinen – engineering
- Dexter Thibou – engineering
- Kiori – engineering
- Oronde "Big O" Haggans – engineering
- Doug Guemes – engineering
- Sia – engineering
- Malachi "17" Allah – A&R
- Mike "Trauma" Dewar – A&R
- Lincoln Weir – A&R administration
- Trakelle Frazier – A&R administration
- Sanchez Stanfield – creative director
- Kerry DeBruce – art direction, design
- Anders Jones – photography
- Parris Bowe – product manager
- Sarah Honda – project coordinator
- Mark Spier – sample clearance

== Chart positions ==
=== Album ===
| Chart (2000) | Peak position |
|---|---|
| Austrian Albums (Ö3 Austria) | 48 |
| German Albums (Offizielle Top 100) | 17 |
| Scottish Albums (OCC) | 37 |
| Swiss Albums (Schweizer Hitparade) | 57 |
| UK Albums (OCC) | 40 |
| UK R&B Albums (OCC) | 8 |
| US Billboard 200 | 25 |
| US Independent Albums (Billboard) | 2 |
| US Top R&B/Hip-Hop Albums (Billboard) | 5 |

=== Singles ===
"G-Building"
| Chart (2000) | Peak position |
|---|---|
| US Hot Rap Songs (Billboard) | 38 |

"Ante Up (Robbin Hoodz Theory)"
| Chart (2000) | Peak position |
|---|---|
| US Hot R&B/Hip-Hop Songs (Billboard) | 74 |
| US Hot Rap Songs (Billboard) | 19 |
| US R&B/Hip-Hop Airplay (Billboard) | 63 |

"Cold As Ice"
| Chart (2001) | Peak position |
|---|---|
| UK Singles (OCC) | 4 |
| UK Dance (OCC) | 10 |
