= First Family 4 Life =

Studio album by M.O.P.
- Released: August 11, 1998
- Studio: D&D (New York City); Pyramid Sound (Ithaca, New York)
- Genre: East Coast hip-hop; hardcore hip-hop
- Length: 1:04:56
- Label: Relativity
- Producer: Laze E Laze (also exec.); DJ Premier (also exec.); M.O.P.; Da Beatminerz

M.O.P. chronology
Firing Squad (1996)	First Family 4 Life (1998)	Warriorz (2000)

Professional ratings
Review scores
Source	Rating
AllMusic	4/5 stars
RapReviews	9/10
The Source	4/5 stars

First Family 4 Life is the third studio album by American hip-hop duo M.O.P.. It was released on August 11, 1998, via Relativity Records. DJ Premier produced five songs on the album and also serves as an executive producer of the project (with Laze E Laze). The LP features more guest-appearances than previous M.O.P. projects; cameos include Jay-Z, Freddie Foxxx, Gang Starr, O.C., Heather B., Teflon, and Treach.

== Track listing ==
No.	Title	Producer(s)	Length
1.	"Billy Skit"		0:58
2.	"Breakin' the Rules"	DJ Premier	4:12
3.	"4 Alarm Blaze" (featuring Teflon and Jay-Z)	Laze E Laze	4:29
4.	"Blood Sweat and Tears"	Laze E Laze	4:42
5.	"Down 4 Whateva" (featuring O.C.)	M.O.P.	3:33
6.	"Facing Off"	M.O.P., Laze E. Laze	3:38
7.	"My Kinda Nigga Part II" (featuring Heather B.)	Da Beatminerz	4:07
8.	"I Luv" (featuring Freddie Foxxx)	DJ Premier	4:50
9.	"Salute Part II" (featuring Gang Starr)	DJ Premier	4:17
10.	"Ride with Us"	Laze E Laze	4:43
11.	"Handle Ur Bizness" (DJ Premier Remix)	DJ Premier	4:14
12.	"Fly Nigga Hill Figga"	M.O.P.	4:07
13.	"What the Future Holds"	M.O.P.	3:57
14.	"Downtown Swinga '98"	DJ Premier	4:13
15.	"Fame Skit"		1:52
16.	"Brooklyn/Jersey Get Wild" (featuring Treach)	Laze E Laze	4:07
17.	"New York Salute"	M.O.P.	2:56

Japanese edition bonus tracks
No.	Title	Producer(s)	Length
18.	"Way of the World"	Laze E Laze	4:04
19.	"Move Something"	M.O.P.	4:24

== Charts ==
Chart (1998)	Peak position
US Billboard 200	80
US Top R&B/Hip-Hop Albums (Billboard)	14
