= Firing Squad (album) =

Studio album by M.O.P.
- Released: October 22, 1996
- Studio: D&D; Gabriella; Fire House
- Genre: East Coast hip-hop; hardcore hip-hop
- Length: 1:04:58
- Label: Relativity
- Producer: Laze E Laze (also exec.); DJ Premier; M.O.P; Jaz-O; Ali Dee

M.O.P. chronology
To the Death (1994)	Firing Squad (1996)	First Family 4 Life (1998)

Professional ratings
Review scores
Source	Rating
AllMusic	4/5 stars
Muzik	4/5 stars
RapReviews	7/10
The Source	3.5/5 stars

Firing Squad is the second studio album by the American hip-hop duo M.O.P., from Brownsville, New York. It was released on October 22, 1996, via Relativity Records. It was produced by DJ Premier, Big Jaz, Ali Dee, M.O.P. & Laze E Laze and it also features a guest appearance from Kool G Rap. The whole album was mixed and overseen by DJ Premier, who continued the work for the next two M.O.P. albums. The album is broken down track-by-track by M.O.P. in Brian Coleman's book Check the Technique.

== Track listing ==
No.	Title	Writer(s)	Producer(s)	Length
1.	"Intro"			0:50
2.	"Firing Squad" (Skit)			0:41
3.	"Firing Squad" (featuring Teflon)	E. Murray; J. Grinnage; C. Martin	DJ Premier	4:21
4.	"New Jack City" (featuring Teflon)	E. Murray; J. Grinnage; C. Martin	DJ Premier	2:53
5.	"Stick to Ya Gunz" (featuring Kool G Rap)	E. Murray; J. Grinnage; N. Wilson; C. Martin	DJ Premier	3:51
6.	"Anticipation"	E. Murray; J. Grinnage; L. Parker; L. Elliott; C. Martin	M.O.P.; Laze E Laze (co.)	4:38
7.	"Born 2 Kill"	E. Murray; J. Grinnage; J. Burks	Big Jaz	4:33
8.	"Brownsville"	E. Murray; J. Grinnage; C. Martin	DJ Premier	4:41
9.	"Salute"	E. Murray; J. Grinnage; C. Martin	DJ Premier	2:14
10.	"World Famous"	E. Murray; J. Grinnage; J. Burks; C. Mann; D. Hathaway; R. Flack	Big Jaz	4:11
11.	"Downtown Swinga ('96)"	E. Murray; J. Grinnage; C. Martin	DJ Premier	3:41
12.	"Lifestyles of a Ghetto Child"	E. Murray; J. Grinnage; J. Burks	Big Jaz	3:50
13.	"Revolution"	E. Murray; J. Grinnage; L. Elliott	Laze E Laze; M.O.P.	5:33
14.	"Illside of Town"	E. Murray; J. Grinnage; L. Elliott	Laze E Laze; M.O.P.	3:35
15.	"Nothin' 2 Lose"	E. Murray; J. Grinnage; A. Theodore	Ali Dee	4:31
16.	"Dedication"			1:19
17.	"Dead and Gone" (featuring Battle)	E. Murray; J. Grinnage; L. Elliott; C. Mayfield	Laze E Laze; M.O.P.	4:58
18.	"Born 2 Kill" (Jazz Mix)		Big Jaz	4:38
Total length:				1:04:58

== Charts ==
Chart (1996)	Peak position
US Billboard 200	94
US Top R&B/Hip-Hop Albums (Billboard)	12
