= Brand Nubian discography =

This is the discography of American hip hop group Brand Nubian. The group released six studio albums and three compilation albums that featured hit singles.

== Albums ==
| Title | Album details | Peak chart positions | | |
| Title | Album details | US | US R&B/HH | US Heat |
|---|---|---|---|---|
| One for All | Released: December 4, 1990; Label: Elektra; Formats: CD, LP, Cassette, digital download | 130 | 34 | 32 |
| In God We Trust | Released: February 2, 1993; Label: Elektra; Formats: CD, LP, Cassette, digital download | 12 | 4 | — |
| Everything Is Everything | Released: November 1, 1994; Label: Elektra; Formats: CD, LP, Cassette, digital download | 54 | 13 | — |
| Foundation | Released: September 29, 1998; Label: Arista; Formats: CD, LP, Cassette, digital download | 59 | 12 | — |
| Fire in the Hole | Released: August 10, 2004; Label: Babygrande Records; Formats: CD, LP, digital download | — | 57 | — |
| Time's Runnin' Out | Released: August 21, 2007; Label: Traffic Entertainment; Formats: CD | — | — | — |
"—" denotes releases that did not chart

== Compilation album ==
Album information
The Very Best of Brand Nubian
- Released: 2001
- Formats: CD, digital download
Rhino Hi-Five : Brand Nubian
- Released: 2005
- Formats: Digital download
Enter the Dubstep 2
- Released: 2010
- Formats: CD, digital download

== Singles ==
Information
"Brand Nubian"
- Released: 1989
- Label: Elektra Records
- B-Side: "Feels So Good"
- Note: Both tracks appeared on the CD version of "One For All", and in re-presses of the LP.
- Samples: Rigor Mortis by Cameo
"Wake Up"
- Released: 1990
- Label: Elektra Records
- B-Side: "Drop the Bomb"
"All for One"
- Released: 1991
- Label: Elektra Records
- B-Side: "Concerto in X Minor"
"Slow Down"
- Released: 1991
- Label: Elektra Records
- B-Side: "To the Right"
- Samples: What I Am by Edie Brickell & New Bohemians.
"Punks Jump Up to Get Beat Down"
- Released: 1992
- Label: Elektra Records
- B-Side: "Punks Jump Up to Get Beat Down (Remix)"
"Allah U Akbar"
- Released: 1993
- Label: Elektra Records
- B-Side: "Steal Ya Ho"
"Love Me or Leave Me Alone"
- Released: 1993
- Label: Elektra Records
- B-Side: "The Travel Jam"
"Word is Bond"
- Released: 1994
- Label: Elektra Records
- B-Side: "Straight Off Da Head"
"Hold On"
- Released: 1995
- Label: Elektra Records
- B-Side: "Step Into Da Cipher", "Alladat"
"A Child is Born"
- Released: 1997
- Label: Loud Records
- B-Side:
"The Return"
- Released: 1998
- Label: Arista Records
- B-Side: "Brand Nubian"
"Don't Let it Go to Your Head"
- Released: 1998
- Label: Arista Records
- B-Side: "Back Up Off the Wall"
"Let's Dance"
- Released: 1999
- Label: Arista Records
- B-Side:
"Rockin' It"
- Released: 2000
- Label: Kurrup Money Records
- B-Side: "Spend It" (by D.I.T.C.)
"Walking on a Cloud"
- Released: 2003
- Label: Spun Records
- B-Side: "Shine"
"Whatever Happened...?"
- Released: 2004
- Label: Babygrande Records
- B-Side: "Momma"
"Who Wanna Be a Star? (It's Brand Nu Baby!)"
- Released: 2004
- Label: Babygrande Records
- B-Side: "Just Don't Learn"
"Young Son"
- Released: 2004
- Label: Babygrande Records
- B-Side: "Still Livin' in the Ghetto"

== Charted singles ==
This list include releases by Grand Puba and Sadat X.

| Year | Title | Peak chart positions | | | Album |
| Year | Title | US | U.S. R&B | U.S. Rap | Album |
|---|---|---|---|---|---|
| 1990 | "Wake Up" | — | 92 | 5 | One for All |
| 1991 | "Slow Down" | — | 63 | 3 | One for All |
| 1992 | "All for One" | — | — | 17 | One for All |
| 1992 | "360 Degrees (What Goes Around)" (Grand Puba) | 68 | 30 | 1 | Reel to Reel |
| 1993 | "Check It Out" (Grand Puba feat. Mary J. Blige) | — | 85 | 13 | Reel to Reel |
| 1993 | "Punks Jump Up to Get Beat Down" | 77 | 42 | 2 | In God We Trust |
| 1993 | "Love Me or Leave Me Alone" | 92 | 68 | 13 | In God We Trust |
| 1994 | "Word Is Bond" | 94 | 64 | 11 | Everything Is Everything |
| 1995 | "Hold On" (Feat. Starr) | — | — | 39 | Everything Is Everything |
| 1995 | "I Like It (I Wanna Be Where You Are)" (Grand Puba) | 91 | 68 | 21 | 2000 |
| 1995 | "A Little of This" (Grand Puba) | — | 90 | — | 2000 |
| 1996 | "Hang 'Em High" (Sadat X) | 98 | 53 | 12 | Wild Cowboys |
| 1996 | "The Lump Lump" (Sadat X) | — | 85 | 20 | Wild Cowboys |
| 1998 | "Don't Let it Go to Your Head" | 54 | 24 | 3 | Foundation |
| 2000 | "Rockin' It" | — | — | 29 | Non-album single |
| 2000 | "Ka-Ching" (Sadat X feat. Hy Tymes) | — | — | 36 | The State of New York vs. Derek Murphy |
"—" denotes releases that did not chart

== Guest Appearances ==
| Year | Title | Artist | Album |
|---|---|---|---|
| 1991 | "Nitty Gritty" | KMD | Mr. Hood |
| 1992 | A Day in the Life" | Diamond D | Stunts, Blunts & Hip Hop |
| 1993 | "Lick Dem Muthaphuckas" | —N/a | Menace II Society (soundtrack) |
| 1993 | "Hey! Mr. Rude Bwoy" | Redd Foxx | As a Matter of Foxx |
| 1996 | "The Lump Lump (Nubian Mix)" | Sadat X | 12" |
| 1997 | "A Child Is Born" | —N/a | Soul in the Hole (soundtrack) |
| 1997 | "Keep It Bubblin'" | —N/a | Money Talks (soundtrack) |
| 1998 | "Time Is Running Out" | —N/a | Slam (soundtrack) |
| 1998 | "Hot This Year" | Kid Capri, Diamond D | Soundtrack to the Streets |
| 2009 | "This Joint Right Here (Remix)" | Grand Puba, Kid Capri | Retroactive |
| 2010 | "Long Years" | Sadat X | Wild Cowboys II |
