= The Very Best of Brand Nubian =

The Very Best of

Greatest hits album by Brand Nubian
- Released: September 18, 2001
- Recorded: 1989–1999
- Genre: Hip hop
- Length: 1:12:25
- Label: Rhino
- Producer: Brand Nubian; Chris "CL" Liggio; Diamond D; Stimulated Dummies
- Compiler: Barry "Rockbarry" Benson

Brand Nubian chronology
Foundation (1998)	The Very Best of (2001)	Fire in the Hole (2004)

Professional ratings
Review scores
Source	Rating
AllMusic	5/5 stars
The New Rolling Stone Album Guide	4/5 stars

The Very Best of Brand Nubian is the first greatest hits album by American hip hop group Brand Nubian. It was released on September 18, 2001 through Rhino Entertainment. Production was handled by members Grand Puba, Lord Jamar and Sadat X, as well as Diamond D, Stimulated Dummies and Chris "CL" Liggio, with Barry "Rockbarry" Benson serving as compilation producer. It features a lone guest appearance from Diamond D.

The album's front cover is referred to Brand Nubian's debut studio album One for All.

== Track listing ==
No.	Title	Writer(s)	Producer(s)	Length
1.	"All for One"	Lorenzo Dechalus; Maxwell Dixon; Derek Murphy	Brand Nubian	4:55
2.	"Feels So Good"	Dechalus; Murphy	Brand Nubian	5:04
3.	"Concerto in X Minor"	Dechalus; Murphy	Brand Nubian	3:57
4.	"Drop the Bomb"	Dechalus; Dixon; Murphy	Brand Nubian	5:01
5.	"Wake Up (Reprise in the Sunshine)"	Dechalus; Dixon; Murphy	Brand Nubian	5:21
6.	"Slow Down"	Dechalus; Dixon; Murphy; Brandon Aly; Edie Brickell; John Bush; John Houser; Kenny Withrow	Brand Nubian	5:03
7.	"Brand Nubian"	Dechalus; Dixon; Murphy	Brand Nubian	4:38
8.	"Slow Down" (Pete Rock's Newromix)	Dechalus; Dixon; Murphy; Aly; Brickell; Bush; Houser; Withrow	Brand Nubian	5:20
9.	"360° (What Goes Around)"	Dixon; Bonnie Miller	Grand Puba	4:01
10.	"Mind Your Business"	Dixon; Geeby Dajani; John Gamble; Dante Ross	Grand Puba; Stimulated Dummies	3:01
11.	"Allah U Akbar"	Dechalus; Murphy	Brand Nubian	4:49
12.	"Love Me or Leave Me Alone"	Dechalus; Murphy	Brand Nubian	4:34
13.	"Punks Jump Up to Get Beat Down"	Dechalus; Murphy; O'Kelly Isley Jr.; Ronald Isley; Rudolph Isley	Diamond D	4:31
14.	"Hold On"	Dechalus; Murphy; Mick Hucknall; Neil Moss	Lord Jamar	4:15
15.	"Punks Jump Up to Get Beat Down (Remix)" (featuring Diamond D)	Dechalus; Murphy; Isley Jr.; Isley; Isley	Diamond D	3:51
16.	"Don't Let It Go to Your Head"	Dechalus; Dixon; Murphy; Kenny Gamble; Leon Huff	Chris "CL" Liggio	4:04
Total length:				1:12:25

Notes

- Tracks 1 to 7 are taken from One for All ℗© 1990 Elektra Entertainment.
- Track 8 is taken from "Slow Down" 12" ℗© 1991 Elektra Entertainment.
- Track 9 is taken from Reel to Reel ℗© 1992 Elektra Entertainment.
- Track 10 is taken from "Ya Know How It Goes" 12" ℗ 1992 © 1993 Elektra Entertainment.
- Tracks 11 to 13 are taken from In God We Trust ℗© 1992 Elektra Entertainment.
- Track 14 is taken from Everything Is Everything ℗© 1994 Elektra Entertainment.
- Track 15 is taken from "Punks Jump Up to Get Beat Down" 12" ℗© 1992 Elektra Entertainment.
- Track 16 is taken from Foundation ℗© 1998 Arista Records, Inc.
