= DJ Alamo =

American rapper

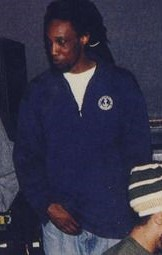
- Alamo in 1997.

Background information
- Also known as: Alamo; Alamo Jones; Ally
- Born: Keith Jones; October 16, 1968 (age 57); The Bronx, New York City, U.S.
- Origin: New Rochelle, New York, U.S.
- Genres: Hip hop
- Occupations: DJ; record producer
- Years active: 1989–present
- Labels: Elektra; Arista; Traffic
- Member of: Brand Nubian

Keith Jones (born October 16, 1968), also known by his stage name, DJ Alamo or Alamo. is an American DJ and producer, who is known for being one of the founding members of Brand Nubian.

== Early life ==
Alamo was born in the Bronx, New York City. He and Sadat X were childhood friends and grew up together in the Bronx. Alamo and Sadat X's fathers grew up together at Lincoln Projects in Harlem. Alamo's family moved to New Rochelle after nearby buildings in the Bronx began burning down. He is the eldest of two children; he has one sister. He started working as a DJ when he was in the seventh grade.

== Career ==
In 1989, Alamo was signed to Elektra Records after Grand Puba, finalizing a deal with A&R representative Dante Ross. As a DJ for Brand Nubian, he would contribute to producing songs on the group's first album, One for All. Alamo said that he produced "Concerto in X Minor", which Sadat X would rap on. He also produced "Slow Down", using a Edie Brickell "What I Am" record that Sadat found at the record store and making it into a beat. "Slow Down" and "One for All" were on Billboard's Hot Rap Tracks chart in 1991. Alamo was still performing at shows with Sadat X and Lord Jamar without Puba. In 1991, after the release of One for All, he and Grand Puba left the group to pursue solo careers.

Alamo later teamed up with DJ Stud Doogie for Grand Puba's first solo album, Reel to Reel. He then produced for members of Brand Nubian's solo projects. Two songs, "Playin' the Game" and "Don't Waste My Time", were produced by Alamo on Puba's second album, 2000, in 1995. In 1996, he produced a track called " Open Bar" on Sadat's first solo album, Wild Cowboys. Him and Brand Nubian reunited in 1997 while recording some material for the group's new project. In 1998, he and Grand Puba returned to appear on the group's fourth album, Foundation. He produced three tracks, including "Back Up off the Wall", "Probable Cause" and "I'm Black and I'm Proud".

In 2004, him and Brand Nubian released their fifth studio album, Fire in the Hole on Babygrande Records. He produced two tracks on the album, "Momma" and "Just Don't Learn".

== Personal life ==
Alamo has two sons: Mustafa Jones, who is a basketball player for Central Connecticut State. His other son Elijah Jones, who is a cornerback for the Arizona Cardinals. He is married to his wife, Janine.

== Discography ==
=== With Brand Nubian ===
- One for All (1990)
- Foundation (1998)
- Fire in the Hole (2004)
- Time's Runnin' Out (2007)

=== With Grand Puba ===
- Reel to Reel (1992)
- 2000 (1995)
