= The 5% Album =

Studio album by Lord Jamar
- Released: June 27, 2006
- Recorded: 2005–06
- Studio: 7G Studios
- Genre: Hip hop
- Length: 1:05:59
- Label: Babygrande
- Producers: Chuck Wilson (exec.); Lord Jamar (also exec.); Big Throwback; Bronze Nazareth; Gensu Dean; Preservation; Reality Allah; Young Justice

Lord Jamar chronology
Fire in the Hole (2004)	The 5% Album (2006)	Time's Runnin' Out (2007)

Singles from The 5% Album
- 1. "Deep Space" / "The Streets, The Corner" Released: 2006

Professional ratings
Review scores
Source	Rating
AllHipHop	3.5/5 stars
HipHopDX	3.5/5
PopMatters	7/10
RapReviews	6.5/10

The 5% Album is the debut solo studio album by American rapper and record producer Lord Jamar. It was released on June 27, 2006, via Babygrande Records. Production was handled by DJ Preservation, Gensu Dean, Big Throwback, Bronze Nazareth, Reality Allah, Young Justice, and Jamar himself, who also served as executive producer together with Chuck Wilson. It features guest appearances from 40 Bandits, Horse, Kasim Allah, Popa Wu, Prodigal Sunn, Queen Tahera Earth, Raekwon, Reality Allah, RZA, Young Dirty Bastard, Young Justice, Lord Jamar's son Young Lord, and fellow Brand Nubian members Grand Puba and Sadat X. The album peaked at number 94 on the US Billboard Top R&B/Hip-Hop Albums chart.

The album's title and subject matter are taken from the Nation of Gods and Earths teachings that only five percent of the population is enlightened, good, and willing to help those who are oppressed.

== Track listing ==
No.	Title	Writer(s)	Producer(s)	Length
1.	"Intro"	Lorenzo DeChalus	Lord Jamar	1:23
2.	"Original Man" (featuring Kasim Allah and Raekwon)	L. DeChalus; Marvin Whittle; Corey Woods; Jean Daval	Preservation	5:32
3.	"I.S.L.A.M."	L. DeChalus	Lord Jamar	4:04
4.	"Supreme Mathematics (Born Mix)"	L. DeChalus; Daval	Preservation	3:25
5.	"W-G.O.D. (Skit)"	L. DeChalus; Whittle	Lord Jamar	0:31
6.	"Freedom (Papa Wu) Interlude"	David Turner; Daval	Preservation	1:42
7.	"The Corner, The Streets" (featuring Grand Puba)	L. DeChalus; Maxwell Dixon; Raynold Edward Jenkins	Big Throwback	4:35
8.	"Same Ole Girl" (featuring Prodigal Sunn)	L. DeChalus; Lamar Ruff; Justin Cross	Bronze Nazareth	4:00
9.	"P.S.A. (Skit)"		Lord Jamar	0:50
10.	"Revolution" (featuring Horse and Reality Allah)	L. DeChalus; D. Duncan; E. DeChalus	Reality Allah	3:38
11.	"Deep Space" (featuring RZA)	L. DeChalus; Robert Diggs; Daval	Preservation	4:25
12.	"Young Godz" (featuring Young Justice, Young Dirty Bastard and Young Lord)	Karim Justice Grice; Barson Unique Jones; Young Lord	Young Justice	2:31
13.	"Yakub da Jeweler (Skit)"	L. DeChalus; Whittle	Lord Jamar	0:44
14.	"Advance the Game"	L. DeChalus	Lord Jamar	3:56
15.	"The Cipher" (featuring 40 Bandits)	L. DeChalus; A. Ali-El; A. Bey; J. Glenn; R. Glenn; Eddie Alexander	Gensu Dean	4:18
16.	"The Interview (Skit)"	L. DeChalus; Whittle	Lord Jamar	1:35
17.	"Givin' Up"	L. DeChalus	Lord Jamar	3:11
18.	"Study Ya Lessons" (featuring Queen Tahera Earth and Sadat X)	L. DeChalus; B. Satz; M. Herbert; Derek Murphy; Alexander	Gensu Dean; Lord Jamar	4:08
19.	"Freedom (Papa Wu) (Reprise)"	Turner; Daval	Preservation	1:32
20.	"Greatest Story Never Told"	L. DeChalus; Alexander	Gensu Dean	6:13
21.	"Supreme Mathematics (Knowledge Mix)"	L. DeChalus	Lord Jamar	3:46
Total length:				1:05:59

== Personnel ==
- Lorenzo "Lord Jamar" DeChalus – vocals, producer (tracks: 1, 3, 5, 9, 13, 14, 16–18, 21), executive producer
- Jean "DJ Preservation" Daval – producer (tracks: 2, 4, 6, 11, 19)
- Big Throwback – producer (track 7)
- Justin "Bronze Nazareth" Cross – producer (track 8)
- Reality Allah – producer (track 10)
- Karim "Young Justice" Grice – vocals & producer (track 12)
- Eddie "Gensu Dean" Alexander – producer (tracks: 15, 18, 20)
- Chris Conway – mixing, recording
- Michael Sarsfield – mastering
- Charles "Chuck" Wilson Jr. – executive producer, concept
- Todd DeChalus – photography
- James "Dreddy Kruger" Dockery – A&R
- Jill Shehebar – management
- Jesse Stone – marketing

== Charts ==
Chart (2006)	Peak position
US Top R&B/Hip-Hop Albums (Billboard)	94
