= The State of New York vs. Derek Murphy =

EP by Sadat X
- Released: September 19, 2000
- Recorded: 2000
- Studio: D&D Studios (New York, NY)
- Genre: East Coast hip-hop; jazz rap
- Length: 22:47
- Label: Stimulated Records
- Producer: Dante Ross (exec.); Mark Chen Heu (exec.); Sadat X (exec.); Diamond D; Minnesota; Dart La; A Kid Called Roots

Sadat X chronology
Wild Cowboys (1996)	The State of New York vs. Derek Murphy (2000)	Experience & Education (2005)

Professional ratings
Review scores
Source	Rating
AllMusic	2.5/5 stars
The New Rolling Stone Album Guide	2/5 stars

The State of New York vs. Derek Murphy is the first extended play by American rapper Sadat X. It was recorded in D&D Studios and released on September 19, 2000, via Dante Ross's Stimulated Records in affiliation with Loud Records. Audio production of the album was handled by Diamond D, Minnesota, Dart La, and A Kid Called Roots. It features guest appearances from the Money Boss Players, who are here credited as Hy Tymes. The EP spawned a single "Ka-Ching", which peaked at number 36 on the Hot Rap Songs. It is second solo effort of Brand Nubian's Sadat X, following his 1996's full-length Wild Cowboys LP.

== Track listing ==
No.	Title	Producer(s)	Length
1.	"X-Man" (featuring Diamond D)	Diamond D	3:07
2.	"Low Maintenance, High Wear"	Dart La	3:30
3.	"Ka-Ching" (featuring Hy Tymes)	Minnesota	4:32
4.	"Cock It Back"	A Kid Called Roots	3:56
5.	"If... (It Ain't About Paper)" (featuring Hy Tymes)	Minnesota	4:20
6.	"You Can't Deny"	Diamond D	3:23
Total length:			22:47

== Personnel ==
- Derek Murphy - main artist, executive producer
- Joseph Kirkland - featured artist (track 1), producer (tracks: 1, 6)
- Mark Richardson - featured artist & producer (tracks: 3, 5)
- Eddie Cheeba - featured artist (tracks: 3, 5)
- Sean Hamilton - featured artist (tracks: 3, 5)
- John C. Parker - producer (track 2)
- Patrick Lawrence - producer (track 4)
- Dante Ross - executive producer
- Mark Chen Heu - executive producer
- Joe Quinde - mixing (tracks: 1, 2, 6)
- James Wilson Staub - mixing (track 3)
- CJ Moore - mixing (track 4)
- Leo "Swift" Morris - mixing (track 5)
- Brent Rollins - art direction
- Big Jeff - management

== Singles chart positions ==
Year	Song	Chart position
Year	Song	US Rap
2000	"Ka-Ching"	36
