= Wake Up (Brand Nubian song) =

1990 single by Brand Nubian

Single by Brand Nubian

from the album One for All
- B-side: "Drop the Bomb"
- Released: November 7, 1990
- Genre: Hip-hop
- Length: 4:00 ("Stimulated Dummies Mix"); 5:25 ("Reprise in the Sunshine")
- Label: Elektra
- Songwriters: Maxwell Dixon; Derek Murphy; Lorenzo Dechalus
- Producer: Brand Nubian

Brand Nubian singles chronology
"Feel So Good" (1989)	"Wake Up" (1990)	"Slow Down" (1991)

Music video
- "Wake Up" on YouTube

"Wake Up" is a song by American hip-hop group Brand Nubian, released on November 7, 1990, as the third single from their debut studio album One for All (1990). There are two versions of the song: "Wake Up (Stimulated Dummies Mix)", which is produced by Stimulated Dummies and samples "Tanga Boo Gonk" by The Nite-Liters and "Cissy Strut" by The Meters; and "Wake Up (Reprise in the Sunshine)", which contains samples of "Everybody Loves the Sunshine" by Roy Ayers, "Another Day" by Ray, Goodman & Brown and "Flash Light" by Parliament. The song is performed only by Grand Puba and sees him rapping about the main principles of Five-Percent Nation.

== Critical reception ==
Jonathan Shecter of The Source considered the song a highlight of One for All. Rolling Stone writers Mosi Reeves and Will Dukes both praised the song; Reeves deemed it a "compelling" song regardless of whether the listener agrees with the group's philosophy, writing that "Grand Puba's deft and reasoned flow, and DJ Alamo's smooth, soulful blend of Roy Ayers' 'Everybody Loves the Sunshine' and Ray, Goodman and Brown's 'Another Day' may make it more listenable than it deserves to be." Dukes commented that "'Wake Up (Reprise in the Sunshine)' teaches the uncivilized, while bursting with populist pride."

== Charts ==
Chart (1991)	Peak position
US Hot R&B/Hip-Hop Songs (Billboard)	92
US Hot Rap Songs (Billboard)	5
