= Word Is Bond (song) =

1994 single by Brand Nubian

Single by Brand Nubian

from the album Everything Is Everything
- B-side: "Straight Off Da Head"
- Released: August 18, 1994
- Recorded: 1993–1994
- Genre: East Coast hip hop
- Length: 4:00
- Label: Elektra
- Songwriters: Lorenzo DeChalus; Derrick Murphy; Owen McIntyre; Roger Ball; Malcolm Duncan; James Hamish Stuart; Stephen Ferrone; Alan Gorrie
- Producers: Lord Jamar; Sadat X (co.)

Brand Nubian singles chronology
"Love Me or Leave Me Alone" (1993)	"Word Is Bond" (1994)	"Hold On" (1995)

Music video
- "Word Is Bond" on YouTube

"Word Is Bond" is a song by American hip hop group Brand Nubian and the lead single from their third studio album Everything Is Everything (1994). It contains samples of "I'm The One" by Average White Band and "Shining Star" by Earth, Wind & Fire.

== Critical reception ==
Steve "Flash" Juon of RapReviews gave a positive review, writing "the song couldn't fail. It even offered a surprisingly sober sentiment for what was otherwise a party jam courtesy of Lord Jamar: 'Set to show/everybody in the party that we're nice without sipping on Bacardi.'"

== Charts ==
Chart (1994)	Peak position
US Billboard Hot 100	94
US Hot R&B/Hip-Hop Songs (Billboard)	64
US Hot Rap Songs (Billboard)	11
