= Elijah Jones (American football) =

American football player (born 2000)

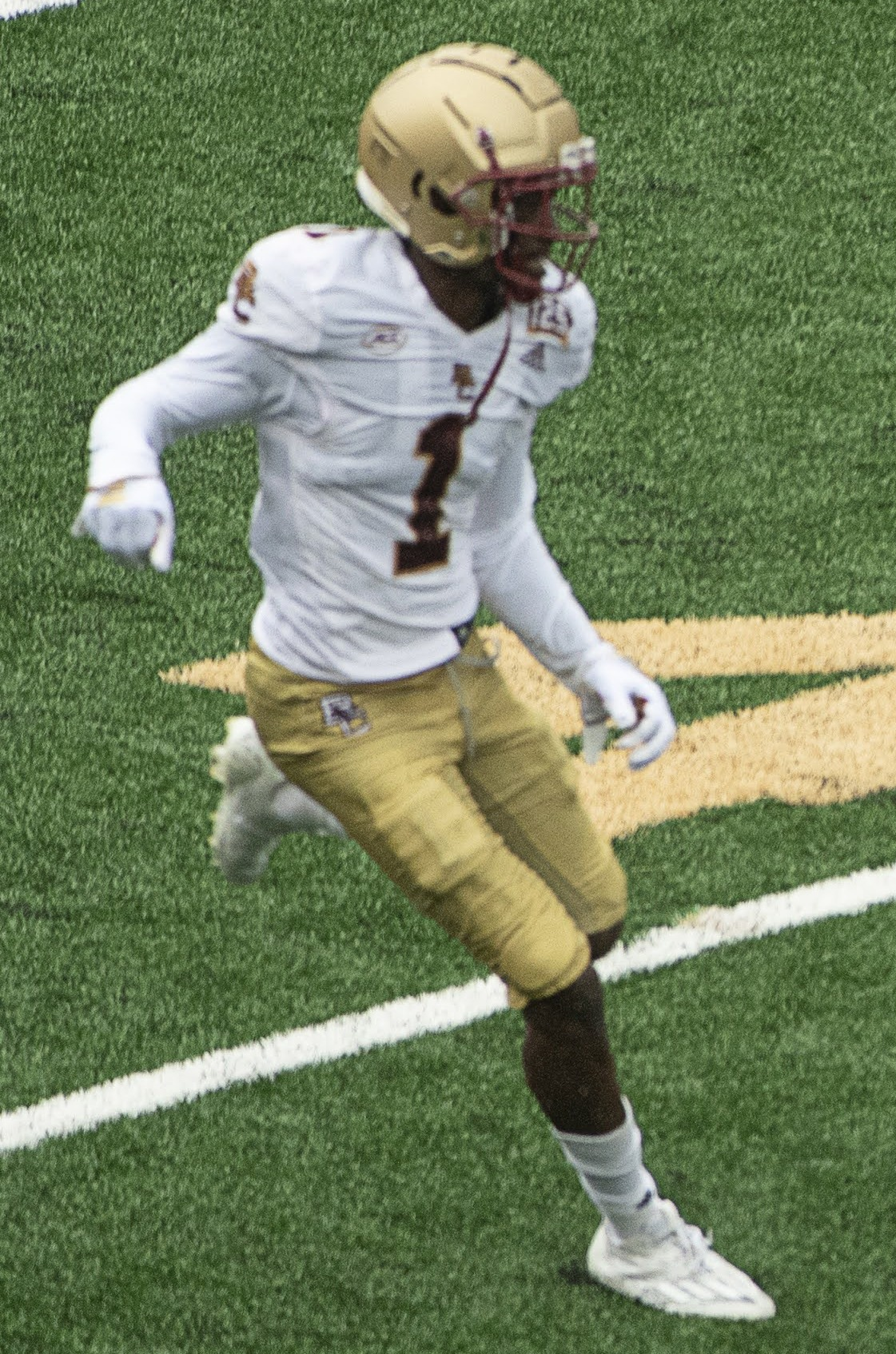
- Jones with the Boston College Eagles in 2023

No. 37 – Chicago Bears
- Position: Cornerback
- Roster status: Practice squad

Personal information
- Born: January 8, 2000 (age 26); Harlem, New York, U.S.
- Listed height: 6 ft 1 in (1.85 m)
- Listed weight: 185 lb (84 kg)

Career information
- High school: Cardinal Hayes (Bronx, New York)
- College: Boston College (2018–2023)
- NFL draft: 2024: 3rd round, 90th overall pick

Career history
- Arizona Cardinals (2024–2025); New York Giants (2026)*; Chicago Bears (2026–present)*
- * Offseason or practice squad member only

Awards and highlights
- First-team All-ACC (2023)

Career NFL statistics as of 2025
- Tackles: 3
- Stats at Pro Football Reference

Elijah Jones (born January 8, 2000) is an American professional football cornerback for the Chicago Bears of the National Football League (NFL). He played college football for the Boston College Eagles and was selected by the Arizona Cardinals in the third round of the 2024 NFL draft.

== Early life ==
Jones was born on January 8, 2000, and grew up in Harlem, New York. His father, Keith, known by the name DJ Alamo, who was a DJ in a critically acclaimed hip hop group Brand Nubian, while his mother, Janine, was the first Black model for L'Oréal. Jones attended Cardinal Hayes High School and was a standout wide receiver and defensive back, being team captain as a senior while totaling 39 receptions for 1,017 yards and 14 touchdowns on offense, along with 22 tackles and three interceptions on defense. He also competed in track and field, setting school records in the 100 metres and 200 metres. Jones was ranked a three-star recruit. He committed to play college football for the Boston College Eagles after having contemplated whether to run track in college.

== College career ==
Jones redshirted as a true freshman at Boston College in 2018 and appeared in four games, totaling six tackles and four passes defended. He then appeared in all 13 games in 2019 and started three, having 27 tackles, one tackle-for-loss (TFL), and a pass breakup. The following year, he posted 36 tackles and five pass breakups for the 2020 NCAA season. He then started 11-of-12 games in 2021 and had 28 tackles, five pass breakups and a forced fumble. He improved in the 2022 season, with 34 tackles, three TFLs, 13 pass deflections and two interceptions, and then returned for the 2023 season and totaled 25 tackles, five interceptions and eight pass breakups. He ended his collegiate career having appeared in 55 games and posted 156 tackles, 36 passes defended and seven interceptions. He was invited to the Hula Bowl and later to the 2024 Senior Bowl. He also participated at the NFL Scouting Combine.

== Professional career ==
Pre-draft measurables
Height	Weight	Arm length	Hand span	Wingspan	40-yard dash	10-yard split	20-yard split	20-yard shuttle	Three-cone drill	Vertical jump	Broad jump
6 ft 1 1/2 in (1.87 m)	185 lb (84 kg)	31 1/2 in (0.80 m)	9 1/4 in (0.23 m)	6 ft 4 in (1.93 m)	4.44 s	1.54 s	2.61 s	4.25 s	7.07 s	42.5 in (1.08 m)	10 ft 11 in (3.33 m)
All values from NFL Combine/Pro Day

=== Arizona Cardinals ===
Jones was selected by the Arizona Cardinals in the third round (90th overall) of the 2024 NFL draft. He was placed on injured reserve on August 29, 2024.

On August 30, 2026, Jones was waived by the Cardinals as a part of final roster cuts.

=== New York Giants ===
On September 1, 2026, Jones was signed to the New York Giants' practice squad. On September 22, he was released by the Giants.

=== Chicago Bears ===
On October 6, 2026, Jones signed with the Chicago Bears practice squad.
