= Punks Jump Up to Get Beat Down =

Single by Brand Nubian

from the album In God We Trust
- Released: August 1992
- Recorded: 1992, Marathon Studios
- Genre: Hip hop
- Length: 4:30
- Label: Elektra
- Songwriters: Derrick Murphy, Lorenzo DeChalus, Joseph Kirkland
- Producer: Diamond D

Brand Nubian singles chronology
"All for One" (1992)	"Punks Jump Up to Get Beat Down" (1992)	"Love Me or Leave Me Alone" (1993)

Music video
- "Punks Jump Up to Get Beat Down" on YouTube

"Punks Jump Up to Get Beat Down" is a song by the American hip hop group Brand Nubian included on their 1993 album In God We Trust. The song was later included on their 2001 greatest hits compilation album, The Very Best of Brand Nubian. The song samples "Gonna Fly Now" by Bill Conti and "It's Your Thing" by Lou Donaldson.

The track created controversy because of its homophobic content such as Sadat X's line "I can freak, fly, flow, fuck up a faggot/I don't understand their ways; I ain't down with gays." Regardless, the single charted on the Billboard Hot 100 at number 77. Later versions omitted the line and replaced it with different lyrics, including the version on The Very Best of Brand Nubian. In addition to the aforementioned use of the word "faggot" in the song, the final verse by Lord Jamar also contains the lyric "Did you want some more? I didn't think so. Just got whipped like a faggot in the clink, so."

"Punks Jump Up to Get Beat Down" contains samples of 3 songs: "It's Your Thing" by Lou Donaldson, "Gonna Fly Now" by Bill Conti, and "What Can You Bring Me?" by Charles Wright & the Watts 103rd Street Rhythm Band.

== Single track listing ==
- 12" single

A-side
No.	Title	Length
1.	"Punks Jump Up to Get Beat Down (Radio Version)"	4:30
2.	"Punks Jump Up to Get Beat Down (Dirty Version)"	4:30
3.	"Punks Jump Up to Get Beat Down (Instrumental version)"	4:30

B-side
No.	Title	Length
1.	"Punks Jump Up to Get Beat Down (Remix)" (Remix - Diamond D)	3:51
2.	"Punks Jump Up to Get Beat Down (Remix Instrumental)" (Remix - Diamond D)	3:51

== Charts ==
Chart (1992–93)	Peak position
U.S. Billboard Hot 100	77
U.S. Billboard Hot R&B Singles	42
U.S. Billboard Bubbling Under Hot 100	3
U.S. Billboard R&B/Hip-Hop Airplay	66
U.S. Billboard Hot Rap Songs	2
