= Hold On (Brand Nubian song) =

1995 single by Brand Nubian

Single by Brand Nubian

from the album Everything Is Everything
- B-side: "Step Into Da Cipher"
- Released: 1995
- Recorded: 1993–1994
- Genre: Conscious hip hop
- Length: 4:15
- Label: Elektra
- Songwriters: Lorenzo DeChalus; Derrick Murphy; Michael Hucknall; Neil Moss
- Producers: Lord Jamar; Sadat X (co.)

Brand Nubian singles chronology
"Word Is Bond" (1994)	"Hold On" (1995)	"A Child is Born" (1997)

Music video
- "Hold On" on YouTube

"Hold On" is a song by American hip hop group Brand Nubian and the second single from their third studio album Everything Is Everything (1994). It features American singer Starr. The song contains samples of "Holding Back the Years" by Simply Red and "Sneakin' in the Back" by Tom Scott and the L.A. Express.

== Composition ==
The song uses the instrumentation and hook from "Holding Back the Years". Lyrically, it revolves around black on black crime and calls for improvement within the Black community. In Sadat X's verse, he depicts a person trying to instigate a fight with him.

== Critical reception ==
Spence D. of IGN commented that the song "masterfully blends Simply Red's 'Holding Back The Years' into a hip-hop smoothie." Steve "Flash" Juon of RapReviews stated that the song "set the bar even HIGHER for the group" and also responded favorably to the sample, praising it for "cleverly borrowing" elements of "Holding Back the Years".

== Charts ==
Chart (1995)	Peak position
US Hot Rap Songs (Billboard)	39
