= All for One (Brand Nubian song) =

1992 single by Brand Nubian

Single by Brand Nubian

from the album One for All
- B-side: "Concerto in X Minor"
- Released: January 1992
- Genre: Hip-hop
- Length: 4:54
- Label: Elektra
- Songwriters: Maxwell Dixon; Derek Murphy; Lorenzo Dechalus
- Producer: Brand Nubian

Brand Nubian singles chronology
| "Slow Down" (1991) | "All for One" (1992) | "Punks Jump Up to Get Beat Down" (1993) |

Music video
- "All for One" on YouTube

"All for One" is a song by American hip hop group Brand Nubian from their debut studio album One for All (1990). It was released as the album's fifth single in January 1992. The song contains samples of "All for One", "Can Mind" and "Funky President" by James Brown, "Tramp" by Lowell Fulson and "Goodbye Love" by Guy.

== Critical reception ==
Jonathan Shecter of The Source considered the song a highlight of One for All, calling it a "funky Nubian's theme song". Rolling Stone Will Dukes commented that Grand Puba "vamps" on the song "like he's a virtuoso jazz trumpeter."

== Charts ==
| Chart (1992) | Peak position |
|---|---|
| US Hot Rap Songs (Billboard) | 17 |
