= Experience and education =

Experience and education may refer to:

- experiential education, a philosophy of education
- Experience and Education (book), by John Dewey the most famous proponent of this philosophy
- Experience & Education, an album by Sadat X
