= The Lump Lump =

1996 single by Sadat X

Single by Sadat X

from the album Wild Cowboys
- Released: October 28, 1996
- Recorded: 1995–1996
- Studio: Chung King Studios (New York, NY); D&D Studios (New York, NY); Chris Biondo Studios (Washington, D.C.); Platinum Island Studios (New York, NY); Greene St. Recording (New York, NY)
- Genre: Hip-hop
- Length: 3:55
- Label: Loud; RCA
- Songwriters: Derek Murphy; Anthony Best
- Producer: Buckwild

Sadat X singles chronology
"Hang 'Em High" (1996)	"The Lump Lump" (1996)	"It Go's Down Ones Again" (1997)

Music video
- "The Lump Lump" on YouTube

"The Lump Lump" is a song by American rapper Sadat X from his debut studio album Wild Cowboys (1996). It was released on October 28, 1996, as the album's second single. Produced by Buckwild, the song contains a sample of "Tell Me" by Groove Theory.

== Critical reception ==
In his review of Wild Cowboys, Matt Jost of RapReviews wrote favorably of Sadat X's use of humor and sarcasm in his lyrics, highlighting his satire towards both men and women on "The Lump Lump" and additionally praising his distinctive "patterns of thought, flow and rhyme".

== Charts ==
Chart (1996)	Peak position
US Hot R&B/Hip-Hop Songs (Billboard)	85
US Hot Rap Songs (Billboard)	20
US Dance Singles Sales (Billboard)	5
