= Hang 'Em High (song) =

1996 single by Sadat X featuring D.V. Alias Khrist

Single by Sadat X featuring D.V. Alias Khrist

from the album Wild Cowboys
- B-side: "Stages & Lights"
- Released: May 20, 1996
- Recorded: 1995–1996
- Studio: Chung King Studios (New York, NY); D&D Studios (New York, NY); Chris Biondo Studios (Washington, D.C.); Platinum Island Studios (New York, NY); Greene St. Recording (New York, NY)
- Genre: Hip-hop
- Length: 4:00
- Label: Loud; RCA
- Songwriters: Derek Murphy; Ali Malek; Joseph Kirkland; Ennio Morricone
- Producer: Malek

Sadat X singles chronology
| "Loud Hangover" (1995) | "Hang 'Em High" (1996) | "The Lump Lump" (1996) |

Music video
- "Hang 'Em High" on YouTube

"Hang 'Em High" is a song by American rapper Sadat X, released on May 20, 1996 as the lead single from his debut studio album Wild Cowboys (1996). It features vocals from American rapper D.V. Alias Khrist. Produced by Ali Malek, the song contains a sample of "The Good, the Bad and the Ugly" by Ennio Morricone. Lyrically, it describes the crime-ridden environment of the New York City streets, while comparing it to the Wild West.

== Critical reception ==
Matt Jost of RapReviews considered the song to feature the best production on Wild Cowboys, writing that Ali Malek "makes the best imaginable use of Ennio Morricone" and "Any other western reference would invariably fail after this ingenious incorporation of 'The Good, the Bad and the Ugly.'" He further remarked, "DV Alias Khrist provides a haunting hook, while X transfers today's 'New York terrority' [sic] to the Old West. As far as rap tracks in a western setting go, 'Hang 'Em High' (accompagnied [sic] by a top-notch video) is only rivaled by Kool Moe Dee's classic 'Wild Wild West.'"

== Charts ==
| Chart (1996) | Peak position |
|---|---|
| US Billboard Hot 100 | 98 |
| US Hot R&B/Hip-Hop Songs (Billboard) | 53 |
| US Hot Rap Songs (Billboard) | 12 |
| US Dance Singles Sales (Billboard) | 21 |
