= DJ Symphony discography =

- Mixtapes: 16

The discography of DJ Symphony, an American hip hop disc jockey, consist of sixteen mixtapes.

== Discography ==
=== Singles ===
- 2019: Anti Mumble Rap (featuring Sadat X & Ceazar)
- 2020: Real Hip-Hop (featuring Jeru the Damaja, Psycho Les & Sadat X)

=== Albums ===
- TBA: It's Bigger Than Music

=== Mixtapes ===
- 2010: Certified Crack: Vial 1 (hosted by Raekwon)
- 2011: Certified Crack: Vial 2 (hosted by Raekwon)
- 2011: Certified Crack: Memorial Weekend (hosted by Raekwon)
- 2011: Messy Sheets
- 2011: Fight For The Carter: Wayne Vs Shawn
- 2012: 365 Takeova Series: 2-10-12 (hosted by DJ Symphony & DJ Dames Nellas)
- 2012: 365 Takeova Series: 3-16-12 (hosted by DJ Symphony & DJ Dames Nellas)
- 2012: I Love Canada
- 2012: Dipset Vs Wu-Tang
- 2012: I Love America
- 2012: Certified Crack: Common Vs Drake
- 2012: I Am Trayvon Martin
- 2012: Certified Crack: Waka Flocka Vs Wiz Khalifa
- 2012: Certified Crack: MMG Vs YMCMB
- 2014: Certified Crack: The Best Of Superwoman (hosted by Lil' Mo)
- 2018: Wu-Invasion Mixtape Series: Australian Edition Volume 1 (hosted by GZA)
- 2018: Wu-Invasion Mixtape Series: World Edition Volume 1 (hosted by Ghostface Killah)
- 2018: Wu-Invasion Mixtape Series: World Edition Volume 2 (hosted by Ghostface Killah)
- 2019: Wu-Invasion Mixtape Series: Valentines Day Massacre (hosted by Ghostface Killah)
- 2020: Classic Throwback Mixtape Series: Volume 1 (hosted by Faizon Love)

=== Guest appearances ===
- 2010: "The Columbian Necktie" Raekwon (hosted by DJ Symphony)
- 2010: "Dead or Alive" The Cartel (hosted by DJ Symphony)
- 2011: "Digital Money" Da Tykoon (hosted by DJ Symphony)
- 2011: "The Vault" Nino Graye (hosted by DJ Symphony)
