= Black, White & Blue =

2018 American documentary film

- Theatrical release poster
- Directed by: Asia Norris
- Produced by: Curtis Scoon; Luc Stephen
- Starring: Charlamagne tha God; Michael Dowd; Karen Dumas; Michael Eric Dyson; Ibrahim Hooper; Killer Mike; Leslie Mathews; Lord Jamar; Honorable William "Billy" Murphy Jr.; Touré; Coleman Young II
- Release dates: January 19, 2018 (Sundance Film Festival); February 2, 2018 (United States)
- Running time: 76 minutes
- Country: United States
- Language: English
- Budget: $175,000

Black, White & Blue is a 2018 American documentary film directed by Asia Norris and produced by Curtis Scoon. The film features Michigan Senator Coleman Young II, television personality Charlamagne tha God, rapper Killer Mike and Lord Jamar from Brand Nubian.

Black, White & Blue premiered at the Sundance Film Festival, on January 19, 2018.

== Synopsis ==
Black, White & Blue contains interviews about the history of race in the United States with African-Americans including: Michigan Senator Coleman Young II, Baltimore Circuit Court Judge William "Billy" Murphy Jr., journalist Touré, author Michael Eric Dyson, Detroit News reporter James David Dickson, activist Ibrahim Hooper, rapper Killer Mike, Lord Jamar from Brand Nubian, former NYPD Officer Michael Dowd.
