= DJ Symphony =

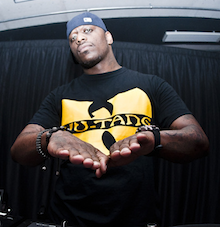

Background information
- Born: August 1, 1976 (age 50)
- Origin: Newark, New Jersey, U.S.
- Genre: Hip-hop
- Occupations: Record producer; DJ; educator
- Instrument: Turntables
- Years active: 1989–present
- Labels: Ice H2O Records, Instant Music Group
- Website: www.djsymphony.com

Symphony Taylor (born August 1, 1976), known professionally as DJ Symphony, is an American hip-hop producer, radio personality, and former DJ for GZA of the Wu-Tang Clan. Symphony has worked with artists such as Digital Underground, Tony Touch, DJ Boogie Blind, DJ Scratch from EPMD, The Beatnuts, Sean Price, P. Diddy, Nas, MF Doom, Alchemists, Mobb Deep, Portia Dee, Rick Ross, KRS-One, 2 Chainz, Busta Rhymes, Snoop Dogg, Yelawolf, Onyx, 9th Wonder, B2K's Raz-B and B-Nasty

== Early life ==
Born and raised in Newark, New Jersey, DJ Symphony started deejaying at age 9 when his older brothers requested him to be the DJ for their rap group New Poet Society. He played local parties in the New Jersey area and was mentored in the craft by the late DJ Kashief, who was also a popular deejay in the New Jersey area at the time. DJ Symphony started making mixtapes by age 12, and used whatever money he made selling mixtapes to help him buy more vinyl records. DJ Symphony began his professional career in 1995 deejaying in nightclubs, restaurants, colleges and block parties in the New Jersey and New York area.

== Career ==
=== Radio ===
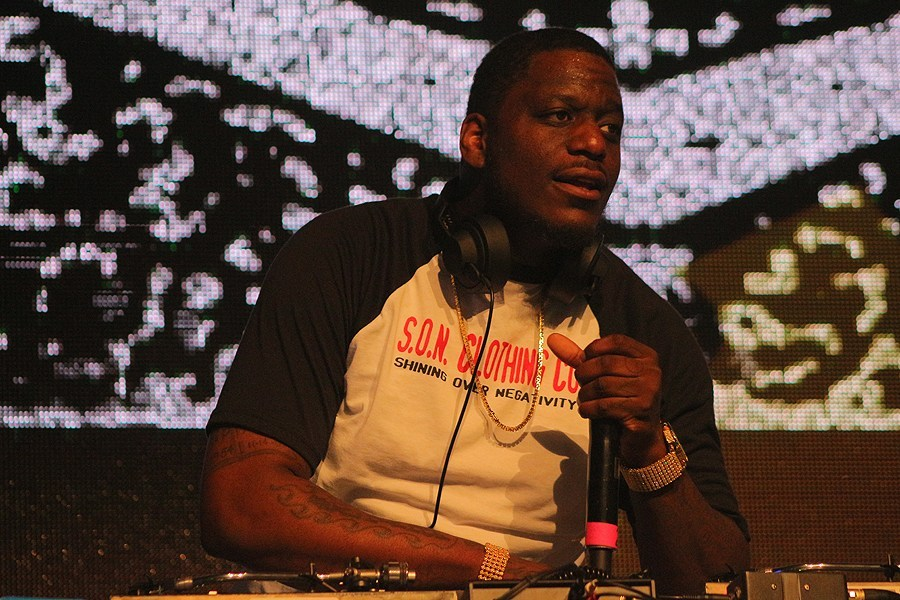
DJ Symphony performing in Chile

DJ Symphony became a radio DJ for 103.3 WPRB in Princeton, New Jersey in 1996 and ran a weekly program called Vibes and Vapours. In 1997, he also started to deejay for Rutgers University and did their Black Madness events. Although DJ Symphony devoted most of his time from 2000 and onward to tour deejaying for numerous artists, he returned to radio in 2007 and worked for 102.5 KSFM in Sacramento, California as a mix show DJ for the show Club 102 which aired from 12am-2am every weekend until 2009. In 2010, DJ Symphony became the program director for Radio Invasion 93.1FM a clear channel radio station.

=== Tour DJ for the Gza of the Wu-Tang Clan ===
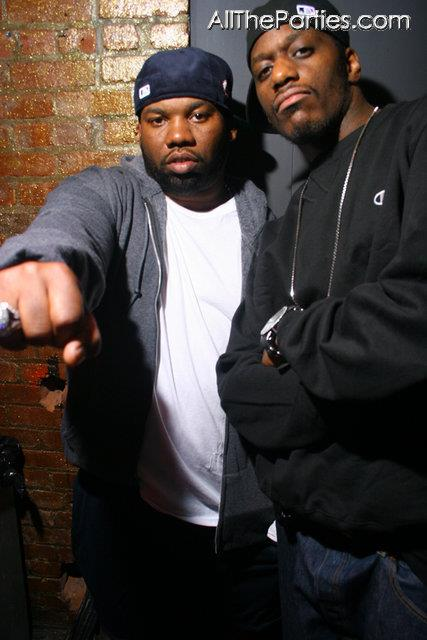
DJ Symphony with Raekwon

In 2000, DJ Symphony was introduced to the Wu-Tang Clan through Raekwon. He started doing shows as Raekwon's tour DJ and in the years to come, he became official tour DJ for Gza of the Wu-Tang Clan, the other DJs being DJ Mathematics, DJ Dice and DJ Saki. DJ Symphony has toured with members of the Wu-Tang Clan on both domestic and international tours. DJ Symphony was the official DJ for Raekwon from 2006 to 2013 and worked with Raekwon's label Ice H2O Records from 2006 to 2010. DJ Symphony also worked with Ghostface Killah on his Wu-Block Tour from 2010 to 2013. Since 2014, DJ Symphony has worked as the official tour DJ for GZA.

== Production credits ==
DJ Symphony started his professional production career in 2006 when he was signed with Raekwon's Ice H2O Records label. The label put out the song "Papito" with JD Era and opened up the door for DJ Symphony to produce for other celebrity artists. Listed below are some of the songs that DJ Symphony has produced, although the list is not exhaustive:

1. All the way good - Capone (CNN)
2. Papito- Ceazar and Reason featuring JD Era
3. Heart of Fire - Raekwon
4. The Rock - Cappadonna
5. Live Your Fantasy - Portia Dee
6. The Water - Hanz On
7. W.A.R - Hanz On
8. Circle Back - B-Nasty
9. Anti Mumble Rap featuring Sadat X & Ceazar
10. Real Hip-Hop - Jeru the Damaja, Psycho Les & Sadat X

== Discography ==
DJ Symphony's most notable mixtape series was created in 2010 The Certified Crack Mixtape Series with Raekwon. Overall, the Certified Crack Mixtape Series has had over 1 million downloads. In total, there are 20 Mixtapes in circulation.

Singles

- 2019: Anti Mumble Rap (featuring Sadat X & Ceazar)
- 2020: Real Hip-Hop (featuring Jeru the Damaja, Psycho Les & Sadat X)

Mixtapes

- 2010: Certified Crack: Vial 1 (hosted by Raekwon)
- 2011: Certified Crack: Vial 2 (hosted by Raekwon)
- 2011: Certified Crack: Memorial Weekend (hosted by Raekwon)
- 2011: Messy Sheets
- 2011: Fight For The Carter: Wayne Vs Shawn
- 2012: 365 Takeova Series: 2-10-12 (hosted by DJ Symphony & DJ Dames Nellas)
- 2012: 365 Takeova Series: 3-16-12 (hosted by DJ Symphony & DJ Dames Nellas)
- 2012: I Love Canada
- 2012: Dipset Vs Wu-Tang
- 2012: I Love America
- 2012: Certified Crack: Common Vs Drake
- 2012: I Am Trayvon Martin
- 2012: Certified Crack: Waka Flocka Vs Wiz Khalifa
- 2012: Certified Crack: MMG Vs YMCMB
- 2014: Certified Crack: The Best Of Superwoman (hosted by Lil' Mo)
- 2018: Wu-Invasion Mixtape Series: Australian Edition Volume 1 (hosted by GZA)
- 2018: Wu-Invasion Mixtape Series: World Edition Volume 1 (hosted by Ghostface Killah)
- 2018: Wu-Invasion Mixtape Series: World Edition Volume 2 (hosted by Ghostface Killah)
- 2019: Wu-Invasion Mixtape Series: Valentines Day Massacre (hosted by Ghostface Killah)
- 2020: Classic Throwback Mixtape Series: Volume 1 (hosted by Faizon Love)

Guest appearances

- 2010: "The Columbian Necktie" Raekwon (hosted by DJ Symphony)
- 2010: "Dead or Alive" The Cartel (hosted by DJ Symphony)
- 2011: "Digital Money" Da Tykoon (hosted by DJ Symphony)
- 2011: "The Vault" Nino Graye (hosted by DJ Symphony)

== Movie scores ==
DJ Symphony helped create the movie score for the film Omerta (2012)
