= Love Me or Leave Me Alone =

1993 single by Brand Nubian

Single by Brand Nubian

from the album In God We Trust
- B-side: "The Travel Jam"
- Released: 1993
- Genre: Hip hop
- Length: 4:35
- Label: Elektra
- Songwriters: Derek Murphy; Lorenzo Dechalus
- Producer: Brand Nubian

Brand Nubian singles chronology
"Allah U Akbar" (1993)	"Love Me or Leave Me Alone" (1993)	"Word Is Bond" (1994)

Music video
- "Love Me or Leave Me Alone" on YouTube

"Love Me or Leave Me Alone" is a song by American hip hop group Brand Nubian and the third single from their second studio album In God We Trust (1993). It contains samples of "San Francisco Lights" by Bobbi Humphrey and Booker T. & the M.G.'s cover of "Sing a Simple Song" by Sly and the Family Stone.

The song has been referenced in films, as well as other hip hop songs such as "Public Service Announcement" by Jay-Z.

== Critical reception ==
In his review of In God We Trust for Entertainment Weekly, James Bernard perceived the song as lacking humor, commenting "Even the band's attempt at a love song, 'Love Me or Leave Me Alone,' fails to introduce us to the men behind the mikes." Steve "Flash" Juon of RapReviews regarded the song as misogynistic to some people, while acknowledging that Lord Jamar details his Muslim practices in his verse, writing "Now he probably doesn't need to call a woman a 'hoe' to make the point that he wants a mate whose beliefs adhere to his own, but you can also understand him wanting a partner who is not going to eat bacon, pork chops or ham sandwiches." Jaffe Lloyd of HotNewHipHop included the song in his list "Best Hip-Hop Break Up Tracks".

== Charts ==
Chart (1993)	Peak position
US Billboard Hot 100	92
US Hot R&B/Hip-Hop Songs (Billboard)	68
US Hot Rap Songs (Billboard)	13
