= Wild Cowboys =

1996 album by Sadat X

Studio album by Sadat X
- Released: July 15, 1996
- Recorded: 1995–96
- Studio: Chung King Studios (New York, NY); D&D Studios (New York, NY); Chris Biondo Studios (Washington, D.C.); Platinum Island Studios (New York, NY); Greene St. Recording (New York, NY)
- Genre: Hip-hop
- Length: 1:04:01
- Label: Loud; RCA
- Producer: Matt Life (exec.); Schott Free (exec.); Dante Ross (also exec.); Sadat X (also exec.); Ali Malek; Ant Greene Father Time; Buckwild; Da Beatminerz; Diamond D; DJ Alamo; DJ Ogee; Minnesota; Pete Rock; Showbiz

Sadat X chronology
Wild Cowboys (1996)	The State of New York vs. Derek Murphy (2000)

Singles from Wild Cowboys
- 1. "Hang 'Em High" Released: May 20, 1996; 2. "The Lump Lump" Released: October 28, 1996

Wild Cowboys is the debut solo studio album by American rapper Sadat X of Brand Nubian. It was released on July 15, 1996, via Loud Records. The recording sessions took place at Chung King Studios, D&D Studios, Platinum Island Studios and Greene St. Recording in New York, and at Chris Biondo Studios in Washington, D.C. It was produced by Sadat, Diamond D, Buckwild, DJ Ogee, Ali Malek, Ant Greene Father Time, Da Beatminerz, Dante Ross, DJ Alamo, Minnesota, Pete Rock, and Showbiz. It features guest appearances from Shawn Black, DV Alias Khrist, Deda, Grand Puba, Kool Chuck, Money Boss Players, Tec, Sha Sha and Regina Hall. The album peaked at number 83 on the Billboard 200 and number 13 on the Top R&B/Hip-Hop Albums chart.

Wild Cowboys spawned two singles: "Hang 'Em High" b/w "Stages & Lights", which made it to No. 98 on the Billboard Hot 100, and "The Lump Lump", which reached No. 85 on the Hot R&B/Hip-Hop Songs chart and No. 20 on the Hot Rap Songs chart.

A sequel to the album, Wild Cowboys II, was released on March 23, 2010.

== Critical reception ==
Professional ratings
Review scores
Source	Rating
AllMusic	3/5 stars
Muzik	3.5/5 stars
RapReviews	8.5/10
(The New) Rolling Stone Album Guide	3/5 stars

The Sun Sentinel noted that "the lean arrangements sometimes taper off to nothingness, and the songs tend to run the usual rap gamut from B to C (smokin' blunts, drinkin' Colt 45)."

== Track listing ==
No.	Title	Writer(s)	Producer(s)	Length
1.	"The Lump Lump"	Derek Murphy; Anthony Best	Buckwild	3:55
2.	"Wild Cowboys"	Murphy; Joseph Kirkland	Diamond D	4:38
3.	"Sauce for Birdheads" (featuring Shawn Black)	Murphy; Shawn Hector; Gary S. Scott	DJ Ogee	4:03
4.	"Open Bar" (featuring Grand Puba)	Murphy; Maxwell Dixon; Keith Jones; Bronisław Kaper; Paul Francis Webster	DJ Alamo	4:35
5.	"Hang 'Em High" (featuring D.V. Alias Khrist)	Murphy; Ali Malek; Kirkland; Ennio Morricone	Ali Malek	4:00
6.	"Do It Again"	Murphy; Mark Richardson	Minnesota	4:02
7.	"Game's Sober" (featuring Money Boss Players and Sha Sha)	Murphy; Hector; Sean Hamiltion; Eddie Faison; Basil Tweedy; Harkiem Hollis; Allan Hendrix; Richardson; J.A. Greene; A. Glenn	Ant Greene Father Time	4:39
8.	"Smoking on the Low" (featuring D.V. Alias Khrist and Shawn Black)	Murphy; Hector; Best	Buckwild	4:42
9.	"Petty People" (featuring Shawn Black)	Murphy; Hector; Kirkland	Diamond D	4:26
10.	"The Interview" (featuring Regina Hall)	Murphy; Walter Dewgarde; Ewart Dewgarde	Da Beatminerz	3:32
11.	"Stages and Lights"	Murphy; Rodney Lemay	Showbiz	4:15
12.	"Move On"	Murphy; Kirkland	Diamond D	4:25
13.	"The Funkiest"	Murphy; Minnie Riperton; Richard Rudolph	Dante Ross; Sadat X	4:10
14.	"Escape from New York" (featuring Deda)	Murphy; Peter Phillips	Pete Rock	4:10
15.	"The Hashout" (featuring Kool Chuck, Shawn Black and Tec)	Murphy; Hector; Scott	DJ Ogee	4:28
Total length:				1:04:01

Sample credits

- Track 1 contains samples from "Tell Me" written by Bryce Wilson and Amel Larrieux and performed by Groove Theory
- Track 4 contains samples from "Invitation" written by Bronisław Kaper and Paul Francis Webster and performed by Cal Tjader
- Track 5 embodies portions of "The Good, the Bad and the Ugly" written by Ennio Morricone
- Track 7 contains samples from "Standing Right Here" written by Gene McFadden, John Whitehead and Victor Carstarphen and performed by Melba Moore
- Track 13 contains excerpts from "Lovin' You" performed by Minnie Ripperton

== Personnel ==
- Derek "Sadat X" Murphy – main artist, producer (track 13), executive producer, sleeve notes
- Shawn "Shawn Black" Hector – featured artist (tracks: 3, 8, 9, 15)
- Maxwell "Grand Puba" Dixon – featured artist (track 4)
- Kenneth "DV Alias Khtist" Scranton – featured artist (tracks: 5, 8)
- Eddie "Eddie Cheeba" Faison – featured artist (track 7)
- Sean "Lord Tariq" Hamilton – featured artist (track 7)
- Mark "Minnesota" Richardson – featured artist (track 7), producer (track 6)
- Sha Sha – vocals (track 7)
- Regina Hall – featured artist (track 10)
- Sylvester "Deda" James – featured artist (track 14)
- Kool Chuck – featured artist (track 15)
- Tec – featured artist (track 15)
- Anthony "Roc Raida" Williams – scratches (track 1)
- Anthony "Tone The Backbone" Scott – bass (track 10)
- Tim Latham – mixing (track 1)
- John Wydrycs – recording (track 1)
- Gordon "Commissioner Gordon" Williams – mixing (tracks: 2, 11, 13), recording (tracks: 2, 13)
- Tony Smalios – mixing (tracks: 3–5, 8–9, 15)
- Chris Conway – recording (tracks: 3, 11, 15)
- Jack Hersca – recording (tracks: 4, 9, 12), mixing (track 12)
- Chris Biondo – recording (track 5)
- Troy Hightower – mixing (tracks: 6, 7)
- Ken "Duro" Ifill – recording (tracks: 6, 7)
- Mario Rodriguez – recording (track 8)
- Leo "Swift" Morris – mixing & recording (track 10)
- James Wilson Staub – mixing & recording (track 14)
- Tom Coyne – mastering
- Anthony "Buckwild" Best – producer (tracks: 1, 8)
- Joseph "Diamond D" Kirkland – producer (tracks: 2, 9, 12), additional programming (track 5)
- Gary "DJ Ogee" Scott – producer (tracks: 3, 15)
- Keith "Alamo" Jones – producer (track 4)
- Ali Malek – producer (track 5)
- Ant Greene Father Time – producer (track 7)
- Ewart "DJ Evil Dee" Dewgarde – producer (track 10)
- Walter "Mr. Walt" Dewgarde – producer (track 10)
- Rodney "Showbiz" LeMay – producer (track 11)
- Dante Ross – producer (track 13), executive producer, management
- Peter "Pete Rock" Phillips – producer (track 14)
- Matteo "Matt Life" Glen – executive producer, A&R
- Schott "Schott Free" Jacobs – executive producer, A&R
- Ola Kudu – art direction, design
- Danny Clinch – photography

== Charts ==
Chart (1996)	Peak position
US Billboard 200	83
US Top R&B/Hip-Hop Albums (Billboard)	13

=== Singles chart positions ===
Year	Song	Chart positions			
Year	Song	US Hot 100	US R&B	US Rap	US Dance
1996	"Hang 'Em High"	98	53	12	21
1996	"The Lump Lump"	—	85	20	5
