= Mya Baker =

American film director

- Born: Chicago, Illinois
- Education: Columbia College of Chicago, Illinois
- Children: 1

Mya Baker (aka Mya B.; born 1974) is an American filmmaker, poet, writer, director and researcher. She was born and raised in Chicago, Illinois, and has lived and taught early childhood education in Brooklyn, New York. Lived in Los Angeles for eight years

== Biography ==
Baker was born and raised in Chicago, Illinois, to an electrical engineer father and mother who worked for the EPA. She grew up around positive Black male and female role models, but also experienced racism while growing up. She said in an interview: "I remember so clearly, when I was 5 years old, my mother, my brother and I were chased out of a Chicago neighborhood called Bridgeport when we were young. A gang of boys was waiting for us as we walked out of this church, and they started chasing us with bats and bricks, yelling, 'Nigger go home!

Baker studied film at Columbia College in Chicago, Illinois, and later founded production company Shoot Films Not People. Her films have been shown at film festivals. She has also worked as a Special Education preschool teacher in Brooklyn, New York. Baker stated in an article on Patch.com that she creates films to begin the healing process for Black men and women, and for society. Two of her films- Afraid of Dark and Silence: In Search of Black Female Sexuality in America- have focused on undoing stereotypes of Black men and women.

Baker is best known for Silence: In Search of Black Female Sexuality in America. In this film, she interviewed Nzingha Steward and Little X, two directors in the Black music video industry. During the interview, they discuss the impact of the 'video hoe' image on society. The film takes a journey into American history and slavery that unveils hidden sexual relations between enslaved Africans and slave owners. The film educates the public about the historical and contemporary racial tensions and injustices in America regarding to Black males. Baker shares her experiences and interviews Black men from all walks of life spanning three generations.

== Filmography ==
- 1994 - Warrior Queens - Baker's first documentary short which was shown at the Dusable Museum of African American History in Chicago.
- 2004 - Silence: In search of Black Female Sexuality in America; with interviews with Nzingha Stewart, Dr. Hilda Hutcherson, Dr. Lliala Afrika, Little X, Professor Trisha Rose, Punany Poets, Rev. Jeremiah Wright. In this film she explores past and present sexual myths about Black women. Segments of the film were shown on VH1's “Can’t Get a Date”, in 2006.
- 2010 - Maya Illusion is a short film starring Angelo Boyke and Sophia Loren Coffee; Directed by Mya Baker and Co-Directed by Amy Werber. This film short is an about a young woman who falls in love with a pretty face to find out later that the pretty face has HIV.
- 2014 Afraid of Dark. This film confronts negative stereotypes of Black males with interviews with rappers, actors, and politicians that talk about their experiences with racism and injustices. In the film are interviews with Lou Myers, Malik Yoba, Sadat X, Sam Greenlee, Tom Burrell, Vondie Curtis Hall, Cornel West, Khalil G. Muhammad, General Steele, Kenya K. Stevens, and Kevin Powell.
- 2024 Finals First short film written, produced, and directed by Mya Baker. Finals is a short film written and directed by Mya Baker about a bullied teenager who leaves a lasting impression on their high school peers on the last day of finals. The film stars Nathan Kendall, Benjamin Chapman, Michele Panu, Kelly Pantaleoni, and Shanequa Reed.

== Honors ==
- 2004 - Telly Award for her documentary Silence: In Search of Black Female Sexuality in America
- 2006 - BET finalist in the Rap It-Up Competition
- 2018- Screencraft Horror Competition, Semifinalist
- 2019 - Screencraft Screenwriting Fellowship, Semifinalist
- 2018 - Script Pipeline Screenplay Competition, Semifinalist
- 2020 - Filmmatic Horror Screenplay Awards (Season 4), Finalist
- 2022 Quarterfinalist, Emerging Screenwriters Screenplay Competition
- Quarterfinalist, Filmmatic TV Pilot Awards Season 7
- Semifinalist, Filmmatic TV Pilot Awards Season 5
- Quarterfinalist, Filmmatic Short Screenplay Awards Season 9
- 2023 Honorable Mention, Big Apple Film Festival Screenplay Competition Fall
- 2024 Top 25 Semifinalist, Roadmap Writers Shorts Competition
