= In God We Trust (Brand Nubian album) =

Studio album by Brand Nubian
- Released: February 2, 1993
- Recorded: 1991–1992
- Studio: Chung King House Of Metal; The Hit Factory; Soundtrack Studios; Marathon Studios
- Genre: Hip-hop
- Length: 55:32
- Label: Elektra
- Producer: Brand Nubian; Diamond D; Rafeal; Sting International

Brand Nubian chronology
One for All (1990)	In God We Trust (1993)	Everything Is Everything (1994)

Singles from In God We Trust
- 1. "Punks Jump Up to Get Beat Down" Released: August 1992; 2. "Allah U Akbar" Released: 1993; 3. "Love Me or Leave Me Alone" Released: 1993

Professional ratings
Review scores
Source	Rating
AllMusic	4/5 stars
Entertainment Weekly	B
RapReviews	8/10
The New Rolling Stone Album Guide	3/5 stars
The Source	4/5 stars
The Village Voice	(dud)

In God We Trust is the second studio album by American hip-hop group Brand Nubian. It was released on February 2, 1993, via Elektra Records. Recording sessions took place at Chung King House Of Metal, The Hit Factory, Soundtrack Studios and Marathon Studios. Production was handled by Brand Nubian, Diamond D, Rafeal and Sting International, with Dante Ross serving as executive producer. It features a lone guest appearance from Red Fox.

In the United States, the album debuted at number 12 on the Billboard 200 and number 4 on the Top R&B/Hip-Hop Albums charts. Three singles were released from the album: "Punks Jump Up to Get Beat Down", "Allah U Akbar" and "Love Me or Leave Me Alone". "Punks Jump Up to Get Beat Down" and "Love Me or Leave Me Alone" reached the US Billboard Hot 100 chart, peaking at number 77 and 92, respectively.

== Background ==
Lead MC Grand Puba parted ways with the group to pursue a solo career in 1991, following the release of their revered debut One for All leaving Sadat X and Lord Jamar, who enlisted DJ Sincere to join the group. Lyrically, the album contains extremely militant content that reflects the group's identity as Five Percenters, adhering to the philosophy of the Nation of Gods and Earths.

The album was almost entirely produced by Lord Jamar utilizing the Akai MPC, giving the album's taste of hardcore hard-hitting intense beats with soul and jazz samples that he found through Sadat's father record collection.

== Critical reception ==
The album was less successful than the group's debut but still received strong reviews. Its lead single "Punks Jump Up to Get Beat Down" was met with controversy over homophobic content, referencing the Sadat X line "Though I can freak, fly, flow, fuck up a faggot/I don't understand their ways, I ain't down with gays". Music critic Robert Christgau gave the album a "dud" rating, indicating "a bad record whose details rarely merit further thought".

== Track listing ==
All tracks are written by Derek Murphy and Lorenzo Dechalus, except track 6 is written by Perry Murphy Dechalus.

No.	Title	Producer(s)	Length
1.	"Allah U Akbar"	Brand Nubian	4:50
2.	"Ain't No Mystery"	Brand Nubian	4:23
3.	"Meaning of the 5%"	Brand Nubian	2:53
4.	"Pass the Gat"	Brand Nubian	3:23
5.	"Black Star Line" (featuring Red Foxx)	Brand Nubian; Rafeal; Sting Int'l	5:07
6.	"Allah and Justice"	Brand Nubian	2:11
7.	"The Godz..."	Brand Nubian	3:50
8.	"The Travel Jam"	Brand Nubian	3:53
9.	"Brand Nubian Rock the Set"	Brand Nubian	4:07
10.	"Love Me or Leave Me Alone"	Brand Nubian	4:35
11.	"Steal Ya 'Ho"	Brand Nubian	3:51
12.	"Steady Bootleggin'"	Brand Nubian	3:52
13.	"Black and Blue"	Brand Nubian	4:01
14.	"Punks Jump Up to Get Beat Down"	Diamond D	4:25
Total length:			55:32

Sample credits

- Track 2 contains elements from "Something You Got" written by Chris Kenner and performed by Wilson Pickett.
- Track 6 contains elements from "Look at Granny Run Run" written by Mortimer Shuman and Jordan Ragovoy and performed by Howard Tate.
- Track 10 contains elements from "San Francisco Lights" written by Chuck Davis and performed by Bobbi Humphrey.
- Track 12 contains elements from "People Sure Act Funny" written by Titus Turner and Bobby Robinson and performed by Dr. Lonnie Smith.
- Track 14 contains elements from "It's Your Thing" written by Rudolph Isley, Ronald Isley and O'Kelly Isley Jr. and performed by Lou Donaldson.

== Charts ==
=== Weekly charts ===
Chart (1993)	Peak position
US Billboard 200	12
US Top R&B/Hip-Hop Albums (Billboard)	4

=== Year-end charts ===
Chart (1993)	Position
US Top R&B/Hip-Hop Albums (Billboard)	71
