= Experience & Education =

Studio album by Sadat X
- Released: October 25, 2005
- Recorded: 2005
- Studio: Thingamajig Lab (Brooklyn, NY)
- Genre: Hip-hop
- Length: 55:31
- Label: Female Fun Music
- Producer: A Kid Called Roots; Ben Gebhardt; Diamond D; DJ Spinna; Ge-ology; Kleph Dollaz; Madsol-Desar; Minnesota; P Brothers; Sha Boogie; Vin The Chin

Sadat X chronology
The State of New York vs. Derek Murphy (2000)	Experience & Education (2005)	Black October (2006)

Professional ratings
Review scores
Source	Rating
AllHipHop	3.5/5 stars
Prefix	7/10
RapReviews	7.5/10

Experience & Education is the second full-length solo studio album by American rapper Sadat X. It was released on October 25, 2005, through Female Fun Music. Recording sessions took place at the Thingamajig Lab in Brooklyn. Production was handled by the P Brothers, Kleph Dollaz, A Kid Called Roots, Ben Gebhardt, Diamond D, DJ Spinna, Ge-ology, Madsol-Desar, Minnesota, Sha Boogie and Vin The Chin. It features guest appearances from Agallah, Gina Vegas, Money Boss Players, Ed O.G. and Heltah Skeltah. The album's lead single was "What Did I Do?" b/w "The Great Diamond D".

== Track listing ==
No.	Title	Writer(s)	Producer(s)	Length
1.	"God Is Back"	Derek Murphy	DJ Spinna	4:50
2.	"What Did I Do?"	Murphy	Kleph Dollaz	4:05
3.	"The Daily News"	Murphy	Kleph Dollaz	3:58
4.	"Back to New York" (featuring Agallah)	Murphy; Angel Aguilar	Vin The Chin	3:56
5.	"Come on Down (Remix)" (featuring Money Boss Players)	Murphy; Paul Littlefair; Paul Spence	P Brothers	4:12
6.	"The Great Diamond D" (featuring Heltah Skeltah)	Murphy; Joseph Kirkland	Diamond D	3:26
7.	"Interlude"		Ben Gebhardt	0:46
8.	"(Experience) Why Don't You" (featuring Edo G.)	Murphy; Edward Anderson	Madsol-Desar	4:16
9.	"Help Yourself"	Murphy	Kleph Dollaz	3:50
10.	"Have a Good Life"	Murphy	Sha Boogie	4:05
11.	"Creep" (featuring Gina Vegas)	Murphy; Patrick Lawrence	A Kid Called Roots	2:56
12.	"Ge-Ology Beat" (featuring Gina Vegas)	Murphy; Gina Vegas	Ge-ology	3:49
13.	"Shout" (featuring Agallah)	Murphy; Aguilar; Littlefair; Spence	P Brothers	2:57
14.	"Stack Up" (featuring Agallah)	Murphy; Aguilar; Littlefair; Spence	P Brothers	2:24
15.	"Shine" (featuring Money Boss Players)	Murphy	Minnesota	5:00
16.	"Outro (NY Fanfare)"	Murphy; Littlefair; Spence	P Brothers	1:01
Total length:				55:31

== Personnel ==
- Derek "Sadat X" Murphy – vocals, executive producer, sleeve notes
- Angel "8-Off Agallah" Aguilar – vocals (tracks: 4, 13, 14)
- Eddie "Cheeba" Faison – vocals (tracks: 5, 15)
- G.S. – vocals (track 5)
- Jahmal "Rock" Bush – vocals (track 6)
- Sean Price – vocals (track 6)
- Edward "Edo G" Anderson – vocals (track 8)
- Gina Vegas – vocals (tracks: 11, 12)
- Vincent "DJ Spinna" Williams – producer (track 1)
- Darrell "Kleph Dollaz" Durant – producer (tracks: 2, 3, 9)
- Vin "The Chin" Mostacciuolo – producer (track 4)
- Paul Littlefair – producer (tracks: 5, 13, 14, 16)
- Paul Spence – producer (tracks: 5, 13, 14, 16)
- Joseph "Diamond D" Kirkland – producer (track 6)
- Ben Gebhardt – producer (track 7)
- Fresnel Madsol Desar Cleophat – producer (track 8), co-executive producer
- Sha Boogie – producer (track 10)
- Patrick "A Kid Called Roots" Lawrence – producer (track 11)
- Gerard "Ge-ology" Young – producer (track 12)
- Mark "Minnesota" Richardson – producer (track 15)
- Dan "The Man" Humiston – mixing
- Peter Agoston – executive producer, sleeve notes
- Ray Johnson – artwork, layout
- Mike "Steady" Adasko – product management
- Barry Heyman – legal
- Jennifer Justice – legal
