= Black October (album) =

Studio album by Sadat X
- Released: October 3, 2006
- Studio: The Thingamajig Lab (Brooklyn); Rum Blanc Recordings LLC; The Dojo (Brooklyn); Hills Have Eyes Studio; Clutch Recordings; The Dewgarde Crib Of Hits (New York)
- Genre: Hip-hop
- Length: 64:36
- Label: Riverside Drive Records
- Producer: Peter Agoston (exec.); Ayatollah; Da Beatminerz; Diamond D; DJ Spinna; Gensu Dean; Greg Nice; J-Zone; Marco Polo; paWL; Scotty Blanco; Spencer Doran; The Asmatik; Vin The Chin

Sadat X chronology
Experience & Education (2005)	Black October (2006)	Generation X (2008)

Professional ratings
Review scores
Source	Rating
AllMusic	3.5/5 stars
Cokemachineglow	70%/100%
HipHopDX	3.5/5
Now	4/5
RapReviews	7.5/10

Black October is the third solo studio album by American rapper Sadat X. It was released on October 3, 2006 through Riverside Drive Records. Recording sessions took place at The Thingamajig Lab, The Dojo and The Dewgarde Crib Of Hits in New York, at Rum Blanc Recordings LLC, at Hills Have Eyes Studio, and at Clutch Recordings. Production was handled by Scotty Blanco, Ayatollah, Da Beatminerz, Diamond D, DJ Pawl, DJ Spinna, Gensu Dean, Greg Nice, J-Zone, Marco Polo, Spencer Doran, The Asmatik and Vin The Chin, with Peter Agoston serving as executive producer. It features guest appearances from Big Meg, Boss Money Gangstas, Brand Nubian, Greg Nice and Tommy Gibbs.

== Track listing ==
No.	Title	Producer(s)	Length
1.	"Black October"	DJ Spinna	4:37
2.	"Throw tha Ball"	Ayatollah	3:44
3.	"The Post"	Diamond D	3:31
4.	"If You" (featuring Boss Money Gangstas, Big Meg, and Tommy Gibbs)	Marco Polo	4:41
5.	"Million Dolla Deal"	Scotty Blanco	3:56
6.	"X Is a Machine"	J-Zone	3:25
7.	"Interlude"	Spencer Doran	1:19
8.	"Eternally Yours"	The Asmatik	4:12
9.	"Untraceable"	Scotty Blanco	3:27
10.	"My Mind" (featuring Greg Nice)	Greg Nice	3:44
11.	"Chosen Few" (performed by Brand Nubian)	Gensu Dean	4:48
12.	"On tha Come Thru"	Da Beatminerz	3:49
13.	"Who"	paWL	4:03
14.	"Momentary Outro"		4:05
15.	"God Is Back (Spencer Doran Remix)" (CD only hidden bonus track)	Spencer Doran	5:41
16.	"Why" (CD only hidden bonus track)	Vin The Chin	3:43
Total length:			1:04:36

== Personnel ==
- Derek "Sadat X" Murphy – vocals
- Eddie "Cheeba" Faison – vocals (track 4)
- MC Tray Bag – vocals (track 4)
- Big Meg – vocals (track 4)
- Y. "Tommy Gibbs" Prince – vocals (track 4)
- Gregory "Greg Nice" Mays – vocals & producer (track 10)
- Maxwell "Grand Puba" Dixon – vocals (track 11)
- Lorenzo "Lord Jamar" Dechalus – vocals (track 11)
- Vincent "DJ Spinna" Williams – scratches & producer (track 1)
- Lamont "Ayatollah" Dorrell – producer (track 2)
- Joe "Diamond D" Kirkland – producer (track 3)
- Marco Bruno – producer (track 4)
- Scotty Blanco – producer (tracks: 5, 9), recording
- Jay "J-Zone" Mumford – scratches & producer (track 6)
- Spencer Doran – scratches & producer (track 7), remixing (track 15)
- The Asmatik – producer (track 8)
- Eddie "Gensu Dean" Alexander – producer (track 11)
- Walter V. "Mr. Walt" Dewgarde, Jr. – producer (track 12)
- Ewart C. "DJ Evil Dee" Dewgarde – producer (track 12)
- Paul "DJ paWL" Iannacchino – producer (track 13)
- Vin Mostacciuolo – producer (track 16)
- Pablo Martin – mastering
- Peter Agoston – executive producer
- Charles Tremblay – project coordinator
- Jon Gray – project coordinator
- Kevin Shand – project coordinator
- Antonio Depietro – design, layout
- Oliver Bernardt – photography
