= Stimulated Records =

Stimulated Records was founded by Dante Ross, an A&R representative and record producer, who was mentioned by De La Soul on its first album, and was the original architect of Elektra Records' hip hop roster of the early to mid 1990s. The label released the likes of Sadat X, Camp Lo, and Cella Dwellas. In 2023, Ross partnered with Roc Nation's distribution company Equity Distribution to relaunch Stimulated Music.

== Discography ==
- Missin' Linx - Exhibit A (12")
- Missin' Linx - Exhibit A (CD)
- Mr. Voodoo - Crhyme Life / Lyrical Tactics, Pt. 2 (12")
- Sadat X - Ka-Ching / X-Man (12")
- Cella Dwellas - Leakage / Ill Collabo (12")
- Stimulated Dummies - Stimulated All Stars / Del Meets The Dummies (12")
- Cella Dwellas - The Last Shall Be First (2xLP)
- Cella Dwellas - The Last Shall Be First (CD, Album)
- Sadat X - The State Of New York vs. Derek Murphy (12")
- Missin' Linx - Family Ties (12")
- Camp Lo - Troubleman / Cookers (12")
- Casual - VIP / I Gotta (Get Down) / Turf Dirt (12")
- Various Artists - Stimulated Vol. 1 (2xLP)
- Sadat X - Cock It Back / You Can't Deny (12", Promo)
- Camp Lo - Troubleman / Cookers (12", Promo)
- Various Artists - Stimulated Vol. 1 - Clean Album (2xLP)
- Sadat X - The State Of New York vs. Derek Murphy (CD, EP)
- DJ Riz - Live From Brooklyn (12")
- Cella Dwellas - Launch A Rocket / Stand Up
