= Everything Is Everything (Brand Nubian album) =

Studio album by Brand Nubian
- Released: November 1, 1994
- Recorded: 1993–1994
- Studio: D&D Studios (New York, NY); Chung King Studios (New York, NY); Soundtrack Studios (New York, NY); Duplex Sound (New York, NY); House Of Hits (Chestnut Ridge, NY); East Hill Studios (New York, NY)
- Genre: Hip-hop
- Length: 1:02:06
- Label: Elektra (61682)
- Producer: Buckwild; Lord Jamar

Brand Nubian chronology
In God We Trust (1993)	Everything Is Everything (1994)	Foundation (1998)

Singles from Everything Is Everything
- 1. "Word Is Bond" Released: August 18, 1994; 2. "Hold On" Released: 1995

Professional ratings
Review scores
Source	Rating
AllMusic	3/5 stars
Christgau's Consumer Guide: Albums of the '90s	(neither)
IGN	7.9/10
Los Angeles Times	2.5/4 stars
Rap Pages	7/10
RapReviews	5.5/10
The New Rolling Stone Album Guide	3/5 stars
The Source	4/5 stars
Tom Hull	B

Everything Is Everything is the third studio album by American hip-hop group Brand Nubian. It was released on November 1, 1994 via Elektra Records. Recording sessions took place at D&D Studios, Chung King Studios, Soundtrack Studios, DuPlex Sound Studios and East Hill Studios in New York and House Of Hits in Chestnut Ridge. Production was handled by Lord Jamar and Buckwild, with co-producer Sadat X. It features guest appearances from Busta Rhymes, Laura Alfored, Maestro Manny, Serge, Snagglepuss and Starr.

The album peaked at number 54 on the Billboard 200 and number 13 on the Top R&B/Hip-Hop Albums charts in the United States. Its lead single, "Word Is Bond", made it to number 94 on the Billboard Hot 100, number 64 on the Hot R&B/Hip-Hop Songs, number 11 on the Hot Rap Songs and number 1 on the Dance Singles Sales charts. The second single off of the album, "Hold On", reached number 39 on the Hot Rap Songs and number 27 on the Dance Singles Sales charts.

== Track listing ==
No.	Title	Writer(s)	Producer(s)	Length
1.	"Word Is Bond"	Lorenzo DeChalus; Derrick Murphy; Owen McIntyre; Roger Ball; Malcolm Duncan; James Hamish Stuart; Stephen Ferrone; Alan Gorrie	Lord Jamar; Sadat X (co.)	4:00
2.	"Straight off da Head"	DeChalus; Murphy	Lord Jamar	4:31
3.	"Weed Vs. Weaves" (Interlude)	Rudolph Toombs	Lord Jamar; Sadat X (co.)	0:52
4.	"Nubian Jam" (featuring Laura Alfored)	DeChalus; Murphy	Lord Jamar	5:20
5.	"Alladat" (featuring Busta Rhymes)	Murphy; Anthony Best	Buckwild	4:16
6.	"Step into da Cipher" (featuring Serge, Maestro Manny and Snagglepuss)	DeChalus; Murphy	Lord Jamar; Sadat X (co.)	5:14
7.	"Sweatin Bullets"	DeChalus; Murphy; Arnie Lawrence	Lord Jamar	3:59
8.	"Lookin' at God" (Interlude)		Lord Jamar	0:56
9.	"Lick Dem Muthaphuckas" (Remix)	DeChalus; Murphy	Lord Jamar	5:39
10.	"Another Day in the Beast" (Thoughts from a Criminal)		Lord Jamar	0:52
11.	"Claimin' I'm a Criminal"	DeChalus; Murphy	Lord Jamar; Sadat X (co.)	5:29
12.	"Gang Bang"	DeChalus; Murphy	Lord Jamar; Sadat X (co.)	3:32
13.	"Down for the Real"	DeChalus; Murphy; James Preston; James Nicholas; Jerome Dickins; Ralph Rolle	Lord Jamar	4:29
14.	"Return of the Dread"	DeChalus	Lord Jamar	4:52
15.	"What the Fuck..."	DeChalus; Murphy; Sheila Young	Lord Jamar	3:50
16.	"Hold On" (featuring Starr)	DeChalus; Murphy; Michael Hucknall; Neil Moss	Lord Jamar; Sadat X (co.)	4:15
Total length:				1:02:06

Sample credits

- Track 1 contains a sample of "I'm The One" performed by Average White Band.
- Track 3 contains a sample of "Wig Blues" performed by Lou Donaldson.
- Track 7 contains a sample of "Abdullah & Abraham" performed by Chico Hamilton.
- Track 11 contains a sample of "I'm Trying to Sing a Message to You" written by Homer Banks, Raymond Jackson and Carl Hampton and performed by Luther Ingram.
- Track 12 contains a sample of "Freddie's Dead" written and performed by Curtis Mayfield.
- Track 15 contains a sample of "I Love You for All Seasons" performed by The Fuzz.
- Track 16 contains a sample of "Holding Back the Years" written by Michael Hucknall and Neil Moss and performed by Simply Red.

== Charts ==
Chart (1994)	Peak position
UK R&B Albums (OCC)	38
US Billboard 200	54
US Top R&B/Hip-Hop Albums (Billboard)	13
