= Slow Down (Brand Nubian song) =

Single by Brand Nubian

from the album One for All
- Released: March 29, 1991
- Genre: Hip hop
- Length: 3:52
- Label: Elektra
- Songwriters: Derrick Murphy, Lorenzo DeChalus, Maxwell Dixon, Diana Fernandez
- Producers: Brand Nubian, Grand Puba

Brand Nubian singles chronology
"Wake Up" (1990)	"Slow Down" (1991)	"All for One" (1992)

Music video
- "Slow Down" on YouTube

"Slow Down" is a song by American hip hop group Brand Nubian. The song was recorded in 1990 and was released as a single on their 1990 debut album, One for All. "Slow Down" was later featured on the group's compilation album, The Very Best of Brand Nubian. The song notably samples the guitar riff and part of the chorus from "What I Am" by Edie Brickell. The song also samples "Let's Take It to the Stage" by Funkadelic, as well as "Kool It (Here Come the Fuzz)" by Kool & the Gang.

== Single track listing ==
- 12" single

A-side
No.	Title	Length
1.	"Slow Down (Radio Version)"	3:52
2.	"Slow Down (LP Version)"	5:00
3.	"Slow Down (Pete Rock's Newremix)" (Remix - Pete Rock)	5:20

B-side
No.	Title	Length
1.	"To The Right (LP Version)"	4:16
2.	"To The Right (Instrumental)"	3:40

== Charts ==
Chart (1991)	Position
U.S. Hot R&B Singles	63
U.S. Hot Rap Singles	3
