= Foundation (Brand Nubian album) =

Studio album by Brand Nubian
- Released: September 29, 1998
- Recorded: 1997–1998
- Studios: Acme Recording Studios; D&D Studios; The Diamond Mine; DMH Studios; Platinum Island Studios; Quad Recording Studios; Right Track Recording; Soundtrack Studios
- Genre: Hip-hop
- Length: 1:07:48
- Label: Arista
- Producers: Buckwild; Chris Liggio; Diamond D; DJ Alamo; DJ O.Gee; DJ Premier; Grand Puba; Lord Finesse

Brand Nubian chronology
Everything Is Everything (1994)	Foundation (1998)	Fire In The Hole (2004)

Singles from Foundation
- 1. "The Return" Released: 1998; 2. "Don't Let it Go to Your Head" Released: 1998; 3. "Let's Dance" Released: 1999

Professional ratings
Review scores
Source	Rating
AllMusic	4/5 stars
Los Angeles Times	3.5/4 stars
RapReviews	9/10
The New Rolling Stone Album Guide	3/5 stars
The Source	3.5/5 stars
The Village Voice	(3-star Honorable Mention)
Tom Hull	B+
XXL	4/5 (XL)

Foundation is the fourth studio album by American hip-hop group Brand Nubian. It was released on September 29, 1998, via Arista Records. The album marked the reunion of the four original members, Grand Puba, Sadat X, Lord Jamar and DJ Alamo, who hadn't released an album together since their 1990 debut One for All.

Production was handled by Lord Finesse, Chris "CL" Liggio, Buckwild, Diamond D, DJ O.Gee, DJ Premier, and members Grand Puba and DJ Alamo, with co-producer Swade Puma. It features guest appearances from Busta Rhymes, Common and Loon.

The album debuted at number 59 on the Billboard 200 and number 12 on the Top R&B/Hip-Hop Albums charts in the United States. The only charted single off of the album, "Don't Let It Go to Your Head", became Brand Nubian's biggest US hit, reaching number 54 on the Billboard Hot 100, number 24 on the Hot R&B/Hip-Hop Songs and number 3 on the Hot Rap Songs.

Foundation saw the group regain their past success, critically and commercially. Unlike previous releases, Foundation mostly features outside production, resulting in an updated sound.

== Track listing ==
No.	Title	Writer(s)	Producer(s)	Length
1.	"Here We Go"	O'Kelly Isley Jr.; Ronald Isley; Rudolph Isley; Marvin Isley; Ernie Isley; Chris Jasper	Grand Puba	0:22
2.	"The Return"	William Dixon; Lorenzo DeChalus; Derek Murphy; Chris Martin; Willie Clarke; Clarence Reid	DJ Premier	4:00
3.	"Shinin' Star"	Dixon; DeChalus; Murphy; Alphonso Mizell; Larry Mizell; Rodney Mizell	Grand Puba	3:40
4.	"The Beat Change"	Dixon; DeChalus; Murphy; Robert Hall; Michael Beinhorn; William Laswell	Lord Finesse	2:26
5.	"Migraine" (Interlude)			0:24
6.	"Don't Let It Go to Your Head"	Dixon; DeChalus; Murphy; Kenneth Gamble; Leon Huff	Chris "CL" Liggio	4:04
7.	"Brand Nubian"	Dixon; DeChalus; Murphy; J.J. Johnson	Buckwild	4:01
8.	"Maybe One Day" (featuring Common)	Dixon; Lonnie Rashid Lynn; Al Green	Buckwild	4:41
9.	"Let's Dance" (featuring Busta Rhymes)	Dixon; DeChalus; Murphy; Michael Jackson	Chris "CL" Liggio; Swade Puma (co.)	4:06
10.	"Back up Off the Wall" (featuring Loon)	Dixon; DeChalus; Murphy; Chauncey Hawkins; Keith Jones	DJ Alamo	4:10
11.	"Black on Black Crime" (Interlude)			0:48
12.	"I'm Black and I'm Proud"	Dixon; DeChalus; Murphy; Jones; James Brown; Alfred Rogers	Grand Puba; DJ Alamo	3:17
13.	"Sincerely"	Dixon; DeChalus; Murphy; Gary Scott	DJ O.Gee	3:50
14.	"Probable Cause"	Dixon; DeChalus; Murphy; Jones; Grover Washington Jr.	DJ Alamo	5:13
15.	"The Ghetto" (Interlude)			0:41
16.	"Love vs. Hate"	Dixon; DeChalus; Murphy; Hall	Lord Finesse	4:31
17.	"Too Late"	Dixon; DeChalus; Murphy; Jones; Norman Giscombe	Chris "CL" Liggio; DJ Alamo (co.)	4:45
18.	"Straight Outta Now Rule"	Dixon; DeChalus; Murphy; Hall	Lord Finesse	4:39
19.	"Foundation"	Dixon; DeChalus; Murphy; Joseph Kirkland; Miles Davis	Diamond D	3:52
20.	"U for Me"	Dixon; DeChalus; Murphy; Hall	Lord Finesse	4:18
Total length:				1:07:48

Sample credits

- Track 1 contains excerpts of "Here We Go Again" written by O'Kelly Isley Jr., Ronald Isley, Rudolph Isley, Marvin Isley, Ernie Isley and Chris Jasper performed by The Isley Brothers.
- Track 2 contains excerpts of "The Rub" written by Willie Clarke and Clarence Reid performed by George McCrae and Gwen McCrae, and samples from "To the Right" and "Step to the Rear" performed by Brand Nubian.
- Track 3 contains a sample from "Love to the World" performed by LTD.
- Track 4 contains samples from "Change the Beat" performed by Fab Five Freddy.
- Track 6 contains interpolations of "Don't Let It Go to Your Head" written by Kenneth Gamble and Leon Huff performed by Jean Carn.
- Track 8 contains a sample from "Have a Good Time" performed by Al Green.
- Track 9 contains excerpts of "Centipede" written by Michael Jackson performed by Rebbie Jackson and re-sung elements from "All Night Long" written by Lionel Richie.
- Track 11 contains audio snippet excerpts from the motion picture Don't Be a Menace to South Central While Drinking Your Juice in the Hood.
- Track 12 contains excerpts of "Say It Loud – I'm Black and I'm Proud" written by James Brown and Alfred Rogers performed by James Brown.
- Track 14 contains excerpts of "Knucklehead" written and performed by Grover Washington Jr.
- Track 15 contains audio snippet excerpts from the motion picture Rhyme & Reason.
- Track 17 contains samples from "Too Late" performed by Junior.
- Track 19 contains elements of "IFE" written and performed by Miles Davis.

== Personnel ==
- Brand Nubian – programming, mixing, executive producers
  - William "Grand Puba" Dixon – vocals, producer (tracks: 1, 3, 12), programming
  - Lorenzo "Lord Jamar" DeChalus – vocals
  - Derek "Sadat X" Murphy – vocals
  - Keith "DJ Alamo" Jones – producer (tracks: 10, 12, 14), co-producer (track 17), programming
- Lonnie "Common" Lynn – vocals (track 8)
- Keon Bryce – background vocals (track 8)
- Trevor "Busta Rhymes" Smith – vocals (track 9)
- Rebbie Jackson – additional vocals (track 9)
- Adeka "Dee" Stupart – additional vocals (track 9)
- Chauncey "Loon" Hawkins – vocals (track 10)
- Brooklyn Starr – background vocals (track 13)
- Shelene Thomas – additional vocals (track 17)
- James Tyrone "Petawane" Burris – additional vocals (track 20)
- Thomas Barth – keyboards (track 10)
- Gary "DJ O.Gee" Scott – piano & producer (track 13), programming
- Chris "DJ Premier" Martin – producer (track 2), mixing
- Robert "Lord Finesse" Hall – producer (tracks: 4, 16, 18, 20), programming
- Chris "CL" Liggio – producer (tracks: 6, 9, 17), programming
- Anthony "Buckwild" Best – producer (tracks: 7, 8), programming
- Joseph "Diamond D" Kirkland – producer (track 19), programming, mixing
- Swade Puma – co-producer (track 9)
- Jim Albert – recording
- Brian Garten – recording
- Dave Hyman – recording
- Thom Leinbach – recording
- Eddie Sancho – recording
- Kirk Yano – recording
- Andy Blakelock – mixing
- Jason Goldstein – mixing
- Ken "Duro" Ifill – mixing
- Matt Stein – mixing
- Patrick Viala – mixing
- Fred Hedemark – engineering assistant
- Bill Importico – engineering assistant
- G.P. – engineering assistant
- Jason Stasium – engineering assistant
- Dexter Thibou – engineering assistant
- Artese Williams – engineering assistant
- Tom Coyne – mastering
- Jeff Dixon – executive producer
- Drew Dixon – executive producer
- Anthony Harrison Jr. – art direction, illustration
- Christian Lantry – photography

== Charts ==
Chart (1998)	Peak position
US Billboard 200	59
US Top R&B/Hip-Hop Albums (Billboard)	12
