= Time's Runnin' Out =

Studio album by Brand Nubian
- Released: August 21, 2007
- Recorded: 1997–1998
- Genre: East Coast hip-hop; conscious hip-hop
- Length: 57:24
- Label: Traffic; The Orchard
- Producer: Brand Nubian; DJ Alamo; Grand Puba; Lord Finesse; Lord Jamar; Vance Wright

Brand Nubian chronology
Fire in the Hole (2004)	Time's Runnin' Out (2007)

Professional ratings
Review scores
Source	Rating
AllMusic	3/5 stars
RapReviews	7/10

Time's Runnin' Out is the sixth album by Brand Nubian. It was released on August 21, 2007, on Traffic Entertainment and featured production from Grand Puba, Lord Jamar, DJ Alamo, and Lord Finesse.

The material on the album was recorded in 1997 and 1998, before Foundation; several songs mention 1997 and 1998. Grand Puba mentioned in an interview with HipHopDX that this was the actual album that got them signed to Arista. After signing, the group kept on recording material, which resulted in Foundation.

While most of the album remained unreleased until 2007, a few of the songs had previously been released. "A Child is Born" originally appeared on the soundtrack of the 1997 movie Soul in the Hole, "Time is Running Out" was released on the soundtrack of the 1998 movie Slam, and a Buckwild remix of the song "Rockin' It" was released as a limited 12-inch single in 2000 with the D.I.T.C. track "Spend It" as the B-side.

== Track listing ==
Credits adapted from Discogs.

Time's Runin' Out standard edition
No.	Title	Producer(s)	Length
1.	"Intro"	Grand Puba	0:48
2.	"Seen Enough"	Lord Jamar	4:02
3.	"Girls, Girls, Girls"	DJ Alamo	4:01
4.	"One Time" (original version)	DJ Alamo	4:22
5.	"Scientists of Sound"	Grand Puba; Lord Finesse	4:50
6.	"Time's Runnin' Out" (original version)	Brand Nubian	4:14
7.	"Brand Nu Hustle"	Grand Puba	3:40
8.	"Once Again"	Lord Jamar	3:22
9.	"Rockin' It"	Grand Puba	3:41
10.	"I Wanna Hear It"	Grand Puba	3:34
11.	"A Child Is Born" (original version)	Vance Wright	4:18
12.	"Right Here"	Grand Puba	4:23
13.	"Enjoy Yourself"	Grand Puba	4:08
14.	"Go Hard"	Lord Jamar	3:06
15.	"Somebody Told A Lie"	Lord Jamar	4:14
Total length:			56:43
