= Fire in the Hole (album) =

Studio album by Brand Nubian
- Released: August 10, 2004
- Recorded: 2003–04
- Studio: State Street Studios (Brooklyn, NY)
- Genre: Hip-hop
- Length: 56:25
- Label: Babygrande
- Producer: Chuck Wilson (exec.); Lord Jamar (also exec.); DJ Alamo; Grand Puba; Sadat X

Brand Nubian chronology
Foundation (1998)	Fire in the Hole (2004)	Time's Runnin' Out (2007)

Singles from Fire in the Hole
- 1. "Whatever Happened...?" Released: 2004; 2. "Who Wanna Be a Star? (It's Brand Nu Baby!)" Released: 2004; 3. "Young Son" Released: 2004

Fire in the Hole is the fifth studio album by American hip-hop group Brand Nubian. It was released on August 10, 2004, via Babygrande Records. Recording sessions took place at State Street Studios in Brooklyn. Production was handled by members DJ Alamo, Grand Puba, Sadat X, and Lord Jamar, who also served as executive producer together with Chuck Wilson. It features guest appearances from Starr and Aisha Mike. The album made it to No. 57 on the Billboard Top R&B/Hip-Hop Albums chart in the United States.

== Critical reception ==
Professional ratings
Aggregate scores
Source	Rating
Metacritic	68/100
Review scores
Source	Rating
AllMusic	3/5 stars
HipHopDX	4/5
Pitchfork	6.5/10
RapReviews	8/10
Spin	B−
Stylus Magazine	C
The New Rolling Stone Album Guide	2.5/5 stars

Fire in the Hole was met with generally favorable reviews from music critics. At Metacritic, which assigns a normalized rating out of 100 to reviews from mainstream publications, the album received an average score of 68, based on seven reviews.

Steve 'Flash' Juon of RapReviews.com praised the album, saying: "may be one of 2004's most important rap records". Spin reviewer called it "a snappier comeback than 1998's Foundation". Writing for Pitchfork, Jamin Warren stated: "unfortunately, Fire in the Hole fails to invoke any effective nostalgia as it phlegmatically wanders through 12 solid but unexciting tracks".

In mixed reviews, AllMusic's Andy Kellman wrote: "few will ever refer to this as a classic, though even fewer will ever think of this as a poor showing". Gabe Gloden of Stylus Magazine found: "unfortunately, even when they attempt to paint a serious social commentary, they can’t seem to suppress their sophomoric potty humor".

== Track listing ==
No.	Title	Writer(s)	Producer(s)	Length
1.	"Who Wanna Be a Star? (It's Brand Nu Baby!)"	Lorenzo Dechalus; Derek Murphy; Maxwell Dixon	Lord Jamar	4:13
2.	"Young Son"	Dixon; Dechalus; Murphy	Lord Jamar	4:31
3.	"Where Are You Now?" (featuring Starr)	Murphy; Dixon; Dechalus	Lord Jamar; Sadat X	4:18
4.	"Just Don't Learn"	Dechalus; Murphy; Dixon; K. Jones	DJ Alamo; Lord Jamar	5:14
5.	"Still Livin' in the Ghetto" (featuring Starr)	Dechalus; Dixon; Murphy	Lord Jamar	5:44
6.	"Momma"	Dechalus; Murphy; Dixon; Jones	DJ Alamo	5:06
7.	"Got a Knot"	Dixon; Murphy; Dechalus	Grand Puba; Lord Jamar (add.)	4:27
8.	"Coming Years"	Dixon; Dechalus; Murphy	Lord Jamar	4:19
9.	"Whatever Happened...?"	Dechalus; Murphy; Dixon	Lord Jamar	4:06
10.	"Always Mine"	Murphy; Dechalus; Dixon	Lord Jamar	4:03
11.	"Ooh Child" (featuring Aisha Mike)	Murphy; Dixon; Dechalus	Grand Puba; Lord Jamar	4:46
12.	"Soldier's Story"	Dechalus; Murphy; Dixon	Lord Jamar	5:38
Total length:				56:25

== Personnel ==
- Lorenzo "Lord Jamar" DeChalus – vocals, producer (tracks: 1–5, 8–12), additional producer (track 7), recording, executive producer
- Maxwell "Grand Puba" Dixon – vocals, producer (tracks: 7, 11)
- Derek "Sadat X" Murphy – vocals, producer (track 3)
- K. "DJ Alamo" Jones – producer (tracks: 4, 6)
- Starr – vocals (tracks: 3, 5)
- Aisha Mike – vocals (track 11)
- Bernard Grobman – guitar (track 5)
- Chris Conway – mixing
- Emily Lazar – mastering
- Sarah Register – additional mastering
- Charles "Chuck" Wilson Jr. – executive producer
- Jeff Chenault – art direction, design
- Dennis Edwards – photography
- Seth Kushner – photography
- Jesse Stone – marketing

== Charts ==
Chart (2004)	Peak position
US Top R&B/Hip-Hop Albums (Billboard)	57
