= Brand Nubian =

American hip-hop group

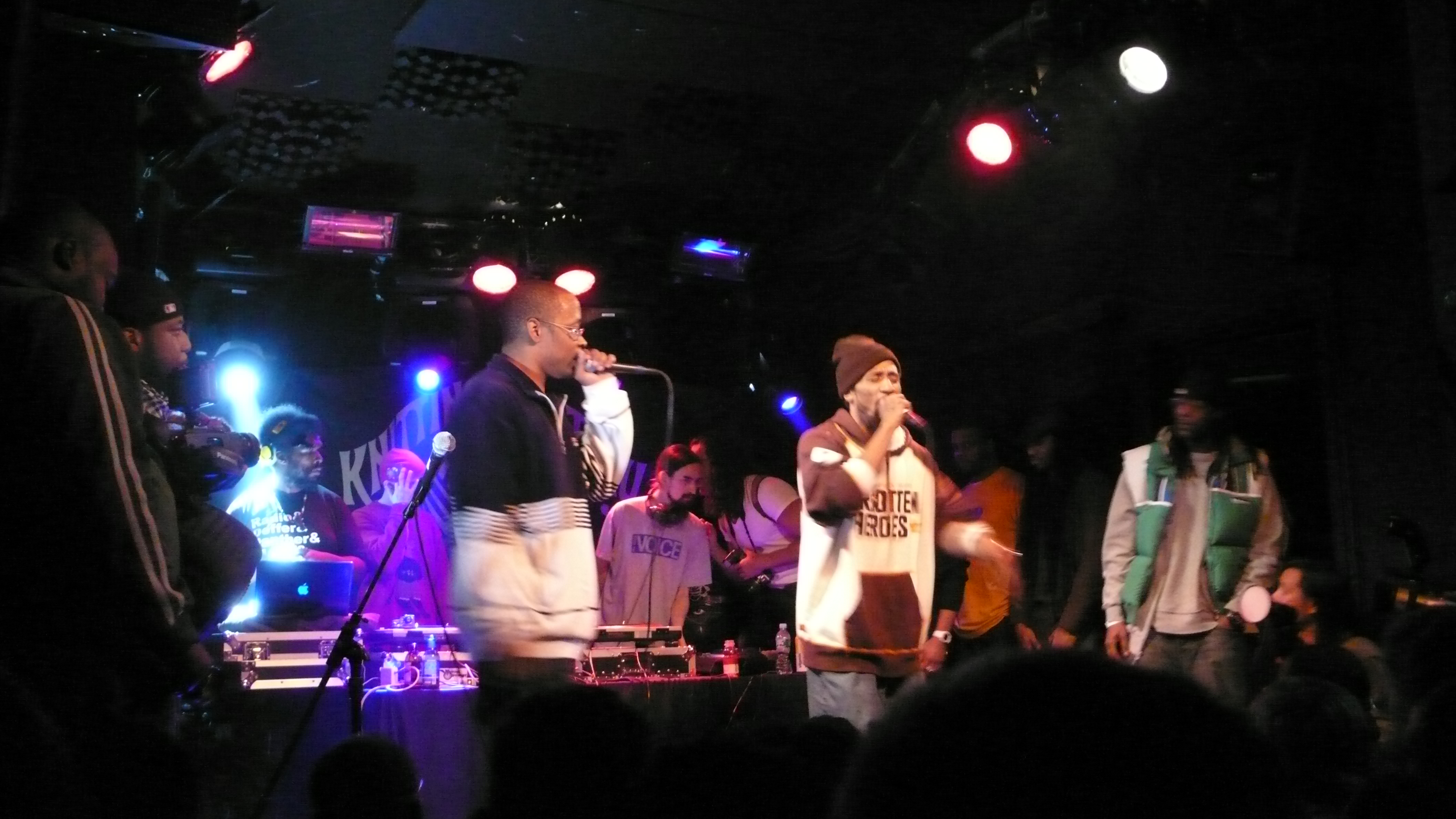
- Brand Nubian performing live in 2008

Background information
- Origin: New Rochelle, New York, U.S.
- Genres: East Coast hip-hop; political hip-hop; hip-hop; alternative hip-hop; conscious hip-hop
- Works: Brand Nubian discography
- Years active: 1989–1995; 1997–2000; 2003–present
- Labels: Elektra; Arista; BMG; Babygrande
- Members: Grand Puba; Lord Jamar; Sadat X; DJ Alamo
- Past members: DJ Sincere; DJ Stud Doogie

Brand Nubian is an American hip-hop group from New Rochelle, New York, composed of three emcees (Grand Puba, Sadat X and Lord Jamar), and formerly three DJs (DJ Alamo, DJ Sincere, and DJ Stud Doogie). Their debut studio album, One for All (1990), is one of the most popular and acclaimed alternative hip-hop albums of the 1990s, known for socially conscious and political lyrics inspired by the teachings of The Nation of Gods and Earths. In 2008, About.com placed the group on its list of the 25 Greatest Rap Groups of All Time.

== History ==
=== The Formation and naming Brand Nubian ===
In 1988, Grand Puba was looking to recruit new members to form a new band after his group Masters of Ceremony broke up. Sadat X, Lord Jamar and DJ Alamo all joined together. The group didn't have a name or any recorded demos to shop their music. While the group was at Tommy Boy records looking for a deal, they came across Dante Ross, an executive A&R at Elektra Records who liked their talents, but told them that they need a group name and a song. The group recorded their first ever demo called "I Ain't Goin' Out Like That" at Jazzy Jay Studios. After the group recorded their first demo, they started looking for names, while at a session of Jazzy Jay's studios. The word "Nubian" came about after Jamar read one of Dwight York's books. It was meant to be a new term for African American people. "Nubian" was the name at the time, then later on added the word "Brand" as in for "Brand New". Then "Brand Nubian" was put together. Puba stated in an interview with Jamar on the Yanadameen Godcast saying the conclusion of naming the group was at the mall in New Rochelle, when they finally made a decision for the group name. The group officially named themselves "Brand Nubian".

=== 1989–1992 ===
Brand Nubian formed in 1989, and their first single, "Brand Nubian", was released in 1989. Signed to Elektra Records by A&R man Dante Ross, their debut album, One For All, was released in 1990. Generally acclaimed, the album drew fire for militant Five-Percenter rhetoric on tracks such as "Drop the Bomb" and "Wake Up". The controversy helped selling in excess of 400,000 copies. A version of the Fab Five Freddy-directed video of the single "Wake Up", featuring a black man in white-face makeup, was banned from MTV. On that channel and from official WEA sources, this image was replaced by a Baptist preacher. The singles "Slow Down", "All for One", and "Wake Up" all became hits on the Billboard Hot Rap Tracks chart in 1991.

Shortly after the group's debut release, Grand Puba quarreled with Sadat X and Lord Jamar, and he left the group, along with DJ Alamo, to pursue a solo career. Following this, Lord Jamar and Sadat X asked DJ Sincere to join the group in 1992. The same year, Puba released his solo debut, Reel to Reel.

At the end of 1992, Brand Nubian released the single "Punks Jump up to Get Beat Down". The track created controversy because of its homophobic content such as Sadat X's line "I can freak, fly, flow, fuck up a faggot/I don't understand their ways; I ain't down with gays". The single charted on the Billboard Hot 100 at number 77. Later versions omitted the line and replaced it with different lyrics, including the version on the greatest hits compilation The Very Best of Brand Nubian.

=== 1992–1996 ===
In early 1993, Brand Nubian released their second album, In God We Trust, which included the singles "Punks Jump Up to Get Beat Down" and "Love Me or Leave Me Alone". That same year, the group's song "Lick Dem Muthaphuckas" was released as part of the Menace II Society soundtrack.

Brand Nubian's next release, Everything is Everything, was released in November 1994. Reviews were mixed and sales mediocre, despite the top-40 Hot Rap Tracks singles "Word Is Bond" and "Hold On". In 1995, Brand Nubian broke up and its members started solo careers in music and television. That same year, Grand Puba released his second solo album, 2000, featuring another Billboard Hot 100 single, "I Like It (I Wanna Be Where You Are)", and Sadat X released his first solo album, Wild Cowboys, in 1996.

=== 1997–2000 ===
Brand Nubian's original members reunited in 1997 and contributed "A Child is Born" to the Soul in the Hole soundtrack. In 1997, "Keep It Bubblin'" appeared on the Money Talks soundtrack. In 1998, Brand Nubian released the album Foundation on Arista/BMG Records. It featured contributions from producers such as DJ Premier, Buckwild, Lord Finesse, and Diamond D. The lead single "Don't Let It Go to Your Head" became, at number 54, the group's highest-charting single on the Hot 100. In 1999, Grand Puba and Sadat X were featured on "Once Again", from the first Handsome Boy Modeling School record. In 2000, Brand Nubian once again teamed up with Buckwild of D.I.T.C., releasing the single "Rockin' It", after which the members, once again, pursued their solo projects. Sadat X released a solo EP in 2000, The State of New York vs. Derek Murphy.

=== 2001–present ===
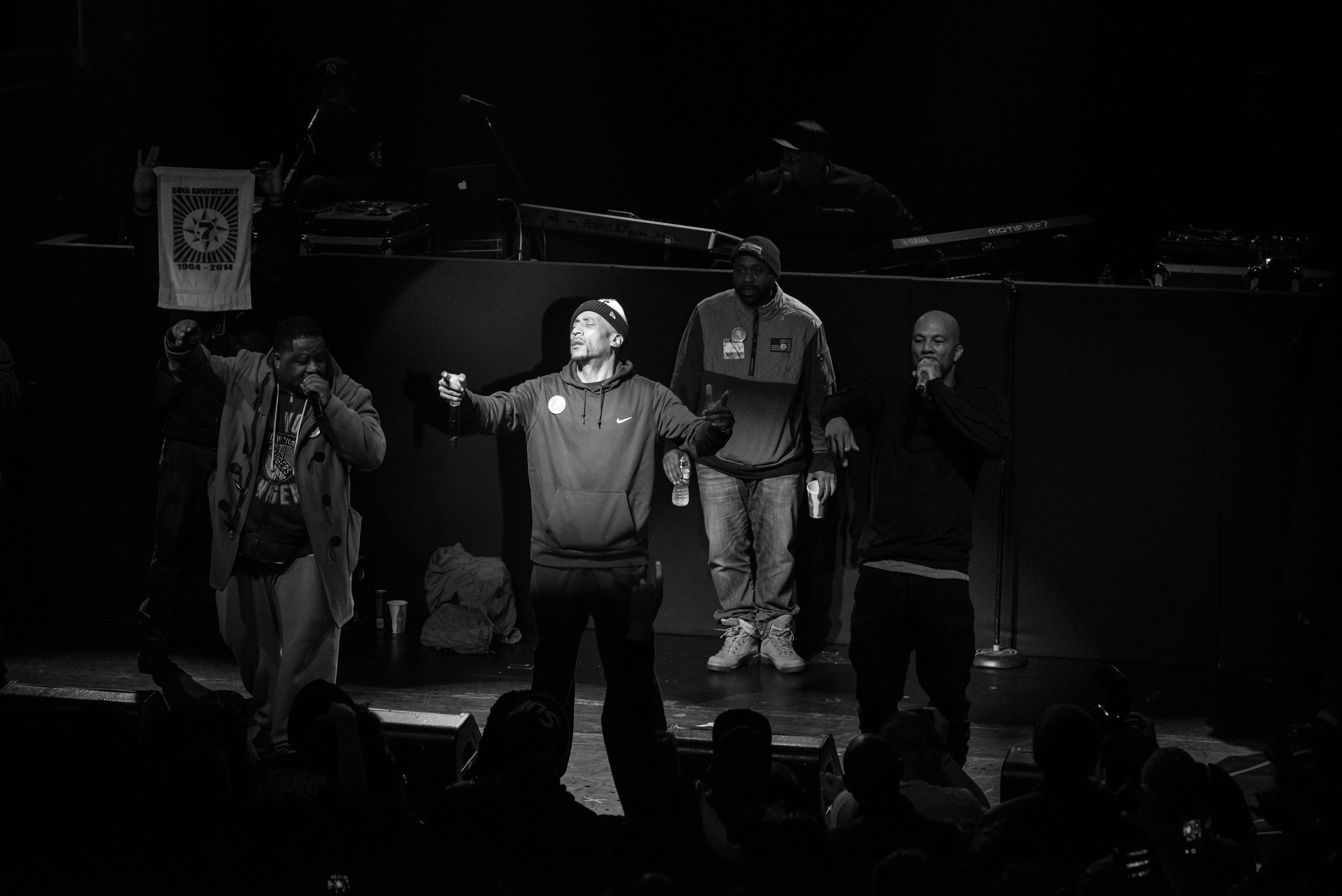
Brand Nubian performing with Common, 2014

Grand Puba released his third solo effort, Understand This, in 2001, which received little attention. Brand Nubian reunited once again in 2004 for their fifth album, Fire in the Hole, released by Babygrande Records. Sadat X released another solo effort in 2005, titled Experience & Education, to mostly positive reviews. Jamar pursued his acting career, appearing on an episode of The Sopranos, as well as episodes of Oz, Third Watch, and Law & Order. Lord Jamar released his first solo album, The 5% Album, in June 2006, on Babygrande Records. Sadat X's third album Black October came out in October 2006. In 2007, the group released an album titled Time's Runnin' Out, containing material recorded ten years earlier during the sessions for the 1998 Foundation album.

=== 2007–present: Touring ===
Since 2007, following the release of their latest group album and other solo projects, Brand Nubian still undertake live concerts. They have performed at sold out shows in the US and Europe.

== Members ==
- Grand Puba (1989–1991, 1997–2000, 2003–present)
- Sadat X (1989–1995, 1997–2000, 2003–present)
- Lord Jamar (1989–1995, 1997–2000, 2003–present)
- DJ Alamo (1989–1991, 1997–2000, 2003–present)
- DJ Sincere (1991–1995)
- DJ Stud Doogie (1997–2000, 2003–2021)

== Discography ==
Brand Nubian logo with a two finger peace symbol

Studio albums

- One for All (1990)
- In God We Trust (1993)
- Everything Is Everything (1994)
- Foundation (1998)
- Fire in the Hole (2004)
- Time's Runnin' Out (2007)
