= One for All (Brand Nubian album) =

Studio album by Brand Nubian
- Released: December 4, 1990
- Recorded: 1989–1990
- Genres: East Coast hip-hop; golden age hip-hop; alternative hip-hop; political hip-hop; conscious hip-hop
- Length: 71:34
- Label: Elektra
- Producers: Brand Nubian; Dante Ross (also exec.); Dave "Jam" Hall; Skeff Anselm; Stimulated Dummies

Brand Nubian chronology
One for All (1990)	In God We Trust (1993)

Singles from One for All
- 1. "Brand Nubian" Released: 1989; 2. "Feel So Good" Released: 1989; 3. "Wake Up" Released: November 7, 1990; 4. "Slow Down" Released: March 27, 1991; 5. "All for One" Released: January 1992

One for All is the debut studio album by American hip-hop group Brand Nubian, released on December 4, 1990, by Elektra Records. The album was highly acclaimed for its politically charged and socially conscious content. The album is mainly produced by Brand Nubian, but it also features production by Skeff Anselm, Stimulated Dummies, and Dave "Jam" Hall. The album's production contains many motifs of hip-hop's golden age including James Brown-sampled breakbeats and funky R&B loops. The album is broken down track-by-track by Brand Nubian in Brian Coleman's book Check the Technique.

== Reception ==
=== Commercial performance ===
One for All charted at number 130 on the U.S. Billboard 200, spending 28 weeks on the chart. It also reached number 34 on the Billboard Top Black Albums chart, on which it spent 40 weeks. Alex Henderson of Allmusic writes of the album's commercial performance, "In black neighborhoods of New York and Philadelphia, [One for All] was actually a bigger seller than many of the platinum gangsta rap releases outselling it on a national level."

=== Critical response ===
Professional ratings
Review scores
Source	Rating
AllMusic	4.5/5 stars
Encyclopedia of Popular Music	4/5 stars
Los Angeles Times	3.5/4 stars
The Rolling Stone Album Guide	4/5 stars
The Source	5/5 stars
The Village Voice	A−

One for All was a critical success upon its release. Los Angeles Times writer Steve Hochman called it "an impressive debut" and commended "the power of the lessons delivered with style and creativity", stating "There's a playful ease to this record recalling the colorful experiments of De La Soul, and there's as much sexual boasting as Islamic teaching." Jon Pareles of The New York Times described the album as "a peculiar merger of sexual boasting, self-promotion and occasional political perspective." J the Sultan of The Source gave it the publication's maximum five-mike rating and wrote that it "overflows with creativity, originality, and straight-up talent. [...] the type of record that captures a whole world of music, rhymes and vibes with a completely new style." In his consumer guide for The Village Voice, critic Robert Christgau gave One for All an A− rating, indicating "the kind of garden-variety good record that is the great luxury of musical micromarketing and overproduction. Anyone open to its aesthetic will enjoy more than half its tracks." He commented that "most black-supremacist rap sags under the burden of its belief system just like any other ideological music," but quipped, "This Five Percenter daisy-age is warm, good-humored, intricately interactive—popping rhymes every sixth or eighth syllable, softening the male chauvinism and devil-made-me-do-it with soulful grooves and jokes fit for a couch potato."

It has since received retrospective acclaim from publications such as AllMusic, Rolling Stone, and Trouser Press. AllMusic editor Alex Henderson complimented the group's "abstract rapping style" and stated, "On the whole, Nubian's Nation of Islam rhetoric isn't as overbearing as some of the recordings that other Five Percenters were delivering at the time." In The New Rolling Stone Album Guide (2004), music journalist Peter Relic stated, "they had a sobering lyrical style equally effective whether promoting African-American consciousness ('Concerto in X Minor') or telling hoes to chill (the Edie Brickell-sampling 'Slow Down')". Trouser Press writer Jeff Chang praised the group's "marriage of party groove and polemical grit" and cited the album as "a high point of East Coast hip-hop".

The album has reportedly sold 350,000 copies as of May 2013, and it has remained in print since its 1990 release.

=== Accolades ===
In 1998, the album was selected as one of The Source's 100 Best Rap Albums and its lead single "Slow Down" was featured on the publication's 100 Best Hip-Hop Singles of All Time list. One year later, Rolling Stone placed it on a list of the Essential Recordings of the 90's. It was additionally ranked number two on ego trip's 1999 list of "Hip Hop's 25 Greatest Albums by Year (1980–98)".

== Track listing ==
No.	Title	Songwriters	Producer(s)	Performer(s)	Sample(s)
1	"All for One"	M. Dixon, D. Murphy, L. Dechalus	Brand Nubian	Grand Puba, Sadat X, Lord Jamar	"All for One" by James Brown; "Can Mind" by James Brown; "Funky President" by James Brown; "Tramp" by Lowell Fulson; "Goodbye Love" by Guy
2	"Feels So Good" (CD Bonus Track)	M. Dixon, D. Murphy, L. Dechalus	Brand Nubian, Dante Ross	Sadat X, Grand Puba, Lord Jamar	"Just the Way You Are" by Billy Joel; "Sing a Happy Song" by War
3	"Concerto in X Minor"	M. Dixon, D. Murphy, L. Dechalus	Brand Nubian	Sadat X	"Walk Tall" by Cannonball Adderley; "Niggers Are Scared of Revolution" by The Last Poets; "Run, Nigger" by The Last Poets; "When the Revolution Comes" by The Last Poets; "New York, New York" by The Last Poets
4	"Ragtime"	M. Dixon, D. Murphy, L. Dechalus, S. Anselm	Skeff Anselm	Grand Puba, Sadat X, Lord Jamar	"Tommy's Groove" by The Gap Band
5	"To the Right"	M. Dixon, D. Murphy, L. Dechalus	Brand Nubian	Grand Puba, Sadat X, Lord Jamar	"Funky President" by James Brown
6	"Dance to My Ministry"	M. Dixon, D. Murphy, L. Dechalus	Brand Nubian	Lord Jamar	"Bad Tune" by Earth, Wind & Fire
7	"Drop the Bomb"	M. Dixon, D. Murphy, L. Dechalus	Brand Nubian	Grand Puba, Lord Jamar, Sadat X	"Jungle Jazz" by Kool & the Gang; "Anti-Nigger Machine" by Public Enemy
8	"Wake Up (Stimulated Dummies Mix)"	M. Dixon, D. Ross, J. Gamble, G. Dajani	Stimulated Dummies	Grand Puba	"Tanga Boo Gonk" by Nite-Liters; "Cissy Strut" by The Meters
9	"Step to the Rear"	M. Dixon, D. Ross, J. Gamble, G. Dajani	Stimulated Dummies	Grand Puba	"Just A Friend" by Biz Markie; "Oh Babe" by Cannonball Adderley; "Tramp" by Lowell Fulson; "Plantation Inn" by Mar-Keys; "Smooth Operator" by Big Daddy Kane
10	"Slow Down"	M. Dixon, D. Murphy, L. Dechalus, K. Withrow, E. Brickell; J. Houser, J. Bush, A. Aly	Brand Nubian	Sadat X, Lord Jamar, Grand Puba	"What I Am" by Edie Brickell & New Bohemians; "Let's Take It to the Stage" by Funkadelic; "Kool It (Here Come the Fuzz)" by Kool & the Gang; "N.T." by Kool & the Gang
11	"Try to Do Me"	M. Dixon, D. Murphy, L. Dechalus, D. Hall	Dave "Jam" Hall	Grand Puba	"Different Strokes" by Syl Johnson
12	"Who Can Get Busy Like This Man..."	M. Dixon, D. Murphy, L. Dechalus	Brand Nubian	Sadat X, Grand Puba	"Popcorn with Feeling" by James Brown
13	"Grand Puba, Positive and L.G."	M. Dixon, A. Arrington, C. Carter	Brand Nubian	Grand Puba, Positive K	"Nobody Can Be You" by Steve Arrington
14	"Brand Nubian" (CD Bonus Track)	M. Dixon, D. Murphy, L. Dechalus	Brand Nubian, Dante Ross	Lord Jamar, Sadat X, Grand Puba	"Rigor Mortis" by Cameo; "Rosita" by J. J. Johnson; "Flash Light" by Parliament; "Slide" by Slave
15	"Wake Up (Reprise in the Sunshine)"	M. Dixon, D. Murphy, L. Dechalus	Brand Nubian	Grand Puba	"Everybody Loves the Sunshine" by Roy Ayers; "Another Day" by Ray, Goodman & Brown; "Flash Light" by Parliament
16	"Dedication"	M. Dixon, D. Murphy, L. Dechalus	Brand Nubian	Grand Puba	"Say It Loud - I'm Black and I'm Proud" by James Brown

== Personnel ==
- Skeff Anselm – producer
- Carol Bobolts – design
- Brand Nubian – producer
- Geeby Dajani – mixing, producer
- John Gamble – mixing, producer
- Grand Puba – producer
- D. Hall – mixing, producer
- Dante Ross – executive producer, mixing, producer
- Mark Seliger – photography

== Charts ==
Chart (1991)	Peak position
US Billboard 200	130
US Top R&B/Hip-Hop Albums (Billboard)	34

=== Singles ===
Song	Chart (1991)	Peak position
"Slow Down"	U.S. Hot R&B/Hip-Hop Songs	63
"Slow Down"	U.S. Hot Rap Singles	3
"Wake Up"	U.S. Hot R&B/Hip-Hop Songs	92
"Wake Up"	U.S. Hot Rap Singles	5
Song	Chart (1992)	Peak position
"All for One"	U.S. Hot Rap Singles	17
