= Lord Jamar =

American actor, rapper and podcaster

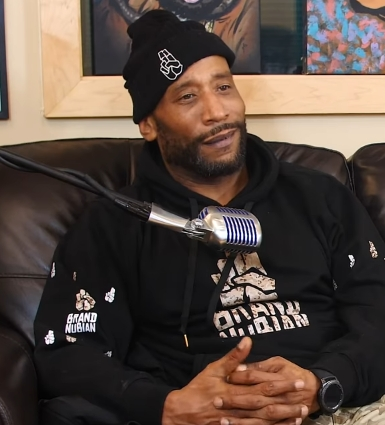
- Lord Jamar in 2020

Background information
- Born: Lorenzo Dechalus; September 17, 1968 (age 58); The Bronx, New York City, U.S.
- Origin: New Rochelle, New York, U.S.
- Genre: Hip-hop
- Occupations: Rapper; DJ; record producer; actor; podcaster
- Instruments: Vocals; sampler; keyboard; turntable
- Years active: 1989–present
- Labels: Babygrande; Koch; Elektra; Loud
- Member of: Brand Nubian

Lorenzo Dechalus (born September 17, 1968), known professionally as Lord Jamar, is an American rapper, DJ, record producer, actor, podcaster and conspiracy theorist. He is a founding member of the hip hop group Brand Nubian, which was formed in 1989. In 1996, he discovered Dead Prez and got them signed to Loud Records.

== Early life ==
Jamar was born in The Bronx, but was raised in New Rochelle. Jamar has Afro-Guyanese heritage on his father's side, and he is the eldest of three brothers. He was introduced to hip hop music in the 1970s through a friend who lived in his neighborhood, and he would listen to tapes of The Cold Crush Brothers, Grandmaster Flash and the Furious Five and The Sugarhill Gang. DJ Daryll C of Crash Crew used to take Jamar to hip hop shows in New York City. Jamar both sold and used crack cocaine during his teen years, but stopped after people he knew received sealed indictments. He dropped out of high school after failing ninth grade, and worked a few short-term jobs prior to signing a record deal.

== Career ==
Brand Nubian's debut studio album, One for All, was released in 1990 and is regarded by The Source as one of the all-time greatest hip hop albums.

Brand Nubian's third studio album, Everything Is Everything was released in 1994. In 1996, he discovered Dead Prez and got them signed to Loud Records. As an actor, Jamar is best known for his role of Supreme Allah on the TV series Oz. He has appeared on Law & Order: Special Victims Unit, Third Watch, and The Sopranos. He has also worked as a producer for artists such as Dead Prez, Buckshot, Shaka Amazulu the 7th and Tom Browne. His group went on to release their fourth album Foundation in 1998, with Grand Puba and DJ Alamo making their return to appear on the album.

He released his debut solo album The 5% Album (an album dedicated to the Nation of Gods and Earths) on June 27, 2006. Like his on-screen character on Oz, Jamar is a member of the Nation of Gods and Earths.

In 2018, Jamar launched a podcast, Yanadameen Godcast, with fellow rapper Rah Digga. It was later renamed to The God Pod with Lord Jamar.

== Personal life ==
In October 2000, Lord Jamar was arrested for slapping his wife, Dana Whitfield. The police found an unlicensed gun and two bullet proof vests in their home. He was later charged with assault and weapons possession.

== Views ==
=== Feud with Kanye West and views on homosexuality ===
Jamar released a diss track directed at Kanye West on February 4, 2013, titled "Lift Up Your Skirt", and stated that "gay has no place in hip-hop"; the song's homophobic lyrics attracted attention.

Later that year, Jamar criticized Macklemore's pro-LGBTQ song "Same Love" and accused him of promoting a gay agenda within hip hop. The Source described Jamar as an "anti-gay advocate" while reporting on his accusation that Macklemore was part of a "gay agenda".

In November 2013 in an interview with "XXL", Jamar stated that hip hop was not a, "gay music" genre and that homosexuality should not be promoted within hip hop. He further questioned whether same-sex relationships served as an evolution for the human species, claiming that evolution should "elevate" or benefit the species, questioning how same-sex relationships could constitute an "elevation for the species" because they do not result in reproduction. He rejected the premise that these views made him homophobic since he does not advocate for violence or discrimination against gay people.

Jamar expressed similar views in subsequent years. In 2016, he claimed he would collaborate with a gay musician but refused to participate in music that promotes homosexuality. He also argued that television programs such as Glee helped promote what he described as a "gay agenda".

=== Feud with Eminem ===
In a September 2013 interview on VladTV, Jamar declared that white rappers were "guests in hip hop"; he criticized Macklemore's "Same Love" for its pro-LGBT message. Eminem responded to Jamar with the track "Fall" from his 2018 album Kamikaze. Jamar responded to Eminem on his podcast.

=== Criticism of BLM ===
Lord Jamar has publicly stated that he does not support the Black Lives Matter movement. Jamar's primary reason for his opposition is his belief that the movement was not created for the Black community, but rather by "you know, George Soros and his fucking boys." He has articulated this viewpoint in various interviews and discussions, suggesting that the movement's origins or intentions do not align with his understanding of what serves the Black community's interests.

=== Holocaust denial ===
In a 2020 appearance with Nation of Islam influencer Rizza Islam, Jamar promoted Holocaust denial; he denied the death of six million Jews in the Holocaust, stating that at most 500,000 died, and claiming that six million Jews were not even present in Europe at the time.

=== Flat Earth ===
Dave Farina, known online as "Professor Dave Explains" (pictured 2020), debated Lord Jamar in 2025

In October 2024, Lord Jamar publicly expressed his belief in a flat earth during an appearance on an episode of the In Godfrey We Trust Podcast. His statements were based on what he described as "common sense" observations rather than scientific evidence. He argued that if the Earth were a sphere, pilots would constantly have to tilt their planes' noses down to avoid flying into space, a practice that he stated they do not do.

Lord Jamar's claims led to a public debate with science communicator David Farina, widely known by his YouTube channel name, "Professor Dave Explains". The debate, which took place on another In Godfrey We Trust Podcast episode, featured Farina systematically debunking Jamar's arguments using scientific principles and observational evidence. The exchange garnered significant attention online, with many viewers and commentators noting that Farina's responses directly addressed and refuted Jamar's points.

=== Politics ===
Jamar supported Donald Trump's 2024 presidential campaign.

== Discography ==
=== Studio albums ===
- The 5% Album (2006)

=== Guest appearances ===
List of guest appearances
Title	Year	Other performer(s)	Album
"Show Business"	1991	A Tribe Called Quest, Sadat X, Diamond D	The Low End Theory
"Verbal Intercourse (Non-Cross-Over Resistance Version)"	1991	Professor Griff, Killa Ranks, Sadat X, Wise Intelligent	Verbal Intercourse (VLS)
"Where Ya At? (Extended Version)"	1995	Mobb Deep, Chuck D, DA Smart, Erule, Merchant, RZA, Killah Priest, Sunz of Man, Brooklyn Zu	One Million Strong
"Bluesanova"	1996	Dead Prez	Hip Bop
"Live Wires Connect"	1996	UGK, Keith Murray	Don't Be a Menace to South Central While Drinking Your Juice in the Hood: The Soundtrack
"Tell Me (6 Karat Hip Hop Mix)"	1997	Groove Theory, Sadat X	Check the Vibe
"Collaboration of Mics"	1997	Artifacts, Lord Finesse	That's Them
"Street Parables"	1997	Shabazz the Disciple	Street Parables (VLS)
"That Real Live"	2000	QNC	Lean To (VLS)
"Oz Theme 2000"	2001	Kool G Rap, Talib Kweli	Oz: The Soundtrack
"Fightin' Clocks Remix"	2001	Ilacoin	Fightin' Clocks Remix (VLS)
"Keep It Movin"	2001	Grand Puba	Understand This
"The Classic Mix Part II"	2003	DJ Armsteady, Sadat X	The Enyce Experience
"Nitty Gritty (Dog Spelled Backwards Mix)"	2003	KMD, Busta Rhymes, Sadat X	Best of KMD
"Important Shit"	2005	Jus Allah, Agallah	All Fates Have Changed
"Chosen Few"	2006	Sadat X	Black October
"U-Riders"	2007	U-Fam	The War on Hip Hop
"Angel Dust"	2008	Hasan Salaam	Children of God
"Igod"	2008	Shaka Amazulu the 7th, Darkim Be Allah	The Black Stone of Mecca
"Engage the Enemy Remix"	2009	Blak Madeen	Sacred Defense
"Deep Space (Jay da Flex & Yoof Remix)"	2009	RZA	Wu-Tang Meets the Indie Culture, Vol. 2: Enter the Dubstep
"I See Dead People"	2009	Grand Puba, Rell	Retroactive
"Up Against the Wall"	2010	Group Home, MC Ace	Gifted Unlimited Rhymes Universal
"Apocalyptic Shit"	2011	Lord Superb	Perb Made It Possible
"Every Hood's a Harlem"	2011	Lord Superb	Perb Made It Possible
"Industry RMX 2"	2015	Large Professor, Inspectah Deck, Cormega, Roc Marciano, Sadat X	Re:Living
"When the Gods Sing"	2016	Sadat X, Dizhwar	Never Left (Deluxe Edition)
"I’m a gay black man"	2016	School of the Gifted	WuMinati III: Divine Evil
"Cut and Dry"	2016	Sadat X	Agua
"Street Disciples"	2017	Heaven Razah, Block McCloud, Rasul Allah	Zayin: You Only Live Twice

== Filmography ==
=== Film ===
Year	Title	Role	Notes
2000	Da Hip Hop Witch	Himself	
2002	Morning Breath	Devon	Short
2004	L-o-v-e	Melvin	Short
2005	Funny Valentine	Tim	
2006	They're Just My Friends	Light	
2007	Wifey	Jevin 'Huss' Jones	TV movie
2009	Father's Day	Rammel	Short
2009	Buffalo Bushido	Torchy	
2010	Drugs 101	Chucky	Short
2016	Kill for Me	Skull	
2020	Drug Affected	Chucky	

=== Television ===
Year	Title	Role	Notes
2001	Oz	Kevin 'Supreme Allah' Ketchum	Recurring cast: Season 4
2001	100 Centre Street	—	Episode: "No Good Deed Goes Unpunished"
2002	Law & Order	Leon Griggs	Episode: "Attorney Client"
2003	Law & Order: Special Victims Unit	Bad Ass / Javier / Leon	Guest cast: Season 4–5
2004–05	Third Watch	Raymond Morris	Recurring cast: Season 6
2006	The Sopranos	Da Lux	Episode: "The Fleshy Part of the Thigh"
2007	Ego Trip's The (White) Rapper Show	Himself	Episode: Episode #1.3
2011	Rescue Me	D'brickshaw	Recurring cast: Season 7
2012	Elementary	Raul Ramirez	Episode: "You Do It to Yourself"
2013	Person of Interest	Grishin	Episode: "Relevance"
2016	The Night Of	Tino	Recurring cast
2016	Money Power Respect	Himself	Episode: "Opening Arguments" and "Till Death Do Us Manage"
2018	Unsung	Himself	Episode: "Brand Nubian" and "Digable Planets"
2018	Hip-Hop Evolution	Himself	Episode: "Do the Knowledge"
2020	For Life	Elijah	Episode: "Character and Fitness"
2020–21	The Last O.G.	Divine	Guest cast: Season 3–4

=== Documentary ===
Year	Title
2004	And You Don't Stop: 30 Years of Hip-Hop
2010	The Furious Force of Rhymes
2012	Something from Nothing: The Art of Rap
2018	Black, White & Blue
2021	The Sixth Borough of Hip-Hop
2021	Buck Breaking
