= Sadat X =

American rapper (born 1968)

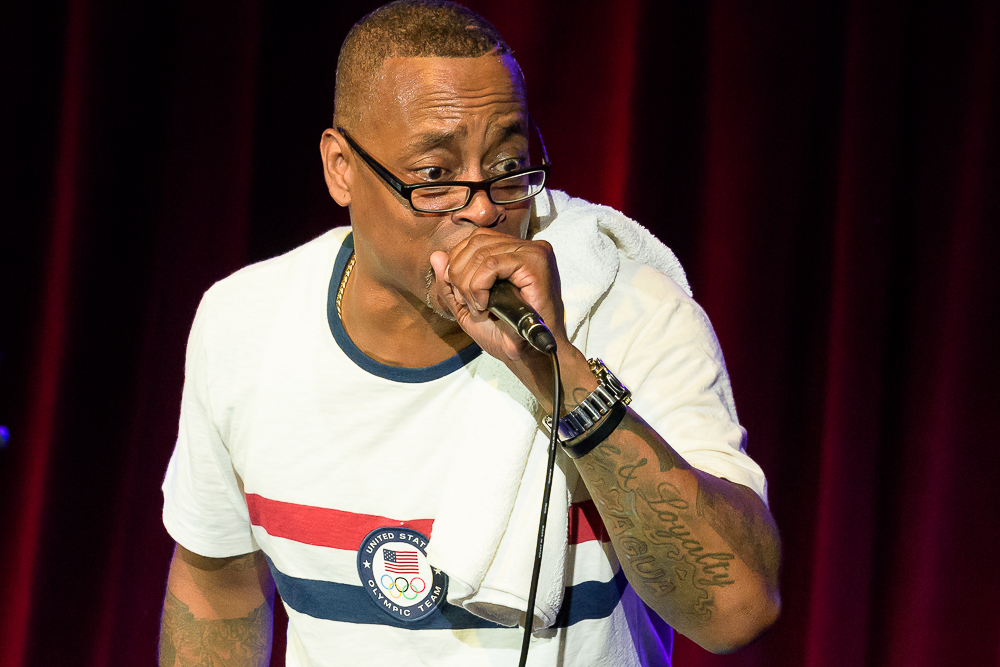
- Sadat X performing at the Rahzel and Friends – Brooklyn Bowl in 2016

Background information
- Also known as: Derek X (1990–1991); The Wild Cowboy; Dotty Boy
- Born: Derek W. Murphy; December 29, 1968 (age 57); The Bronx, New York City, U.S
- Origin: New Rochelle, New York, U.S.
- Genres: Hip-hop
- Years active: 1989–present
- Labels: Elektra; Loud; Arista; Relativity; Babygrande; Female Fun; Fat Beats; 6.8.2; Stimulated; Tommy Boy
- Member of: Brand Nubian

Derek W. Murphy (born December 29, 1968), better known as Sadat X, is an American rapper and educator, best known as a member of alternative hip-hop group Brand Nubian. Originally known as Derek X, Sadat takes his name from former Egyptian president Anwar Sadat.

== Early life ==
Sadat X was born in the Bronx, New York City. He and DJ Alamo are childhood friends who grew up together in the Bronx, where Sadat and his family lived at Concourse Village. Sadat's father and Alamo's father knew each other and grew up together in Harlem, New York City at Lincoln Projects. At age 11, he and his parents moved to New Rochelle where he met future Brand Nubian bandmates Grand Puba and Lord Jamar. He first started rapping after his father brought him a turntable to DJ. He was known as "DJ D-Rock" and "Kid Paradise". According to Jamar, Sadat's father had an extensive record collection of different genres of music to where Sadat would use for the group's discography of their albums. During his time while attending high school, he became a member of the Five Percent Nation after seeing one his family members and friends being involved as 5 Percenters.

Murphy played on the basketball team at Salesian High School in New Rochelle. He led Division III of the Catholic High School Athletic Association (CHSAA) in scoring with 22 points per game during the 1985–86 season. Murphy committed to play college basketball for the Howard Bison. He played point guard for the Bison basketball team.

== Career ==
Sadat made his debut with Brand Nubian in 1989, with the release of their debut single "Brand Nubian" b/w "Feels So Good". The group's debut album, One For All, was released on December 4, 1990, featuring the singles "All For One", "Wake Up" and "Slow Down".

Sometime around 1995, other members of Brand Nubian split up after releasing two albums, In God We Trust in 1993 and Everything Is Everything in 1994, while Sadat continue to make guest appearances and collaborations on albums with Diggin' in the Crates, as well as various artists. He would make an appearance on Biggie's "Come On" song, the original track that was supposed to be on Biggie's first album Ready to Die. The song was produced by Bronx native Lord Finesse.

In 1996, Sadat recorded on the Red Hot Organization's compilation CD America Is Dying Slowly, alongside Biz Markie, Wu-Tang Clan, Fat Joe and others. The CD, meant to raise awareness of the AIDS epidemic among African American men, was called "a masterpiece" by The Source. . He began working on first solo album, Wild Cowboys. The album was released on July 15, 1996, on Loud Records, featuring production work by DJ Ogee, Diamond D, Pete Rock, DJ Alamo, Minnesota, Da Beatminerz, Showbiz from Showbiz & A.G., Buckwild, Dante Ross, Ant Greene Father Time and Ali Malek.

In 1997, Sadat and Brand Nubian reunited together while recording some material for the group's new project. In 1998, he and Brand Nubian released their fourth album Foundation

In 1999, he collaborated with Chicago-based rapper Common along with Talib Kweli on a Hi-Tek track-produced song called "One-Nine-Nine-Nine".

On October 3, 2006, Female Fun Music released Sadat's third album, Black October. On March 23, 2010, Sadat X released Wild Cowboys II, the sequel to his 1996 solo debut Wild Cowboys, on Fat Beats Records. The album featured guest appearances from Ill Bill, Kurupt, A.G., Brand Nubian, Rhymefest and others, with production from Pete Rock, Diamond D, Buckwild, Sir Jinx, Will Tell and Dub Sonata. On February 23, 2010, he released an EP, containing five songs from the album and complementary instrumentals. The first single from the album was "Turn It Up" which features and is produced by, Pete Rock. In 2015, Sadat appeared in Mya Baker's documentary film Afraid of Dark which examined the experiences of Black men in America. In 2022, Sadat released his 12th studio album, Science of Life.

== Other work ==
In 2009, Sadat X and music producer Will Tell developed a wine-tasting web series entitled True Wine Connoisseurs. The wine show with a hip hop twist which had its fifth season in 2017. The series was shown on a YouTube channel directed and produced by Tom Calabraro.

== Legal issues ==
On December 22, 2005, Sadat was arrested in Harlem and charged with criminal possession of a weapon, reckless endangerment and resisting arrest.

== Personal life ==
Sadat X is involved in teaching children. He has worked as an elementary school teacher in New Rochelle, New York, qualified as a firefighter, and coaches children's basketball for the New York City Basketball League. He has a daughter.

== Discography ==
=== Studio albums ===
- Wild Cowboys (1996)
- Experience & Education (2005)
- Black October (2006)
- Generation X (2008)
- Brand New Bein' (2009)
- Wild Cowboys II (2010)
- No Features (2011)
- Love, Hell or Right (2012)
- Never Left (2015)
- Agua (2016)
- The Sum of a Man (2017)
- Science of Life (2022)

=== Extended plays ===
- The State of New York vs. Derek Murphy (2000)

=== Collaboration albums ===
- XL (with El Da Sensei) (2018)
- The Gods Have Arrived (with Agallah) (2020)

=== With Brand Nubian ===
- One for All (1990)
- In God We Trust (1993)
- Everything Is Everything (1994)
- Foundation (1998)
- Fire in the Hole (2004)
- Time's Runnin' Out (2007)

=== With Trinity ===
- 20 In (2013)

=== Guest appearances (excluding Brand Nubian) ===
- (1991) "Show Business" from The Low End Theory by A Tribe Called Quest
- (1992) "We Come to Get Wreck" from Straight from the Soul by Rough House Survivors
- (1992) "Day In The Life" from Stunts, Blunts and Hip Hop by Diamond D
- (1994) "Mansion and a Yacht" from A Constipated Monkey by Kurious
- (1994) "One Love (One L Main Mix)" from One Love 12" by Nas
- (1994) "Ya Don't Stop) from B-Ball's Best Kept Secret by Various Artists
- (1995) "Tell Me (6 Karat HipHop Mix) from Tell Me 12" by Groove Theory
- (1995) "Play It Cool" from 2000 by Grand Puba
- (1995) "I Like It (Remix)" from I Like It 12" by Grand Puba
- (1995) "What I Wanna Do" from V... As In Veronica by Veronica
- (1995) "Straight Talk from NY" from H by DJ Honda
- (1996) “(Stay Away From The) Nasty Hoes” from America Is Dying Slowly by Various Artists
- (1996) "Actual Facts" from The Awakening by Lord Finesse
- (1996) "The Next Spot" from High School High (soundtrack) by Various Artists
- (1996) "Heart Full of Sorrow" from Truth Crushed to Earth Shall Rise Again by House of Pain
- (1996) "Touch Y'all (Remix)" from The Raw Factor by Omniscence
- (1996) "Wild Cowboys in Bucktown" from Da Storm by O.G.C. (Originoo Gunn Clappaz)
- (1997) "Dreams (Frankie Cutlass Remix)" from Dreams 12" by Eternal (group)
- (1997) "Never" from Hatred, Passions and Infidelity by Diamond D
- (1998) "Money (Dollar Bill)" from Whitey Ford Sings the Blues by Everlast
- (1998) "Funky Beat" from Whitey Ford Sings the Blues by Everlast
- (1999) "Static" from Black Elvis/Lost in Space by Kool Keith
- (1999) "Handle Ur Time" from A Prince Among Thieves by Prince Paul (producer)
- (1999) "Once Again" from So... How's Your Girl? by Handsome Boy Modeling School
- (1999) "Come On" from the posthumous album Born Again by rapper The Notorious B.I.G.
- (1999) "One-Nine-Nine-Nine" from album Soundbombing II by Rawkus Records
- (2000) "Games" from the posthumous album The Big Picture by Big L
- (2001) "Don't Get It Twisted" from Infectious by Jigmastas
- (2003) "Ghetto Pop Life (Remix)" from GPL 12" by Danger Mouse (musician) & Jemini
- (2003) "Juggle" from Open Rhythm System by The Beat Kids
- (2005) "Bread & Butter" from The B. Coming by Beanie Sigel
- (2006) "Yes Sir" from Hidden Gems by O.C. (rapper)
- (2007) "Da God" from Jesus Price Supastar by Sean Price
- (2008) “The New Era B-Boy Pockets” from Carrots and Eggs by Moka Only
- (2008) "Stay In Ya Lane" from Operation Take Back Hip Hop by Craig G & Marley Marl
- (2008) "Keep It Classy" from Ja tu tylko sprzątam by O.S.T.R.
- (2008) "The Return" from Clin d'oeil by Jazz Liberatorz
- (2009) "Sound the Horns" from Wu-Tang Chamber Music by Wu-Tang
- (2010) "There Will Be Blood" from Nineteen Ninety Now by Celph Titled and Buckwild
- (2013) "Sam Peckinpah" from Legends Never Die by R.A. the Rugged Man
- (2017) "Música para Planchar" from Servicios Ambulatorioz by Alcolirykoz
- (2018) "Hood Operatic" from Brooklyn rapper Rashid Amir's album Graffiti Lips
- (2018) "Loot" from the album Speakeazy Suave-Ski
- (2019) "His Man Saw It" from The Foundation by Various Artists
- (2019) "Anti Mumble Rap" DJ Symphony
- (2020) "Real Hip-Hop" - DJ Symphony
- (2021) "Riot Gear" - Ben Shorr and DJ Boogie Blind
- (2021) "Sadat X's Interlude" - Sun Gin
- (2025) "Get With It" from Diam Piece 3 by Diamond D
- (2026) "Good Ol Days" Shane Dollar
- (2026) "Good Nutrition" from The Method by K-Rec and Checkmate
