= Grand Puba discography =

- Studio albums: 5
- EPs: 3
- Compilation albums: 1
- Singles: 10

The discography of American rapper and hip hop record producer Maxwell "Grand Puba" Dixon consists of five studio albums.

== Solo albums ==
=== Studio albums ===
List of studio albums, with selected chart positions
Title	Album details	Peak chart positions			
Title	Album details	US	US R&B/HH	US Indie	UK HH/R&B
Reel to Reel	Released: October 20, 1992; Label: Elektra Records	28	14	—	—
2000	Released: June 20, 1995; Label: Elektra Records	48	5	—	31
Understand This	Released: October 23, 2001; Label: Koch Records	—	32	12	—
Retroactive	Released: September 6, 2009; Label: Babygrande Records	—	97	—	—
Black from the Future	Released: April 15, 2016; Label: Babygrande Records	—	—	—	—
"—" denotes releases that did not chart, or was not released in that country.

=== Extended plays ===
Title	Details
The Origin (The Retirement Package, Vol. 1)	Released: May 16, 2025; Label: Melanin Music/Diggers Factory
The Retirement Package, Vol. 2	TBA
The Retirement Package, Vol. 3	TBA

== Singles ==
=== As lead artist ===
List of singles as lead artist, with selected chart positions, showing year released and album name
Title	Year	Peak chart positions				Album
Title	Year	US	USR&B	USRap	USDance	Album
"360° (What Goes Around)"	1992	68	30	1	21	Reel to Reel
"Check It Out" (featuring Mary J. Blige)	1992	110	85	13	—	Reel to Reel
"Ya Know How It Goes"	1993	—	—	—	—	Reel to Reel
"I Like It (I Wanna Be Where You Are)"	1995	91	68	21	3	2000
"A Little of This"	1995	109	90	21	29	2000
"Up & Down"	2000	—	—	—	—	Understand This.
"Understand This"	2001	—	—	—	—	Understand This.
"Issues"	2002	—	—	—	—	Understand This.
"I See Dead People" (featuring Lord Jamar & Rell)	2010	—	—	—	—	Retroactive
"The More Things Change"	2015	—	—	—	—	Black from the Future
"—" denotes releases that did not chart, or was not released in that country.

=== As featured artist ===
List of singles as featured artist, with selected chart positions, showing year released and album name
Title	Year	Peak chart positions									Album
Title	Year	US	USR&B	USRap	USDance	NDL	NZ	UK	UK R&B	UK Dance	Album
"Fight the Youth" (Remix) (Fishbone featuring Grand Puba)	1991										—
"Watch the Sound" (Fat Joe featuring Grand Puba & Diamond D)	1993	—	—	—	—	—	—	—	—	—	Represent
"Why You Treat Me So Bad" (Shaggy featuring Grand Puba)	1995	108	52	22	46	47	20	11	4	14	Boombastic
"Actual Facts" (Lord Finesse featuring Grand Puba, Large Professor & Sadat X)	1996	—	—	37	32	—	—	—	—	—	The Awakening
"Will You Be My Baby?" (Infinity featuring Grand Puba)	1996	—	—	—	—	—	—	53	8	23	—
"I Like What U Do to Me" (Jayla Jewel featuring Grand Puba)	1997	—	—	—	—	—	—	—	—	—	—
"East Coast Boy & West Coast Girl" (Grand Puba featuring Mya Campbell)	1999	—	—	—	—	—	—	—	—	—	DJ Skribble's Traffic Jams 2000
"—" denotes releases that did not chart, or was not released in that country.

== Guest appearances ==
List of non-single guest appearances, with other performing artists, showing year released and album name
Title	Year	Other artist(s)	Album
"Don't Curse"	1991	Heavy D & The Boyz, Big Daddy Kane, Kool G Rap, Q-Tip, Pete Rock, CL Smooth	Peaceful Journey
"Keep Control"	1991	Marley Marl, Tragedy Khadafi, King Tee, Def Jef, Chubb Rock, Rap Industry For Social Evolution	In Control Volume II (For Your Steering Pleasure)
"Fat Rat"	1991	—N/a	Strictly Business (soundtrack)
"Skinz"	1992	Pete Rock & CL Smooth	Mecca and the Soul Brother
"What's the 411?"	1992	Mary J. Blige	What's the 411?
"Who Makes the Loot?"	1992	The Brand New Heavies	Heavy Rhyme Experience, Vol. 1
"Three Men at Chung King"	1992	Chubb Rock	I Gotta Get Mine Yo! (Book of Rhymes)
"Ooh 4 You Girl"	1992	Al B. Sure!, Chubb Rock	Sexy Versus
"Are You Ready"	1994	The Beatnuts	The Beatnuts: Street Level
"Ya Don't Stop"	1994	Dana Barros, Cedric Ceballos, Diamond D, A.G., Sadat X	B-Ball's Best Kept Secret
"Let's Get It On"	1994	Eddie F. and the Untouchables, Heavy D, 2Pac, Notorious B.I.G., Spunk Bigga	Let's Get It On: The Album
"Oh Susannah"	1994	Mr. Freeze and the Homewreckers	Cold Wave of Terror
"All Men Are Dogs (9 Dog MC's Mix)"	1995	Red Bandit, Biggie, Pudgie, Positive K, Snag-a-Puss, Raggedy Andy, Grand Daddy I.U.	Non-album single
"Straight Talk from NY"	1995	DJ Honda, Sadat X, Wakeem	h
"Black Family Day"	1995	—N/a	Pump Ya Fist (Hip Hop Inspired by the Black Panthers)
"The Next Spot"	1996	Sadat X	High School High: The Soundtrack
"Open Bar"	1996	Sadat X	Wild Cowboys
"Dreams (Frankie Cutlass Remix)"	1997	Eternal	Non-album single
"Distant Lover (Remix)"	1997	Taral	Non-album single
"R U Ready II"	1998	The Beatnuts	Remix EP: The Spot
"7XL"	1999	Sir Menelik, Sadat X	Soundbombing II
"Once Again (Here to Kick One for You)"	1999	Handsome Boy Modeling School, Sadat X	So... How's Your Girl?
"Just Music"	2003	Nobody Beats the Beats	The Second Coming
"Something's Going Down Tonight"	2003	Ugly Duckling	Taste the Secret
"All for Nothing"	2004	Sharkey	Sharkey's Machine
"Bread & Butter"	2005	Beanie Sigel, Sadat X	The B. Coming
"My Struggles"	2005	Missy Elliott, Mary J. Blige	The Cookbook
"The Corner, The Streets"	2006	Lord Jamar	The 5% Album
"Mega Fresh X"	2009	Cormega, Kool DJ Red Alert, PMD, KRS-One, Big Daddy Kane	Born and Raised
"There Will Be Blood"	2010	Celph Titled, Buckwild, Sadat X, A.G., O.C., Diamond D	Nineteen Ninety Now
"Unwritten Script"	2014	Arika Kane	Thru the Veil
"Forever My Love"	2014	Guts	Hip Hop After All
"Regrets"	2015	Shuko, Kinga Lizz	For the Love of It
“More rugged”	2015	Moka Only	Magickal Weirdness
"Cartel"	2018	Kool Keith, Dane Uno	Total Orgasm 5
"Free Bird"	2018	Blahzay Blahzay	ENYthyng Iz Possible
"Check One, Two"	2021	Stezo, Chris Lowe, Chubb Rock, Kia Jeffries	The Last Dance
