= Hard Sell (disambiguation) =

Hard sell is an advertisement that uses a direct, forceful, and overt sales message.

Hard Sell may also refer to:

== Film ==
- Hard Sell (film), a 2016 American comedy-drama directed by Sean Nalaboff

== Music ==
- The Hard Sell, a 2007 live DJ mix album by DJ Shadow and Cut Chemist
- The Hard Sell (Encore), a 2008 album by DJ Shadow and Cut Chemist

== Television ==
- Hard Sell (TV series), a British reality television series
- "Hard Sell" (Beavis and Butt-head episode), a 1994 episode of Beavis and Butt-head
- "Hard Sell" (Ewoks)
