= The Funky Precedent =

Compilation album by various artists
- Released: September 21, 1999
- Genres: Hip-hop, progressive hip-hop
- Label: No Mayo/Loosegroove

Various artists chronology
The Funky Precedent	The Funky Precedent Vol. 2

The Funky Precedent is a hip-hop compilation album, released by No Mayo and Loosegroove Records on September 21, 1999. The proceeds were used to support the music education programs of three California high schools. It was followed by The Funky Precedent Vol. 2, in 2001.

== Production ==
The album was conceived by Charles Raggio, who was an admirer of progressive hip-hop from Los Angeles. The only previously released track was Ozomatli's "Cumbia de los Muertos". "S.N.T. (Live at Peacepipe)" blends live instrumentation by Miles Tackett with the turntablism of Cut Chemist. "The Audition" is also a turntablism track, by Rhettmatic of the Beat Junkies. Ugly Duckling's "Journey to Anywhere (With Piano Bar Intro)" was influenced by old-school hip-hop.

== Critical reception ==
Professional ratings
Review scores
Source	Rating
AllMusic	4.5/5 stars
Robert Christgau	(1-star Honorable Mention)
Detroit Free Press	4/4 stars
The Oregonian	B
The Sydney Morning Herald	4/4 stars

The Detroit Free Press said, "Emphasizing a low-fi sound—often just a DJ on two turntables and MCs—the album is a lesson in creativity." The Oregonian noted that "all of these tracks have either interesting, intelligent lyrics or bumping grooves... The best track, however, might be from electric guitarist Damon Aaron". The Sydney Morning Herald called the compilation "a big hip-hop party of extraordinary diversity that rewards great volume". Perfect Sound Forever likened Cut Chemist's work to that of Double Dee and Steinski. Robert Christgau praised "Triple Optics (Live Funky Precedent Mix)" and "Getcho Soul Togetha".

Ann Powers, of The New York Times, listed The Funky Precedent as the tenth best album of 1999, writing that it "encapsulate a scene that overflows with what hip-hop needs: skilled lyricists, innovative D.J.'s, grass-roots politics and lots of laughs." The Dallas Morning News listed it as the second best hip-hop album of 1999. The Philadelphia Inquirer included it among the 20 best albums of the year. Spin considered it among the ten best 1999 "records you didn't hear".

AllMusic concluded, "The Funky Precedent is one solid good vibe from beginning to end."

== Track listing ==
No.	Title	Artist	Length
1.	"Triple Optics (Live Funky Precedent Mix)"	Dilated Peoples
2.	"Concrete Schoolyard (Funky Precedent Edit)"	Jurassic 5
3.	"Musically Inclined"	Abstract Tribe Unique
4.	"S.N.T. (Live at Peacepipe)"	Cut Chemist & Miles Tackett
5.	"Journey to Anywhere (With Piano Bar Intro)"	Ugly Duckling
6.	"The Audition"	Rhettmatic
7.	"Getcho Soul Togetha"	Breakestra
8.	"Cumbia de los Muertos"	Ozomatli
9.	"Building"	Blk Sonshine feat. Masauko Chipembere
10.	"To the Outside"	Damon Aaron
11.	"Good Vibrations"	Miles Tackett
12.	"Ambiguous Figures"	Styles of Beyond
13.	"Make It Plain"	Divine Styler
14.	"Project Bliznaiznowed"	Aceyalone
15.	"Get Sober"	Black Eyed Peas
16.	"Save the Music"	Mikah 9
