= The Hard Sell =

Live album by DJ Shadow and Cut Chemist
- Released: January 2007
- Genre: Hip-hop
- Length: 69:40
- Label: Pillage Roadshow
- Producer: DJ Shadow, Cut Chemist

DJ Shadow chronology
| Live at Brixton Academy December 2006 (2006) | The Hard Sell (2007) | Bay Area EP (2007) |

Cut Chemist chronology
| The Audience's Listening (2006) | The Hard Sell (2007) | The Hard Sell (Encore) (2008) |

Alternate cover

The Hard Sell is a live DJ mix album by American music producers and turntablists DJ Shadow and Cut Chemist, released in January 2007. The album is a recording of a rehearsal by the two producers for a June 2007 show at the Hollywood Bowl.

== Background and recording ==
In 2007, DJ Shadow and Cut Chemist were invited to perform at the Hollywood Bowl amphitheater in Los Angeles, California. With the opportunity to be the first headlining turntablists in the history of the venue, they accepted the invitation. The Hard Sell was recorded during rehearsals for their June 2007 Hollywood Bowl show. The album is primarily a DJ mix of various 7-inch vinyl singles, similar in nature to the previous DJ Shadow and Cut Chemist albums Brainfreeze (1999) and Product Placement (2001). Before recording, the two spent several days listening to potential candidates for inclusion on the set; during the process, they eventually started to "narrow down a theme and feel based on [their] feelings about music at the time." According to DJ Shadow, the two sought to "push the boundaries of good taste" by putting together a set "that would alternatively make people smile and nod their head, and the next moment throw them off their balance and think 'Whoa, I'm not sure if I'm down with this.'" Eight turntables, four mixers, and two guitar pedals were utilized in creating the mix.

Professional ratings
Review scores
| Source | Rating |
|---|---|
| Soundcheck | (not rated) link |

== Track listing ==
1. "The Hard Sell (Part I)" – 42:27
2. "The Hard Sell (Part II)" – 27:13

== Samples ==
"The Hard Sell (Part I)"

- "Rock Around the Clock" by Telex
- Spoken words from the film Casablanca
- "This Can't Be True" by Eddie Holman and the Larks
- "Eye of the Tiger" by Big Daddy
- "I Only Have Eyes for You" by The Flamingos
- Spoken words from Robert Plant
- "Summer in the City" by Quincy Jones
- "Rebirth of Slick (Cool Like Dat)" by Digable Planets
- "Magic Mountain" by Eric Burdon and War
- "Synthetic Substitution" by Melvin Bliss
- "Soupy" by Maggie Thrett
- A version of "España cañí"

"The Hard Sell (Part II)"

- "The Way You Move" by OutKast
- "Everlong" by the Foo Fighters
- "Somebody to Love" by Jefferson Airplane
- "Break on Through (To the Other Side)" by The Doors
- A cover of "Whoa Back Buck" (originally by Lead Belly)
- Spoken words about cocaine
- "We've Got a File on You" by Blur
