= Behind the Beat =

2005 book by Rafael Rashid

Behind the Beat: Hip Hop Home Studios
- Author: Raph (Rafael Rashid)
- Illustrator: Beci Orpin
- Cover artist: Rex
- Language: English
- Subject: Hip hop
- Genre: Non-fiction
- Publisher: Gingko Press
- Publication date: November 15, 2005
- Publication place: United States
- Pages: 168 pp
- ISBN: 1-58423-197-1
- OCLC: 150332583
- Dewey Decimal: 782.421649 22
- LC Class: ML87 .R37 2005

Behind the Beat: Hip Hop Home Studios is a book by Raph (Rafael Rashid) where the home studios of twenty-eight notable American and British hip-hop producers are photographed (such as DJ Premier, J Dilla, Madlib, and DJ Shadow), along with brief descriptions of the producers and their studios. It was published in 2005 by Gingko Press.

== Background ==
Rafael Rashid runs Crookneck, a Melbourne-based record label, and the clothing labels Blank and Princess Tina, which he co-owns. He originally photographed skateboarding, managing to get a few pictures published. He took on shooting home studios around 1995, when some of his friends began producing techno from their houses. Rashid was impressed with the quantity of gear they had in their apartments, saying:

I remember being blown away by that at the time, thinking I need to take a photo of this. But I wasn’t a photographer or anything. That was my earliest memory of a home studio. I’d always been interested in, and always known, producers.

The first studio he photographed for the book was that of DJ Shadow, whom he contacted when he passed through his town. Shadow agreed to show Rashid his house for a shoot, and then introduced him to Dan the Automator. Rashid explained that most of the people he met were through other people's relationships, saying: "Producers know producers, and that would keep rolling."

== Content ==
Behind the Beat contains 320 black-and-white and color photographs, all shot using a square-format Hasselblad camera.

The book features photos of the following producers' home studios: Young Einstein of Ugly Duckling, Chief Xcel of Blackalicious, DJ Spinna, Thes One of People Under The Stairs, The Nextmen, Dan The Automator (Gorillaz, Handsome Boy Modeling School), The Grouch, DJ Ransom, Farma G of Task Force, Da Beatminerz, DJ Shadow, Mario Caldato, Jr. (engineer of Beastie Boys), Huw72 of Beyond There, Cut Chemist, Sereck of Def Wish Cast, Kutmasta Kurt, Skitz, Madlib, J-Zone, DJ Premier, DJ Nu-Mark of Jurassic 5, Fat Jack, deNorthwode, DJ Swamp, DJ Design of Foreign Legion, Jehst, E-Swift of Tha Alkaholiks, J Dilla.

The book also includes an audio CD featuring music by several artists included in the book, mixed by DJ Ransom.

== Reception ==
The book met with a certain success with music enthusiasts, and has been re-printed several times by the editor. Rashid's pictures of J Dilla have since been acquired by the Smithsonian's National Museum of African American History and Culture.

Rachid released a sequel to this book in 2017, under the name of Back To The Lab, featuring producers such as Flying Lotus, Just Blaze, DJ Jazzy Jeff et DJ Vadim.
