= I Like It (I Wanna Be Where You Are) =

1995 single by Grand Puba

Single by Grand Puba

from the album 2000
- Released: 1995
- Recorded: 1994–1995
- Studio: Soundtrack Studios (New York, NY); Platinum Island Studios (New York, NY); Battery Studios (New York, NY); V. Dubbs Studios; Acme Recording Studios (Mamaroneck, NY); Fiber Studios; Chung King Studios (New York, NY)
- Genre: Hip-hop
- Length: 4:23
- Label: Elektra
- Songwriters: Maxwell Dixon; Eldra DeBarge; Etterlene DeBarge; William DeBarge; Arthur Ross; Leon Ware; Richard Addrisi; Donald Addrisi
- Producer: Mark Sparks

Grand Puba singles chronology
"Watch the Sound" (1993)	"I Like It (I Wanna Be Where You Are)" (1995)	"A Little of This" (1995)

Music video
- "I Like It (I Wanna Be Where You Are)" on YouTube

"I Like It (I Wanna Be Where You Are)" is a song by American rapper Grand Puba and the lead single from his second studio album, 2000 (1995). It is a love song driven by vibraphone and xylophone. Produced by Mark Sparks, the song contains samples of "I Like It" by DeBarge, "I Wanna Be Where You Are" by Michael Jackson and Cal Tjader's version of "Never My Love". It peaked at numbers 78 and 91 on the US Cash Box Top 100 and Billboard Hot 100 charts.

== Critical reception ==
The song received generally positive reviews. Will Ashon of Muzik called it "slinking" and cited it as among the two tracks on 2000 that "particularly grab the attention for sheer quality". Reviewing the album for Rap Pages, Tracii McGregor commended the song alongside "A Little of This", writing "Aptly sculpted by underrated old-school producer Mark Spark, both the tracks and lyrics—riddled with Pu's dry sarcasm and comedy—are probably the most representative of Puba's personal evolution." Nicholas Poluhoff of The Source praised the song's "nice xylophone loop".

== Charts ==
Chart (1995)	Peak position
US Billboard Hot 100	91
US Hot R&B/Hip-Hop Songs (Billboard)	68
US Hot Rap Songs (Billboard)	21
US Dance Singles Sales (Billboard)	3
US Cash Box Top 100	78
