= A Little of This =

1995 single by Grand Puba

Single by Grand Puba

from the album 2000
- Released: 1995
- Recorded: 1994–1995
- Studio: Soundtrack Studios (New York, NY); Platinum Island Studios (New York, NY); Battery Studios (New York, NY); V. Dubbs Studios; Acme Recording Studios (Mamaroneck, NY); Fiber Studios; Chung King Studios (New York, NY)
- Genre: Hip-hop
- Length: 3:40
- Label: Elektra
- Songwriters: Maxwell Dixon; Larry Mizell
- Producer: Mark Sparks

Grand Puba singles chronology
"I Like It (I Wanna Be Where You Are)" (1995)	"A Little of This" (1995)	"Why You Treat Me So Bad" (1995)

Music video
- "A Little of This" on YouTube

"A Little of This" is a song by American rapper Grand Puba and the second single from his second studio album 2000 (1995). Produced by Mark Sparks, it contains a sample of "Just a Love Child" by Bobbi Humphrey.

== Critical reception ==
Reviewing 2000 for Rap Pages, Tracii McGregor commended the song alongside "I Like It (I Wanna Be Where You Are)", writing "Aptly sculpted by underrated old-school producer Mark Spark, both the tracks and lyrics—riddled with Pu's dry sarcasm and comedy—are probably the most representative of Puba's personal evolution."

== Charts ==
Chart (1995)	Peak position
US Bubbling Under Hot 100 (Billboard)	9
US Hot R&B/Hip-Hop Songs (Billboard)	90
US Hot Rap Songs (Billboard)	21
US Dance Singles Sales (Billboard)	29
