= Soft sell =

Type of advertisement

In advertising, a soft sell is an advertisement or campaign that uses a more subtle, casual, or friendly sales message. This approach is the opposite of a hard sell.

Theorists have examined the value of repetition for soft sell versus hard sell messages, in order to determine their relative efficacy. Frank Kardes and others have concluded that a soft sell, with an implied conclusion rather than an overt hard sell, can often be more persuasive. Soft sell is also less likely to be irritating to consumers.

== See also ==
- Hard sell
- Advertising
- Psychological manipulation
