= 2000 (Grand Puba album) =

Studio album by Grand Puba
- Released: June 20, 1995
- Recorded: 1994–1995
- Studio: Soundtrack Studios (New York, NY); Platinum Island Studios (New York, NY); Battery Studios (New York, NY); V. Dubbs Studios; Acme Recording Studios (Mamaroneck, NY); Fiber Studios; Chung King Studios (New York, NY)
- Genre: Hip-hop
- Length: 48:07
- Label: Elektra
- Producer: Mark Sparks; Minnesota; DJ Alamo; Chris Liggio; Dante Ross

Grand Puba chronology
Reel to Reel (1992)	2000 (1995)	Understand This (2001)

Singles from 2000
- 1. "I Like It (I Wanna Be Where You Are)" Released: 1995; 2. "A Little Of This" Released: 1995

Professional ratings
Review scores
Source	Rating
AllMusic	3/5 stars
Muzik	5/5 stars
Rolling Stone Album Guide	2/5 stars
Rap Pages	7/10
The Source	4/5 stars

2000 is the second solo studio album by American rapper Grand Puba. It was released on June 20, 1995, through Elektra Records. The recording sessions took place at Soundtrack Studios, Platinum Island Studios, Battery Studios, V. Dubbs Studios, Acme Recording Studios, Fiber Studios, and Chung King Studios in New York. The album was produced by Mark Sparks, Minnesota, DJ Alamo, Chris Liggio, and Dante Ross. It peaked at number 48 on the Billboard 200 and at number 5 on the Top R&B/Hip-Hop Albums in the United States.

Two singles were released in support of the album: "I Like It (I Wanna Be Where You Are)" and "A Little of This". Its lead single, "I Like It (I Wanna Be Where You Are)", reached No. 91 on the Billboard Hot 100, No. 68 on the Hot R&B/Hip-Hop Songs chart, No. 21 on the Hot Rap Songs chart, and was featured in the soundtrack for the video game Tony Hawk's Underground 2. The album's second single, "A Little of This" featuring backing vocals from Kid, reached No. 90 on the Hot R&B/Hip-Hop Songs chart and No. 21 on the Hot Rap Songs chart.

== Track listing ==
No.	Title	Writer(s)	Producer(s)	Length
1.	"Very Special" (featuring Michelle Valdes Valentin)	M. Dixon	Mark Sparks	5:15
2.	"I Like It (I Wanna Be Where You Are)"	M. Dixon; E. DeBarge; E. DeBarge; W. DeBarge; A. Ross; L. Ware; R. Addrisi; D. Addrisi	Mark Sparks	4:23
3.	"A Little of This"	M. Dixon; L. Mizell	Mark Sparks	4:23
4.	"Keep On"	M. Dixon; C. Liggio	Chris Liggio	5:04
5.	"Back Stabbers" (featuring Michelle Valdes Valentin)	M. Dixon	Mark Sparks	5:05
6.	"2000"	M. Dixon	Minnesota	3:25
7.	"Amazing"	M. Dixon; G. Johnson; L. Johnson; S. Garrett	Minnesota	4:02
8.	"Don't Waste My Time"	M. Dixon; K. Jones	DJ Alamo	4:28
9.	"Play It Cool"	M. Dixon; D. Murphy	Minnesota	4:12
10.	"Playin' the Game"	M. Dixon; K. Jones	DJ Alamo	3:08
11.	"Change Gonna Come"	M. Dixon; D. Ross	Dante Ross	4:32
Total length:				48:07

Notes

- Track 2 contains elements from "I Like It", written by Eldra Patrick DeBarge, William Randall DeBarge and Etterlene DeBarge, and performed by DeBarge; "I Wanna Be Where You Are", written by Eldra Patrick DeBarge, William Randall DeBarge, Etterlene DeBarge, Arthur "T-Boy" Ross and Leon Ware, and performed by DeBarge; "Never My Love", written by Donald Addrisi and Richard Addrisi, and performed by Cal Tjader
- Track 3 contains samples from "Just a Love Child", written by Larry Mizell and performed by Bobbi Humphrey
- Track 7 contains portions of "Tomorrow", written by George Johnson, Louis E. Johnson and Siedah Garrett, and performed by The Brothers Johnson
- Track 9 contains a sample of "I Can Deliver" as performed by Grady Tate

== Personnel ==
- Maxwell Dixon – vocals
- Michelle Valdes Valentin – vocals (tracks: 1, 5)
- Christopher P. Reid – backing vocals (track 3)
- Rick Posada – drum programming (track 6)
- Mark Sparks – producer (tracks: 1–3, 5)
- Mark Richardson – producer (tracks: 6, 7, 9)
- Keith Jones – producer (tracks: 8, 10)
- Chris Liggio – producer (track 4)
- Dante Ross – producer (track 11)
- John Kogan – engineering & mixing (tracks: 1, 9), recording (tracks: 8–10)
- Andy Blakelock – engineering & recording (tracks: 1, 3, 5), mixing (tracks: 3, 8, 10)
- Mike Scielzi – engineering & assistant recording (tracks: 1, 5), assistant mixing (track 3)
- Chris Barnett – engineering & mixing (track 2)
- Troy Hightower – engineering & recording (tracks: 2, 6, 9)
- Vance Wright – engineering & recording (tracks: 2, 3)
- Armen Mazlumian – engineering & assistant recording (track 2)
- Derrick Garrett – engineering (track 4)
- Jack Hersca – engineering & mixing (tracks: 5, 6, 11), recording (track 11)
- Jay Nicholas – engineering & assistant mixing (tracks: 5, 6)
- Joe Mendelson – engineering & recording (track 6)
- Kevin Thomas – engineering (track 7)
- Thomas Coyne – mastering
- Jennifer Roddie – design
- Jerome Lagarrigue – illustration
- Joshua Jordan – photography

== Charts ==
Chart (1995)	Peak position
US Billboard 200	48
US Top R&B/Hip-Hop Albums (Billboard)	5
