= Ten12 Records =

Brooklyn-based record label

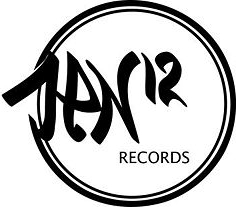
- Location: Brooklyn

Ten12 Records was a Brooklyn-based outsider electronic, breakbeat, and experimental record label. Ten12 was noted for its focus on facilitating collaboration between new experimental recording artists and the few remaining (and overlooked) early-stage funk and soul pioneers to foster unique recordings that identify the link and dialog between electronic, sample-based recordings and its analog origins. Ten 12's roots stretched back to the Mission District of San Francisco where, in 2000, Charles Lazar started the label in a friend's apartment at 1012 Capp Street. Formerly located in Brooklyn, Ten12 maintained its West Coast presence with operations in San Francisco, while developing a strong international presence, with operations in Japan, Australia, and the Netherlands.

Ten12 Records has released numerous artists to date, including the following:

- Skull Snaps
- The Audible Doctor
- Underdog
- Monk-One
- Steinski
- Unagi
- Discolobos
- Arecee
- Leslie & The Lys
- ten12 systems
- PaperCrossbow
- The Diplomats
