= DJ Shadow =

American DJ and record producer

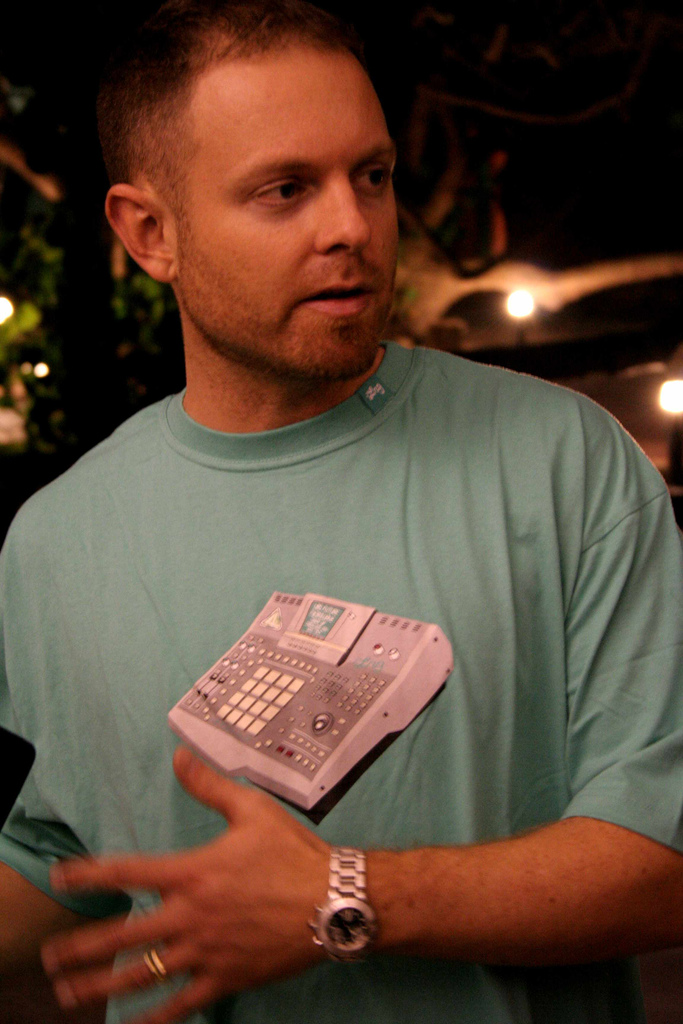
- Joshua Davis in October 2006

Background information
- Born: Joshua Paul Davis; June 29, 1972 (age 54); San Jose, California, U.S.
- Origin: Davis, California, U.S.
- Genres: Hip-hop; trip hop; electronic; turntablism; experimental
- Occupations: DJ; record producer
- Years active: 1989–present
- Labels: Mass Appeal; Mo' Wax; Quannum Projects; Solesides; MCA; Universal; Verve; Liquid Amber
- Formerly of: Unkle
- Website: www.djshadow.com

Joshua Paul Davis (born June 29, 1972), known professionally as DJ Shadow, is an American DJ and record producer. His debut studio album, Endtroducing....., was released in 1996. Davis uses layered production with numerous samples. From 1996 to 1999, he was also part of the band Unkle.

== Career ==
=== Early years (1989–1995) ===
DJ Shadow was experimenting with a four-track recorder while in high school in Davis, California, and began his music career as a disc jockey for the University of California, Davis, campus radio station KDVS. During this period, he explored the experimental hip-hop style associated with the London-based Mo' Wax record label. His early singles, including "In/Flux" and "Lost and Found (S.F.L.)", were genre-bending, merging elements of funk, rock, hip-hop, ambient, jazz, soul, and used-bin found records. Andy Pemberton, a music journalist writing for Mixmag, described the single "In/Flux" as "trip hop", a term that had already been attached to Bristol, England-based groups Massive Attack and Portishead and the Bristol scene in general in June 1994. He has cited Kurtis Mantronik, Steinski, and Prince Paul as influences on his sample-based sound, further claiming that "lyrics ... were confining, too specific". His music rarely features more than short clips of voices or vocal work.

Early in 1993, Shadow was a part of the creation of the Solesides underground hip-hop label, in conjunction with Blackalicious and Lyrics Born (whose stage name at the time was Asia Born). The first 12" release on this new imprint was titled "Entropy", with the A-side containing the Asia Born track "Send Them" and a dub rendition of the DJ Shadow track "Count and Estimate", and the entire B-side consisting of the 17-plus-minute title track. Rapper Gift of Gab is featured in the version of "Count and Estimate" that appears in Entropy. Shadow continued to participate in releases on the Solesides label for years to come, until the label was disbanded in favor of Quannum Projects.

Also in 1993, Mo' Wax's James Lavelle contacted Shadow about releasing "In/Flux" on the fledgling imprint. The association with Mo' Wax was a productive one; his tracks "In/Flux" and "Lost and Found" made their way onto some releases over the next few years. Shadow also worked with DJ Krush during this period. On a 1995 visit to the Mo' Wax Studios in London, England, Shadow was recruited to perform scratches on a Lavelle and Tim Goldsworthy mix of the Massive Attack song "Karmacoma".

=== Endtroducing....., UNKLE and Scratch (1996–2001) ===
Shadow's first full-length work, Endtroducing....., was released in late 1996 to critical acclaim. Endtroducing would go on to achieve the Guinness World Record for "First Completely Sampled Album" in 2001. The only pieces of equipment Shadow used to produce the album were the AKAI MPC60 II 12-bit sampling drum machine, a pair of turntables and a borrowed-by-visiting Pro Tools setup from an early adopter of the technology, Dan "The Automator" Nakamura. In November 2006, Time magazine named it one of its "All-Time" 100 best albums. In November 2014, automobile maker Chevrolet used a sample of "Building Steam with a Grain of Salt" in a Chevy commercial.

In 1998 Shadow released Preemptive Strike, a compilation of 1993–1997 singles released on Mo' Wax. Later that year, he produced Psyence Fiction, the debut album by UNKLE, a long-time Mo' Wax production team that featured guest appearances including Thom Yorke (Radiohead), Richard Ashcroft (The Verve), Mike D (Beastie Boys), Kool G. Rap, and Jason Newsted (Metallica).

Around 2000 he produced the score for the documentary Dark Days filmed by British director Marc Singer. This film is about a community of transients who live underground in a subway tunnel. It has six award wins in various competitions. Shadow also starred in the 2001 movie Scratch, produced by Doug Pray, alongside Z-Trip, Grand Wizard Theodore, Mix Master Mike and DJ Qbert. He makes multiple appearances during the turntable and digging sections of the movie.

=== The Private Press and Live! In Tune and on Time (2002–2005) ===
Nearly six years after his debut production album, his second album, The Private Press, was released in June 2002. A video for his track "Six Days" was also released in 2002, directed by Wong Kar-wai.

A remix of "Six Days" was also produced and released on The Fast and the Furious: Tokyo Drift soundtrack, featuring Mos Def.

In protest at the 2003 invasion of Iraq, DJ Shadow collaborated with Zack de la Rocha on the track "March of Death". The song was released online for free.

In 2004, Shadow's first feature-length DVD, Live! In Tune and on Time, was released. It features a live performance in London that combines tracks and samples from past albums as well as his work with UNKLE and Quannum, and emphasizes visuals, with the help of Bay Area projection artist Ben Stokes.

=== The Outsider and Diminishing Returns (2006–2009) ===
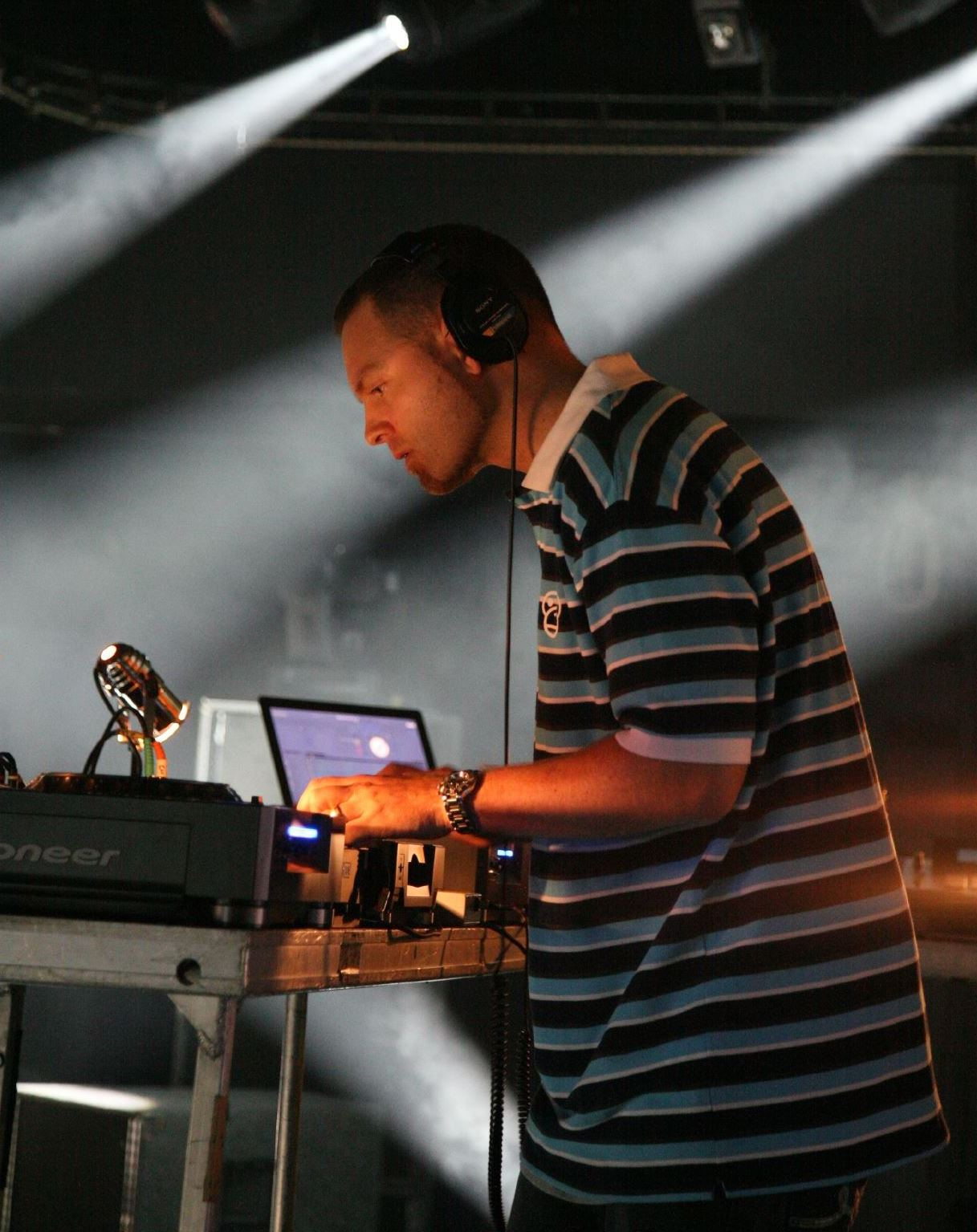
DJ Shadow in 2006

In 2006, he signed a deal with Universal Records, on which would be released The Outsider, on September 18. A special edition CD box set was also released containing The Outsider, the album on CD and a DVD entitled Tour Visuals. This album, which prominently featured several artists from the local San Francisco Bay Area hyphy hip-hop movement, got a mixed welcome among Shadow's fans. Responding to criticisms, the DJ/producer explained on his blog why he made no apologies: "Repeat Endtroducing over and over again? That was never, ever in the game plan. Fuck that. So I think it's time for certain fans to decide if they are fans of the album, or the artist."

Throughout 2007 and 2008, DJ Shadow toured with fellow DJ Cut Chemist in support of their The Hard Sell mixtape, released in January 2007 and recorded during the rehearsals of a June 2007 show. The duo had already produced several mixtapes in the past, including Brainfreeze and Product Placement, mixing jazz, funk, and soul. They were joined by Kid Koala, and the rehearsals of this tour spawned The Hard Sell (Encore), a "refined" version of the duo's set.

Diminishing Returns was a 2-hour DJ mix originally broadcast as an episode of the Essential Mix on BBC Radio 1 on March 29, 2003. It was released in 2003 on CD in a pressing limited to 1000 copies on the Reconstruction Productions label. On April 1, 2009, DJ Shadow announced on his Facebook page that he was working on a Diminishing Returns re-release. Reconstruction Productions reissued the album in 2009 with a sticker stating "official, last chance limited edition, re-release".

=== The Less You Know, the Better (2010–2013) ===
In September 2010, DJ Shadow released a single with two tracks called "Def Surrounds Us" and "I've Been Trying" and taken from the new album as a preview. While on the 2010 "Shadowsphere" tour new songs began to emerge, although he stated that a new album was not yet ready and that he would continue working toward having it ready in time for his 2011 tour.

On May 10, 2011, Shadow released an EP called I Gotta Rokk featuring remixed tracks from the forthcoming album, titled The Less You Know, the Better. A second single "I'm Excited" was also released, featuring Afrikan Boy, on July 7, 2011. However the single was pulled because of copyright infringement. The infringement also delayed the album's release. Another song from the album, titled "Warning Call", featuring Tom Vek, was released on September 7, 2011.

The artwork for this album, the associated singles and promotional material was done by Tony Papesh, an artist from San Francisco, California. The album was mixed by Jim Abbiss.

=== Liquid Amber (2014–2015) ===
On August 12, 2014, Shadow launched his new record label imprint Liquid Amber, releasing The Liquid Amber EP for streaming in accompaniment. Other acts signed to Liquid Amber include Bleep Bloop, Noer the Boy, Mophono, and Ruckazoid.

In April 2015, a group called Nite School Klik released a single called "Posse" on Liquid Amber. In May 2015, Shadow revealed to Billboard that the group was in fact himself and trap producer G Jones working together. The first self-titled EP by Nite School Klik was released on June 9, 2015.

=== The Mountain Will Fall and The Mountain Has Fallen (2016–2018) ===
In April 2016 Shadow announced a new album entitled The Mountain Will Fall, which was released on June 24 via Mass Appeal Records. A music video for the album's lead single, "Nobody Speak", featuring rap duo Run the Jewels, was released on August 24, 2016.

In collaboration with a Los Angeles record store, Shadow held on September 10 and 11, 2016, the "First Annual DJ Shadow Storage Sale", selling duplicates in his collection, and limited editions of his "The Sideshow" track. It has been an annual event since then and ran until 2019.

On April 20, 2017, a new collaboration between Shadow and Nas named "Systematic" premiered on Zane Lowe's Beats 1 radio show. The song was revealed to be part of HBO's Silicon Valley soundtrack. Later that year, in June, Shadow released the EP The Mountain Has Fallen, featuring "Systematic" and "Horror Show", a new single featuring Danny Brown. 2018 saw the release of Live in Manchester: The Mountain Has Fallen, a nine-track live album recorded at Manchester's Albert Hall on October 5, 2017, as Shadow was touring in support of his previous album and EP.

=== Our Pathetic Age (2019) ===
He later announced a double album entitled Our Pathetic Age that was released November 15, 2019. This two-part release includes an instrumental section and a vocal suite, featuring returning collaborators Run the Jewels and Nas, and artists such as Ghostface Killah, De La Soul, and Raekwon.

Shadow was approached by Deftones to contribute to their White Pony 20th anniversary re-issue remix project, Black Stallion. Singer Chino Moreno explained that they originally wanted him to remix the whole album, citing him as an inspiration at the time they recorded it. He ended up remixing "Digital Bath", alongside other confirmed producers such as Trevor Jackson and Clams Casino.

In January 2022, King Gizzard & the Lizard Wizard released a remix album titled Butterfly 3001. Shadow's "re-write" of "Black Hot Soup" was the first track on the album.

=== Action Adventure (2023) ===
In January 2023 DJ Shadow's seventh studio album Action Adventure was announced. Released in October 2023 the album was critically generally well received according to Metacritic. With no collaborations with other artists, the album marked a break from the previous two collaboration-heavy albums.

== Studio and equipment ==
The book Behind the Beat documents Shadow's home studio (named "Reconstruction") through photos and a brief description (as of 2005). It is "nestled within a leafy San Francisco suburb" and Shadow apparently moved to the area "to be closer to the local record store". He has a personal collection of more than 60,000 records, and "Shadow only keeps a small selection of vinyl at home with the rest occupying storage units around town". His equipment as of 2005, according to Behind the Beat, consists of two Akai MPC 3000s and a Korg Triton. His album Endtroducing was "created on an AKAI MPC60 II and an ADAT".

== Sampling ==
DJ Shadow's work involves manipulating samples, taking rare and seldom-heard pieces of music and reworking them into parts and phrases for his songs. Many of his tracks feature dozens of samples from a wide array of styles and influences, including rock, soul, funk, experimental, electronic and jazz. Shadow sampled American composer David Axelrod on his collaboration with DJ Krush, "Duality", sampling Axelrod's "The Warnings" (Part 1). The piano in "Midnight in a Perfect World" from 1996's Endtroducing was originally recorded for Pekka Pohjola's "Sekoilu seestyy". Although Shadow currently uses fewer samples than on his earlier albums, several examples feature on his 2006 album The Outsider. His collaboration with David Banner, "Seein' Thangs", features a synthesizer and vocals from Cecilia's "Crimson Red" and "Outsider Intro" includes an excerpt from Ron Geesin's "Concrete Line Up" from the 1973 album, As He Stands.

== Discography ==
=== Solo studio albums ===
- Endtroducing..... (1996)
- The Private Press (2002)
- The Outsider (2006)
- The Less You Know, the Better (2011)
- The Mountain Will Fall (2016)
- Our Pathetic Age (2019)
- Action Adventure (2023)

=== Unkle studio album ===
- Psyence Fiction (1998)

== Sources ==
- Arnold, Eric K. (September 13, 2006). "Out of the Shadow". SF Weekly. Archived from the original on September 30, 2007.
- Wilder, Eliot (2005). 33⅓ Endtroducing... London: Continuum. ISBN 0-8264-1682-9.
