= The Live Mix, Part 2 =

Studio album by Breakestra
- Released: February 20, 2001
- Genres: Funk, Soul, Hip Hop
- Label: Stones Throw Records
- Producer: This Kid Named Miles

Breakestra chronology
The Live Mix, Part 1 (1999)	The Live Mix, Part 2 (2001)	Hit The Floor (2005)

Professional ratings
Review scores
Source	Rating
Allmusic	link

The Live Mix, Part 2 is an album by Breakestra, an American ten-piece funk "orchestra". The album is a combination of breaks and funk covers performed with real instruments, and featuring the vocals of band member Mixmaster Wolf. All tracks were produced by This Kid Named Miles.

== Track listing ==
1. "Jagger the Dagger"
  - Contains a sample from:
    - "Jagger the Dagger" performed by Gene McDaniels
2. "Summer in the City"
  - Contains a sample from:
    - "Summer in the City" performed by Quincy Jones feat. Valerie Simpson
3. "Bubble Gum"
  - Contains a sample from:
    - "Bubble Gum" performed by The 9th Creation
4. "Crosswind"
  - Contains a sample from:
    - "Crosswind" performed by Billy Cobham
5. "Just Kissed My Baby"
  - Contains a sample from:
    - "Just Kissed My Baby" performed by The Meters
6. "Watermelon Man"
  - Contains a sample from:
    - "Watermelon Man" performed by Johnnie Taylor
7. "Space"
  - Contains a sample from:
    - "Space" performed by Galt MacDermot
8. "[It's Not the Express] It's The J.B.'s Monaurail"
  - Contains a sample from:
    - "[It's Not the Express] It's the J.B.'s Monaurail" performed by The J.B.'s
9. "T.L.C."
  - Contains a sample from:
    - "T.L.C." performed by Average White Band
10. "Funky Drummer"
  - Contains a sample from:
    - "Funky Drummer" performed by James Brown
11. "Crumbs Off The Table"
  - Contains a sample from:
    - "Crumbs Off The Table" performed by Laura Lee
12. "Sister Sanctified"
  - Contains a sample from:
    - "Sister Sanctified" performed by Stanley Turrentine
13. "Hook N' Sling"
  - Contains a sample from:
    - "Hook N' Sling" performed by Eddie Bo
14. "Sing A Simple Song"
  - Contains a sample from:
    - "Sing A Simple Song" performed by Sly & The Family Stone
15. "Sexy Coffee Pot"
  - Contains a sample from:
    - "Sexy Coffee Pot" performed by Tony Alvon & The Belairs
16. "I Got Love"
  - Contains a sample from:
    - "I Got Love" performed by Charles Wright & the Watts 103rd Street Rhythm Band
17. "Baby Don't Cry"
  - Contains a sample from:
    - "Baby Don't Cry" performed by Third Guitar
18. "Inner City Blues"
  - Contains a sample from:
    - "Inner City Blues" performed by Reuben Wilson
19. "Cramp Your Style"
  - Contains a sample from:
    - "Cramp Your Style" performed by All The People
20. "Champ"
  - Contains a sample from:
    - "Champ" performed by the Mohawks
21. "Hot Pants, I'm Comin'"
  - Contains a sample from:
    - "Hot Pants, I'm Comin'" performed by Bobby Byrd
22. "Sad Chicken"
  - Contains a sample from:
    - "Sad Chicken" performed by Leroy & The Drivers
23. "Remember Who You Are"
  - Contains a sample from:
    - "Remember Who You Are" performed by Sly & The Family Stone
24. "Humpty Dump"
  - Contains a sample from:
    - "Humpty Dump" performed by Vibrettes
25. "Burning Spear"
  - Contains a sample from:
    - "Burning Spear" performed by S.O.U.L.
26. "Showbiz Interlude"
27. "Soul Power '74"
  - Contains a sample from:
    - "Soul Power '74" performed by Maceo & The Macks
28. "Getcho Soul Together, Pt. 1"
29. "Getcho Soul Together, Pt. 2"

== Credits ==
- Drums: Josh Cohen
- Flute: Double G
- Alto saxophone: Double G
- Tenor saxophone: Double G
- Baritone saxophone: Double G
- Organ: Carlos Guaico
- Fender rhodes: Carlos Guaico
- Bass: Miles Om Tackett
- Violin: Miles Om Tackett, Amir Yaghmai
- Cello: Miles Om Tackett, Amir Yaghmai
- Guitar: Dan Ubick
- Mixing: Miles Om Tackett

== Reception ==
Ron Hart of Billboard gave the album a positive review, saying "As good as it may be, 'Live Mix' is no substitute for the originals. But if you're in search of the best driving music of 2001, peep no further than this right here." Stanton Swihart of Allmusic gave the album 4 stars, saying the album was "A bit rough in spots, but no matter -- funk is supposed to be messy. And this album is funk to the bone."
