= Check It Out (Grand Puba song) =

1992 single by Grand Puba featuring Mary J. Blige

Single by Grand Puba featuring Mary J. Blige

from the album Reel to Reel
- Released: December 4, 1992
- Recorded: 1991–1992
- Studio: Power Play (Long Island City); Chung King House of Metal (New York); The Hit Factory (New York)
- Genre: Hip-hop
- Length: 3:32
- Label: Elektra
- Songwriters: Maxwell Dixon; Roy Hammond
- Producer: Grand Puba

Grand Puba singles chronology
"360 Degrees (What Goes Around)" (1992)	"Check It Out" (1992)	"Ya Know How It Goes" (1993)

Mary J. Blige singles chronology
"Reminisce" (1992)	"Check It Out" (1992)	"Dolly My Baby" (1993)

Music video
- "Check It Out" on YouTube

"Check It Out" is a song by American rapper Grand Puba, released as the second single from his debut studio album Reel to Reel (1992) on December 4, 1992. It features vocals from American singer Mary J. Blige. The song contains samples of "Yes, I'm Ready" by Barbara Mason, "Let Me Come on Home" by Otis Redding, "Impeach the President" by the Honey Drippers and "I'm Every Woman" by Chaka Khan.

== Critical reception ==
Louis "ATCO" Romain of The Source described the song as Grand Puba "catchin' wreck with Mary J. Blige and hittin' the soul over the immortal 'Honeydrippers' beat", additionally commenting "Expect to hear that one well into next year." Steve "Flash" Juon of RapReviews praised Puba's "charm" on the song and Mary J. Blige's performance, writing "She seems naturally comfortable going back and forth with Maxwell, unintentionally setting a standard for the 90's that Blige was THE hip-hop R&B artist you could trust to get it and respect rap records."

== Charts ==
Chart (1993)	Peak position
US Bubbling Under Hot 100 (Billboard)	10
US Hot R&B/Hip-Hop Songs (Billboard)	85
US Hot Rap Songs (Billboard)	13
