= Fresh Mode =

EP by Ugly Duckling
- Released: April 20, 1999
- Genre: Hip-hop
- Length: 27:26
- Label: 1500/A&M/Interscope/Universal Records; 541 028
- Producer: Young Einstein

Ugly Duckling chronology
Fresh Mode (1999)	Journey to Anywhere (2001)

Professional ratings
Review scores
Source	Rating
AllMusic	3/5 stars

Fresh Mode is the first release by Long Beach hip-hop group Ugly Duckling. It was released by 1500 Records.

== Track listing ==
1. "Fresh Mode" - 3:47
2. "Now Who's Laughin'" - 2:59
3. "Get On This" - 3:59
4. "Einstein's Takin' Off" - 3:19
5. "Everybody C'mon" - 3:20
6. "Do You Know What I'm Sayin'" - 2:40
7. "Everything's All Right" - 3:44
8. "We're Here" - 3:38
