= Hard sell =

Type of advertisement

In advertising, a hard sell is an advertisement or campaign that uses a more direct, forceful, and overt sales message, as opposed to a soft sell.

The term is also used to describe aggressive sales techniques used by company representatives, particularly in the context of doorstep selling.

== Overview ==
The concepts that distinguish a hard sell from a soft sell have to do with directness of an advertiser or seller, rational appeal, and the amount of information given to the buyer about a product. A hard sell is extremely direct in nature. An advertisement will contain a forceful, loud slogan to grab buyers' attention, or a salesperson will be very persistent, cornering their buyer into purchasing the product they are selling. In a hard sell, the advertisement or seller will focus heavily on the quality of the product and explain how purchasing such a product will be a rational decision that will help improve the buyer's life. This type of selling supplies an abundance of information to the buyer so they receive as much information about the benefits of the product as possible. The advertisement or seller uses such tactics to overwhelm the buyer with explanations, information, and persistence to ultimately create an incentive to purchase the good or service.

A soft sell is much more emotionally focused when put in comparison to a hard sell. An advertisement or seller will attempt to trigger feelings in the buyer that will make them want to buy the product that is being advertised. This selling technique is also much more indirect in nature than that of a hard sell. The subtlety of a soft sell is very evident, and many buyers often do not realize that they are being purposely directed in such a way to buy a product how a seller predicts that they will. The ultimate goal of this type of selling is to create a mood or image that will appeal to the buyer and make them want to spend their money on a product, all without the buyer realizing that this is occurring. Persistence is not as involved in a soft sell as it is in a hard sell.

== Principles used ==
=== Numbers game ===
A very large volume is needed to run hard sell. Even with small probabilities of success, enough sales can be achieved by attempting conversion on large customer bases to sustain the operation or even generate profits. This is especially useful when selling recurring purchases, such as subscriptions, warranty, or MLM products, because one sale will lead to recurring purchases.

=== Emotional triggers ===
Most purchases are analytical decisions, and hence, require time to collect data about comparable products, make comparisons to fit individual needs and find budget to finalize a purchase. Hard sell attempts to bypass all that by using emotional triggers, such as appealing to personal aspirations, creating artificial scarcity, applying compliance principles, and exploiting cognitive biases or fallacies.

=== Information asymmetry ===
Hard sell leverages information asymmetry, such as by avoiding comparisons with competitors, by delaying disclosures, by deflecting customer questions for clarity or information, or by limiting access to resources such as time (to decide), internet, or friends' feedback (e.g. by running only in-person sales). Such information asymmetry is used as a leverage to make the sale seem more appealing than it actually is. For example, presenting shopper with a high-interest loan disguised as a payment plan to finance larger purchases, salesperson not disclosing the final charge at checkout, or not mentioning the no refund or exchanges final-sale policy to the shopper.

=== Targeting ===
Some segments of the population are especially susceptible to hard selling, such as elderly people, unemployed, students, and minority groups. For example, according to an NPR investigation, stores that sell skin care products from the Mazal Group have taken the walker of a woman with disability and refused to let her leave until she spent a certain amount of money.

== Advantages ==
The advantage of immediacy plays a large role in the concept of a hard sell and why so many advertisements and salespeople use this type of technique. Because this type of sell is so direct and blatant in nature, the person will most likely buy the product on the spot. A perfect example of this are mail order ads, where readers are urged to fill out a coupon right away. In opposition, a soft sell ad, because of its indirectness and subtlety, will allow for a person to have more time to make a decision as to whether or not they would like to invest their money in a product. A prime example of this type of sell would be life insurance advertisements where emotional appeals of family and security are mentioned. Persons are put in a less pressured environment, allowing them to contemplate their decision on whether or not to buy a product. Immediacy is more evident in a hard sell.

== Disadvantages ==
A hard sell may alienate some customers, who find it off-putting. Sometimes the pressuring nature that comes along with hard sell tactics can overwhelm a person to the point where they dismiss the sales pitch or turn away from the advertisement altogether. Emotional appeal is more involved in a soft sell and with the absence of this in a hard sell, business can be lost if persons do not respond well to the tactics, especially when times are hard. During the Great Depression, soft sell tactics, like brand relationship and humor, proved successful approaches. People's inability to spend on luxuries required some wooing for a sale. More direct hard sell tactics pushed away already stressed, calloused-minded persons during this time period of economic hardship.

In addition, a hard sell generates much more buyer's remorse, because the customer did not get enough opportunity or information before sale to balance the value provided with the cost of the purchase. In extreme situations, buyers may feel cheated or even scammed.

There is also criticism of hard sell tactics in regards to lack of creativity on the part of advertisements and sellers, which causes the would-be customer to never acquire intrigue towards the product being sold.

== Comparison with soft sells ==
The frequency with which either a hard sell or a soft sell is used is dependent upon the intent of its use—the goal of advertising agencies or salespeople. There are times where hard sells are the more rational choice for a sale, and where soft sells are required.

A hard sell is usually used when a seller wants their potential customer to do something soon—to make a call, to sign up for a subscription, or to buy a product in person on the spot. Sharpness and urgency is key in these situations to successfully make a sale. These tactics do not involve personable qualities or emotional appeal.

When situations change, a soft sell is used to help promote a brand and make the product likable in the eyes of a potential customer. Warmth and desire towards a brand induces a connection between the product and the individual, rather than action on the product by the person. Immediacy and urgent buying is not involved in a soft sell, but long-term value and loyalty to a brand can be established.

== See also ==
- Hard Sell (TV series)
- Hard Sell (2016 film)
- Soft sell
- Closing (sales)
