= The Leftovers (EP) =

The Leftovers EP

EP by Ugly Duckling
- Released: 2003
- Genre: Hip-hop
- Length: 28:55
- Label: Earshot

Ugly Duckling chronology
| Taste the Secret (2003) | The Leftovers EP (2003) | Bang for the Buck (2006) |

The Leftovers EP is the hip-hop group Ugly Duckling's second EP. Released shortly after the second album, Taste the Secret, this EP completes the story followed in that album. It explains what happens to Meat Shack and its employees after the events of Taste the Secret, culminating in the three employees mentioned in the album being fired and deciding to create a hip-hop group called Ugly Duckling.

Although originally released as a separate release, The Leftovers EP was later packaged together with Taste the Secret and released in 2004 as Combo Meal: Taste the Secret/The Leftovers EP on the Emperor Norton/Rykodisc record label.

== Track listing ==
1. "Get Ready" - 3:25
2. "Something's Going Down Tonight" - 4:17
3. "Almond Rocha" - 3:08
4. "Celebrity" - 3:54
5. "Ring the Bell" - 4:05
6. "Einstein's Brazilian Travelogue" - 2:43
7. "Turn It Up (Refried)" - 3:32
8. "Elevator Music" - 3:54
