= Bang for the Buck =

Studio album by Ugly Duckling
- Released: April 11, 2006
- Genres: Alternative hip-hop, jazz rap
- Length: 43:40
- Label: Fat Beats Records
- Producer: Young Einstein

Ugly Duckling chronology
The Leftovers (2003)	Bang for the Buck (2006)	Audacity (2009)

Professional ratings
Review scores
Source	Rating
AllMusic	4/5 stars
HipHopDx	4/5
RapReviews	8.5/10

Bang for the Buck is a studio album by Long Beach hip-hop group Ugly Duckling. "Smack" was featured in Tony Hawk's Project 8.

== Track listing ==
1. "Bang for the Buck" - 3:08
2. "Yudee!" - 3:56
3. "The Breakdown" - 3:28
4. "Left Behind" - 3:33
5. "Smack" - 3:56
6. "Einstein's on Stage" - 3:18
7. "Let It Out" - 3:36
8. "Lower the Boom" - 3:46
9. "Andy vs. Dizzy" - 2:20
10. "Slow the Flow" - 4:04
11. "Shoot Your Shot" (featuring People Under the Stairs) - 4:22
12. "The End of Time" - 4:17
13. "Soul for Sale" - 3:23

== Samples ==
"The Breakdown" samples "Organ Mania," by Alan Hawkshaw.
