= 360 Degrees (What Goes Around) =

"360° (What Goes Around)"

Single by Grand Puba

from the album Reel to Reel
- Released: July 16, 1992
- Recorded: 1991–1992
- Studio: Power Play (Long Island City); Chung King House of Metal (New York); The Hit Factory (New York)
- Genre: Hip hop
- Length: 4:01
- Label: Elektra
- Songwriter: Maxwell Dixon
- Producer: Grand Puba

Grand Puba singles chronology
"360° (What Goes Around)" (1992)	"Check It Out" (1992)

Music video
- "360 (What Goes Around)" on YouTube

"360° (What Goes Around)" is a song written, performed and produced by American rapper Grand Puba. It was released on July 16, 1992, through Elektra Records as the lead single from his debut studio album, Reel to Reel (1992). The song features a vocal sample of "What Goes Around (Gonna Come Back Again)" by Gladys Knight & the Pips. A remix version of the song was made by the Stimulated Dummies and also included in the album as a bonus track.

The single peaked at No. 68 and 88 on the US Billboard Hot 100 and Cash Box Top 100 charts. It also reached No. 30 on the Hot R&B/Hip-Hop Songs, No. 62 on the R&B/Hip-Hop Airplay, No. 1 on the Hot Rap Songs, No. 16 on the Hot R&B/Hip-Hop Singles Sales and No. 21 on the Dance Singles Sales charts.

== Critical reception ==
Reviewing Reel to Reel for AllMusic, Stanton Swihart commented "the album really does have a lot to offer, including the irresistible one-two punch of 'Check Tha Resume' and '360°'". Steve "Flash" Juon of RapReviews lauded Grand Puba for not using the song to diss his former bandmates from Brand Nubian.

== Track listing ==
All tracks are written by Maxwell "Grand Puba" Dixon.

No.	Title	Producer(s)	Length
1.	"360° (What Goes Around)" (Vocal)	Grand Puba	4:01
2.	"360° (What Goes Around)" (SD50 Remix)	Grand Puba	4:01
3.	"360° (What Goes Around)" (Instrumental)	Grand Puba	4:01
4.	"360° (What Goes Around)" (Remix Instrumental)	Grand Puba	4:01

== Personnel ==
- Maxwell "Grand Puba" Dixon – lyrics, rap vocals, producer
- Anton Pukshansky – bass, engineering
- Dante Ross – re-mixing (tracks: 2, 4)
- John Gamble – re-mixing (tracks: 2, 4)
- Geeby Dajani – re-mixing (tracks: 2, 4)
- Herb "Pump" Powers – mastering

== Charts ==
Chart (1992)	Peak position
US Billboard Hot 100	68
US Hot R&B/Hip-Hop Songs (Billboard)	30
US R&B/Hip-Hop Airplay (Billboard)	62
US Hot Rap Songs (Billboard)	1
US Cash Box Top 100	88
