= Brainfreeze (album) =

Mixtape by Cut Chemist & DJ Shadow
- Released: 1999
- Recorded: 1998
- Genre: Soul; funk; turntablism; sound collage; sampledelia
- Length: 52:11
- Label: Sixty 7
- Producer: DJ Shadow & Cut Chemist

DJ Shadow & Cut Chemist chronology
Brainfreeze (1999)	Product Placement (2001)

Brainfreeze is the debut collaborative live DJ mix album by American producers DJ Shadow and Cut Chemist, released "sometime" in 1999. The two tracks of the album are uninterrupted recordings from a live performance where they sampled hit funk, soul, rock and jazz singles from 45 rpm vinyl records. This type of recording was pioneered by the duo Double Dee and Steinski through their "Lessons" (the difference being that the "Lessons" cuts were meticulously edited together from snippets of audio tape, rather than performed live using turntables).

== History ==
Brainfreeze was recorded by DJ Shadow and Cut Chemist as a practice session for a show in February 1999 at the Future Primitive Soundsession in San Francisco, mixing funk and soul 45's. Initially 1000 copies were made and sold at the shows, and a further 1000 copies were made and distributed to local records stores in California and sold out very quickly. A cease-and-desist letter from 7-Eleven convenience stores—the whole artwork and styling was based on their logos and uniforms—meant that they stopped and moved on. The album was then bootlegged and it can now be found in popular record shops.

DJ Shadow and Cut Chemist toured their Brainfreeze performance initially as part of Shadow's International Goodwill Tour in 1999, on January 18, 2000, they reunited to perform a farewell to the Brainfreeze shows at the El Rey Theatre in Los Angeles. This final show was later released on VHS as Freeze, and includes footage of rehearsals as well.

This set was reenacted at the Mayan night club in Los Angeles on May 25, 2006, as part of a benefit concert for DJ Shadow's art director, Keith Tamashiro, in order to offset costs related to a brain aneurysm he suffered early in 2006.

Brainfreeze was followed up by Product Placement, an album of similar content and style.

== Comments ==
While there was no tracklisting given except for some record shots in the inner sleeves, Michael "DOP" Lane put together listing of the tracks and this has been adapted in reviews and website listings. While this has been repeatedly bootlegged, the main difference between the original pressing and the bootlegs are the quality of the sleeves and the CD (colors look washed out and not as sharp on the bootleg). The original CD on the inner ring has ©1999 Sixty7 Recordings written in red on a clear background. The bootleg does not have a clear bit. On the back of the CD is Disc Producers inc 2886/Brainfreeze ADC/CA. Some bootlegs have "Slurp CD 001" and a bar code written on them.

The 45s used in the Brainfreeze mix are highly sought after by vinyl collectors, and the term "Brainfreeze" in online auctions often results in increased auction prices for these records. The songs have been collected on compilations called Slurped, and Brainfreeze Breaks, which feature the songs in unmixed form.

== Reception ==
Professional ratings
Review scores
Source	Rating
AllMusic	4.5/5 stars

Stanton Swihart of AllMusic stated that "Brainfreeze transforms the mix tape into a genuine piece of musical art, a sampladelic, turntablist collage that may be the apotheosis of – or at least a turning point for – the genre." Describing the record as "an amazing display of spontaneous music-making", he concluded that "it is a dizzyingly brilliant, virtuoso work of two exceedingly fecund imaginations." In Spin Will Hermes called Brainfreeze "inspired garage mechanics" and that the pair "get extra-busy just to showcase their micromanagement skills". Reviewing the duo's 2001 follow-up album Product Placement, Rob Mitchum of Pitchfork described Brainfreeze as "much admired" and said that DJ Shadow and Cut Chemist had "sculpted a mixtape symphony that withstood repeated listens".

== Songs used ==
=== Mix one ===
- Lamont Johnson Quartet - "Thunder Kick" (trailer to unreleased film)
- The Jules Blattner Group - "2001 - A Soul Odyssey"
- Fried Chicken - "Funky DJ"
- The Mohawks - "The Champ"
- Reuben Bell - "Superjock"
- Albert King - "Cold Feet"
- Ultimate Force - "I'm Not Playing"
- Eddie Bo and Inez Cheatham - "Lover and a Friend"
- Mack Rice - "Three People In Love"
- The Nu People - "I'd Be Nowhere Today"
- Nu-Sound Express Ltd - "Ain't It Good Enough"
- Mystic Moods - "Cosmic Sea"
- American Gypsy - "Inside Out"
- Odetta - "Hit or Miss"
- The Mar-Keys - "Grab This Thing (Part 2)"
- Rusty Bryant - "FireEater"
- Simtec and Wylie - "Bootleggin' (Part 2)"
- Wilbur Bascomb and the Zodiac - "Just a Groove In 'G'"
- Eddie Bo and The Soul Finders - "We're Doin' It (Thang) (Part 2)"
- Rufus Thomas - "Sophisticated Sissy"
- The Showmen Inc. - "The Tramp (from Funky Broadway) (Part 1)"
- The Original Soul Senders - "Soul Brother Testify (Part 2)"
- Rufus Thomas - "Itch and Scratch (Part I and II)"
- Alvin Cash - "Keep On Dancing (Instrumental)"
- Lou Courtney - "Hey Joyce"
- Bummer radio spot

=== Mix two ===
- The Singing Principal - "Women's Lib"
- Salt - "Hung Up"
- The Soul Lifters - "Hot, Funky, and Sweaty"
- Frankie Seay and The Soul Riders - "Soul Food"
- The Interpretations - "Jason Pew Mosso (Part 1)"
- Thunder and Lightning - "Bumpin' Bus Stop"
- Billy Garner - "I Got Some"
- Pleasure Web - "Music Man (Part I and II)"
- Gary Byrd - "Soul Travelin' (The G.B.E.)" (Part I)
- Clifton Chenier and Grandma Gee Gee - "Just Keep On Scratching"
- "W" radio spot
- Marlena Shaw - "California Soul"
- The Vibrettes- "Humpty Dump (Part 1)"
- Eddie Bo - "From This Day On"
- 7-Eleven - "Dance the Slurp"
- Kraftwerk - "Numbers"
- Flash and The Five - "Flash It to the Beat"
- Pearly Queen - "Quit Jivin'"
- Tony Alvon and The Belairs - "Sexy Coffee Pot"
- Chuck Mangione - "Hill Where the Lord Hides"
- Funka Fize - "No Words"
- Schooly D - "Gucci Time"
- Jurassic 5 - "Unified Rebelution" (a cappella)
- Third Guitar - "Baby Don't Cry"
- Don Pierce - "This Funky Thing"
- Funka Fize - "Because You're Funky"
- The Troubleneck Brothers - "Back to the Hip Hop"
- Stu Gardner - "Devil in a Man"
- Samson and Delilah - "There's a DJ in Your Town"
- Giorgio Moroder - "Tears"
- Tim and Bill - "Someone"
