= Taste the Secret =

Studio album by Ugly Duckling
- Released: June 16, 2003
- Genre: Hip-hop
- Length: 69:35
- Labels: Emperor Norton/Rykodisc Records; ENR 7065
- Producer: Ugly Duckling

Ugly Duckling chronology
Journey to Anywhere (2001)	Taste the Secret (2003)	The Leftovers EP (2003)

Professional ratings
Review scores
Source	Rating
AllMusic	link
RapReviews.com	link
Rolling Stone	link
The Village Voice	Positive link
SF Weekly	Negative link

Taste the Secret is the second studio album by the southern Californian hip-hop trio Ugly Duckling, released on June 16, 2003, by Emperor Norton Records. For the album, Ugly Duckling developed a fictitious fast food chain called "Meatshake" that served only meat-based food served in shake form. A web site featuring the restaurant chain was also developed as part of the album's marketing campaign.

== Track listing ==
#	Title	Time
1	"Opening Act"	3:57
2	"Turn It Up"	3:59
3	"Meatshake"	2:43
4	"Dumb It Down"	3:36
5	"Abigail Silk"	3:29
6	"Energy Drink"	3:15
7	"The Drive-Thru"	2:23
8	"Mr. Tough Guy"	4:05
9	"Pass It On"	4:06
10	"Veggie-Hut"	2:31
11	"La Revolución"	5:17
12	"Potty-Mouth"	4:16
13	"Daisy"	3:43
14	"The Confrontation"	2:43
15	"Rio de Janeiro"	3:25
16	"I Wanna Go Home"	4:22
17	"Goodnight, Now"	4:00
18	"Something’s Going down Tonight" (featuring Grand Puba)	4:19
19	"Turn It Up (Refried)"	7:25

== MeatShake ==
"MeatShake," a fictitious chain of restaurants offering meat-based thick shakes, was created as a promotional gimmick for the release. As a concept album, it was about working at a fast-food chain and its inter-business war with Veggie Hut, an all-vegetarian fast-food stand.

When it was operational, MeatShake's web site appeared to be a fully functional site promoting a small Long Beach-area-based fast food restaurant, whose corporate mission was meat—and lots of it—served in the form of milkshakes. The site also had a list of restaurants (the addresses of which were area McDonald's restaurants), employees of the month, and storefront pictures (one of which appeared to be an In-N-Out Burger). The site is no longer maintained.
