= The Hard Sell (Encore) =

Live album by DJ Shadow & Cut Chemist
- Released: 2008
- Genre: Hip-hop
- Length: 78:51
- Label: Pillage Roadshow
- Producer: DJ Shadow & Cut Chemist

DJ Shadow & Cut Chemist chronology
The Hard Sell (2007)	The Hard Sell (Encore) (2008)

Professional ratings
Review scores
Source	Rating
Metroactive	(not rated) link

The Hard Sell (Encore) is an album by DJ Shadow and Cut Chemist. It was released in 2008. The entire mix performed live and recorded during rehearsals for the Hard Sell tour, November 2007, at the pink house.

== Track listing ==
1. "On a Mission" - 5:19
2. "Jukebox Rock" - 7:36
3. "Funky" - 6:57
4. "Chilled" - 6:53
5. "Sun Used to Shine" - 3:10
6. "Fused of Course" - 17:28
7. "Toro Toro" - 2:56
8. "Hooked on Atari" - 23:48
9. "Turned Around and Time Warped" - 4:48

== Production ==
DJ Shadow and Cut Chemist used 8 turntables, 4 mixers, 2 guitar pedals, and a large quantity of 7-inch vinyl.

== Samples ==
Jukebox Rock

- "Rock Around the Clock" by Telex
- "Eye of the Tiger" by Big Daddy

Funky

- "Passin' Me By" by The Pharcyde
- "Apache" by Incredible Bongo Band
- "It's a New Day" by Skull Snaps

Chilled

- "Father Figure" by George Michael
- "En Focus" by De La Soul
- "Try Again" by Aaliyah
- "Jimmi Diggin Cats" by Digable Planets
- "Mistadobalina" by Del tha Funkee Homosapien

Sun Used to Shine

- "Synthetic Substitution" by Melvin Bliss
- "Magic Mountain" by War on Love Is All Around

Fused of Course

- Smash Hits Interview flexi disc with Spandau Ballet
- Spoken words by Robert Plant
- "Soupy" by Maggie Thrett
- "We Will Rock You" by Queen

Toro Toro

Hooked on Atari

- "When I Hear Music" by Debbie Deb
- "I Never Scared" by Bonecrusher
- "The Way You Move" by OutKast
- "Everlong" by The Foo Fighters
- "Somebody To Love" by Jefferson Airplane
- "Break on Through (To the Other Side)" by The Doors
- "Whoa, Back, Buck!" by Dave Plaehn
- "Space Invaders" by Player One
- "Hater" by Various Production

Turned Around And Time Warped

- "A Few More Kisses To Go" by Isaac Hayes
