= Double Dee and Steinski =

American hip hop producer duo

- Origin: United States
- Genres: Hip hop, mashup, dance
- Years active: 1983–present Various reunions (1998, 2002, 2006)
- Labels: Tommy Boy/Warner Bros. Records (1983-1986); 4th & B'way/Island/PolyGram Records (1986–1988)
- Members: Doug "Double Dee" DiFranco; Steven "Steinski" Stein

Double Dee and Steinski are a duo of hip hop producers, composed of Doug "Double Dee" DiFranco and Steven "Steinski" Stein. They achieved notoriety in the early 1980s for a series of underground hip-hop sample-based collages known as the "Lessons".

Although they never had a hit record, they proved highly influential for subsequent artists such as Coldcut, DJ Shadow, Cut Chemist, the Avalanches, and Girl Talk. Their music was not widely available on CD until 2008 due to their use of copyrighted material. There have been occasional illegal re-issues, and several internet sites have mp3s of their music available for download.

== History ==
In 1983, Tommy Boy Records held a promotional contest, in which entrants were asked to remix the single "Play That Beat, Mr. D.J." by G.L.O.B.E. and Whiz Kid. By day, DiFranco worked in a professional music studio, while Stein was a copy supervisor for Doyle Dane Bernbach. Although the two were older (27 and 31, respectively) than most of their peers in the hip-hop community, they were both enthusiasts of the genre; Stein, in particular, had been attending downtown rap clubs for years and had an extensive knowledge of hip-hop's history. Although early hip-hop records did not appear until 1979, DJing was a phenomenon that had been around since 1973. Stein claimed to draw inspiration from the Dickie Goodman records of the 1950s, which edited together pop songs and comedic commentary.

Their contest entry, "Lesson 1 – The Payoff Mix", was packed with sampled appropriations from other records—not only from early hip-hop records and from Funk and Disco records that were popular with hip-hop DJs, but with short snippets of older songs by Little Richard and The Supremes, along with vocal samples from sources as diverse as instructional tap-dancing records and Humphrey Bogart films. The record was pieced together in DiFranco's studio in 12–14 hours over two days and was critically praised. The jury, which included Afrika Bambaataa, Shep Pettibone, and "Jellybean" Benitez awarded "Lesson 1" the first prize.

DiFranco and Stein followed up this success with the track "Lesson 2 — The James Brown Mix" in 1984, which began with a sample from The War of the Worlds before quickly running through a montage of memorable breaks from classic James Brown records, as well as various other samples. Also that year, DiFranco teamed up with David Witz, a CBS Records producer who recorded as Arthur Ether, to create "Taste So Good", which they released under the name File 13. "Taste So Good" was built from snippets of recorded sex-phone calls over an original instrumental bed, and while too racy for radio in 1984, the 12-inch single found success in nightclubs and reached #38 on the Billboard Dance/Disco Top 80 on the chart week of October 6, 1984.

In 1985, the track "Lesson 3 — The History of Hip-Hop Mix", attempted a survey of the great breakdancing favorites, along with snippets from The Tonight Show Starring Johnny Carson and Archie Bleyer's version of the song "Hernando's Hideaway". Later in 1985, the group's first album, Lessons 1-3, was released, containing all three "Lessons". The track "We'll Be Right Back" was released in 1986 on Fourth & Broadway under the name Steinski and Mass Media. As the title indicated, the track was dominated by samples from TV and radio adverts from the 1950s and 1960s. The single reached number 63 on the UK charts.

In 1987, "The Motorcade Sped On" was released, which utilised snippets of newscasts, mainly of Walter Cronkite, about the assassination of John F. Kennedy and associated events over a drum track sampled from the Rolling Stones' "Honky Tonk Women." In the United Kingdom, the NME included the track on a giveway 7-inch EP record. In 1988 "Let's Play It Cool" was released on Fourth & Broadway.

=== Recent years ===
Although DiFranco currently pursues a career in sound design for television, Stein has remained active in the music genre in recent years, doing occasional remix work and longer old-school mixes, as well as DJing regularly in Europe and the UK using a laptop and midi gear. The pair reunited in 1998 to remix Afrika Bambaataa's "Jazzy Sensation", in 2002 for a live performance at the Roseland Ballroom in New York opening for DJ Shadow, May 2006 opening for Coldcut at Irving Plaza, August 2007 opening for Negativland at the Highline Ballroom, and January 2008 opening for Dj Shadow and Cut Chemist at Irving Plaza for 2 nights. Stein is interviewed in the 2001 documentary Scratch.

In 2002, all three of the original "Lessons" were re-released on vinyl, as well as for the first time on CD, on a collection entitled Ultimate Lessons. This compilation also featured Cut Chemist's Lesson 4, as well as several live collaborations featuring Shadow, Cut Chemist, Steinski himself, and Shortkut. Although it was widely available at the time shortly after its release it can be difficult to track down today; this is most likely a bootleg or unlicensed recording due to the dozens of uncleared samples. It is common practice for such releases to be printed in small numbers to avoid the unwanted legal attention of the copyright holders.

Two more compilations soon followed, and although these sequels contained few, if any, contributions from DiFranco and Stein themselves, they follow the same tradition of sample-heavy dance-collages reminiscent of old school hip hop. Some of the more well-known artists to appear on Ultimate Lessons 2 and Ultimate Lessons 3 include Coldcut, DJ Nu-Mark, Kid Koala, DJ Red Alert, and Fatboy Slim. In 2007, Stein released a track on ten12 records to revisit the Skull Snaps drum break, one of the most sampled beats in history, on the It's A New Redux project.

Stein's radio show A Rough Mix went back on the air between June 7 and October 4, 2007, on WFMU 91.1FM in the New York-New Jersey metro area. In 2008, Lesson 1 - The Payoff Mix was officially issued on CD by Illegal Art Records on a compilation of Stein's work entitled What Does It All Mean? 1983-2006 Retrospective, which Spin Magazine listed as the #1 reissue of 2008. The collection also received a rating of 8.7 from Pitchfork, and 4 stars from Rolling Stone.

Steinski's 2006 compilation CD What Does it all Mean? contained a new track - "Number 3 on Flight 11", a meditation on the 9/11 terrorist attacks - which has been widely praised. In their reviews of What Does it all Mean, Peter Shapiro (Wire magazine, June 2008) called the piece "a graceful (but still chilling) elegy to New York," while Dean Biron (Popular Music and Society, 2009) referred to it as "one of the most remarkable pieces of music of this or any year ... [which] manages the impossible feat of evoking hope, beauty, sadness and dread all in the one text."

In 2015 they released a 12-minute mix called "The Insanity Clause" which was first available through their SoundCloud page. In 2016 they began working again on "Lesson 4", which they had originally started together in 1988. Double Dee also released his first solo track called "Realm Of The Jezebel Spirit" to their SoundCloud page. Steinski released a series of solo tracks as well on his SoundCloud page, including: "Howard Zinn reads Mark Twain On Loyalty", "prosody sketch #1 'The Action'", "prosody sketch #2 'Mouth To Mouth'", "Steinski's space/time mix", "The Optimize Gospels, From The Book Of Maximization", "LSD Is The Bomb (I'm Just Sayin')". Steinski also released a series of tracks influenced by politics and current events which included: "The Ballad Of Rep. MacArthur's New A**h*le, as ripped for him by Jeff from Pine Beach", "Town Hall Tonight by The Angry Constituents (aided and abetted by steinski)", "Fearless Leader Is Watching, or, 'Orange Is The New President'", "Trump Inaugural Address Leaked By Russian Hackers", "Seventeen, a Stoneman Douglas collage.".

In 2017 Double Dee and Steinski launched their first official website which included detailed information about their history and music together. The website also announced that they had begun working with a DJ named ADA who would be contributing samples and adding scratching for a variety of new projects which included the long-awaited "Lesson 4". They also launched an official Bandcamp page where fans can hear and download remastered versions of the original Lessons, as well as newer music they'd been working on.

In March, 2018 Double Dee released a track called "What's The Angle?" which was the first in a series of collaborations with DJ/producer ADA.

On October 26, 2018 "Lesson 4" was premiered live on WFMU radio during Billy Jam's weekly show "Put the Needle on the Record", with original president of Tommy Boy Records Monica Lynch also in the studio serving as a co-host. Lesson 4 was later released on their Bandcamp page as a digital download. The full track includes an extended coda at the end called "This Music", which was also released as a separate track on "Lesson 4: The EP". The EP also includes an instrumental mix of "Lesson 4", and dub mix of "This Music".

== Tributes and recognition ==
Since the 1980s, many hip hop artists have added their own contributions to the series of Lessons. A partial list is included below:

- The De La Soul song "The Magic Number" from their 1989 album 3 Feet High and Rising begins with a tribute to DiFranco and Stein's "Lesson 3". It contains many of the same samples, arranged in a similar, although shortened, sequence.
- DJ Shadow – "Lesson 4" (1991)
- Cut Chemist – "Lesson 4: The Radio" (1993) – At the time, Cut Chemist was apparently unaware of the existence of Shadow's similarly titled "Lesson 4" from two years earlier; the two would later collaborate on several "Live Lessons".
- DJ Pixie Stix a.k.a. Happy Hardcore King of SV - "Lesson 5" (1995)
- Cut Chemist – "Lesson 6: The Lecture" (1997) – This track appears on the Jurassic 5 EP. Many editions of the EP contain slightly different versions of the song, due to copyright issues. Most notably, samples of the "Jawa Theme" from Star Wars are missing from most of the re-issues.
- DJ Format – "The English Lesson" (1999)
- DJ Bombjack – "Lesson 7-inch (1999)

== Samples ==
Lesson One:The Payoff Mix

- "Play That Beat" by G.L.O.B.E. and Whiz Kid
- "The Adventures of Grandmaster Flash on the Wheels of Steel" by Grandmaster Flash and The Furious Five
- Play It Sam...Play "As Time Goes By" (Avalon/As Time Goes By) by Humphrey Bogart (dialogue spoken from the movie Casablanca)
- "That's the joint" by Funky Four Plus One
- Take the Country to N.Y. City by Hamilton Bohannon
- "Don't Make Me Wait" (Acapella) by Peech Boys
- "Stop! In The Name Of Love" by The Supremes
- "Rockit" by Herbie Hancock
- "Situation" 12-inch by Yazoo
- "Starski Live at the Disco Fever" by Lovebug Starski
- "World's Famous", "Hobo Scratch", "D'Ya Like Scratchin'" and "Buffalo Gals" by Malcolm McLaren
- "Apache" by Incredible Bongo Band
- "Tutti Frutti" by Rufus Thomas
- "Last Night A DJ Saved My Life" by Indeep
- "I'll Tumble 4 Ya" by Culture Club
- Speech by Fiorello La Guardia from Reading the Comics - July, 1945

Lesson Two:The James Brown Mix

- Songs by James Brown
  1. "Get Up (I Feel Like Being a) Sex Machine"
  2. "Make It Funky"
  3. "Say It Loud – I'm Black and I'm Proud"
  4. "Mother Popcorn"
  5. "Get Up Offa That Thing"
  6. "Escape-ism"
  7. "I Got Ants in My Pants"
  8. "Get on the Good Foot"
  9. "I Got You (I Feel Good)"
- Dialogue from Orson Welles's War of the Worlds radio show
- "Do the Do" by Kurtis Blow
- Tweety Bird dialogue
- "Hobo Scratch" by Malcolm McLaren
- "Two, Three, Break" by The B-Boys
- "Funk n Bop" by Mutiny
- "Mama Used to Say" by Junior
- "...do you ya feel lucky?" dialogue from the movie Dirty Harry spoken by Clint Eastwood
- "Now how about cutting the rebop?!" dialogue from the movie A Streetcar Named Desire spoken by Marlon Brando
- "Rock The House" by The B-Boys
- Bugs Bunny dialogue
- "Itch and Scratch" by Rufus Thomas
- "Dance to the Music" by Sly and the Family Stone
- "Looking For The Perfect Beat" by Afrika Bambaataa
- "Play That Beat" by MC G.L.O.B.E.
- "Double Dutch Bus" by Frankie Smith
- Speech by Fiorello La Guardia
- "Change Le Beat" by Fab Five Freddy

Lesson Three:History

- "The Crunge" by Led Zeppelin
- "The torch has been passed to a new generation..." sample from Inaugural Address speech (1961) by John F. Kennedy
- "Dance to the Drummer's Beat" by Herman Kelly & Life
- "Jam on the Groove" by Ralph MacDonald
- "Hernando's Hideaway" by Archie Bleyer
- "Generator Pop" (Extended Version) by P-Funk All Stars
- "Scorpio" by Dennis Coffey
- "Human Beatbox" by Fat Boys
- "Listen To Me" by Baby Huey
- "Jam On It" by Newcleus
- "Funky Music Is the Thing" by Dynamic Corvettes
- "Got to have soul!" from the movie Putney Swope
- "Apache" by Incredible Bongo Band
- The Flying Saucer" (Part One) by (Bill Buchanan and Dickie Goodman)
- "Planet Rock" by Afrika Bambaataa
- "You know how to whistle..." dialogue from the film To Have and Have Not spoken by Lauren Bacall
- "I could dance with you till the cows come home..." dialogue from the film Duck Soup spoken by Groucho Marx
- Opening to The Tonight Show Starring Johnny Carson
- Speech by Fiorello La Guardia

The Motorcade Sped On

- Opening to The Tonight Show Starring Johnny Carson
- Opening chord from "A Hard Day's Night" by The Beatles
- Multiple samples from the Inaugural Address speech (1961) by John F. Kennedy
- Break from "Honky Tonk Women" by The Rolling Stones
- Multiple samples from CBS news bulletin by Walter Cronkite reporting the JFK assassination
- Sample from the Ich bin ein Berliner speech (1963) by John F. Kennedy
- "Ugh!" sample from "Kiss" by Prince
- "Oh!" sample from "The Show" by Doug E. Fresh and the Get Fresh Crew
- "Why?" sample from "Tough" by Kurtis Blow
- "Flash!" sample from "Flash" (a.k.a. Flash's Theme) by Queen from the Flash Gordon soundtrack
