= Audacity (Ugly Duckling album) =

Studio album by Ugly Duckling
- Released: January 12, 2009
- Genre: Hip-hop
- Length: 49:15
- Label: Fat Beats Records
- Producer: Young Einstein

Ugly Duckling chronology
Bang for the Buck (2006)	Audacity (2009)	Moving at Breakneck Speed (2011)

Professional ratings
Review scores
Source	Rating
HipHopDX	3.5/5

Audacity is Ugly Duckling's fourth studio album, which was released on January 12, 2009. It has a generally more melancholy feel than their previous, mostly upbeat work.

== Track listing ==
1. "I Won't Let It Die" - 4:15
2. "The Takedown" - 3:52
3. "Audacity - Parts One and Two" - 5:03
4. "Falling Again" - 4:22
5. "It's Gone" - 3:47
6. "I Want to Believe" - 4:52
7. "Einstein Do It (Night on Scratch Mountain)" - 4:30
8. "The Lonely Ones" - 4:11
9. "Pay or Quit" - 1:34
10. "Right Now" - 4:27
11. "It Never Mattered" - 4:36
12. "Oh Yeah" - 3:54
