= Journey to Anywhere =

Studio album by Ugly Duckling
- Released: May 7, 2001
- Genre: Hip-hop
- Length: 51:21
- Label: 1500 Records (first pressing) Emperor Norton/Rykodisc Records (second pressing) (United States); XL Recordings (United Kingdom)

Ugly Duckling chronology
Fresh Mode (EP) (1999)	Journey to Anywhere (2001)	Taste the Secret (2003)

Professional ratings
Review scores
Source	Rating
AllMusic	4/5 stars
RapReviews	9.5/10

Journey to Anywhere is the first full-length studio recording by Long Beach, California, hip-hop group Ugly Duckling.

== Track listing ==
1. "Introduckling" – 3:30
2. "I Did It Like This" – 3:12
3. "Journey to Anywhere" – 4:31
4. "Friday Night" – 3:19
5. "A Little Samba" – 3:20
6. "The Pike" – 2:10
7. "If You Wanna Know" – 3:54
8. "Eye on the Gold Chain" – 3:16
9. "Pickup Lines" – 3:14
10. "Rock on Top" – 3:48
11. "Oasis" – 3:33
12. "Dizzy" – 2:18
13. "Down the Road" – 3:59
14. "Lay It on Ya" – 3:21
15. "Visions" (Bonus Track) – 3:46
