= Understand This =

Understand This.

Studio album by Grand Puba
- Released: October 23, 2001
- Recorded: 2000–2001
- Studio: ACME Studios (Mamaroneck, NY)
- Genre: Hip-hop
- Length: 54:47
- Label: Koch
- Producer: Grand Puba (also exec.); Lord Jamar

Grand Puba chronology
2000 (1995)	Understand This. (2001)	Retroactive (2009)

Professional ratings
Review scores
Source	Rating
AllMusic	2/5 stars
HipHopDX	3/5
The New Rolling Stone Album Guide	2/5 stars

Understand This is the third solo studio album by American rapper and record producer Grand Puba. It was released on October 23, 2001, through Koch Records. Recording sessions took place at Acme Recording Studios in Mamaroneck, New York. Production was handled by Grand Puba and Lord Jamar. It features guest appearances from Tiffany Johnson, Khadijah Mohammed, The Restless, and fellow Brand Nubian members Sadat X and Lord Jamar. The album did not reach the Billboard 200, however, it peaked at number 32 on the Top R&B/Hip-Hop Albums and number 12 on the Independent Albums charts in the United States. The album produced three singles: "Understand This", "Up & Down", and "Issues".

== Track listing ==
No.	Title	Writer(s)	Producer(s)	Length
1.	"Grand Pu" (featuring Khadijah Mohammed)	Maxwell Dixon	Grand Puba	3:38
2.	"All Day" (featuring Khadijah Mohammed)	Dixon	Grand Puba	3:56
3.	"Issues"	Dixon	Grand Puba	3:35
4.	"What U Gonna Do for Me" (featuring Tiffany Johnson)	Dixon; Tiffany Johnson	Grand Puba	3:50
5.	"Skit 1"			1:15
6.	"Don't Lie to Me"	Dixon	Grand Puba	2:07
7.	"Skit 2"			0:20
8.	"What's Up Wit It" (featuring Tiffany Johnson and Sadat X)	Dixon; Johnson; Derek Murphy	Grand Puba	3:54
9.	"Skit 3"			0:23
10.	"Dreams"	Dixon	Grand Puba	4:20
11.	"Skit 4"			0:21
12.	"Understand This" (featuring Khadijah Mohammed)	Dixon	Grand Puba	4:03
13.	"Skit 5"			0:40
14.	"Baby Mama Drama"	Dixon	Grand Puba	3:53
15.	"Up & Down" (featuring Sadat X)	Dixon	Lord Jamar	3:07
16.	"Skit 6"			0:29
17.	"What U Want" (featuring Tiffany Johnson)	Dixon; Johnson	Grand Puba	4:03
18.	"Keep It Movin" (featuring Sadat X and Khadijah Mohammed)	Dixon; Lorenzo Dechalus	Grand Puba	4:06
19.	"Spazz Out 2" (featuring The Restless)	Dixon; The Restless	Grand Puba	3:59
20.	"How Many More"	Dixon	Grand Puba	2:53
Total length:				54:47

== Personnel ==
- Maxwell "Grand Puba" Dixon – vocals, arrangement, producer (tracks: 1–14, 16–10), executive producer
- Khadijah Islah Mohammed – chorus (tracks: 1, 2, 12, 18)
- Tiffany Johnson – vocals (tracks: 4, 8, 17)
- Derek "Sadat X" Murphy – vocals (track 8), chorus (track 15)
- Lorenzo "Lord Jamar" Dechalus – vocals (track 18), producer (track 15)
- The Restless – vocals (track 19)
- Plat-Numb Mike – engineering (tracks: 1–9, 11–14, 16–20), mixing
- Jim Albert – engineering (tracks: 10, 15)
- Jeff Gilligan – artwork, design
- Güler Ugar – photography

== Charts ==
Chart (2001)	Peak position
US Top R&B/Hip-Hop Albums (Billboard)	32
US Independent Albums (Billboard)	12
