= The Audience's Listening =

Studio album by Cut Chemist
- Released: July 11, 2006
- Genre: Hip-hop
- Length: 43:25
- Label: Warner Bros. Records
- Producer: Cut Chemist

Cut Chemist chronology
The Audience's Listening (2006)	Die Cut (2018)

Singles from The Audience's Listening
- 1. "The Audience Is Listening Theme Song" Released: 2006; 2. "The Garden / Storm" Released: 2006; 3. "What's the Altitude" Released: 2006

Professional ratings
Aggregate scores
Source	Rating
Metacritic	79/100
Review scores
Source	Rating
AllMusic	3.5/5 stars
Alternative Press	5/5 stars
The A.V. Club	A−
Entertainment Weekly	B
The Guardian	3/5 stars
Mojo	3.5/5 stars
PopMatters	7/10
Stylus Magazine	B
Uncut	3.5/5 stars
URB	4/5 stars

The Audience's Listening is the debut studio album by Cut Chemist, released on Warner Bros. Records on July 11, 2006. It features guest appearances from Hymnal, Edan, Mr. Lif, and Thes One.

== Production ==
After leaving Jurassic 5 in 2004, Cut Chemist spent 18 months working exclusively on the album, which he had already been working on for 2 years. He spent almost a year clearing samples.

== Critical reception ==
At Metacritic, which assigns a weighted average score out of 100 to reviews from mainstream critics, the album received an average score of 79% based on 15 reviews, indicating "generally favorable reviews".

David Jeffries of AllMusic gave the album 3.5 stars out of 5 and described it as "a well-crafted, highly enjoyable effort that overcomes the 'all samples cleared' challenge all big-label turntablist albums must face." Jeff Vrabel of PopMatters gave the album 7 stars out of 10, saying, "It's DJ music for the casual fan, something you don't need to be a knob-twiddler or connoisseur of the break beat to appreciate or enjoy."

In 2015, Vice named it the 49th greatest dance album of all time.

== Track listing ==
No.	Title	Length
1.	"Motivational Speaker"	1:48
2.	"(My 1st) Big Break"	4:30
3.	"The Lift"	1:25
4.	"The Garden"	6:16
5.	"Spat"	2:21
6.	"What's the Altitude" (featuring Hymnal)	4:23
7.	"Metrorail Thru Space"	3:56
8.	"Storm" (featuring Edan and Mr. Lif)	3:28
9.	"2266 Cambridge" (featuring Thes One)	2:34
10.	"Spoon"	5:31
11.	"A Peak in Time"	4:52
12.	"The Audience Is Listening Theme Song"	2:20

Japanese edition bonus track
No.	Title	Length
13.	"Beats Thru Space"	3:18

== Charts ==
Chart	Peak position
UK Dance Albums (OCC)	20
US Top Dance/Electronic Albums (Billboard)	7
US Heatseekers Albums (Billboard)	16
