= Black from the Future =

Studio album by Grand Puba
- Released: April 15, 2016
- Genre: Hip-hop
- Length: 36:41
- Label: Babygrande; iHipHop Distribution
- Producer: Big Sproxx; DJ PhD; Grand Puba; Vance Wright

Grand Puba chronology
| Retroactive (2009) | Black from the Future (2016) |

Singles from Black from the Future
- 1. "The More Things Change"

Professional ratings
Review scores
| Source | Rating |
|---|---|
| UndergroundHipHop | 3/5 stars |

Black from the Future is the fifth solo studio album by American rapper and record producer Grand Puba from the hip-hop group Brand Nubian. It was released on April 15, 2016, by Babygrande Records with distribution via iHipHop Distribution. Production was handled by Big Sproxx, DJ PhD, Vance Wright, and Grand Puba himself, with Chuck Wilson serving as executive producer. It features guest appearances from Isis Aja and Khadijah Mohammed.

It is his first album since the 2009 album Retroactive since beginning his solo career in 1992. It was released on April 15, 2016. It includes socially-charged and rhythmatical tracks such as the conscious single "The More Things Change."

== Track listing ==
| No. | Title | Producer(s) | Length |
|---|---|---|---|
| 1. | "UDK" | Grand Puba | 3:12 |
| 2. | "The More Things Change" (featuring Isis Aja) | DJ PhD | 3:57 |
| 3. | "Tap Out" | Big Sproxx | 2:42 |
| 4. | "Original" | Grand Puba | 2:58 |
| 5. | "It's Over" | DJ PhD | 2:15 |
| 6. | "Think of U" (featuring Isis Aja) | Big Sproxx | 3:23 |
| 7. | "Yard" (featuring Isis Aja) | Big Sproxx | 3:24 |
| 8. | "Respect" (featuring Khadijah Mohammed) | Grand Puba | 3:15 |
| 9. | "Be Mine" | Big Sproxx | 2:09 |
| 10. | "Do the One" | Big Sproxx | 3:01 |
| 11. | "Magic Man" (featuring Isis Aja) | Vance Wright | 3:10 |
| 12. | "It's Been a While" | DJ PhD | 3:15 |
| Total length: | | | 36:41 |

== Personnel ==
- Maxwell "Grand Puba" Dixon – vocals, producer (tracks: 1, 4, 8)
- Isis Aja – vocals (tracks: 2, 6, 7, 11)
- Khadijah Islah Mohammed – vocals (track 8)
- DJ PhD – producer (tracks: 2, 5, 12)
- Joe "Big Sproxx" Savino – producer (tracks: 3, 6, 7, 9, 10)
- Vance Wright – producer (track 11)
- Jason Angel – mixing
- Matty Trump – mastering
- Charles "Chuck" Wilson Jr. – executive producer
- Ian Tait – artwork
