= Miles Tackett =

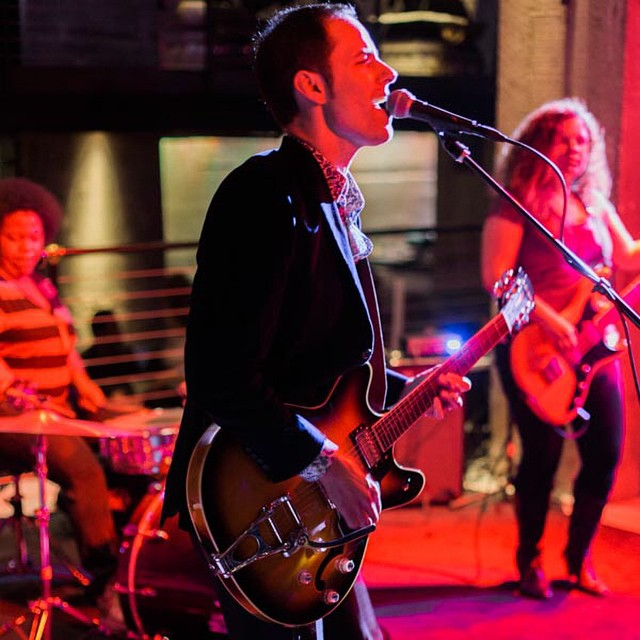
- The Fool Who Wonders Tour

Background information
- Origin: Los Angeles, California, U.S.
- Labels: Columbia Records, Stones Throw, Ubiquity Records
- Website: Miles Tackett

Miles Tackett is a musician and producer. He founded Breakestra.

== Biography ==
Miles Tackett grew up in the Santa Monica Mountains of Topanga Canyon. His father is Fred Tackett, the multi-instrumental member of 70s American rock band Little Feat. While in his teens, Miles co-formed the band The Inclined and in 1993 they released Bright New Day (Columbia). In 1999, Breakestra released the Miles Tackett produced & composed his first deep funk track "Getcho Soul Togetha" on Stones Throw Records which featured him on drums, bass & guitar along with Mixmaster Wolf on vocals. A full length Breakestra record “the Live Mix tape part 2” on Stones Throw soon followed. A few years later after securing a deal with Ubiquity Records Miles composed, produced, and played on Breakestra's Hit the Floor which included all-original songs. Tackett and Breakestra appear on the soundtrack for the 2005 Tony Hawk's American Wasteland video game. In late 2009, Breakestra led by Miles Tackett put together the full-length CD, Dusk Till Dawn, which featured guest rapper Chali 2na.

== Discography ==
Solo Projects:

- The Fool Who Wonders (The Root Down, Los Angeles) 2014
- Out Of Time Out Of Mind (Global Muse, Japan) 2007

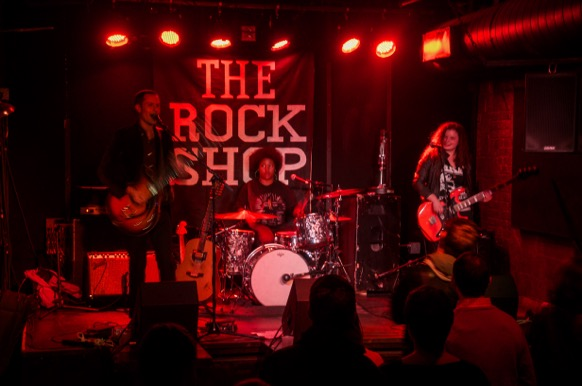
Miles Tackett performing at The Rock Shop in Brooklyn, NY

Miles Tackett Produced Albums:

- ‘’ The Fool Who Wonders’’ (Root Down) 2014
- Dusk Till Dawn (Strut Records) 2009
- Hit The Floor (Ubiquity Records) 2005
- The Live Mix Part 2 (Stones Throw Records) 2000
- Live Mix Part 1 (Stones Throw Records) 1998

Miles Tackett Produced EPs:

- Joyful Noise (Strut Records) 2009
- Stand Up (Ubiquity Records) 2006
- ‘’ Ring of Fire ‘’ Johnny Cash/June Carter Cover (45 only)2004
- ‘’ Deuces Up Double Down’’ 45 single 2001
- Yesterdays New Quintet / Breakestra / Mr Dibbs* - Suite For Weldon (Stones Throw Records) 2003
- Remember Who You Are • Cramp Your Style • Baby Don't Cry (Rapster Records) 2001
- Dj Music Man Miles mixes
- ‘’Funky Sole Vol.1’’ 2003
