= Product Placement (album) =

Live album by DJ Shadow & Cut Chemist
- Released: 2001
- Recorded: 2001
- Genre: Hip-hop
- Length: 56:44
- Label: One29
- Producer: DJ Shadow & Cut Chemist

DJ Shadow & Cut Chemist chronology
Brainfreeze (1999)	Product Placement (2001)	Product Placement On Tour (2004)

Professional ratings
Review scores
Source	Rating
AllMusic	link
NME	link
Pitchfork	6.0/10 link

Product Placement is an album by DJ Shadow and Cut Chemist. It was released in 2001 on One29 Records.

== Comments ==
The CD was on sale only at gig venues on DJ Shadows tours between about 2001–2003 and was made on an extremely limited run (6000 apparently).

The cover has a picture of Cut Chemist and DJ Shadow. Cut Chemist is dressed as a chef, DJ Shadow a dirt bike racer and drinking milk served to him by Cut Chemist. A sticker on the case reads "Now fortified with exclusive "Accu-Blend" technology". On the rear is a picture of a milk carton and the inside shows pictures of some of the records used to make the mix along with the slogan "It's it's so so nice nice we had to do it twice twice" and text that explains the 'recipe' for the record.

== Track listing ==
First set

- Sesame Street (Oscar the Grouch) – "I Got Two"
- Little Grady Lewis & Soul Smokers – "Smokin' Soul"
- Dennis Coffey – "A Whole Lot Of Love"
- LL Cool J – "I Need Love"
- Eddie Simpson – "Big Black Funky Slave"
- Harold Alexander – "Mama Soul"
- Charlie Whitehead – "Let's Do It Again (Part 3)"
- Cold Grits – "It's Your Thing"
- Backyard Heavies – "Expo '83"
- Rory-O & Chuck Colbert- "Do It Your Way"
- Timmy Thomas – "Sexy Woman"
- Kool & The Gang – "N.T."
- Freddie Scott – "(You) Got What I Need"
- James & Bobby Purify – "I'm Your Puppet"
- The Oceanliners – "Funky Pants"
- Thunder, Lightning & Rain – "Super Funky Part 1"
- James Brown – "Talkin' Loud And Sayin' Nothin'"
- Swithold – "Slowburner"
- National Fuel Gas Distribution Corporation – "Rappin' With Gas"
- CD III – "Get Tough"
- Man Parrish – "Hip Hop, Be Bop (Don't Stop)"
- The B-Boys – "Rock The House"
- Newcleus – "Jam On It"
- Davy DMX – "One For The Treble"
- Grandmaster Melle Mel – "Step Off"
- Newcleus – "Destination Earth"
- Soul Searchers – "Ashley's Roachclip"
- Orange Krush – "Action"
- Pieces Of A Dream – "Mt. Airy Groove"
- Bill Withers – "Kissin' My Love"
- Mandrill – "Mango Meat"
- Jazzy Jeff – "A Touch Of Jazz"
- Kid 'N Play – "Last Night (Instrumental)"
- Esther Williams – "Last Night Changed It All"
- James Brown – "Funky President"
- Miami – "Chicken Yellow"
- Johnny Cameron & The Camerons – "Funky John (original pressing)/(Atlantic pressing)"
- Willie John Ellison – "You Got To Have Rhythm"
- Harvey & The Phenomenals – "Soul And Sunshine"
- Mongo Santamaría – "Coylude"
- Communicators & Black Experience Band – "The Road"
- Denis Bryant – "Soul Man"

Second set

- Lifeforce – "The Freeze"
- Earnest Jackson – "Funky Black Man"
- Little Buck – "Little Boy Blue"
- Dandelion Wine – "Hot Dog"
- Nu-Sound Express – "One More Time You All"
- The Commodores – "Keep On Dancing"
- Gerald Wilson Orchestra – "California Soul"
- Marlena Shaw – "California Soul"
- The Poets – "Fun Buggy"
- Union – "Strike"
- The New Seekers – "It's The Real Thing (radio spot)"
- Ivor Raymonde Orchestra – "It's The Real Thing"
- American Dietary Association Of Mississippi – "The Basic"
- Cookie Crew – "Born This Way (Instrumental)"
- Larry Sanders – "Story Of My Love"
- Jessie James – "Move On Out Of My Way"
- Yellow Sunshine – "Yellow Sunshine"
- Rodney O & Joe Cooley – "Cooley High"
- Nairobi And The Awesome Foursome – "Funky Soul Makossa (Rap)"
- Logic Circuit – "Motorcross Pt. 2"
- Hell's Belles (movie radio spot)
- The Outcasts – "Loving You Sometimes"
- Gran Am – "Get High"
- David McCallum – "House Of Mirrors"

There is also an accompanying CD entitled Product Placement Breaks which is a compilation of some of the original tracks in an unmixed form.
