= Reel to Reel =

Studio album by Grand Puba
- Released: October 20, 1992
- Recorded: 1991–1992
- Studio: Power Play (Long Island City); Chung King House of Metal (New York); The Hit Factory (New York)
- Genre: Hip-hop
- Length: 57:37
- Label: Elektra
- Producer: Grand Puba; Stimulated Dummies; DJ Shabazz; Latief; the Brand New Heavies

Grand Puba chronology
Reel to Reel (1992)	2000 (1995)

Singles from Reel to Reel
- 1. "360 Degrees (What Goes Around)" Released: July 16, 1992; 2. "Check It Out" Released: December 4, 1992; 3. "Ya Know How It Goes" Released: 1993

Reel to Reel is the debut solo studio album by American rapper Grand Puba. It was released on October 20, 1992, through Elektra Records. The recording sessions took place at Power Play Studios in Long Island City, at Chung King House of Metal, and at The Hit Factory in New York. The album was produced by Grand Puba, Stimulated Dummies, Anthony Latief King, DJ Shabazz, Kid Capri, and the Brand New Heavies.

The album peaked at number 28 on the Billboard 200 and at number 14 on the Top R&B/Hip-Hop Albums chart in the United States.

The album was preceded by two charted singles: "360 Degrees (What Goes Around)" and "Check It Out". Its lead single, "360° (What Goes Around)", reached No. 68 on the Billboard Hot 100, No. 30 on the Hot R&B/Hip-Hop Songs and No. 1 on the Hot Rap Songs. The second single, "Check It Out" featuring Mary J. Blige, made it to No. 85 on the Hot R&B/Hip-Hop Songs and No. 13 on the Hot Rap Songs. The album's third single, "Ya Know How It Goes", was released in 1993 and did not make it to any Billboard charts.

== Critical reception ==
Professional ratings
Review scores
Source	Rating
AllMusic	4/5 stars
Christgau's Consumer Guide	(1-star Honorable Mention)
Entertainment Weekly	B+
RapReviews	8.5/10
(The New) Rolling Stone Album Guide	3/5 stars
Select	3/5 medals
The Source	4/5 stars
USA Today	3/4 stars

USA Today wrote that "Grand Puba plumbs rap basics: minimal production with scratching, sampling, funky/drum-oriented grooves and Puba's infectious sing-song voice boasting".

== Track listing ==
No.	Title	Writer(s)	Producer(s)	Length
1.	"Check tha Resume"	M. Dixon	Grand Puba	3:51
2.	"360 Degrees (What Goes Around)"	M. Dixon; R. Miller	Grand Puba	4:01
3.	"That's How We Move It"	M. Dixon; C. Stanley	DJ Shabazz	3:19
4.	"Check It Out" (featuring Mary J. Blige)	M. Dixon; R. Hammond	Grand Puba	3:32
5.	"Big Kids Don't Play"	M. Dixon	Grand Puba	3:47
6.	"Honey Don't Front"	M. Dixon; J. Dajani; J. Gamble; D. Ross	Grand Puba; SD50's	4:08
7.	"Lick Shot"	M. Dixon; J. Dajani; J. Gamble; H. Ousley	Grand Puba; SD50's	4:35
8.	"Ya Know How It Goes"	M. Dixon; O. Redding; A. Jones; A. Isbell	Grand Puba	4:19
9.	"Reel to Reel"	M. Dixon; R. Streeter	Grand Puba	3:57
10.	"Soul Controller"	M. Dixon; A. King	Latief	4:25
11.	"Proper Education"	M. Dixon	Grand Puba	3:35
12.	"Back It Up"	M. Dixon; D. Love; J. Forman	Grand Puba; Kid Capri	3:51
13.	"Baby What's Your Name?"	M. Dixon	Grand Puba	2:54
14.	"360° (What Goes Around) SD50 Remix" (Bonus track)	M. Dixon; R. Miller		4:00
15.	"Who Makes the Loot?" (Bonus track)	M. Dixon; A. Levy; J. Kincaid; S. Bartholomew	The Brand New Heavies; Orlando Aguillen (co.)	3:23
Total length:				57:37

== Personnel ==
- Maxwell Dixon – vocals, producer (tracks: 1, 2, 4–9, 11–13), mixing
- Mary J. Blige – vocals (track 4)
- Anton Pukshansky – bass (track 2)
- Roland Parkins – bass & guitar (track 6)
- Clarence Stanley – producer (track 3)
- John 'Geeby' Dajani – producer (tracks: 6, 7), re-mixing (track 14)
- John Gamble – producer & engineering (tracks: 6, 7), re-mixing (track 14)
- Dante Ross – producer (tracks: 6, 7), re-mixing (track 14), executive producer
- Anthony Latief King – producer (track 10)
- David Anthony Love Jr. – producer (track 12)
- Andrew Levy – producer (track 15)
- Jan Kincaid – producer (track 15)
- Simon Bartholomew – producer (track 15)
- Orlando Aguillen – co-producer (track 15)
- Rob Sutton – engineering (tracks: 1–4, 8, 13)
- Vaughn Sessions – engineering (tracks: 5, 9–13)
- Showtyme – assistant engineering (tracks: 3, 5, 8–12)
- Jack Hersca – assistant engineering (tracks: 6, 7)
- Herb Powers Jr. – mastering
- Carol Bobolts – design
- Mark Seliger – photography

== Charts ==
Chart (1992)	Peak position
US Billboard 200	28
US Top R&B/Hip-Hop Albums (Billboard)	14
