= Retroactive (album) =

Studio album by Grand Puba
- Released: June 9, 2009
- Genre: Hip-hop
- Label: Babygrande
- Producer: Big Throwback; Billy Brick; DJ PhD; Elements; Grand Puba; Grant Parks; Large Professor; Q-Tip

Grand Puba chronology
Understand This (2001)	Retroactive (2009)	Black from the Future (2015)

Singles from Retroactive
- 1. "This Joint Right Here/Go Hard" Released: September 2009

Professional ratings
Review scores
Source	Rating
HipHopDX	2.5/5
PopMatters	7/10
RapReviews	8/10
Robert Christgau	(1-star Honorable Mention)

Retroactive is the fourth solo studio album by American rapper and record producer Grand Puba. It was released on June 9, 2009, via Babygrande Records. Production was handled by DJ PhD, Billy Brick, Big Throwback, Elements, Grant Parks, Large Professor, Q-Tip, and Grand Puba himself. It features guest appearances from his fellow Brand Nubian groupmates Lord Jamar and Sadat X, Kid Capri, Big Phill, Khadijah Mohammed, Large Professor, Q-Tip, Rell, Sarah Martinez, Talee and Tiffani Davis. The album did not reach the Billboard 200, however, it peaked at number 97 on the Top R&B/Hip-Hop Albums chart in the United States.

== Track listing ==
No.	Title	Producer(s)	Length
1.	"I See Dead People" (featuring Rell and Lord Jamar)	DJ PhD	4:26
2.	"Hunny"	Grant Parks	4:04
3.	"It Is What It Is" (featuring Tiffani Davis)	DJ PhD	5:03
4.	"Get That Money"	DJ PhD	3:23
5.	"How Long?"	Elements	3:53
6.	"Good to Go" (featuring Q-Tip)	Q-Tip	2:21
7.	"Same Old Drama" (featuring Large Professor)	Large Professor	1:29
8.	"This Joint Right Here" (featuring Kid Capri)	Grand Puba	3:17
9.	"Go Hard" (featuring Talee)	Grand Puba; Billy Brick	3:35
10.	"Reality Check" (featuring Sarah Martinez)	DJ PhD	3:08
11.	"Cold Cold World" (featuring Khadijah Mohammed)	Grand Puba; Billy Brick	4:31
12.	"Smile (Outro)" (featuring Big Phill)	Big Throwback	1:55
13.	"This Joint Right Here (Remix)" (featuring Kid Capri and Brand Nubian)	Grand Puba	3:23

== Personnel ==
- Maxwell "Grand Puba" Dixon – vocals, producer (tracks: 8, 9, 11, 13)
- Tiffani Davis – vocals (tracks: 3)
- Khadijah Islah Mohammed – vocals (track 11)
- Kid Capri – vocals (tracks: 8, 13)
- Lord Jamar – vocals (tracks: 1, 13)
- Brand Nubian – vocals (tracks: 13)
- Q-Tip – vocals, producer (track 6)
- Large Professor – vocals, producer (track 7)
- DJ PhD – producer (tracks: 1, 3, 4, 10)
- Big Throwback – producer (tracks: 12)
- Randy Gonzales of West Village Studios, Sabastien "9BOY" Plassais and Wayne "Heethen" Adams @ KMA Studios, NYC – recorded, mixed, engineered
- Mark Christensen @ Engine Room Audio, NYC - mastering
- Charles "Chuck" Wilson Jr. – executive producer
- Domingo Neris - associate producer
- Willy Friedman - product manager
- Scott Buckets – artwork & design

== Charts ==
Chart (2009)	Peak position
US Top R&B/Hip-Hop Albums (Billboard)	97
