= Breakestra =

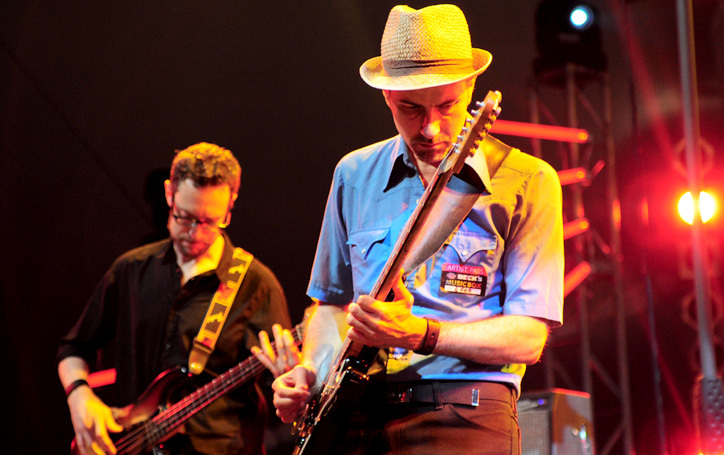

Background information
- Origin: Los Angeles, United States
- Genres: Funk, Soul, Hip Hop
- Labels: Ubiquity Records, Stones Throw, Now-Again
- Website: http://www.breakestra.com

Breakestra is a ten-piece funk "orchestra" from Los Angeles, California, formed by Miles Tackett in 1996.

Tackett, also known as "Musicman", records, composes, plays bass, upright cello, guitar, keyboards and drums. He also sings along with the other front man Mix Master Wolf. The style in which Breakestra plays live setting & on record is much influenced by late 1960s and early 1970s funk & soul-jazz music and the respective samples that were used in late 1980s/early 1990s hip hop as The Live Mix, Part 1 and The Live Mix, Part 2 show.

After releasing their first 7 inch single "Getcho Soul Togetha" (an original composition in fact) in 1999 on Stones Throw records and two full-length albums of mostly covers and sample-filled breaks, Breakestra put out Hit the Floor in 2005 on Ubiquity Records, which included all-original recordings fusing elements of hip hop, funk, and soul. Tackett put together another original full length, "Dusk Till Dawn" in late 2009 that featured guest rapper Chali 2na, the late DJ DUSK & soul vocalist Afrodyete "the African goddess of love". Tackett continues to bring different incarnations of Breakestra out on tour when not working on projects in his home studio.

Breakestra covered The Mohawks' "Champ" in 2005 on the in-game soundtrack for Tony Hawk's American Wasteland.

== Discography ==
- The Live Mix, Part 1 (Rootdown Records) (1999)
- The Live Mix, Part 2 (Stones Throw Records) (2001)
- Hit The Floor (Ubiquity Records) (2005)
- Dusk Till Dawn (Strut Records) (2009)
