= Skull Snaps =

Funk music group

- Genres: Funk; deep funk; rare groove; soul
- Years active: 1963–1970 (The Diplomats); 1970–1973, 2005 (Skull Snaps)
- Labels: GSF, Ten12 Records
- Past members: Erv Littleton Waters; Sam O. Culley; George Bragg

Skull Snaps was a soul / funk group active between 1963 and 1973. Until 1970 they were known as The Diplomats, and released a number of singles with some success. The members were Ed Stasium, Ervan Waters, George Bragg, Samm Culley. Renamed Skull Snaps, they released an eponymous album on the small GSF label in 1973 before suddenly disappearing.

Ten12 Records re-united all the original members of Skull Snaps (Erv Littleton Waters, Sam O. Culley, and George Bragg) in 2005 in tandem with the band's first official release, "Snapped"/"I'm Your Pimp", since its 1975 single.

Under the direction of Skull Snaps frontman Erv Waters, Ten12 Records planned to release the entire Skull Snaps catalog on CD and DVD, with recordings from the original album plus five bonus tracks: "Al's Razor Blade", "Ain't That Lovin' You", "On Top of It", "Soul Makossa", and "She's the One".

== Skull Snaps album ==
Professional ratings
Review scores
| Source | Rating |
|---|---|
| AllMusic | 3/5 stars |

The Skull Snaps album contains drum breaks that have been sampled numerous times on various hip hop records. In 1989, hip-hop artist Stezo first sampled the opening drums from their song, "It's a New Day" on his work titled, "It's My Turn".

The opening drum pattern of "It's a New Day" has been used on songs by Ol' Dirty Bastard, Das EFX, DJ Jazzy Jeff & the Fresh Prince, Eric B. & Rakim, Digable Planets, DJ Shadow, Rob Dougan, Stabbing Westward, the Prodigy, Panjabi MC, Suprême NTM, Linkin Park, and others. Many of these artists sampled the drum pattern from the Stezo track, which included a section where the drums played without accompaniment.

=== Tracklist ===
| Title | Length |
|---|---|
| "My Hang Up Is You" | 4:02 |
| "Having You Around" | 4:30 |
| "Didn't I Do It to You" | 3:15 |
| "All of a Sudden" | 3:23 |
| "It's a New Day" | 3:04 |
| "I'm Your Pimp" | 4:03 |
| "I Turn My Back on Love" | 2:45 |
| "Trespassing" | 4:03 |
| "I'm Falling Out of Love" | 2:46 |
