= Hard Sell (TV series) =

- Hard Sell title card
- Genre: Reality
- Directed by: Mary Albion; Ben Brewster; Jon Mowat
- Presented by: Mark Franks
- Country of origin: United Kingdom
- Original language: English

Production
- Executive producer: Tom Ware
- Producers: Sallie Bevan; Hannah Corneck
- Editor: Glen Lewis
- Running time: 30 minutes

Original release
- Network: BBC One
- Release: October 2006

Hard Sell is a British reality television series which began showing in October 2006 on BBC One, produced by BBC Bristol and presented by Mark Franks. In the show two teams have to sell a collection of items for the greatest price possible.

== Format ==
Hard Sell sets two teams of two, against each other to out-sell each other in a race to make as much money as possible. Each team is issued a suitcase which contains a number of items (of similar value) which they must sell various places of the city. Some of the items are also linked to the region in which the edition of the show is being filmed. The winning team is awarded both the money they make and the profits of the other team.

== Trivia ==
- Filming only takes one day.
