= Rap Pages =

American hip hop magazine

- The cover of the April 1997 issue, featuring the King of New York portrait of the Notorious B.I.G.
- Categories: Music magazine
- Total circulation (1993): 100,000
- Founder: Larry Flynt
- First issue: October 1991; 33 years ago
- Final issue: c. 2000
- Company: Larry Flynt Publications; Timaj Publications
- Country: United States
- Based in: Los Angeles, California
- Language: English
- ISSN: 1063-1283

Rap Pages was an American music magazine, one of the first publications dedicated to hip hop. The first issue was released in October 1991. Originally published by Larry Flynt Publications, the magazine was closed in October 1999. It was sold to Timaj Publications in May 2000, who released several more issues, but by the end of 2000 stopped publication. Rap Pages set itself apart from other contemporary music magazines, particularly The Source, with its comprehensive coverage of West Coast hip hop artists, something they believed other publications lacked.

== History ==
Rap Pages was founded by the publisher Larry Flynt. According to Sheena Lester, a later editor-in-chief, one of Flynt's bodyguards came up with the idea for the magazine. Rap Pages was one of the first magazines dedicated to hip hop. The first issue was released in October 1991. It featured a pick-up shot of the rapper Ice Cube on the cover, as the magazine was not shooting its own covers at the time. The magazine was based in Los Angeles, California.

At the time, the West Coast artists believed that The Source, which was the leading hip hop magazine, did not represent their scene adequately. Rap Pages was launched with the editor-in-chief Dane Webb announcing a goal to shift the focus to West Coast, citing the perceived East Coast bias of The Source as the reason. Another goal Webb proclaimed was to improve Black communities, with him encouraging people to "[s]pend less time drinkin' them damn 40s, spend less time on the corner and more time in them books". Rap Pages started as a bimonthly magazine, eventually switching to one issue every six weeks, and then switching to a monthly format in October 1995. According to the writer Jeff Weiss, Rap Pages was the only magazine that offered a full-time coverage of West Coast hip hop.

In October 1999, Larry Flynt Publications halted publication of Rap Pages and put the magazine up for sale. They received multiple bids, and sold it to Timaj Publications in May 2000. Under the new management and with the original editor-in-chief Dane Webb the magazine was relaunched, with plans of launching a separate Spanish-language version. However, after releasing several more issues, Rap Pages once again ceased publication by the end of 2000. The Jersey Journal reported in January 2002 that Rap Pages was a defunct magazine. In 2014, a website Rap Pages TV was launched.

== Covers ==
Despite using a leftover portrait from another photo shoot as the cover of its first issue, later on Rap Pages started producing their own photos for the covers. The magazine hired the photographer Brian Cross, who was its photo editor from 1993 to 1998. Describing his time in Rap Pages, Cross said: "We had a team of A-list editors who all went on to do important things in hip-hop, and we would just sit around and have these loose, funny conversations, which is how we came up with a lot of shoot concepts." In his book Totally Wired, the writer Paul Gorman praised Rap Pages as a magazine that "showcased inventive layouts and striking front covers", noting that it occurred during Sheena Lester's tenure as editor-in-chief. Complex magazine also commended Rap Pages, saying that "in its prime Rap Pages ... [boasted] high-quality reporting, niche hip-hop coverage, and some very original covers". The publication placed several Rap Pages covers in its list of the 50 greatest hip hop magazine covers; some of the covers included are an Ol' Dirty Bastard's parody of Janet Jackson's Rolling Stone cover, which shows him standing behind a topless fan, covering her breasts with his hands, a cover depicting Lauryn Hill as a four-armed goddess, and a cover depicting the group Pharcyde wrapped in a recording tape.

Another Rap Pages cover, which Rolling Stone magazine called "iconic", was the portrait of the Notorious B.I.G. wearing a crown. The photograph, titled King of New York, was taken by Barron Claiborne, three days prior to the rapper being assassinated on March 9, 1997. It was the last photoshoot of the Notorious B.I.G. The portrait quickly became one of the most well-known photos of the rapper. In 2020, the plastic crown used in the photo, originally purchased by Claiborne for $6, was sold through an auction for $594,750.
