= Ugly Duckling (hip-hop group) =

American hip-hop group

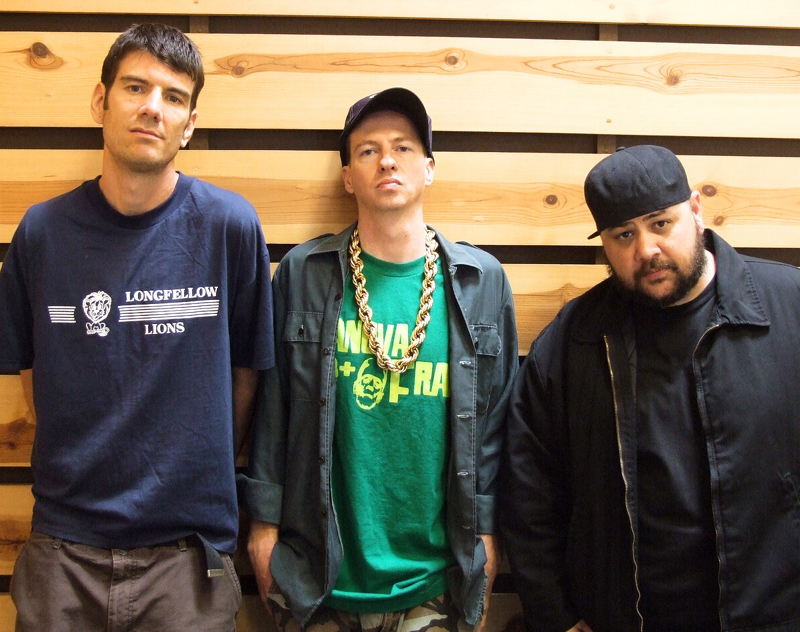
- Ugly Duckling

Background information
- Origin: United States
- Genres: Alternative hip-hop, underground hip-hop, jazz rap
- Years active: 1993–present
- Labels: XL Recordings; Fat Beats; Emperor Norton/Rykodisc; 1500/A&M/Universal Records
- Members: Andy Cooper; Dizzy Dustin; Young Einstein
- Website: www.uglyduckling.us

Ugly Duckling is an American hip-hop group that formed around 1993. Ugly Duckling's members include Dizzy Dustin (Dustin McFarland), Young Einstein (Rodney Pleasant Jr.) and Andy Cooper. The band decided to take the name Ugly Duckling because they felt like outcasts in the hip-hop scene of the mid-1990s. According to the book How to Rap: the Art & Science of the Hip-Hop MC, it is one of the most prominent underground hip-hop groups.

== History ==
Each of the member of the group. Dizzy, Einstein and Andy met each other through mutual friends and eventually began creating and performing music together.

In 1995, the group self-released its first album Down The Road on cassette, which was sent as promo copies to radio stations and began to build a local following. The original promos came from a rainbow pack of tapes and differ in color. In 1998, they independently released their debut 12 single "Fresh Mode" on their own Special Records imprint which was licensed and eventually distributed worldwide and led to the band getting its first record deal with 1500/A&M/Universal.

== Musical style ==
The group's style is primarily a throwback to the kind of hip-hop popular in the late 1980s and early '90s. It uses samples (particularly drum breaks and loops) as the foundation of most tracks, whereas many modern artists have given up sampling in favor of synthesized sounds and drum-machine beats. The two MCs, Andy and Dizzy, frequently alternate lyrics and often punctuate each others lines, reminiscent of early groups like Double Trouble, The Treacherous Three and Beastie Boys. Ugly Duckling is known for humorous and intelligent lyrics, "lampooning the excesses of modern hip hop", such as its obsession with sex and materialism.

In live shows, the group's DJ Young Einstein employs complex scratching routines with vinyl instrumental records to provide the musical backdrop for the rappers unlike many modern hip-hop groups who work from digital media. Einstein is also the owner of the group's unofficial mascot, the dookie gold rope, which is the subject of the song "Eye on the Gold Chain" and is worn by Einstein during live performances. They have performed in more than 30 countries including Canada, Australia, China, Japan, Korea, Poland, the United Kingdom, and Scandinavia.

Ugly Duckling's music songs often incorporate themes such as love, forgiveness, and rejection of worldly values. Some songs include lyrics pertaining to the biblical end times while others express fondness for simple pleasures such as sleep and food. They frequently use language reminiscent of early hip-hop hyperbole, where the primary goal of lyrics was to brag and self promote in an exaggerated and often humorous fashion.

== Influences ==
Ugly Duckling is influenced by a variety of artists including everything from old school hip-hop groups to golden age hip-hop artists. Their influences include groups like Run-DMC, Eric B. & Rakim, EPMD, and the Native Tongues groups A Tribe Called Quest, De La Soul, and Jungle Brothers. Other influences include Boogie Down Productions, Public Enemy, Brand Nubian (whose member Grand Puba appeared on UD’s 2003 track "Something’s Going Down Tonight") and countless others who were prominent during the development of early hip-hop. The Ugly Duckling song "Do You Know What I'm Sayin," from the 1999 release Fresh Mode, is made up entirely of lines and phrases from classic hip-hop songs strung together in homage to some of their favorite tracks and artists.

== Appearances in media ==
Their song "Smack" is featured in Tony Hawk's Project 8 and also on skater Paul Rodriguez Jr.'s Footage soundtrack. "Get on This" is featured in the movie Boiler Room, "Turn It Up" is featured in the movie Eurotrip, and "Something's Going Down Tonight" was featured in the kayaking film Means Of Production as well as the movie Drillbit Taylor.

Ugly Duckling provides the intro music for Australian radio duo Hamish and Andy. In February 2015, "Smack" was used as the trailer music for Ant & Dec's Saturday Night Takeaway on British TV channel ITV.

The group's music featured extensively in the BBC sitcom Ideal. Their song "Just a Little Samba" is featured in an advertisement for Visa shown in several European countries (UK, Germany, Sweden, etc.) during the 2014 World Cup football world championship.

The song "Einstein Do It" is used in the preview trailer for the 2021 game Riders Republic.

The songs "Audacity, Pts 1 & 2", "Bang for the Buck", "Left Behind", "Lower the Boom", and "Oh Yeah" were also featured on the in-game soundtrack for the game Riders Republic.

== Discography ==
=== Albums ===
- Down the Road (Unofficially distributed later released through Bandcamp, July 23, 1995)
- Journey to Anywhere (1500/A&M/Universal Records, May 7, 2001)
- Taste the Secret (Emperor Norton/Rykodisc Records, June 16, 2003)
- Combo Meal: Taste the Secret/The Leftovers EP (Emperor Norton/Rykodisc, 2004)
- Bang for the Buck (Fat Beats, April 11, 2006)
- The Best Of (Handcuts, 2006)
- Audacity (Fat Beats Records, January 12, 2009)
- Moving at Breakneck Speed (Special Records, February 14, 2011)

=== EPs ===
- Fresh Mode (originally released on Bad Magic Records, April 20, 1999, Cat. No: MAGICCD1. Re-released on 1500/A&M/Interscope/Universal Records)
- The Leftovers EP (Earshot, July 16, 2003)

=== Singles ===
- "Fresh Mode" (Special Records, 1998)
- "Everybody, C'mon" (1500/A&M/Interscope/Universal Records, 1999)
- "Now Who's Laughin'" (1500/A&M/Interscope/Universal Records, 1999)
- "I Did It Like This" (XL Recordings & Emperor Norton/Rykodisc, 2000)
- "A Little Samba" (XL Recordings and Emperor Norton/Rykodisc, 2001) #70 UK
- "A Little Samba" (remixes) (XL Recordings and Emperor Norton/Rykodisc, 2001)
- "Eye on the Gold Chain" (XL Recordings and Emperor Norton/Rykodisc, 2001)
- "Eye on the Gold Chain" (remixes) (XL Recordings, 2001)
- "Dumb It Down" (Emperor Norton/Rykodisc Records, 2003)
- "Pass It On" (Emperor Norton/Rykodisc Records, 2003)
- "Rio de Janeiro" (Emperor Norton/Rykodisc Records, 2003)
- "Turn It Up" (Emperor Norton/Rykodisc Records, 2003)
- "Get Ready" (2004)
- "Yudee!" (Fat Beats, 2005)
- "Smack" (Fat Beats, 2006)
- "Left Behind" (Fat Beats, 2006)
- "Left Behind" (Wichita Mix) (Fat Beats, 2006)
