= Grand Puba =

American rapper

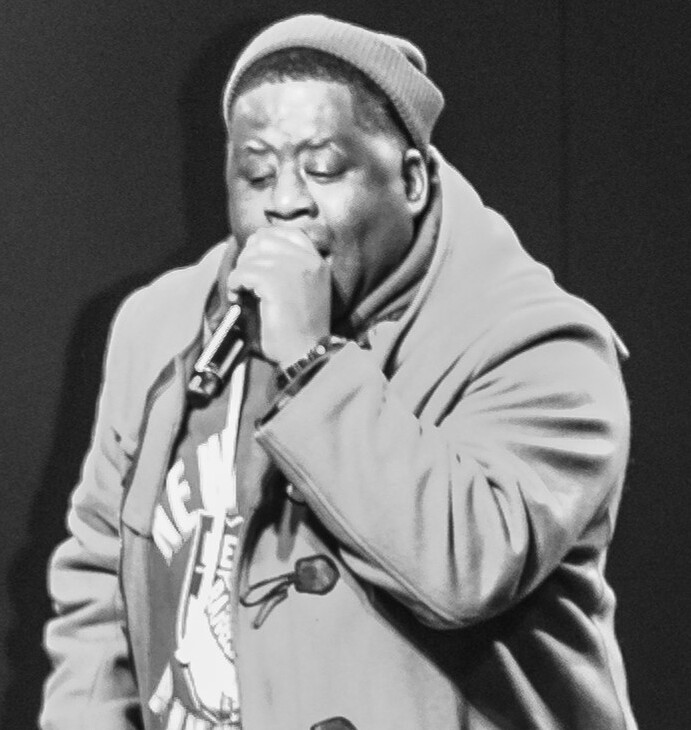
- Grand Puba performing in 2014

Background information
- Also known as: Grand Puba Maxwell; Grand P
- Born: William Brewster Dixon III; March 4, 1966 (age 60); New Rochelle, New York, U.S.
- Genres: Hip-hop
- Occupations: Rapper; record producer
- Years active: 1985–present
- Labels: 4th & B'way; Island; Elektra; Arista; MNRK; Babygrande
- Member of: Brand Nubian
- Formerly of: Masters of Ceremony; Tray-Bag MC's

Maxwell Dixon (born William Brewster Dixon III; March 4, 1966), known professionally as Grand Puba, is an American rapper and record producer, best known as a member of Brand Nubian from New Rochelle, New York. He was formerly a member of Masters of Ceremony.

== Early life ==
Puba was born on March 4, 1966 in New Rochelle. During the late 1970s, Puba first got into hip-hop after purchasing cassettes of his favorite artists such as The Cold Crush Brothers, T-Connection and Grandmaster Flash and the Furious Five. Puba attended the Remington Boys Club in New Rochelle. While at his club, a DJ by the name of Grand Mixer DXT would send out cassette tapes, helping Puba learn to rap and write rhymes. His first cousin by the name of Dr. Who (Tod Dixon),, who would later form the group Masters of Ceremony with Puba, would accompany him, banging on tables, and the two would be trading rhymes. Puba was also a breakdancer. He began making beats on cassettes in New Rochelle. When he was finally known, he started DJing at clubs. His first rap group was called the "Tray-Bag MC's".

== Career ==
He made his debut as Grand Puba Maxwell with the group Masters of Ceremony in 1985. Their album Dynamite (1988) was praised by critics, but because of lack of sales, the group soon disbanded and Puba became the lead emcee of Brand Nubian after working out a deal with A&R Dante Ross and signing with Elektra Records. After their debut album One for All (1990), Puba left the group and began a solo career. He released his first solo album Reel to Reel on Elektra Records in 1992, alongside DJ Stud Doogie and DJ Alamo, a former member of Brand Nubian. In 1992 Sean "Puffy" Combs tapped Grand Puba to collaborate with up & coming R&B singer Mary J. Blige on her debut album What's the 411? The title song was co-written by Puba and made number one on the R&B charts in the early 1993. He released his second album 2000 in 1995.

Around 1997, he rejoined Brand Nubian, recording a few tracks and leading up to the full-length album Foundation in 1998. Puba said in an interview with Billboard, "I never did go, I just wanted that experience and it was a good thing". In 1999, Grand Puba and Sadat X performed on the track "Once Again" on Handsome Boy Modeling School's concept album So... How's Your Girl? After following Brand Nubian's 2004 record Fire in the Hole, Grand Puba appeared on tracks with Beanie Sigel ("Bread and Butter", also featuring groupmate Sadat X), Missy Elliott ("My Struggles", featuring his onetime collaborator Mary J. Blige), and Ugly Duckling ("Something's Going Down Tonight").

He released his third album Understand This in 2001 on Koch Records.

In 2009, Grand Puba released his fourth solo album, Retroactive, featuring production from Q-Tip, Large Professor, Kid Capri as well as fellow Brand Nubians. Puba also appeared on the heavy posse cut "Fresh" together with Cormega, KRS-One, Big Daddy Kane, DJ Red Alert and PMD.

In 2016, he released his fifth album Black from the Future.

== Personal life ==
Puba's son, Sonny Dixon, who goes by the name Stunna Gang, is also an emcee.

== Discography ==
=== Studio albums ===
==== Solo ====
- Reel to Reel (1992)
- 2000 (1995)
- Understand This (2001)
- Retroactive (2009)
- Black from the Future (2016)
- The Brooklyn Premiere (2024) with Grandmaster Melle Mel and Cappadonna
- The Origin: the Retirement Package Volume 1 (2025)

==== with Masters of Ceremony ====
- Dynamite (1988)

==== with Brand Nubian ====
- One for All (1990)
- Foundation (1998)
- Fire in the Hole (2004)
- Time's Runnin' Out (2007)
- Vamp Bikers with Grandmaster Melle Mel, Grand Master Caz and Grand Wizard Theodore, Directed by Eric Spade Rivas
