= Spirit in Stone =

Studio album by Lifesavas
- Released: July 1, 2003
- Studios: Accompong Compound (Oakland, CA); The Hut (Oakland, CA); The Promised Land (Portland, OR)
- Genre: Hip-hop
- Length: 1:05:36
- Label: Quannum
- Producers: Chief Xcel; Lifesavas

Lifesavas chronology
Spirit in Stone (2003)	Gutterfly (2007)

Singles from Spirit in Stone
- 1. "Head Exercise" Released: 2001; 2. "What If It's True" Released: 2002; 3. "Fever / Selector" Released: 2003; 4. "Fa' Show" Released: 2004

Professional ratings
Review scores
Source	Rating
AllMusic	3/5 stars
The Austin Chronicle	4/4 stars
HipHopDX	7.5/10
Pitchfork	6.8/10
RapReviews	7.5/10
Tiny Mix Tapes	4/5 marks
The Village Voice	A−

Spirit in Stone is the debut studio album by American hip-hop group Lifesavas. It was released on July 1, 2003, via Quannum Projects. The recording sessions took place at Accompong Compound and The Hut in Oakland and The Promised Land in Portland. The album was produced by members Jumbo the Garbageman, Vursatyl and Rev. Shines, as well as Chief Xcel, who also served as executive producer. It features guest appearances from Blackalicious, J-Live, Latyrx and DJ Shadow, and contributions from Tim Harper, Leah Hendricks, Joyo Velarde and Virginia Byrd, among others.

== Track listing ==
No.	Title	Writer(s)	Producer(s)	Length
1.	"Soldierfied"	Solomon David; Marlon Irving; Xavier Mosley	Chief Xcel	1:42
2.	"It's Over"	David; Irving; Mike Jackson	Jumbo the Garbageman	3:08
3.	"What If It's True?"	David; Irving	Jumbo the Garbageman	3:38
4.	"Livin' Time / Life: Movement 1 / Livin' Lude" (featuring the Gift of Gab)	David; Irving; Timothy Parker; Ryan Shortell	Rev. Shines	4:39
5.	"Fever"	David; Irving	Jumbo the Garbageman	5:23
6.	"HelloHiHey"	David; Irving	Jumbo the Garbageman; Vursatyl	5:38
7.	"Head Exercise"	David; Irving	Jumbo the Garbageman	3:43
8.	"Selector / Fa' Show (Door Drama) (Skit)" (featuring J-Live)	David; Irving; Jean-Jacques Cadet	Jumbo the Garbageman	3:46
9.	"Fa' Show"	David; Irving	Jumbo the Garbageman	4:36
10.	"State of the World / Apocalypse / War"	David; Irving	Jumbo the Garbageman; Vursatyl	2:39
11.	"Resist"	David; Irving	Jumbo the Garbageman	3:12
12.	"5th Horseman / Thuggity Skit"	David; Irving	Jumbo the Garbageman	5:52
13.	"Skeletons"	David; Irving	Jumbo the Garbageman	4:35
14.	"Emerge / Blackbirds (My People) Interlude" (featuring Latyrx, Blackalicious and DJ Shadow)	David; Irving; Lateef Daumont; Tom Shimura; Parker; Mosley	Chief Xcel	6:41
15.	"Me"	David; Irving	Jumbo the Garbageman	5:25
16.	"Spirit in Stone Outro"	David; Irving; Virginia Byrd	Jumbo the Garbageman	0:59
Total length:				1:05:36

== Personnel ==
- Solomon "Jumbo the Garbageman" David – vocals, scratches, producer, recording, mixing
- Marlon "Vursatyl" Irving – vocals, vocal arrangement, producer, recording
- Ryan "Rev. Shines" Shortell – scratches, producer
- Tim "Harp" Harper – vocals, organ
- Timothy "Gift of Gab" Parker – vocals
- Jean-Jacques "J-Live" Cadet – vocals
- Leah Hendricks – vocals
- Lateef "The Truth Speaker" Daumont – vocals
- Tsutomu "Lyrics Born" Shimura – vocals
- Joyo Velarde – vocals
- Adrienne Irving – vocals
- Marckia Irving – vocals
- Virginia Byrd – vocals
- Teak Underdue – guitar, bass
- Hervé Salters – clavinet, Rhodes electric piano, organ
- MixMasta KD – scratches
- DJ D-Sharp – scratches
- Jerry Harris Jr. – Rhodes electric piano
- Torrey "T Swurvell" Ward – bass
- Eric McFadden – guitar
- Sedell Jones – harpsichord
- Joshua "DJ Shadow" Davis – scratches
- Xavier "Chief Xcel" Mosley – producer, recording, mixing, executive producer
- Charlie Brown – recording
- Mikael "Count" Eldridge – mixing
- Mike Cresswell – mixing
- James Ward – mixing
- Eugene Smith – engineering assistant
- Jason Malig – engineering assistant
- Marco Martin – engineering assistant
- Mike Boden – engineering assistant
- John Cuniberti – mastering
- Chris Gehringer – mastering
- Marissa Kaiser – photography
