= How to Rap =

Book by Paul A. Edwards

How to Rap series
- Volumes: How to Rap: The Art & Science of the Hip-Hop MC; How to Rap 2: Advanced Flow & Delivery Techniques
- Author: Paul Edwards
- Country: United States
- Language: English
- Genre: Non-fiction hip hop
- Publisher: Chicago Review Press
- Published: December 1, 2009 (sequel was published on September 1, 2013)
- Media type: Print (paperback)

How to Rap: The Art & Science of the Hip-Hop MC is a 2009 book on hip hop music and rapping by Paul Edwards. It is compiled from interviews with 104 notable rappers who provide insights into how they write and perform their lyrics.

How to Rap 2: Advanced Flow & Delivery Techniques is a sequel to the book, also on hip hop music and rapping by Paul Edwards, published in 2013. It includes more insights from the interviews done from the first book.

== Publication ==
How to Rap: The Art & Science of the Hip-Hop MC was published by Chicago Review Press on December 1, 2009 with a foreword by Kool G Rap. Publishers Weekly states that it “goes into everything from why rappers freestyle to the challenges of collaboration in hip-hop”, and Library Journal says, "instruction ranges over selecting topics and form, editing, rhyming techniques, putting words to music, collaborating, vocal techniques, studio tips, and performance".

How to Rap 2: Advanced Flow & Delivery Techniques was also published by Chicago Review Press on September 1, 2013 with a foreword by Gift of Gab of Blackalicious. In the sequel, reviewers note that, "Edwards asks advanced wordsmiths for advice on rhythm, melody, pitch, timing, enunciation, percussion, playing characters, rhyme schemes, and rhyme patterns."

How to Rap is published in the UK by Random House on their Virgin Books imprint. This edition is also published by Random House in Australia. It was translated and published in Japanese by P-Vine Books in 2011 (part of P-Vine Records) and translated and published in Korean by Hans Media, also in 2011.

== Artists interviewed ==
The book is compiled from interviews with rappers; the interviews comprise the majority of the book's content. The following artists were interviewed by the author:

- 2Mex of The Visionaries
- 40 Cal. of The Diplomats
- Aesop Rock
- Akil The MC of Jurassic 5
- Akir
- AMG
- Andy Cat of Ugly Duckling
- AZ
- Big Daddy Kane
- Big Noyd
- Big Pooh of Little Brother
- Bishop Lamont
- Bobby Creekwater
- Bootie Brown of The Pharcyde
- B-Real of Cypress Hill
- Brother Ali
- Brother J of X-Clan
- Buckshot of Black Moon and Boot Camp Clik
- Cage
- Cappadonna of Wu-Tang Clan
- Cashis
- Chuck D of Public Enemy
- C-Murder
- Cormega
- KXNG Crooked of Slaughterhouse
- David Banner
- Del the Funky Homosapien of Hieroglyphics
- Devin The Dude
- DJ Quik
- Dray of Das EFX
- E-40
- El Da Sensei of Artifacts
- Esoteric of 7L & Esoteric
- Evidence of Dilated Peoples
- Fredro Starr of Onyx
- Gift Of Gab of Blackalicious and Quannum
- Glasses Malone
- Gorilla Zoe
- Guerilla Black
- Havoc of Mobb Deep
- Hell Rell of The Diplomats
- Ill Bill of Non Phixion and La Coka Nostra
- Imani of The Pharcyde
- Immortal Technique
- Joell Ortiz of Slaughterhouse
- Killah Priest (Wu-Tang Clan affiliate)
- Kool G Rap
- K-Os
- Lady Of Rage
- Lateef the Truthspeaker of Latyrx and Quannum
- Lord Jamar of Brand Nubian
- Masta Ace
- MC Serch of 3rd Bass
- MC Shan
- Mighty Casey (rapper)
- Mr. Lif
- Murs
- Myka 9 of Freestyle Fellowship
- Noreaga
- O.C. of Diggin' in the Crates Crew
- Omar Cruz
- One Be Lo of Binary Star
- Papoose
- Paris
- Pharoahe Monch of Organized Konfusion
- Phife Dawg of A Tribe Called Quest
- Pigeon John of Quannum and LA Symphony
- Planet Asia of Cali Agents
- Pusha T of Clipse
- Q-Tip of A Tribe Called Quest
- R.A. the Rugged Man
- Rah Digga
- Rampage of Flipmode Squad
- RBX
- Remy Ma
- Rock of Heltah Skeltah and Boot Camp Clik
- Royce da 5'9" of Bad Meets Evil and Slaughterhouse
- Schoolly D
- Sean Price of Heltah Skeltah and Boot Camp Clik
- Sheek Louch of The LOX
- Shock G of Digital Underground
- Speech of Arrested Development
- Spider Loc
- Stat Quo
- Steele of Smif-n-Wessun and Boot Camp Clik
- Stressmatic of The Federation
- Styles P of The LOX
- T3 of Slum Village
- Tajai of Souls of Mischief and Hieroglyphics
- Tash of Tha Alkaholiks
- Tech N9ne
- Termanology
- Thes One of People Under the Stairs
- Twista
- Vast Aire of Cannibal Ox
- Vinnie Paz of Jedi Mind Tricks
- Vursatyl of Lifesavas and Quannum
- Wildchild of Lootpack
- Wise Intelligent of Poor Righteous Teachers
- Wordsworth
- Yukmouth of The Luniz
- Zumbi of Zion I

It also includes information on other artists, who are commented on by the interviewed artists, including:

- Beastie Boys
- Big Pun
- Dr. Dre
- Eminem
- Jay-Z
- KRS-One
- Melle Mel of Grandmaster Flash and the Furious Five
- Nas
- The Notorious B.I.G.
- Rakim
- Snoop Dogg
- T.I.
- Tupac Shakur

== Reception ==
The book was positively received by critics and press outlets. Library Journal says it is, “filled with real tools and overflowing with inspiration… a good read even for nonartists.” Hip Hop Connection called it “a complete guide to the art and craft of the MC.,” and Campus Circle give it a “Grade: A+”.

XXL magazine said "over 100 rappers have offered their insight on the artform for aspiring wordsmiths", while Yale University Press's Anthology of Rap referred to How to Rap's "rich array of interviews with old school and new school artists," and Oxford University Press's How to Fix Copyright recommended How to Rap for a good "general" overview.

Dana Gioia, poet and former chairman of the National Endowment for the Arts wrote, “How To Rap marks a cultural coming-of-age for Hip-Hop… [it] is the first comprehensive poetics of this new literary form. …Edwards has made his bid to become the Aristotle of Hip-Hop poetics”.

It also received positive comments from hip-hop journalists and authors such as Kembrew McLeod, Dan LeRoy, Alex Ogg, Mickey Hess, Russell Potter, and Pancho McFarland, and from artists such as Georgia Anne Muldrow, Egon of Stones Throw Records, Badru Umi, and Speech of Arrested Development.

In a review of the Kanye West album Yeezus, news outlet The Daily Beast praised the book, saying: "In Paul Edwards’s comprehensive tome How to Rap, the author surveyed a plethora of rap emcees—104, to be exact—in order to demystify the rap process."
