= SoleSides Greatest Bumps =

Compilation album by Quannum
- Released: October 31, 2000
- Recorded: 1992–1997
- Genre: Hip hop
- Length: 100:47
- Label: Quannum Projects, Ninja Tune
- Producer: DJ Shadow, Chief Xcel, Lyrics Born

Quannum Projects chronology
Quannum Spectrum (1999)	SoleSides Greatest Bumps (2000)

Professional ratings
Review scores
Source	Rating
AllMusic	4.5/5 stars
CMJ New Music Monthly	favorable
Robert Christgau	(3-star Honorable Mention)
Exclaim!	favorable
PopMatters	favorable
Spin	favorable

SoleSides Greatest Bumps is a 2000 compilation album released by Quannum Projects and Ninja Tune. The album was compiled by DJ Shadow and is a retrospective of the work of SoleSides (the larger precursor crew to Quannum MCs), consisting of material recorded between 1992 and 1997. It was ranked at number 5 on CMJ's 2001 hip-hop chart.

== Track listing ==
Disc 1
No.	Title	Artist(s)	Length
1.	"Intro"		0:33
2.	"Rhyme Like a Nut!"	The Gift of Gab	3:50
3.	"Entropy (Part A: The Third Decade, Our Move)"	DJ Shadow	4:26
4.	"Lyric Fathom"	Blackalicious	3:50
5.	"The Wreckoning"	Lateef the Truth Speaker	4:56
6.	"Asia's Verse"	Lyrics Born	1:33
7.	"Deep in the Jungle"	Blackalicious	6:50
8.	"Hardcore (Instrumental) Hip-Hop"	DJ Shadow	4:44
9.	"Send Them"	Lyrics Born	4:01
10.	"Swan Lake"	Blackalicious	5:42
11.	"Lady Don't Tek No"	Latyrx	3:38

Disc 2
No.	Title	Artist(s)	Length
1.	"Latyrx (Last Chance to Comprehend)"	Latyrx	1:58
2.	"Say That"	Latyrx	3:37
3.	"Freestyle Rapping"	The Solesides Crew	7:05
4.	"Rhymes for the Deaf, Dumb, & Blind"	Blackalicious	2:10
5.	"Entropy (Part C: Count & Estimate)"	DJ Shadow featuring The Gift of Gab	3:22
6.	"Fully Charged on Planet X (Edit)"	Chief Xcel featuring The Gift of Gab and Lateef	3:41
7.	"The Quickening"	Lateef the Truth Speaker	5:05
8.	"Hot Breath"	Mack B. Dog	1:36
9.	"Balcony Beach"	Lyrics Born featuring Joyo Velarde	5:14
10.	"Lateef's Freestyle"	Lateef the Truth Speaker	2:32
11.	"Blue Flames"	Quannum MCs	15:04
12.	"Untitled" (hidden track)	The Solesides Crew	5:25
