= Overnite Encore: Lyrics Born Live =

Studio album by Lyrics Born
- Released: October 31, 2006
- Genre: Hip hop
- Label: Quannum Projects

Lyrics Born chronology
Same !@#$ Different Day (2005)	Overnite Encore: Lyrics Born Live (2006)

Professional ratings
Review scores
Source	Rating
Allmusic	link
Okayplayer	link
RapReviews.com	9.0/10 link

Overnite Encore: Lyrics Born Live is the third album by Lyrics Born, a Japanese-American hip hop musician. For this album Lyrics Born is backed by a live band as he performs hits from his previous album Later That Day, as well as more recent songs. The album also features three new studio-recorded songs which feature Bay area MC Mistah F.A.B., Tim "Herb" Alexander (of the Bay area progressive band, Primus), Del the Funky Homosapien and fellow Quannum artist, Pigeon John.

Overnite Encore: Lyrics Born Live! is the first live album released by Lyrics Born's own Quannum Projects. It received rave reviews and has been called one of the best live hip-hop records ever recorded.

The album was recorded in Sydney and Melbourne, Australia in 2005.

== Track listing ==
1. "Sydney Intro"
2. "Shake It Off"
3. "Pack Up"
4. "Hott Bizness"
5. "Funk U Up"
6. "Lady Don't Tek No"
7. "Stop Complaining [Remix]"
8. "Aim For The Flickering Flame"
9. "Love Me So Bad"
10. "Melbourne Intro"
11. "Callin' Out"
12. "Do That There Medley"
13. "I Can't Wait For Your Love"
14. "I'm Just Raw"
15. "Bad Dreams Prelude"
16. "Bad Dreams"
17. "Goodnite"
18. "Knock Knock" (bonus studio track)
19. "L-I-F-E" (feat. Mistah F.A.B.) (bonus studio track)
20. "I'm Just Raw [Reopened & Remixed]" (feat. Pigeon John, Del tha Funkee Homosapien, Tim Alexander) (bonus studio track)

== Credits ==
- Lyrics Born - Vocals
- Joyo Velarde - Backing Vocals
- B'Nai Rebelfront - Guitars
- Darius Minaee - Drums
- Kev Choice - Keyboards, Vocals
- Marcus Phillips - Bass
