= The Album (Latyrx album) =

Studio album by Latyrx
- Released: August 25, 1997
- Venue: Studio A at KDVS
- Studio: Nash Studios (Oakland, CA); The Glue Factory (San Francisco, CA); Live Oak Studios (Berkeley, CA)
- Genre: Hip-hop
- Length: 36:02
- Label: SoleSides
- Producer: Chief Xcel; DJ Shadow; Lyrics Born

Latyrx chronology
The Album (1997)	The Second Album (2014)

Lateef the Truthspeaker chronology
The Album (1997)	Ambush (2004)

Lyrics Born chronology
The Album (1997)	Later That Day... (2003)

The Album is the debut studio album by American hip-hop duo Latyrx. It was released on August 25, 1997, through Solesides Records. The recording sessions took place at Nash Studios in Oakland, The Glue Factory in San Francisco, Studio A at UC Davis college station KDVS, and Live Oak Studios in Berkeley. It was produced by Lyrics Born, DJ Shadow, and Chief Xcel. It features guest appearances from Blackalicious and John Tchicai, and contributions from Joyo Velarde and funk/jazz band Free Association.

Quannum Projects, the rebranded and expanded version of SoleSides, reissued the album in 2002. At the 20th anniversary of The Album, it was remastered and re-released with two bonus tracks via Real People.

== Critical reception ==
Professional ratings
Review scores
Source	Rating
AllMusic	4.5/5 stars
RapReviews	10/10
Spin	9/10
The Village Voice	A−

Steve "Flash" Juon of RapReviews praised the album, saying it "takes crazy mad chances with hip-hop, stretching boundaries and the imagination" and is "built on solid skills". Dave Tompkins of Spin wrote: "Lateef and Lyrics Born uncannily emulate the album's instrumentation", adding "the savvy production gives anthropomorphic life to the sampler, with beats ranging from the gnashing ruckus to the mighty soul". Robert Christgau of The Village Voice founded "Lyrics Born is deep and contemplative, Lateef speedy and confrontational", concluding "except on the predictable boast tracks toward the end, their language elevates the music". AllMusic's Steve Huey said that "its key tracks are nothing short of visionary, making it an essential listen".

In 2015, Fact placed it at number 67 on their "The 100 best indie hip-hop records of all time" list.

== Track listing ==
No.	Title	Writer(s)	Producer(s)	Length
1.	"Latyrx"	Lateef Daumont; Tsutomu Shimura; Joshua Paul Davis	DJ Shadow	5:48
2.	"Say That"	Daumont; Shimura	Lyrics Born	3:41
3.	"The Quickening (The Wreckoning, Part II)"	Daumont; Davis	DJ Shadow	5:02
4.	"Balcony Beach"	Shimura	Lyrics Born	5:30
5.	"Live at 90.3 '94" (featuring John Tchicai)			1:25
6.	"The Muzapper's Mix: Aim for the Flickering Flame/Rankin' No. 1"	Daumont; Shimura	Lyrics Born	4:13
7.	"Funky Granules"			1:49
8.	"Bad News"	Daumont; Xavier Mosley	Chief Xcel	2:46
9.	"Off (With) Their Heads (Be Prompt)"	Daumont; Shimura	Lyrics Born	3:03
10.	"Interlude"			0:24
11.	"Burnt Pride"	Shimura	Lyrics Born	6:53
12.	"Scratchapella"			0:23
13.	"The Wreckoning (Live 45 Mix)"	Daumont; Davis	DJ Shadow	2:47
14.	"Burning Hot in Cali on a Saturday Night" (featuring Blackalicious)	Daumont; Shimura; Timothy Jerome Parker; Mosley	Chief Xcel	3:30
Total length:				36:02

20th anniversary deluxe edition bonus tracks
No.	Title	Writer(s)	Producer(s)	Length
15.	"Looking Over a City" (featuring El-P)	Daumont; Shimura; Jaime Meline; Davis	El-P	5:00
16.	"Last Trumpet"	Daumont; Shimura	Lyrics Born	4:54
