= Gutterfly =

Studio album by Lifesavas
- Released: April 24, 2007
- Studio: The Promiseland (Portland, OR); Accompong Compound (Oakland, CA); Norwood's Crib (Venice Beach, CA)
- Genre: Hip-hop
- Length: 1:01:52
- Label: Quannum Projects
- Producer: Chief Xcel; Jake One; Lifesavas; Oh No; Vitamin D

Lifesavas chronology
Spirit in Stone (2003)	Gutterfly (2007)

Professional ratings
Review scores
Source	Rating
AllMusic	3.5/5 stars
HipHopDX	3/5
MSN Music	(2-star Honorable Mention)
Pitchfork	8/10
RapReviews	8/10
Spin	3.5/5 stars
Tiny Mix Tapes	2.5/5 marks
Tom Hull	B+

Gutterfly: The Original Soundtrack is the second studio album by American hip hop group Lifesavas. It was released on April 24, 2007, through Quannum Projects with distribution via TVT Records. Recording sessions took place at The Promiseland in Portland, Accompong Compound in Oakland and Norwood's Crib in Venice Beach. Production was handled by members Jumbo the Garbageman, Rev. Shines and Vursatyl, as well as Jake One, Chief Xcel, Oh No and Vitamin D. It features guest appearances from Camp Lo, dead prez, Don Blackman, Fishbone, George Clinton, Ish, MegaNut, Smif-N-Wessun and Vernon Reid, and contributions from Ike Willis, David Walker and Chris Funk among others.

The album received generally favourable reviews from music critics. Paste magazine ranked the album No. 42 on their 'The 100 Best Albums of 2007' list. The song "Superburn" can be heard in 2010 film The Virginity Hit.

== Track listing ==
No.	Title	Writer(s)	Producer(s)	Length
1.	"Intro: Welcome to Razorblade City"	Solomon David; David Walker	Jumbo The Garbageman	0:48
2.	"Double Up"	David; Marlon Irving; Michael W. Jackson	Oh No	3:46
3.	"Gutterfly" (featuring Camp Lo)	David; Irving; Saladine Wallace; Salahadeen Wilds	Jumbo The Garbageman	4:24
4.	"No Surprise / Scene I: Fly Paper"	David; Irving; Derrick Brown	Vitamin D; Jumbo The Garbageman	4:01
5.	"Shine Language"	David; Irving; Ryan Shortell	Jumbo The Garbageman; Rev. Shines	3:59
6.	"Take Me Away"	David; Irving; Shortell	Lifesavas	3:20
7.	"A Serpent's Love / Scene II: Jimmy Slimwater's New Orleans Funeral" (featuring Ish)	David; Irving; Shortell; Xavier Mosley	Jumbo The Garbageman; Chief Xcel	5:33
8.	"Dead Ones / Scene III: Revenge" (featuring Fishbone)	David; Irving; A. Hill; Angelo Moore; John Norwood Fisher	Vursatyl; Jumbo The Garbageman	4:04
9.	"The Warning"	David; Irving	Jumbo The Garbageman	2:54
10.	"Superburn / Scene IV: Trouble"	David; Irving; Jacob Dutton	Jake One; Jumbo The Garbageman	3:44
11.	"Night Out / Scene V: Connects" (featuring George Clinton and MegaNut)	David; Irving; Dutton	Jumbo The Garbageman; Jake One	5:01
12.	"The Squeeze" (featuring Smif-N-Wessun)	David; Irving; Tekomin Williams; Darrell A. Yates Jr.; Dutton	Jake One	3:38
13.	"Long Letter" (featuring Don Blackman)	David; Irving; Donald Blackman	Jumbo The Garbageman	3:56
14.	"Freedom Walk / Scene VI: Marvelous the Mouthpiece" (featuring dead prez and Vernon Reid)	David; Irving; Clayton Gavin; Lavonne Alford	Jumbo The Garbageman	5:37
15.	"Celebrate / Finale"	David; Irving	Jumbo The Garbageman	3:42
16.	"Hidden Scene: The Legend of the Century"	David	Jumbo The Garbageman	0:38
17.	"Tailormade Razorblade"	David; Irving	Jumbo The Garbageman	2:47
Total length:				1:01:52

== Personnel ==
- Solomon "Jumbo The Garbageman" David – vocals, grand piano, Rhodes electric piano, keyboards, bass, scratches, horns arrangement, vocal arrangement, producer, recording, mixing, digital editing, executive producer
- Marlon "Vursatyl" Irving – vocals, bass, double bass, additional keyboards, vocal arrangement, recording, producer, mixing, executive producer
- Ryan "Rev. Shines" Shortell – scratches, producer, recording, mixing
- David Walker – vocals
- Saladine "Geechi Suede" Wallace – vocals
- Salahadeen "Sonny Cheeba" Wilds – vocals
- Ishmael Butler – vocals
- Ike Willis – vocals
- Wolveryne – additional vocals
- Adrienne Irving – additional vocals
- Rochelle D. Hart – additional vocals
- Ayinde Jean-Baptiste – voice
- Angelo Moore – vocals, saxophone, horns arrangement
- Lonnie "MegaNut" Marshall – vocals
- George Clinton – additional vocals
- Tekomin B. "Tek" Williams – vocals
- Darrell A. "Steele" Yates Jr. – vocals
- Don Blackman – vocals
- Irene James-Blackman – additional vocals
- Ladora Knight – additional vocals
- Leah Shephard – additional vocals, vocal arrangement
- Clayton "stic.man" Gavin – vocals
- Lavonne "M-1" Alford – vocals
- Kolesta "Choklate" Moore – vocals
- Kumari Singh – vocals
- Farnell Newton – trumpet, horns arrangement
- Chris Funk – guitar
- Sedell Jones – grand piano, Rhodes electric piano, keyboards, bass
- Dog Boy Ben – violin, viola
- The Benjamin Barnes Orchestra – violin, viola
- Jerry Harris Jr. – bass
- Andriano Giuseppe Donnaloia – guitar
- Hervé Salters – pump organ, keyboards
- John Norwood Fisher – bass, recording
- Torrey "T Swurvell" Ward – bass
- Vernon Reid – lead guitar
- DJ DV One – scratches
- Xavier "Chief Xcel" Mosley – additional drum programming, arrangement, producer, recording, executive producer, A&R
- Michael "Oh No" Jackson – producer
- Derrick "Vitamin D" Brown – producer
- Jacob "Jake One" Dutton – producer, mixing
- Mike Cresswell – mixing
- Josh Derry – mixing
- Eugene Smith – digital editing
- Eddy Schreyer – mastering
- Brent Rollins – design
- Amanda Lopez – photography
- Mike Nardone – A&R
