= Entropy / Send Them =

EP by DJ Shadow and Asia Born
- Released: 1993
- Recorded: 1992
- Genre: Alternative hip hop
- Label: Solesides
- Producer: DJ Shadow

Professional ratings
Review scores
| Source | Rating |
|---|---|
| AllMusic | 3/5 stars |

"Entropy" / "Send Them" is a double A-side EP by Asia Born (now known as Lyrics Born) and DJ Shadow and the Groove Robbers. It was released in 1993 by Solesides. "Entropy" has the full title "Entropy (Hip Hop Reconstruction from the Ground Up)" on the disc label. Parts of this were later featured on the retrospective album Solesides Greatest Bumps.

== Release ==
Following the release of several early singles on Hollywood Records, DJ Shadow then started his own imprint, Solesides, and this was the first record to be released on this label, with a track from future collaborator and fellow Quannum Projects member Asia Born. This was a 12" single, numbered "SS001", featuring DJ Shadow's 17-minute sound collage "Entropy" on one side, described as "one continuous track moving from upbeat deck-work and bin shuddering beats, through thick, downtempo head music." "Entropy" is divided into seven parts. It has been described as "the first defining moment in his (DJ Shadow's) career". DJ Shadow's style is usually made up of very short samples of other records, of which he has over 60,000.

Lyrics Born (then known as Asia Born) featured on the other side with the song, "Send Them", which received somewhat less acclaim, labelled by AllMusic as a "forgettable vehicle" for his talents.

The white-label 12" was preceded by a cassette single version of the release and both have fetched high dollars in the re-sale market. Only 400 cassettes and 200 12" vinyl singles were originally pressed up and sold on consignment in record stores in the Bay Area. It has since been very widely bootlegged, due to the initial limited run, and both artists' greater success following this. The original vinyl copies can be identified, as the 'deadwax' (the smooth part following the actual recorded part of the vinyl) is inscribed "Reconstruction Continues" on the "Entropy" side, and " For Dad" on the "Send Them" side.

== Track listing ==
=== Side A ===
1. "Send Them"
2. "Send Them" (Instrumental)
3. "Count and Estimate" (Dub)

=== Side B ===
1. "Entropy"
- a) "Intropy"
- b) "The Third Decade, Our Move"
- c) "Count & Estimate"
- d) "B-Boy's Revenge"
- e) "Back to Back Breaks"
- f) "DJ Shadow's Theme"
- g) "Endtropy"

=== Samples used in "Entropy" ===
==== b) "The Third Decade, Our Move" ====
Contains samples of:

- Jack McDuff – "Jelly Jam" (drums)
- Lou Rawls – "Stormy Monday"
- "The moonlight shines on funky city..", Blowfly – "Zodiac Blowfly (Side B)"
- "Tell 'em who the fuck I am", Style – "The Assassinator"
- "We sample beats you sue and try to fight us", Big Daddy Kane – "Young, Gifted and Black"
- "In the middle of a stable with a turntable", The 45 King – "The 900 Number (YZ Acappella Vocal)"
- "New", Steinski & Mass Media – "We'll Be Right Back"
- "Spinning on the turntables back to back", Whodini – "The Haunted House of Rock"

==== c) "Count & Estimate" ====
Contains samples of:

- Pete Rock & C.L. Smooth – "Hard to the Left Rap Party" (Dub version only)
- Don Thompson – "Just Plain Funk"
- The Meters – "Look-Ka Py Py"
- Eric B & Rakim – "Eric B Is President"
- Biz Markie – "Nobody Beats the Biz"
- "Last", Grandmaster Flash – "Freelance"
- "Count and estimate about a thousand dead", Uptown – "Dope on Plastic"
- "About 100 or more..", GangStarr – "2 Deep"
- "This was a goddamn slaughter", The Genius – "Phony as Ya Wanna Be"
- "Next thing you know you're being buried and planted", MC Shan – "Go for Yours ('Cause I'm Gonna Get Mine)"
- Skull Snaps – "I Turn My Back on Love"
- BarKays – "Street Walker"

==== d) "B-Boy's Revenge" ====
Contains samples of:

- "Do you have a motor? Show it to me..", Bright Lights – "Motor City Funk"
- "We're comin' out on the Italian tip..", from an interview with The Lordz Of Brooklyn
- "Rappin for the white man", Pharcyde – "It's Jiggaboo Time"
- "Listen up psychopath..", Master Ace – "Brooklyn Battles"
- "Please man, don't get with that bullshit", LL Cool J – "El Shabazz"
- "That ain't shit y'all", MC Shan – "I Pioneered This"
- "Fuck off", De La Soul – "Afro Connection at the Hi-Five (In the Eyes of a Hoodlum)"
- "New Jacks trying to monopolize..", Grandmixer DST – "The Home of Hip-Hop"

==== e) "Back to Back Breaks" ====
Contains samples of:

- "If a beat is not for sale then...yup we gotta have it", MC Lyte – "10% Dis"
- Les Demerle – "Moondial"
- Baby Huey – "Hard Times"
- Simtec & Wylie – "Bootleggin'"
- Wilbur Bascomb and the Zodiact – "Just Groove in 'G'"
- Bernard Purdie – "Soul Drums"

==== f) "DJ Shadow's Theme" ====
Contains samples of:

- "The stage is set..", the voice of Stan Lee
- Bob James – "Valley of the Shadows"
- Bob James – "Feel Like Making Love"
- Curtis Knight – "Hi-Low" (drums)
- Richard Roundtree – "Lovin'"
- Joe Thomas – "Chitlins and Chuchifritos" (bassline stab)
- Southside Movement – "I've Been Watching You"
- Black Heat – "Zimbaku"
- Bad Bascomb – "Woman Connoisseur"

== Personnel ==
- Josh Davis (aka DJ Shadow) – production and sampling on "Entropy" and "Count and Estimate (Dub)"
- Tom Shimura (aka Asia Born) – vocals and production on "Send Them"
