= Spectrum (Quannum album) =

Compilation album by Quannum
- Released: June 27, 1999
- Genre: Hip-hop
- Length: 57:11
- Label: Quannum
- Producer: Chief Xcel; Dan the Automator; DJ Shadow; El-P; Lyrics Born; The Soul-Saints

Quannum chronology
Spectrum (1999)	SoleSides Greatest Bumps (2000)

Professional ratings
Review scores
Source	Rating
AllMusic	4.5/5 stars
NME	8/10
Pitchfork	7.5/10
RapReviews	6.5/10
Spin	8/10
The Independent	4/5
The Village Voice	(2-star Honorable Mention)

Spectrum is the first compilation album by American hip-hop collective Quannum. It was released on June 27, 1999 via Quannum Projects, marking its first album after changing name from SoleSides. Produced by Chief Xcel, DJ Shadow, Lyrics Born, Dan the Automator, El-P and the Soul-Saints, it features guest appearances from Divine Styler, El-P, Jurassic 5 and Souls of Mischief.

== Track listing ==
No.	Title	Producer(s)	Length
1.	"Concentration" (performed by Quannum and Jurassic 5)	Lyrics Born	4:39
2.	"One of a Kind" (performed by Blackalicious)	Chief Xcel	2:57
3.	"Storm Warning" (performed by Latyrx)	DJ Shadow	5:45
4.	"Divine Intervention" (performed by Divine Styler and DJ Shadow)	DJ Shadow	4:19
5.	"Mic Break"	Chief Xcel	1:06
6.	"Golden Rule" (performed by Maroons and Erin Anova)	Chief Xcel	3:53
7.	"People Like Me" (performed by Joyo Velarde)	Lyrics Born	4:33
8.	"I Changed My Mind" (performed by Lyrics Born and The Poets of Rhythm)	The Soul-Saints	4:39
9.	"The Extravaganza" (performed by Quannum and Souls of Mischief)	Lyrics Born	6:16
10.	"Hott People" (performed by Lyrics Born)	DJ Shadow	4:27
11.	"Looking Over a City" (performed by Latyrx and El-P)	El-P; DJ Shadow (co.); Lyrics Born (co.)	4:58
12.	"Jada's Vengeance" (performed by Blackalicious, Maroons and Joyo Velarde)	Chief Xcel	3:42
13.	"Mic Break 2"		0:37
14.	"Bombonyall" (performed by Quannum)	DJ Shadow	4:20
15.	"Mic Break 3"	Dan the Automator	1:00
Total length:			57:11

== Charts ==
Chart (1999)	Peak position
UK Albums (Official Charts)	84
UK Independent Albums (Official Charts)	11
