= Droppin' Science Fiction =

Studio album by The Mighty Underdogs
- Released: October 14, 2008
- Genre: Hip hop
- Length: 48:45
- Label: Definitive Jux
- Producer: Headnodic

The Mighty Underdogs chronology
The Prelude (2007)	Droppin' Science Fiction (2008)

Singles from Droppin' Science Fiction
- 1. "Want You Back" Released: 2008

Droppin' Science Fiction is the only studio album by The Mighty Underdogs, an American hip hop group consisting of producer Headnodic and rappers Lateef the Truthspeaker and Gift of Gab. It was released by Definitive Jux on October 14, 2008. It peaked at number 50 on the Billboard Heatseekers Albums chart. The song "Gunfight" would later appear in the video game Skate 3.

== Critical reception ==
Professional ratings
Aggregate scores
Source	Rating
Metacritic	75/100
Review scores
Source	Rating
AllMusic	4/5 stars
The A.V. Club	A−
Robert Christgau	B+
Cyclic Defrost	favorable
Now	3/5
Pitchfork	4.0/10
SF Weekly	unfavorable
Slant Magazine	3/5 stars
Spin	7/10

At Metacritic, which assigns a weighted average score out of 100 to reviews from mainstream critics, the album received an average score of 75, based on 12 reviews, indicating "generally favorable reviews".

Wilson McBee of Slant Magazine gave the album 3 out of 5 stars, commenting that "Gab and Lateef are effortless spitters with buckets of clever wordplay, and Headnotic proves himself to be a worthy beatsmith and perhaps the freshest possible understudy to Madlib and J-Dilla that has arrived in some time." John Bush of AllMusic called it "the best-produced Quannum project since the original Quannum Spectrum." Nathan Rabin of The A.V. Club gave the album a grade of A−, saying: "The album concludes on a triumphant note with the ecstatic, celebratory 'Victorious,' a richly earned victory lap from a top-notch trio that's simultaneously new and reassuringly familiar."

Meanwhile, Tim Perlich of Now wrote: "The fact that they bring in their celeb friends (MF Doom, Lyrics Born, Mr. Lif, Casual, DJ Shadow, etc) for cameos on just about every track takes them even further from establishing a coherent Mighty Underdogs sound." Nate Patrin of Pitchfork gave the album a 4.0 out of 10, calling it "an unusually awkward record, one that pushes the non-threatening b-boy routine past good-natured lightheartedness into cloying silliness." Ben Westhoff of SF Weekly commented that "the Mighty Underdogs fail at their attempts to be clever or funny."

Keith Gribbins of Cleveland Scene included it on the "Top Ten Albums of the Year" list.

== Track listing ==
No.	Title	Length
1.	"Monster"	2:18
2.	"Hands in the Air"	2:07
3.	"So Sad" (featuring Julian Marley and Damian Marley)	3:12
4.	"Gunfight" (featuring MF Doom)	4:06
5.	"Ill Vacation" (featuring Lyrics Born)	3:51
6.	"Science Fiction"	3:41
7.	"Laughing at You" (featuring Casual)	2:57
8.	"Escape" (featuring Mr. Lif and Akrobatik)	3:42
9.	"Doglude"	0:52
10.	"Folks"	2:55
11.	"UFC Remix" (featuring DJ Shadow)	3:18
12.	"Want You Back"	4:06
13.	"Aye"	2:59
14.	"Warwalk" (featuring Chali 2na, Tash, Raashan Ahmad, and Zion)	4:08
15.	"Victorious"	4:30

== Charts ==
Chart	Peak position
US Heatseekers Albums (Billboard)	50
