= Imani Vol. 1 =

Studio album by Blackalicious
- Released: September 18, 2015
- Genre: Hip-hop
- Length: 56:58
- Label: OGM
- Producer: Chief Xcel

Blackalicious chronology
The Craft (2005)	Imani Vol. 1 (2015)

Imani Vol. 1 is the fourth and final studio album by American hip-hop duo Blackalicious. It was released on September 18, 2015, after a decade-long hiatus since their previous album, The Craft. The title of the album means "faith" in Swahili, and it is the first part of what was a planned trilogy of albums before Timothy Parker died of kidney failure in 2021. Work began on the album in 2012, with the making of the album being crowdfunded via the website Pledgemusic.

== Critical reception ==
Professional ratings
Aggregate scores
Source	Rating
Metacritic	75/100
Review scores
Source	Rating
The A.V. Club	B
The Guardian	3/5 stars
Paste	7.3/10
Pitchfork	7.2/10
PopMatters	7/10 stars

At Metacritic, which assigns a weighted average score out of 100 to reviews from mainstream critics, the album received an average score of 75, based on 7 reviews, indicating "generally favorable reviews".

== Track listing ==
No.	Title	Length
1.	"Faith" (featuring Amde of The Watts Prophets)	1:23
2.	"Blacka"	2:43
3.	"Ashes to Ashes"	3:28
4.	"On Fire Tonight" (featuring Myron of Myron & E)	2:40
5.	"Escape"	4:40
6.	"The Sun" (featuring Imani Coppola)	3:26
7.	"That Night" (featuring Vursatyl and Jumbo of Lifesavas)	5:54
8.	"Inspired By" (featuring Bosko)	3:29
9.	"We Did It Again" (featuring Danielle Flax)	3:55
10.	"I Like the Way You Talk"	2:30
11.	"Twist of Time"	3:12
12.	"The Blow Up"	4:01
13.	"Love's Gonna Save the Day" (featuring Fantastic Negrito)	3:13
14.	"Alpha and Omega" (featuring Lateef, Lyrics Born, Monophonics, and DJ D Sharp)	5:31
15.	"The Hour Glass"	3:22
16.	"Imani" (featuring Zap Mama)	3:31
Total length:		56:58

== Charts ==
Chart	Peak position
US Independent Albums (Billboard)	39
US Top R&B/Hip-Hop Albums (Billboard)	28
US Top Rap Albums (Billboard)	21
