= Everywhere at Once =

Everywhere at Once may refer to:

- Everywhere at Once (The Plimsouls album), 1983
- Everywhere at Once (Lyrics Born album), 2008
- Everywhere at Once, a 2013 album by Paul Allen and the Underthinkers
- Everywhere at Once, a 2017 mixtape by Bobby Creekwater
- Everywhere at Once (film), a 2008 film co-directed by Peter Lindbergh and Holly Fisher
