= The Next Logical Progression =

Studio album by Gift of Gab
- Released: March 27, 2012
- Genre: Hip-hop
- Length: 38:16
- Label: Quannum
- Producer: G Koop; Headnodic

Gift of Gab chronology
Escape 2 Mars (2009)	The Next Logical Progression (2012)	Finding Inspiration Somehow (2021)

The Next Logical Progression is the third solo studio album by American rapper Gift of Gab. It was released on March 27, 2012, via Quannum Projects. Produced by G Koop and Headnodic, it features guest appearances from George Clinton, Latyrx, Martian Luther, Ms. K, Raashan Ahmad, Samantha Kravitz and Zumbi.

== Critical reception ==
Professional ratings
Aggregate scores
Source	Rating
Metacritic	71/100
Review scores
Source	Rating
AllMusic	4/5 stars
HipHopDX	3.5/5
Paste	4.5/10
PopMatters	7/10
Spin	7/10
Tiny Mix Tapes	2/5 marks

The Next Logical Progression was met with generally favourable reviews from music critics. At Metacritic, which assigns a normalized rating out of 100 to reviews from mainstream publications, the album received an average score of 71, based on nine reviews.

AllMusic's David Jeffries praised the album, stating "a spoonful of sugar helps the medicine go down, which is the great trick behind this persuasive album, offering a serious argument with plenty of hot buttered soul". Slava Kuperstein of HipHopDX resumed: "Gift of Gab is a craftsman, and achieves goal to provide uplifting music". Justin Cober-Lake of PopMatters noted that "it might not be miraculous, but The Next Logical Progression is certainly an inspired work".

In mixed reviews, Marcus J. Moore of Paste claimed the album "doesn't make a convincing argument for rap's return to the golden era. Instead, it feels a bit too grumpy and too reliant upon the good ol' days". Tiny Mix Tapes reviewer called the album an "evidence of a serious identity crisis".

== Track listing ==
No.	Title	Producer(s)	Length
1.	"NLP"	G Koop	2:16
2.	"Introlude"	Headnodic	1:22
3.	"Rise" (featuring Raashan Ahmad and Zumbi)	G Koop	4:02
4.	"Protocol" (featuring Samantha Kravitz)	G Koop	2:58
5.	"Everything Is Fine" (featuring George Clinton and Latyrx)	G Koop	4:32
6.	"Toxic" (featuring Martian Luther)	G Koop	3:33
7.	"Wack But Good People"	G Koop	2:53
8.	"Effed Up"	G Koop	3:32
9.	"Market & 8th"	G Koop	2:53
10.	"Dream Warrior" (featuring Ms. K)	G Koop	3:48
11.	"So So Much"	Headnodic	3:16
12.	"Beyond Logic"	G Koop	3:11
Total length:			38:16
