= Firewire (Lateef the Truthspeaker album) =

Studio album by Lateef the Truthspeaker
- Released: November 8, 2011
- Studio: Oakland, California
- Genre: Hip hop
- Length: 47:18
- Label: Quannum Projects
- Producers: Chief Xcel, Dan the Automator, DJ Shadow, Headnodic

Lateef the Truthspeaker chronology
Truth at Sea (2011)	Firewire (2011)

Professional ratings
Review scores
Source	Rating
The Agit Reader	mixed
AllMusic	3.5/5 stars
The Music	favorable
Okayplayer	80/100
Spin	6/10

Firewire is the debut solo studio album by American hip hop artist Lateef the Truthspeaker. It was released via Quannum Projects on November 8, 2011. Recorded over the course of four months in Oakland, California, it includes contributions from DJ Shadow, Lyrics Born, Del the Funky Homosapien, and Dan the Automator.

== Critical reception ==
D.L. Chandler of Okayplayer gave the album an 80 out of 100, calling it "an eclectic mix of tracks that showcase Lateef's formidable ability but underwhelms briefly at points." He added, "Firewire may not ignite the senses of every rap fan, but there are enough twists in turns even in its rote moments that keep the listeners engaged over the duration of the album." Mosi Reeves of Spin gave the album a 6 out of 10, saying, "Firewire is chaotically sequenced, like the Bay Area rapper scoured his hard drive for usable material without checking whether the songs actually blended together logically." Tom Birts of The Music said, "Firewire showcases the energy and versatility of an emcee and singer who rattles through hip hop, soul and electro-pop without pause or cause to doubt himself."

== Track listing ==
No.	Title	Producer	Length
1.	"Let's Get Up"	Chief Xcel	2:59
2.	"Firewire Interlude"		1:06
3.	"Oakland" (featuring Del the Funky Homosapien & The Grouch)		4:19
4.	"Only Thought"		3:46
5.	"We the People"	Chief Xcel	2:43
6.	"Heckuvit"	Headnodic	3:40
7.	"Hardship Enterprise" (featuring Lyrics Born)		3:59
8.	"So Sexy"		3:27
9.	"Testimony"		3:45
10.	"Left Alone"	Dan the Automator	3:33
11.	"Say What You Want"	DJ Shadow	4:06
12.	"Sara"		3:57
13.	"Inside You"		5:58
