= Troublemakers (French band) =

French electronic music band

Troublemakers, is an electronic music band from Marseille. It was formed by Fred Berthet, Lionel Corsini (DJ Oil), and Arnaud Taillefer.

== Discography ==
=== Albums ===
- Doubts & Convictions (Guidance Recordings, 2001)
1. "Street Preacher"
2. "Too Old To Die"
3. "Noces Africaines"
4. "Awake"
5. "Get Misunderstood"
6. "Electrorloge"
7. "Fatigue Universelle"
8. "Chez Roger Boite Funk"
9. "Hum Hum"
10. "Groover Is Back"
11. "Black City"
12. "Afghan" - bonus track, not included on US edition
13. "Too Old To Die" (remix by Geisha) - bonus track, not included on US edition
- Express Way (Blue Note, 2004) : both a short film and a film score
  - CD 1
  1. "Everyday is just an extension of yesterday"
  2. "V 72"
  3. "Le bocal"
  4. "All we love"
  5. "Everywhere is my home" (feat. The Gift Of Gab from Blackalicious)
  6. "County Farm"
  7. "Highway Blues"
  8. "Lemon"
  9. "Shadows Lights..."
  10. "And Music everywhere" (feat. The Gift Of Gab from Blackalicious)
  11. "I could see"
  12. "If you arrest me"
  13. "Call and Response"
  14. "God bless Billie"
  15. "Race Records" (feat. The Gift Of Gab from Blackalicious)
  16. "Lester Young in Eternity Blowing his horn alone"
  - DVD 2
  1. "Express Way" (short film)

=== DJ mix albums ===
- Stereo Pictures Vol. 02 (MK2 Music, 2003)
1. Yusef Lateef - "Passacaglia"
2. Arnaud Taillefer - "Tension"
3. Eddie Kendricks - "My People... Hold On"
4. François de Roubaix - "La fête des deux avions"
5. K-Hand - "Roots"
6. Rahsaan Roland Kirk - "Ain't no sunshine"
7. The Isolationist (DJ Vadim) - "Sensory Deprivation"
8. Nina Simone - "See-line woman"
9. Paul Hunter - "Reflection"
10. Donald Byrd - "Wilford's gone"
11. Yesterday's New Quintet (Madlib) - "Hot Water"
12. The Last Poets - "The courtroom / album at last"
13. L.B. Thomas - "Red Wine"
14. Jonzun Crew - "Pack Jam remix"
15. Funki Porcini - "The big sea"
- My Playlist (Wagram Music, 2007)
