= Alphabet Aerobics =

Song by Blackalicious

Song by Blackalicious

from the EP A2G
- Released: 1999
- Genre: Hip hop
- Length: 2:13
- Label: Quannum Projects
- Songwriters: Timothy Parker; Lucas MacFadden
- Producer: Cut Chemist

"Alphabet Aerobics" is a song by American hip hop duo Blackalicious from their EP A2G (1999). It is performed by Gift of Gab and produced by Cut Chemist.

== Composition ==
The beat of the song, built from a "spare mid-tempo thump" and electronic sound, progressively increases in tempo throughout the track. Lyrically, Gift of Gab performs in alliterative couplets through alphabetical order.

== Critical reception ==
Stanton Swihart of AllMusic described the song as "an impressive concert staple and showcase for the constantly brilliant Gift of Gab, one of the very finest MCs to ever pick up a microphone." He further stated that while Cut Chemist's production "is as innovative as hip-hop gets, he is trumped by Gift of Gab", and regarding Gift of Gab's performance, "By the time he hits x, y, and z, he is spitting out lyrics with astonishing verbal virtuosity."

== In popular culture ==
On October 28, 2014, English actor Daniel Radcliffe performed the song on The Tonight Show Starring Jimmy Fallon after being challenged by host Jimmy Fallon, who called it "one of the trickiest, fastest songs I know." This introduced the song to a wider audience, leading it to be recited throughout media outlets in various contexts. For example, an Odessa, Texas local reporter recited the lyrics on live television. In an ad campaign for YouTube Music, a student raps the song while walking down the school corridor. Blackalicious also reworked the song with sports-themed lyrics for Bleacher Report.
