= The Craft (album) =

Studio album by Blackalicious
- Released: September 27, 2005
- Genre: Hip-hop
- Length: 58:11
- Label: Anti-
- Producer: Chief Xcel

Blackalicious chronology
Blazing Arrow (2002)	The Craft (2005)	Imani Vol. 1 (2015)

Singles from The Craft
- 1. "Your Move" Released: 2005; 2. "Powers" Released: 2006

The Craft is the third studio album by American hip-hop duo Blackalicious. It was released on Anti- on September 27, 2005. Chief Xcel said, "The Craft is our passion to bring discipline to this music, the passion to keep growing, keep stretching, keep doing things we haven't before." It peaked at number 102 on the Billboard 200 chart. As of 2015, it has sold 67,000 copies in the US.

== Critical reception ==
Professional ratings
Aggregate scores
Source	Rating
Metacritic	80/100
Review scores
Source	Rating
AllMusic	4/5 stars
Alternative Press	4/5 stars
Christgau’s Consumer Guide	A−
The Guardian	3/5 stars
HipHopDX	4/5
Pitchfork	7.4/10
PopMatters	9/10
Q	4/5 stars
RapReviews	10/10
Stylus	B

At Metacritic, which assigns a weighted average score out of 100 to reviews from mainstream critics, the album received an average score of 80, based on 22 reviews, indicating "generally favorable reviews".

Jack Booty of Prefix gave the album a 7.0 out of 10, saying, "[Chief] Xcel's production doesn't stray very far from its R&B and soul influences, but this time it comes without almost any samples, relying sometimes on players from a homebrewed funk band to create clearance-free beats instead."

Exclaim! placed it at number 6 on the "Hip-Hop: Year in Review 2005" list.

== Track listing ==
No.	Title	Writer(s)	Length
1.	"World of Vibrations" (featuring Ledisi)	X. Mosley; T. Parker	5:02
2.	"Supreme People"	S. Martel; Mosley; Parker; H. Salters; V. Ségal; T. Underdue	4:03
3.	"Rhythm Sticks"	Mosley; Parker	4:36
4.	"Powers"	Martel; Mosley; Parker; Salters; Ségal; Underdue	3:47
5.	"Your Move" (featuring Lifesavas)	Mosley; Parker	3:55
6.	"Lotus Flower" (featuring George Clinton)	Martel; Mosley; Parker; Salters; Ségal; Underdue	4:12
7.	"My Pen and Pad"	Mosley; Parker	2:02
8.	"Side to Side" (featuring Lateef and Pigeon John)	L. Daumont; J. Dust; Mosley; Parker	4:36
9.	"Automatique" (featuring Floetry)	M. Ambrosius; Mosley; Parker; N. Stewart	4:07
10.	"The Fall and Rise of Elliot Brown"	F. Leaneir; Mosley; Parker	3:55
11.	"Black Diamonds and Pearls" (featuring Ledisi and Larry Saunders)	Mosley; Parker	4:22
12.	"Give It to You" (featuring Kween and Lyrics Born)	Mosley; Parker; T. Shimura	3:51
13.	"Ego Sonic War Drums" (featuring P.E.A.C.E.)	M. Davis; Martel; Mosley; Parker; Salters; Ségal	5:57
14.	"The Craft"	Mosley, Parker	3:46
Total length:			58:11

== Charts ==
Chart	Peak position
US Billboard 200	102
US Independent Albums (Billboard)	5
US Top R&B/Hip-Hop Albums (Billboard)	79
