= Same !@$ Different Day =

Same !@#$ Different Day

Compilation album by Lyrics Born
- Released: April 26, 2005
- Genre: Hip hop
- Length: 57:37
- Label: Quannum Projects
- Producers: Lyrics Born, Jumbo, Dan the Automator, Young Einstein, Stereo MC's, Halou, DJ Shadow, Chief Xcel, The Poets of Rhythm, Morcheeba, Capricorn II, DJ Spinna

Lyrics Born chronology
Later That Day (2003)	Same !@#$ Different Day (2005)	Everywhere at Once (2008)

Singles from Same !@#$ Different Day
- 1. "Callin' Out Remix" / "Do That There" Released: 2004; 2. "I'm Just Raw" / "Pack Up Remix" Released: 2005

Same !@#$ Different Day is a compilation album by Lyrics Born. It was released on Quannum Projects in 2005. It peaked at number 27 on the Billboard Heatseekers Albums chart, as well as number 28 on the Independent Albums chart.

== Release ==
As well as containing new tracks, Same !@#$ Different Day contains new lyrics over remixed beats from Lyrics Born's 2003 debut album, Later That Day. Some versions of the album includes a bonus DVD, featuring music videos, a documentary, and footage from the 2004 tour.

== Critical reception ==
Professional ratings
Review scores
Source	Rating
AllMusic	4/5 stars
Christgau's Consumer Guide	A−
Exclaim!	favorable
IGN	9.2/10
Paste	favorable
PopMatters	7/10 stars

Dave Dierksen of PopMatters gave the album 7 stars out of 10, saying: "This is the sound of soul, and it's what's been missing for far too long in hip-hop." Vish Khanna of Exclaim! called it "an essential album for both old and new fans of Lyrics Born."

== Track listing ==
No.	Title	Producer(s)	Length
1.	"Intro"	Lyrics Born	0:48
2.	"Hello Remix"	Jumbo	3:17
3.	"Pack Up Remix" (featuring Evidence and KRS-One)	Jumbo	4:07
4.	"I'm Just Raw"	Dan the Automator	4:15
5.	"Do That There (The Young Einstein Hoo-Hoo Mix)"	Young Einstein	3:24
6.	"I Changed My Mind (Stereo MC's Rattlesnake Mix)"	Stereo MC's	4:30
7.	"Bad Dreams Interlude"	Lyrics Born	0:30
8.	"Shake It Off (Bad Dreams Part II)"	Lyrics Born	4:27
9.	"The Last Trumpet (Halou Remix)" (featuring Lateef the Truth Speaker and DJ Shadow)	Halou	5:03
10.	"Over You" (featuring Joyo Velarde)	DJ Shadow	4:16
11.	"I Can't Wait for Your Love (Limited Time Offer)" (featuring Joyo Velarde)	Chief Xcel	4:21
12.	"The Bay" (featuring C. Holiday and The Poets of Rhythm)	Lyrics Born, The Poets of Rhythm	4:32
13.	"Callin' Out Remix" (featuring E-40 and Casual)	Lyrics Born	3:49
14.	"Outro"	Lyrics Born	1:31
15.	"Stop Complaining (Morcheeba/Capricorn II Remix)"	Morcheeba, Capricorn II	3:37
16.	"I Changed My Mind (DJ Spinna Remix)"	DJ Spinna	5:10

== Charts ==
Chart (2005)	Peak position
US Heatseekers Albums (Billboard)	27
US Independent Albums (Billboard)	28
