= Lateef and the Chief =

American hip-hop group

- Also known as: Maroons
- Origin: California, United States
- Genre: Hip-hop
- Years active: 1997–2005
- Labels: Quannum Projects, Epitaph Records
- Members: Lateef the Truthspeaker; Chief Xcel

Lateef and the Chief (sometimes stylized as Lateef & the Chief) was an American hip-hop group from California. Originally known as Maroons, it consists of rapper Lateef the Truthspeaker (of Latyrx) and producer Chief Xcel (of Blackalicious). In 2004, the duo released their debut album, Maroons: Ambush.

== Members ==
- Lateef the Truthspeaker (Lateef Daumont) – rapper
- Chief Xcel (Xavier Mosley) – producer

== Discography ==
Albums

- Maroons: Ambush (2004)

Singles

- "Lester Hayes" (2002)
- "Best of Me" (2004)
