= Blazing Arrow =

Studio album by Blackalicious
- Released: April 30, 2002
- Genre: Hip-hop
- Length: 74:24
- Labels: MCA, Quannum Projects
- Producers: Chief Xcel; Questlove; DJ Shadow; Hi-Tek; Ben Harper; Cut Chemist

Blackalicious chronology
Nia (1999)	Blazing Arrow (2002)	The Craft (2005)

Singles from Blazing Arrow
- 1. "Paragraph President / Passion" Released: 2001; 2. "Make You Feel That Way / Sky Is Falling" Released: 2002

Blazing Arrow is the second studio album by American hip-hop duo Blackalicious. It was released on MCA Records on April 30, 2002. It peaked at number 49 on the Billboard 200 chart.

== Critical reception ==
Professional ratings
Review scores
Source	Rating
AllMusic	4.5/5 stars
Blender	4/5 stars
Entertainment Weekly	A−
The Guardian	4/5 stars
Los Angeles Times	3/4 stars
NME	6/10
Pitchfork	9.3/10
Q	4/5 stars
Rolling Stone	4/5 stars
Spin	6/10

Steve Huey of AllMusic wrote: "All the pieces add up to not just one of the best rap albums of 2002, but one of the richest, most captivating albums to emerge from hip-hop's artsy new underground." Chris Dahlen of Pitchfork called it "one of those classic summer albums that crams in so much sound and so much life that listening to it is like going to a block party, all-day concert and a family reunion all at the same time."

Pitchfork placed it at number 46 on the "Top 50 Albums of 2002" list. Exclaim! listed it as one of the Top Ten albums of 2002. Kludge included it on their list of best albums of 2002.

== Track listing ==
No.	Title	Producer(s)	Length
1.	"Introduction: Bow and Fire"	Chief Xcel	1:06
2.	"Blazing Arrow"	Chief Xcel	2:40
3.	"Sky Is Falling"	Chief Xcel	2:26
4.	"First in Flight" (featuring Gil Scott-Heron)	Chief Xcel	4:32
5.	"Green Light: Now Begin"	Chief Xcel	3:12
6.	"4000 Miles" (featuring Chali 2na and Lateef the Truthspeaker)	Chief Xcel	4:35
7.	"Nowhere Fast" (featuring Tenashus)	Chief Xcel; Ahmir "Questlove" Thompson	6:41
8.	"Paragraph President"	Chief Xcel; DJ Shadow	5:09
9.	"It's Going Down" (featuring Lateef the Truthspeaker and Keke Wyatt)	Chief Xcel; Hi-Tek	3:44
10.	"Make You Feel That Way"	Chief Xcel	3:26
11.	"Brain Washers" (featuring Ben Harper)	Chief Xcel; Ben Harper and the Innocent Criminals	6:22
12.	"Chemical Calisthenics" (featuring Cut Chemist)	Cut Chemist	3:21
13.	"Aural Pleasure" (featuring Jaguar Wright and Lifesavas)	Chief Xcel	4:47
14.	"Passion" (featuring Rakaa and DJ Babu)	Chief Xcel	3:54
15.	"Purest Love"	Chief Xcel	4:03
16.	"Release" (featuring Zack de la Rocha, Saul Williams, Lyrics Born, and Sela Kerr)	Chief Xcel	9:26
17.	"Day One"	Chief Xcel	4:52
Total length:			74:24

== Charts ==
=== Weekly charts ===
Chart	Peak position
Australian Albums (ARIA Charts)	84
US Billboard 200	49
US Top R&B/Hip-Hop Albums (Billboard)	33

=== Year-end charts ===
Chart (2002)	Position
Canadian R&B Albums (Nielsen SoundScan)	97
Canadian Rap Albums (Nielsen SoundScan)	52
