= I'm the Best =

I'm the Best may refer to:

- I'm the Best, a 1991 book by Marjorie W. Sharmat
- "I'm the Best", a 1999 song from the Indian film Phir Bhi Dil Hai Hindustani
- "I'm the Best", a 2010 song by Nicki Minaj from the album Pink Friday
- "I'm the Best (Funky Fresh in the Flesh)", a 2010 song by Lyrics Born from the album As U Were
- "I Am the Best", a 2011 song by 2NE1

== See also ==
- "You're the Best", a 1984 song by Joe Esposito
