= Everywhere at Once (Lyrics Born album) =

Studio album by Lyrics Born
- Released: March 18, 2008
- Studios: Studio with a View (San Francisco Bay Area, CA); Studio Chocula (San Francisco, CA); The Corner Store (Berkeley, CA); The Blap Room; Malay's Crib; The Band Room (Oakland, CA); Megasonic (Oakland, CA)
- Genre: Hip-hop
- Length: 55:56
- Label: ANTI-
- Producers: AmpLive; Jake One; Kat Ouano; Lyrics Born; Trackademicks

Lyrics Born chronology
Same !@#$ Different Day (2005)	Everywhere at Once (2008)	As U Were (2010)

Everywhere at Once is the second solo studio album by Japanese-American rapper Lyrics Born. It was released on March 18, 2008, via ANTI-. The recording sessions took place at Studio with a View in San Francisco Bay Area, at Studio Chocula in San Francisco, at The Corner Store in Berkeley, at The Blap Room, at Malay's Crib, and at The Band Room and at Megasonic Sound in Oakland. Produced by Lyrics Born, Jake One, Trackademicks, AmpLive, and Kat Ouano, it features guest appearances from Joyo Velarde, Myron Glasper, Baby Jaymes, B'nai, Chali 2na, C-Holiday, DJ D-Sharp, and Trackademicks.

In the United States, the album debuted at number 192 on the Billboard 200, number 32 on the Independent Albums and number 11 on the Heatseekers Albums charts.

== Critical reception ==
Professional ratings
Aggregate scores
Source	Rating
Metacritic	66/100
Review scores
Source	Rating
AllMusic	2.5/5 stars
The A.V. Club	B
Robert Christgau	(2-star Honorable Mention)
Now	4/5 Ns
Pitchfork	7.8/10
PopMatters	8/10
RapReviews	8/10
Spin	3/5 stars

Everywhere at Once was met with generally favourable reviews from music critics. At Metacritic, which assigns a normalized rating out of 100 to reviews from mainstream publications, the album received an average score of 66 based on seventeen reviews.

Addi Stewart of Now described the album as "these 18 selections feel like the intersection where Del the Funky Homosapien meets Parliament, while Lyrics offers life-affirming couplets in his comedic drawl". Alan Ranta of PopMatters called it "an improvement over his debut from start to finish". Patrick Taylor of RapReviews concluded: "like Big Boi and André 3000, Lyrics Born is on a mission to expand the boundaries of the genre. He doesn't always succeed, and the result is an album that is a little inconsistent, but it is damn good more often than not". Nate Patrin of Pitchfork stated: "with only two weak tracks and some deletable skits outweighed by a dozen good-to-great cuts, Everywhere at Once is one of the best albums to come from a SoleSides alumnus in a long time". Michaelangelo Matos of The A.V. Club resumed: "like any party, it loses steam toward the end, but it's worth attending for at least a while".

In mixed reviews, Keith Harris of Spin declared "the result is less an uncommonly danceable indie-rap disc than it is an uncommonly thoughtful groove album". AllMusic's Marisa Brown wrote: "Everywhere at Once is reminiscent of what's already been done, either by the rapper himself or by another artist, almost derivative of itself, and as a whole, altogether disappointing".

== Track listing ==
No.	Title	Writer(s)	Producer(s)	Length
1.	"Intro Tag"	Tsutomu Shimura	Lyrics Born	0:05
2.	"Don't Change" (featuring Myron Glasper and DJ D-Sharp)	Shimura; Kat Ouano	Lyrics Born	3:23
3.	"Hott 2 Deff" (featuring Chali 2na and Joyo Velarde)	Shimura; Charles Stewart; Anthony Anderson; Adam Theis	AmpLive; Lyrics Born	3:12
4.	"Differences" (featuring Joyo Velarde and B'nai)	Shimura; Jacob Dutton; James Ryan Ho	Jake One; Lyrics Born	3:59
5.	"Cakewalk" (featuring Trackademicks and Baby Jaymes)	Shimura; Jason Valerio	Trackademicks; Lyrics Born	3:46
6.	"Shoe Hoes Anonymous" (Skit)	Shimura	Lyrics Born	1:23
7.	"I'm a Phreak"	Shimura; Ramble Krohn; Ouano	Lyrics Born	3:24
8.	"I Like It, I Love It"	Shimura; B'nai Rebelfront; Uriah Duffy	Lyrics Born	3:42
9.	"The World Is Calling" (featuring Joyo Velarde)	Shimura; Joyo Velarde	Trackademicks; Lyrics Born	3:49
10.	"Top Shelf (Anything U Want)"	Shimura; Ouano	Lyrics Born; Kat Ouano	4:02
11.	"Is It the Skin I'm In?" (featuring Myron Glasper)	Shimura; Jan Weissenfeldt; Max Weissenfeldt; Boris Geiger; Ouano; Theis	Lyrics Born	3:53
12.	"Homeland Security" (Skit)	Shimura	Lyrics Born	1:25
13.	"Do U Buy It?"	Shimura	Lyrics Born	3:11
14.	"Rules Were Meant to Be Broken"	Shimura	Lyrics Born	4:07
15.	"Whispers" (featuring C-Holiday)	Shimura; Ouano; Theis; B. T. Express; Velarde	Lyrics Born	4:41
16.	"I Can't Decide (Everywhere at Once)" (featuring Myron Glasper)	Shimura; Dutton	Jake One; Lyrics Born	4:03
17.	"Re-Intro"	Shimura	Lyrics Born	0:57
18.	"Let Me In, Let Me Out" (Remix)	Shimura; Tommy Guerrero	Count; Lyrics Born	2:54
Total length:				55:56

== Charts ==
Chart (2008)	Peak position
Australian Albums (ARIA)	94
US Billboard 200	192
US Independent Albums (Billboard)	32
US Heatseekers Albums (Billboard)	11
