= A2G =

EP by Blackalicious
- Released: April 30, 1999
- Genre: Hip hop
- Length: 24:46
- Label: Quannum Projects
- Producer: Chief Xcel, Cut Chemist

Blackalicious chronology
Melodica (1994)	A2G (1999)	Nia (1999)

A2G is an EP by American hip hop duo Blackalicious. It was originally released on Quannum Projects in 1999. It peaked at number 21 on the UK Independent Albums Chart.

The EP contains the tongue-twisting song "Alphabet Aerobics", which actor Daniel Radcliffe recited on The Tonight Show Starring Jimmy Fallon in 2014.

== Critical reception ==
Professional ratings
Review scores
Source	Rating
AllMusic	4/5 stars
The New Rolling Stone Album Guide	3.5/5 stars

Stanton Swihart of AllMusic praised "Alphabet Aerobics". He additionally wrote that Gift of Gab "barely outshines Chief Xcel, who, par for course with the entire Quannum Projects crew, loads the music with clever samples and newfangled beats (especially on the funk-laced 'Clockwork') to keep things ever-inventive."

== Track listing ==
No.	Title	Producer(s)	Length
1.	"A to G"	Chief Xcel	2:27
2.	"Clockwork"	Chief Xcel	4:31
3.	"Rock the Spot"	Chief Xcel	4:20
4.	"Back to the Essence" (featuring Lateef)	Chief Xcel	3:33
5.	"Deception"	Chief Xcel	4:36
6.	"Making Progress"	Chief Xcel	3:12
7.	"Alphabet Aerobics" (The Cut Chemist 2 ½ Minute Workout)	Cut Chemist	2:13
Total length:			24:46

== Charts ==
Chart	Peak position
UK Independent Albums (OCC)	21
