= 4th Dimensional Rocketships Going Up =

Studio album by Gift of Gab
- Released: May 11, 2004
- Genre: Hip hop
- Length: 46:55
- Labels: Quannum Projects, Epitaph
- Producers: Jake One, Vitamin D, Samson

Gift of Gab chronology
4th Dimensional Rocketships Going Up (2004)	Escape 2 Mars (2009)

Singles from 4th Dimensional Rocketships Going Up
- 1. "The Writz / Just Because" Released: 2003; 2. "Rat Race / Real MCs" Released: 2004

4th Dimensional Rocketships Going Up is the first solo studio album by American rapper Gift of Gab. It was released on Quannum Projects and Epitaph Records on May 11, 2004.

== Critical reception ==
Professional ratings
Review scores
Source	Rating
AllMusic	4/5 stars
The A.V. Club	favorable
HipHopDX	4.0/5
Pitchfork	5.9/10
PopMatters	unfavorable
RapReviews	9/10
Undercover Magazine	7/10

John Bush of AllMusic said, "4th Dimensional Rocketships Going Up delivers what every fan wants to hear: more quality material from one of the best underground rappers in the business." Nathan Rabin of The A.V. Club called it "an album that's simultaneously epic and intimate, personal and political, passionate and playful."

== Track listing ==
No.	Title	Producer(s)	Length
1.	"The Ride of Your Life"	Jake One	2:59
2.	"Rat Race"	Jake One	2:52
3.	"Way of the Light"	Vitamin D	4:24
4.	"Stardust"	Vitamin D	3:17
5.	"Flashback"	Jake One	3:05
6.	"Up"	Jake One	1:55
7.	"The Writz"	Vitamin D	3:47
8.	"To Know You"	Jake One, Vitamin D	3:26
9.	"Real MCs" (featuring Vursatyl)	Vitamin D	4:02
10.	"Hold On"	Jake One	1:02
11.	"In a Minute Doe"	Jake One, Samson	2:59
12.	"Evolution"	Jake One	2:55
13.	"Moonshine"	Jake One	4:01
14.	"Ride On"	Vitamin D	2:30
15.	"Just Because"	Vitamin D	3:33

== Charts ==
Chart	Peak position
US Heatseekers Albums (Billboard)	20
US Independent Albums (Billboard)	19
