= Nia (album) =

Studio album by Blackalicious
- Released: August 30, 1999
- Genre: Progressive rap
- Length: 74:10
- Labels: Mo' Wax, Quannum Projects
- Producers: Chief Xcel, Lyrics Born, DJ Shadow

Blackalicious chronology
A2G (1999)	Nia (1999)	Blazing Arrow (2002)

Singles from Nia
- 1. "Deception" Released: 1999; 2. "If I May / Reanimation" Released: 2000

Nia is the debut studio album by American hip-hop duo Blackalicious. It was released in Europe by Mo' Wax on August 30, 1999, and re-released in the United States by Quannum Projects on February 29, 2000, with a slightly altered track listing.

== Critical reception ==
Professional ratings
Review scores
Source	Rating
AllMusic	4.5/5 stars
Alternative Press	4/5
Entertainment Weekly	A−
Muzik	4/5 stars
NME	6/10
Pitchfork	7.3/10
Rolling Stone	3/5 stars
The Rolling Stone Album Guide	4/5 stars
Spin	8/10
The Village Voice	A−

John Bush of AllMusic called Nia "an album that stakes the claim of Chief Xcel and Gift of Gab as not only the best pair of rappers in the underground, but also the best pair of producers." Patrick Jones of PopMatters commented that it "renews your faith in the power and potential of hip-hop." Nathan Rabin of The A.V. Club said, "Blackalicious' work will strike some listeners as hopelessly naïve and New Age-ish, but Nia is nevertheless an audacious, uncompromised, enormously promising album by a group with the courage to disregard hip-hop's codes and unwritten rules to create music that is vitally, distinctly its own." Exclaim!'s Del F. Cowie praised the album's "superior conceptual execution and soulful statement".

NME placed it at number 45 on the "101 Albums to Hear Before You Die" list.

== Track listing ==
No.	Title	Producer(s)	Length
1.	"Searching" (featuring Erinn Anova)	Chief Xcel	1:50
2.	"The Fabulous Ones"	Chief Xcel	3:00
3.	"Do This My Way" (featuring Lyrics Born)	Lyrics Born	4:49
4.	"Deception"	Chief Xcel	5:19
5.	"A to G"	Chief Xcel	2:24
6.	"Cliff Hanger"	DJ Shadow	6:21
7.	"Shallow Days"	Chief Xcel	4:20
8.	"Ego Trip by Nikki Giovanni" (featuring Nikki Giovanni and Erinn Anova)	Chief Xcel	1:44
9.	"You Didn't Know That Though"	Chief Xcel	4:35
10.	"If I May" (featuring Erinn Anova and Lateef)	Chief Xcel	3:45
11.	"Dream Seasons"	Chief Xcel	4:49
12.	"Trouble (Eve of Destruction)"	Chief Xcel	4:28
13.	"Smithzonian Institute of Rhyme" (featuring Lateef)	Chief Xcel	4:25
14.	"As the World Turns" (featuring Erinn Anova)	Chief Xcel	5:42
15.	"Reanimation"	Chief Xcel	3:39
16.	"Beyonder"	Chief Xcel	4:05
17.	"Making Progress"	Chief Xcel	3:11
18.	"Sleep"	Chief Xcel	3:54
19.	"Finding" (featuring Erinn Anova)	Chief Xcel	1:50
Total length:			74:10

== Charts ==
Chart	Peak position
US Heatseekers Albums (Billboard)	50
US Independent Albums (Billboard)	29
