= Melodica (EP) =

- German pressing artwork

EP by Blackalicious
- Released: 1994
- Genre: Hip hop
- Length: 34:48
- Label: Solesides
- Producer: Chief Xcel, DJ Shadow

Blackalicious chronology
Melodica (1994)	A2G (1999)

Melodica is the debut EP by American hip hop duo Blackalicious. It was originally released on Solesides in 1994. It was reissued digitally in 2012 with an additional bonus track "Change".

== Critical reception ==
Professional ratings
Review scores
Source	Rating
AllMusic	3/5 stars
Melody Maker	favorable
Pitchfork	7.5/10

Lee Meyer of AllMusic gave the EP 3 stars out of 5, calling it "an admirable effort that gives a glimpse of the group's potential." Nate Patrin of Pitchfork gave the EP a 7.5 out of 10, saying: "This is conscious-minded, lyrically technical underground hip-hop at its rawest and, sometimes, at its most over-the-top ridiculous."

In 2015, Fact placed it at number 69 on the "100 Best Indie Hip-Hop Records of All Time" list.

== Track listing ==
Solesides edition (1994)
No.	Title	Producer(s)	Length
1.	"Lyric Fathom"	Chief Xcel	4:15
2.	"Rhymes for the Deaf, Dumb and Blind"	DJ Shadow	2:36
3.	"Swan Lake"	Chief Xcel; DJ Shadow	5:39
4.	"Attica Black"	Chief Xcel	6:11
5.	"Cheezit Terrorist"	Chief Xcel	1:32
6.	"40oz for Breakfast"	DJ Shadow	7:42
7.	"Deep in the Jungle" (featuring Lateef and Asia Born)	Chief Xcel	6:50
Total length:			34:48

Digital reissue edition (2012) bonus track
No.	Title	Length
8.	"Change"	5:39
Total length:		40:34

Mo' Wax/Marlboro edition (1994)
No.	Title	Length
1.	"Swan Lake"	5:38
2.	"Lyric Fathom"	4:15
3.	"Attica Black"	6:12
4.	"40oz for Breakfast"	7:42
5.	"Rhymes for the Deaf, Dumb and Blind"	2:36
6.	"Deep in the Jungle" (featuring Lateef and Asia Born)	6:48
7.	"Swan Lake (Instrumental)"	5:07
8.	"Lyric Fathom (Instrumental)"	3:21
9.	"Attica Black (Instrumental)"	6:15
10.	"Deep in the Jungle (Instrumental)"	7:11
11.	"Rhymes for the Deaf, Dumb and Blind (Instrumental)"	2:31
Total length:		57:21
