= The Second Album (Latyrx album) =

Studio album by Latyrx
- Released: November 5, 2013
- Genre: Hip hop
- Length: 48:43
- Label: Latyramid
- Producer: Jel; Amp Live; Forrest Day; Tune-Yards; Antonionian; G-Koop & O-Man; Adam Theis; Lyrics Born; Chris Funk; Future People; Kaveh Rastegar; Jeremy Ruzumna; The Bangerz

Latyrx chronology
The Album (1997)	The Second Album (2013)

The Second Album is the second studio album by Latyrx, an American hip hop duo consisting of Lateef the Truthspeaker and Lyrics Born. It was released via Latyramid on November 5, 2013. It includes productions from Jel, Amp Live, and Tune-Yards, among others. The album peaked at number 34 on the Billboard Heatseekers Albums chart.

== Critical reception ==
Professional ratings
Aggregate scores
Source	Rating
Metacritic	63/100
Review scores
Source	Rating
AllMusic	3.5/5 stars
Consequence of Sound	C+
Pitchfork	4.8/10
Rolling Stone	3/5 stars

At Metacritic, which assigns a weighted average score out of 100 to reviews from mainstream critics, The Second Album received an average score of 63, based on 5 reviews, indicating "generally favorable reviews".

Mike Powell of Rolling Stone gave the album 3 stars out of 5, saying, "Their second album isn't as radically unusual as its well-regarded predecessor, but the template remains the same: eclectic without getting wacky, thoughtful without getting preachy, full of great wordplay over beats that tie hip-hop to a history of all-purpose head-nod music from funk to electro and beyond." Nate Patrin of Pitchfork gave the album a 4.8 out of 10, calling it "scattered and frantic."

== Track listing ==
No.	Title	Producer(s)	Length
1.	"Arrival"	Jel	3:59
2.	"It's Time" (featuring Zion I)	Amp Live	3:08
3.	"Reload"	Jel	3:23
4.	"Exclamation Point" (featuring Forrest Day)	Forrest Day	3:12
5.	"Deliberate Jibberish"	Tune-Yards	2:03
6.	"Close Your Eyes" (featuring Busdriver)	Antonionian	4:43
7.	"Nebula's Eye" (featuring 1-O.A.K. and Joyo Velarde)	G-Koop & O-Man	4:16
8.	"The Power of Rumor (Leonard Is Lost)"	Adam Theis; Lyrics Born	4:12
9.	"Watershed Moment" (featuring Gift of Gab)	Tune-Yards	3:10
10.	"Sometimes Why?"	Chris Funk	4:33
11.	"Every Man for Himself" (featuring Future People and Joyo Velarde)	Future People	4:52
12.	"Electric Chair" (featuring Corey Glover)	Kaveh Rastegar; Jeremy Ruzumna	4:01
13.	"Gorgeous Spirits"	The Bangerz	3:17
Total length:			48:43

== Charts ==
Chart	Peak position
US Heatseekers Albums (Billboard)	34
