= Rejoice! Rappers Are Rapping Again! =

EP by Gift of Gab
- Released: June 1, 2018
- Genre: Hip-Hop/Rap
- Length: 21 minutes
- Label: Giftstribution Unlimited

Rejoice! Rappers Are Rapping Again! is an EP by American rapper Gift of Gab. It was released on June 1, 2018, by Giftstribution Unlimited.

== Background ==
The first single "Freedom Form Flowing," which features R.A. the Rugged Man and A-F-R-O has gathered over 15 million views on YouTube, and is considered a huge underground success.

== Critical reception ==
Professional ratings
Review scores
Source	Rating
RapReviews.com	7.5/10
Surviving the Golden Age	7/10

Rejoice! Rappers Are Rapping Again! was met with favorable reviews.

Surviving the Golden Age says, "This EP didn't come off as an intro to an incredible album. It felt more like target practice but one thing is for certain. Timothy “Gift of Gab” Parker hasn't left the building. He's very much in attendance and still very much a lyrical threat."

RapReviews.com says, "The greedy will complain that it's only 8 tracks long, approximately 30 minutes in length, while the benevolent will be stunned he only charges $1 to join his Patreon campaign to get the EP. You can of course jump in at a higher level, and earn extra perks that go along with it (your name and/or face on the new album, exclusive merch for supporters, all of the usual s–t), but if you're cheap you get a half hour of music for less than a cup of coffee at Starbucks. Considering his challenges you might be surprised he's being so generous, especially given the cruel twist that an uncaring universe has handed him, but if you knew none of this and just listened to “Abominable” you'd simply be happy that Gab was back again with his trademark lyrical inventiveness."

== Track listing ==
All tracks are written by Timothy Parker.

No.	Title	Length
1.	"Bowling Pins"	2:46
2.	"Abominable"	3:01
3.	"Freedom Form Flowing (feat. R.A. the Rugged Man & A-F-R-O)"	4:33
4.	"Gabman"	4:09
5.	"The Gentrification Song"	2:59
6.	"Aspire"	3:39
Total length:		21 minutes
