= Lyrics Born =

Japanese-American rapper (born 1972)

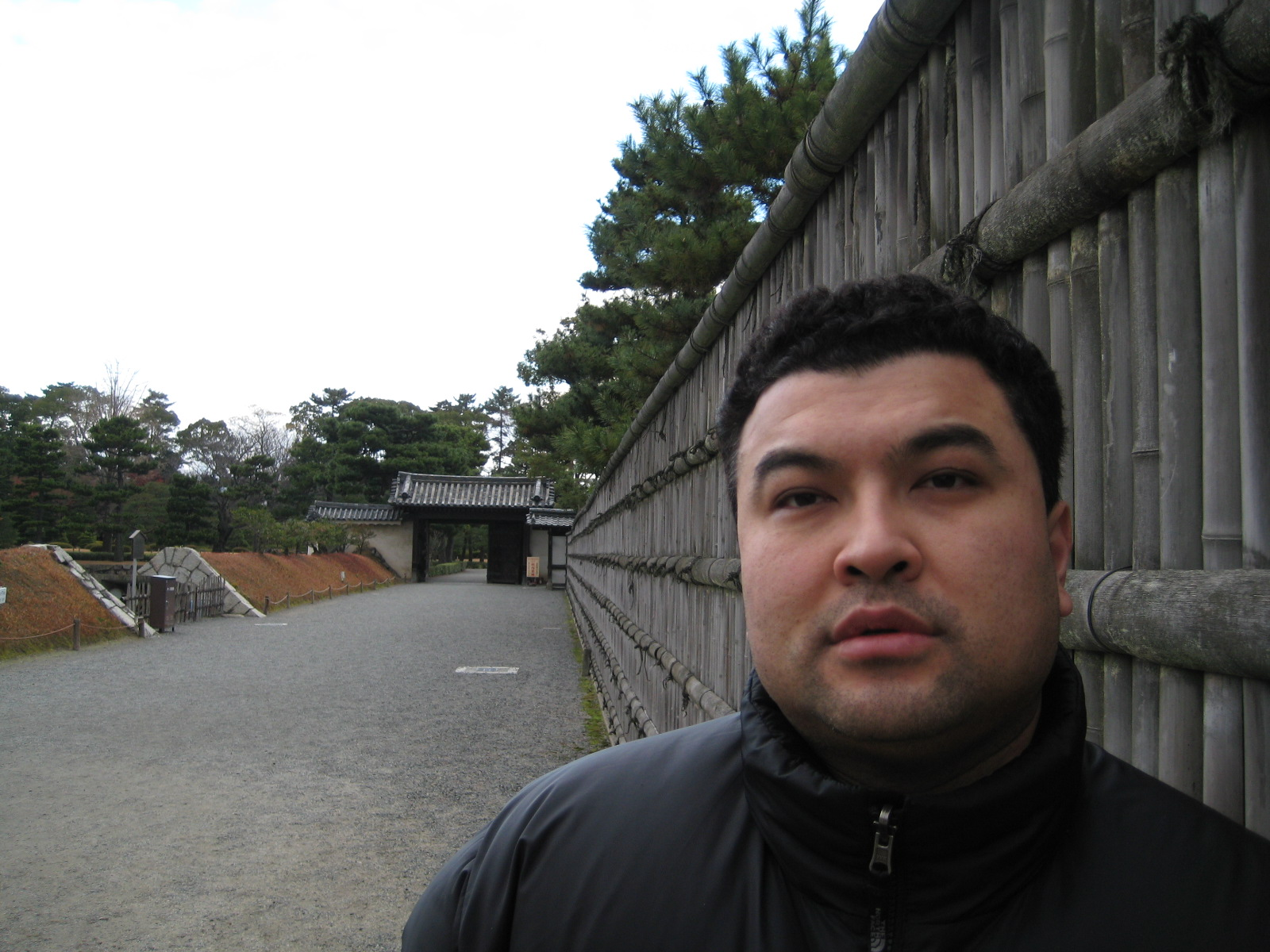
- Lyrics Born in Australia, 2008

Background information
- Also known as: Asia Born, Macka Dang Dang, LB
- Born: Tsutomu William Shimura; September 2, 1972 (age 54); Tokyo, Japan
- Origin: Berkeley, California, U.S.
- Genres: Alternative hip-hop, funk
- Occupations: Rapper, singer, producer
- Years active: 1993–present
- Labels: Quannum Projects, Epitaph, Decon
- Website: www.lyricsborn.com

Tsutomu William "Tom" Shimura (born September 2, 1972), better known by his stage name Lyrics Born (formerly Asia Born), is a Japanese-American rapper, singer, and producer. He is one half of the duo Latyrx with Lateef the Truthspeaker.

== Early life and education ==
Shimura was born in Tokyo to a Japanese father and an Italian mother. His family moved to the USA and he was raised in Salt Lake City, Utah and later Berkeley, California. He attended Henry B. Plant High School in Tampa, Florida.

== Career ==
Shimura changed his stage name from Asia Born to Lyrics Born in 1995, citing the desire to ensure that he won fans based on his merits as a rapper rather than his ethnicity. His first studio album, Later That Day, was released on Quannum Projects in 2003.

In an article published by Rolling Stone in 2022, Later That Day was listed as one of the "200 Greatest Hip-Hop Albums of All Time."

Lyrics Born's collaborations with Lateef the Truthspeaker on Latyrx records often see them trading lyrics back and forth in quick succession. Lyrics Born and Lateef's methodology for writing this type of lyric is described by Lateef in the book How to Rap: "With Latyrx stuff, when we have parts that we're writing that we're both going to be trading off, we write them together for the most part. I'll sit there and write a rhyme, like I'll write a line or two and then we'll break up who's gonna say what, and he'll write a line or two and we'll break up who's gonna say what. It's a very organic process."

In 2023, Lyrics Born's most popular song "Callin' Out" was mentioned as one of the "100 Greatest West Coast Hip-Hop Songs of All Time" by Rolling Stone.

== Discography ==
=== Studio albums ===
Lyrics Born

- Later That Day... (2003, Quannum Projects)
- Everywhere at Once (2008, Epitaph Records)
- As U Were (2010, Mobile Home Recordings/Decon Media)
- Real People (2015, Mobile Home Recordings)
- Quite a Life (2018, Mobile Home Recordings)
- Mobile Homies Season 1 (2022, Mobile Home Recordings)
- Vision Board (2022, Mobile Home Recordings)
- Goodbye, Sticky Rice (2024, Mobile Home Recordings)

Latyrx (Lyrics Born with Lateef the Truthspeaker)

- The Album (1997, Solesides)
- The Second Album (2013, Latyramid)

Quannum MCs (Lyrics Born with Chief Xcel, DJ Shadow, Gift of Gab & Lateef the Truth Speaker)

- Quannum Spectrum (Quannum Projects, 1999)

=== Other releases ===
Remix albums

- Same !@#$ Different Day (2005, Quannum Projects)
- As U Were (Remixes) (2012, Mobile Home Recordings/Decon Media)

Live albums

- Overnite Encore: Lyrics Born Live (2006, Quannum Projects)

A capella albums

- A Capella's Vol. 1 (2008)

EPs

- The Muzapper's Mixes (1998, Solesides) (Latyrx)
- Bad Dreams (2005, Jam Recordings)
- Disconnection EP (2012, Mobile Home Recordings/Latyramid) (Latyrx)
- Rapp Nite (2019, Mobile Home Recordings) (with Cutso)

Mixtapes

- Lyrics Born Variety Show Season One (2005, Mobile Home Recordings)
- Lyrics Born Variety Show Season Two (2006, Mobile Home Recordings)
- Lyrics Born Variety Show Season Three (2008, Mobile Home Recordings)
- Lyrics Born Variety Show Season Pho (2009, Mobile Home Recordings)
- Latyrical Madness, Vol. 1 (2011, Mobile Home Recordings/Latyramid) (Latyrx)
- Lyrics Born Variety Show Season Five: On the Floor (2012, Mobile Home Recordings/Decon Media)
- Lyrics Born Variety Show Season Six (2014, Mobile Home Recordings)
- Lyrics Born Variety Show Season Seven (2016, Mobile Home Recordings)

Compilation albums

- "Now Look What You've Done, Lyrics Born!" – Greatest Hits! (2016, Mobile Home Recordings)

Singles

- "Send Them" (1993, Solesides)
- "Latyrx" (1995, Solesides)
- "Burnt Pride" (1996, Solesides)
- "Balcony Beach" (1996, Solesides)
- "Lady Don't Tek No" (1998, Solesides) (Latyrx)
- "I Changed My Mind" (1999, Quannum Projects)
- "Hello" b/w "One Session" (2003, Mobile Home Recordings/Quannum Projects)
- "Callin' Out" (2003, Mobile Home Recordings/Quannum Projects)
- "Callin' Out Remix" b/w "Do That There Remix" (2004, Mobile Home Recordings/Quannum Projects)
- "I'm Just Raw" b/w "Pack Up Remix" (2005, Mobile Home Recordings/Quannum Projects)
- "Big Money Talk" (2006, Decon Recordings)
- "I Like It, I Love It" (2008, Mobile Home Recordings/Anti- Records)
- "Differences" (2008, Mobile Home Recordings/Anti- Records)
- "Top Shelf" (2008, Mobile Home Recordings/Anti-Records)
- "Hott 2 Deff" (2008, Mobile Home Recordings/Anti- Records)
- "Whispers" (2008, Mobile Home Recordings/Anti- Records)
- "Funky Hit Records" (2009, Mobile Home Recordings)
- "Pushed Aside, Pulled Apart" (2009, Mobile Home Recordings)
- "Oh Baby" (2009, Mobile Home Recordings)
- "Lies X 3" (2010, Mobile Home Recordings/Decon Recordings)
- "Diamond Door" (2022, Maximum Flavor Media, LLC)
- "Heaven and Armageddon" (2023, Mobile Home Recordings)

=== Additional credits ===
Guest appearances

- Blackalicious – "Deep in the Jungle" from Melodica (1994)
- Blackalicious – "Release" from Blazing Arrow (2002)
- Diverse – "Explosive" from One A.M. (2003)
- Tommy Guerrero – "Gettin' It Together" from Soul Food Taqueria (2003)
- Lifesavas – "Emerge" from Spirit in Stone (2003)
- Haiku D'Etat – "Top Qualified" from Coup de Theatre (2004)
- Blackalicious – "Give It to You" from The Craft (2005)
- DJ Z-Trip – "The Get Down" from Shifting Gears (2005)
- The Mighty Underdogs – "Ill Vacation" from Droppin' Science Fiction (2008)
- Joyo Velarde – "Strong Possibility" from Love & Understanding (2010)
- Lateef the Truthspeaker – "Hardship Enterprise" from Firewire (2011)
- Suburban Legends – "Can't Stop It" from Day Job (2012)
- Lotus – "Cannon in the Heavens" from Monks (2013)

Production credits

- Blackalicious – "Do This My Way" from Nia (1999)
- R. L. Burnside – "Goin' Down South" and "Someday Baby" from A Bothered Mind (2004)

Tracks appear on

- "I Changed My Mind" on Quannum Spectrum (1999)
- "Send Them" on Solesides Greatest Bumps (2000)
