= As U Were =

Studio album by Lyrics Born
- Released: October 26, 2010
- Genre: Hip hop
- Length: 55:37
- Label: Decon, Mobile Home Recordings
- Producer: Lyrics Born, Jake One

Lyrics Born chronology
Everywhere at Once (2008)	As U Were (2010)	Real People (2015)

As U Were is the third solo studio album by Lyrics Born. It was released on Decon and Mobile Home Recordings in 2010. It peaked at number 89 on the Billboard Top R&B/Hip-Hop Albums chart.

== Critical reception ==
Professional ratings
Aggregate scores
Source	Rating
Metacritic	63/100
Review scores
Source	Rating
AllMusic	3/5 stars
Christgau's Consumer Guide	(3-star Honorable Mention)
Pitchfork	6.8/10
PopMatters	6/10 stars
Rolling Stone	3/5 stars

At Metacritic, which assigns a weighted average score out of 100 to reviews from mainstream critics, the album received an average score of 63, based on 8 reviews, indicating "generally favorable reviews".

== Track listing ==
No.	Title	Producer(s)	Length
1.	"Kontrol Phreak"	Lyrics Born	3:32
2.	"I Wanna B W/U" (featuring Lateef)	Lyrics Born, Jake One	3:37
3.	"We Live by the Beat"	Lyrics Born	4:14
4.	"Coulda Woulda Shoulda" (featuring Sam Sparro)	Lyrics Born	4:40
5.	"As U Were Reception"	Lyrics Born	0:53
6.	"I've Lost Myself" (featuring Joyo Velarde)	Lyrics Born, Jake One	5:44
7.	"Lies X 3"	Lyrics Born	4:23
8.	"Born-E-Oh's!"	Lyrics Born	2:03
9.	"Pushed Aside/Pulled Apart" (featuring Lateef)	Lyrics Born, Jake One	4:11
10.	"Oh, Baby!"	Lyrics Born	3:28
11.	"I'm the Best (Funky Fresh in the Flesh)"	Lyrics Born	3:09
12.	"Block Bots" (featuring Clyde Carson and Trackademicks)	Lyrics Born	3:02
13.	"Pillz 'Lude"	Lyrics Born	0:55
14.	"Pillz" (featuring The Gift of Gab)	Lyrics Born	4:25
15.	"Something Better" (featuring Francis and the Lights)	Lyrics Born	3:46
16.	"Fake ID"	Lyrics Born	0:14
17.	"(What Happened 2 Our) Love Affair"	Lyrics Born	3:30

== Charts ==
Chart (2010)	Peak position
US Top R&B/Hip-Hop Albums (Billboard)	89
