= General Elektriks =

French musician

- Also known as: Hervé Salters, RV
- Origin: Paris, France
- Genres: Funk; pop; hip-hop; jazz; electronic
- Years active: 2003–present

General Elektriks is the musical project of French keyboard player, composer, singer, and producer Hervé Salters. He also uses the moniker RV, a contraction of the pronunciation of his first name in French.

== History ==
Hervé Salters, a French national and vintage keyboard player, was playing keys for various artists in Paris (Femi Kuti, Matthieu Chedid, Vercoquin, DJ Mehdi) before he moved to San Francisco in 1999. He started working on what would become General Elektriks as he was moving to the US. Once in California, he soon became associated with the Quannum Projects collective (Blackalicious, Lyrics Born, etc.) and started sessioning for them. He invited Quannum's own Lateef The Truthspeaker and Chief Xcel on a few tracks, then completed the 1st General Elektriks album, Cliquety Kliqk (2003). He released his debut album in 2003, Cliquety Kliqk, which was produced by Chief Xcel from Blackalicious and features an appearance from Lateef the Truth Speaker. Cliquety Kliqk was recorded on Salters's laptop in the period 2000-2003. Salters continued collaborating with Blackalicious, appearing on their album The Craft. He began working with Quannum group Honeycut, and released a sophomore full-length, Good City for Dreamers, in 2009. The full-length Parker Street arrived in 2011.

General Elektriks released the full-length To Be a Stranger and a live album, Punk Funk City, in 2016, and the full-length Carry No Ghosts in 2018. Also in 2018, he appeared at the Nice Jazz Festival.

== Discography ==
- Cliquety Kliqk (Quannum Projects, Bleu Electric; The Audio Kitchen, 2003)
- Good City for Dreamers (Quannum, 2009)
- Parker Street (Discograph, 2011)
- To Be a Stranger (The Audio Kitchen, 2016)
- Punk Funk City (Live) (The Audio Kitchen, 2016)
- Carry No Ghosts (Wagram Music, 2018)
- Party Like a Human (Wagram Music / 3ème Bureau, 2021)
