= Escape 2 Mars =

Studio album by Gift of Gab
- Released: November 3, 2009
- Genre: Hip-hop
- Length: 40:37
- Label: Cornerstone R.A.S.
- Producers: DNAE; Headnodic

Gift of Gab chronology
4th Dimensional Rocketships Going Up (2004)	Escape 2 Mars (2009)	The Next Logical Progression (2012)

Escape 2 Mars is the second solo studio album by American rapper Gift of Gab. It was released on November 3, 2009 via Cornerstone R.A.S.. Produced by DNAE Beats and Headnodic, it features guest appearances from Brother Ali and Del the Funky Homosapien.

== Critical reception ==
Professional ratings
Aggregate scores
Source	Rating
AnyDecentMusic?	6.2/10
Metacritic	76/100
Review scores
Source	Rating
AllMusic	4/5 stars
Clash	8/10
Paste	5.8/10
Pitchfork	5.4/10
PopMatters	5/10
RapReviews	9.5/10
Spectrum Culture	2.5/5
Spin	7/10 marks
The Independent	3/5 stars
The Skinny	2/5 stars

Escape 2 Mars was met with generally favorable reviews from music critics. At Metacritic, which assigns a normalized rating out of 100 to reviews from mainstream publications, the album received an average score of 76 based on eleven reviews. The aggregator AnyDecentMusic? has the critical consensus of the album at a 6.2 out of 10, based on nine reviews.

Mojo wrote, "This eco-themed, sci-fi clad concept album bristles with electro-pop sounds ('Light Years', the OMD-ish title track) yet retains Gab's furrowed-brow lyricism and singular approach as he forges his own space within this changing landscape."

Steve 'Flash' Juon of RapReviews.com named it the best album of 2009.

== Track listing ==
No.	Title	Producer(s)	Length
1.	"E2mtro"	Dnaebeats	2:15
2.	"El Gifto Magnifico"	Dnaebeats	3:25
3.	"Light Years"	Dnaebeats	5:09
4.	"Dreamin'" (featuring Del the Funky Homosapien and Brother Ali)	Headnodic	3:16
5.	"In Las Vegas"	Dnaebeats	3:28
6.	"Escape 2 Mars"	Dnaebeats	3:37
7.	"Electric Waterfalls"	Dnaebeats	4:07
8.	"Richman, Poorman"	Headnodic	4:23
9.	"Some of the People"	Headnodic	2:50
10.	"Spotlight"	Dnaebeats	4:37
11.	"Rhyme Travel"	Dnaebeats	3:51
Total length:			40:37
