= Pancho McFarland =

Louis "Pancho" McFarland is an American scholar who specializes in Chicano culture, particularly food and music.

McFarland was raised in Raton, New Mexico, and graduated from Colorado College in 1991. He is of Mexican descent, and visited Mexico while attending college. In 2002, he was assistant professor of sociology at University of Colorado Colorado Springs. Ca. 2006 he became a professor of sociology at Chicago State University. Since 2008 he is the executive director of the Green Lots Project, an organization active in the decolonial food movement.

== Publications ==
=== Monographs ===
- Chicano Rap: Gender and Violence in the Postindustrial Barrio (University of Texas Press, 2008) ResearchGate 288237304 doi:10.7560/718029
- The Chican@ Hip Hop Nation (Michigan State University, 2013) doi:10.14321/j.ctt7zt82f
- Toward a Chican@ Hip Hop Anticolonialism (Routledge, 2017)

=== Edited collections ===
- Mexican-Origin Food, Foodways and Social Movements (University of Arkansas Press, 2017) doi:10.2307/j.ctt1t89jww JSTOR j.ctt1t89jww
