= Later That Day =

Later That Day...

Studio album by Lyrics Born
- Released: October 7, 2003
- Genre: Hip hop
- Length: 59:26
- Label: Quannum Projects
- Producer: Lyrics Born, Cut Chemist, DJ D-Sharp

Lyrics Born chronology
Later That Day... (2003)	Same !@#$ Different Day (2005)

Singles from Later That Day...
- 1. "Hello" / "One Session" Released: 2002; 2. "Callin' Out" / "Cold Call" Released: 2003

Later That Day (stylized as Later That Day...) is the debut solo studio album by Lyrics Born. It was released on Quannum Projects in 2003. It peaked at number 40 on the Billboard Independent Albums chart.

== Critical reception ==
Professional ratings
Review scores
Source	Rating
AllMusic	3.5/5 stars
Christgau's Consumer Guide	A
Entertainment Weekly	B+
HipHopDX	7.5/10
IGN	9.0/10
Pitchfork	7.6/10
Resident Advisor	5/5
Rolling Stone	3.5/5 stars
Spin	A−

Spence D. of IGN gave the album a 9.0 out of 10, saying, "this is much more than a standard rap/hip-hop album, being more in tune with the bugged out aural manifestations of George Clinton and Frank Zappa than anything else." Barry Walters of Rolling Stone gave the album 3.5 stars out of 5, calling it "the rare hip-hop album that's as free and fun as it is tight."

In 2022, Rolling Stone listed Later That Day as one of the "200 Greatest Hip-Hop Albums of All Time."

== Track listing ==
No.	Title	Producer(s)	Length
1.	"Dream Sequence (Intro)"	Lyrics Born	1:30
2.	"Bad Dreams"	Lyrics Born	3:20
3.	"Rise and Shine"	Lyrics Born	5:22
4.	"Callin' Out"	Lyrics Born	3:34
5.	"U Ass Bank"	Lyrics Born	1:28
6.	"Cold Call" (featuring The Gift of Gab)	Lyrics Born	4:30
7.	"Interlude"	Lyrics Born	0:35
8.	"Stop Complaining" (featuring Tommy Guerrero)	Lyrics Born	3:25
9.	"Do That There" (featuring Cut Chemist)	Cut Chemist	3:38
10.	"Before and After"	Lyrics Born	4:36
11.	"The Last Trumpet" (featuring Lateef the Truthspeaker)	Lyrics Born	4:54
12.	"Pack Up"	DJ D-Sharp	4:05
13.	"Hott Bizness"	Lyrics Born	3:25
14.	"Love Me So Bad" (featuring Joyo Velarde)	Lyrics Born	4:31
15.	"One Session" (featuring The Altered Egos)	Lyrics Born	4:35
16.	"Nightro"	Lyrics Born	1:37
17.	"Hello"	Lyrics Born	3:55

== Charts ==
Chart (2003)	Peak position
US Independent Albums (Billboard)	40
