= The Mighty Underdogs =

American hip hop group

- Origin: San Francisco Bay Area, California, U.S.
- Genres: Hip hop
- Years active: 2007–2011
- Label: Definitive Jux
- Members: Gift of Gab; Lateef the Truthspeaker; Headnodic

The Mighty Underdogs was an American hip hop supergroup from the San Francisco Bay Area. It consists of rappers Gift of Gab and Lateef the Truthspeaker and producer Headnodic.

== History ==
The Mighty Underdogs was formed when Lateef the Truthspeaker, planning to make his own solo album, listened to some Headnodic-produced tracks, rapped a verse for each, and sent them over to Gift of Gab.

The group self-released The Prelude EP in Fall 2007. In 2010, XXL included it on the "100 Essential Rap EPs" list.

Their full-length studio album, Droppin' Science Fiction, was released on Definitive Jux in October 2008. It featured contributions from Chali 2na, DJ Shadow, Lyrics Born, and MF Doom, as well as Mr. Lif, Akrobatik, Tash, Julian Marley, and Damian Marley.

== Discography ==
Albums

- Droppin' Science Fiction (Definitive Jux, 2008)

EPs

- The Prelude EP (MU Records, 2007)

Singles

- "Want You Back" (2008)
- "Science Fiction" (2009)

Guest appearances

- Lyrics Born - "Ill Vacation" on The Lyrics Born Variety Show: Season Pho (4!) (2009)
- Zumbi - "Warwalk" on The Science of Breath, Vol. 4 (2009)
- Headnodic - "Academy of Rhyme" on "Movin' On Up" (2011)
- Headnodic - "Noddy by Nature" on Red Line Radio (2011)
- Raashan Ahmad - "Bring Me Back" on Collaborations (2015)
- Gift of Gab - "So Sad", "Ill Vacation" & "Victorious" on Greatest Misses Vol. I (2018)
