= Lateef the Truthspeaker =

American rapper

- Also known as: Lateef the Truthspeaker, Lateef, Lateef the Truth Speaker, Feetal
- Born: Lateef Kenneth Daumont; September 28, 1975 (age 50); Oakland, California
- Genres: Hip hop
- Occupation: Rapper
- Instrument: Vocals
- Years active: 1994–present
- Labels: Quannum Projects, Solesides
- Website: lateefthetruthspeaker.com

Lateef Kenneth Daumont, better known by his stage name Lateef the Truthspeaker, or mononymously as Lateef, is an American hip hop artist. He is a member of several hip hop groups such as Latyrx, Lateef and the Chief, and The Mighty Underdogs. He was a member of the SoleSides collective, and is a founding member of SoleSides' successor crew Quannum Projects.

== Life and career ==
Lateef was raised in East Oakland, where his father was security detail for the Black Panthers. His mother, a Panther medic, was a roommate and political associate of Angela Davis. He is of African American and Puerto Rican descent.

He has released several mixtapes such as Ahead of the Curve (2007), Truth Is Love (2009), and Truth at Sea (2011).

His solo debut album, Firewire, was released in 2011. It features contributions from Chief Xcel, Del the Funky Homosapien, the Grouch, Lyrics Born, Dan the Automator and DJ Shadow. He was also featured on the songs "Wonderful Night", "Champion Sound" and "That Old Pair of Jeans" by Fatboy Slim.

== Discography ==
=== Albums ===
Solo albums

- Firewire (2011)

Latyrx (Lateef with Lyrics Born)

- The Album (1997)
- The Muzappers Mixes (1998)
- The Second Album (2013)

Other collaboration albums

- Spectrum (1999) (with Chief Xcel, DJ Shadow, Gift of Gab and Lyrics Born, as Quannum)
- Ambush (2004) (with Chief Xcel, as Maroons)
- Droppin' Science Fiction (2008) (with Gift of Gab & Headnodic, as The Mighty Underdogs)
- All of This (2020) (with Jah Yzer and Winstrong, as Roots and Tings)
- The Strangers (2023) (with Leeroy and Hervé Salters, as The Strangers)

=== Mixtapes, EPs and compilations ===
- Latyrx (1997) (EP by Latyrx)
- Muzappers Mixes EP (1997) (EP by Latyrx)
- SoleSides: Greatest Bumps (2000) (compilation by Quannum)
- Ahead of the Curve (2007) (mixtape with Z-Trip)
- The Prelude EP (2007) (EP by The Mighty Underdogs)
- Truth Is Love (2009) (mixtape with DJ D-Sharp)
- Truth at Sea (2011) (mixtape with Somehow at Sea and DJ D-Sharp)
- Latyrical Madness Vol. 1 (2011) (mixtape by Latyrx)
- Disconnection (2012) (EP by Latyrx)
- Election Time (2020) (EP by Roots and Tings)

=== Singles ===
- "The Wreckoning" (1996) (Latyrx)

=== Guest appearances ===
- Blackalicious - "Deep in the Jungle" from Melodica (1994)
- Blackalicious - "Back to the Essence" from A2G (1999)
- Blackalicious - "If I May" and "Smithzonian Institute of Rhyme" from Nia (1999)
- Blackalicious - "4000 Miles" and "It's Going Down" from Blazing Arrow (2002)
- DJ Shadow - "Mashin' on the Motorway" from The Private Press (2002)
- Lyrics Born - "The Last Trumpet" from Later That Day (2003)
- Lifesavas - "Emerge" from Spirit in Stone (2003)
- General Elektriks - "Take You Out Tonight" from Cliquety Kliqk (2003)
- Fatboy Slim - "Wonderful Night" and "The Journey" from Palookaville (2004)
- Haiku D'Etat - "Top Qualified" from Coup de Theatre (2004)
- Freeform Five - "Losing My Control" from Strangest Things (2005)
- Lyrics Born - "The Last Trumpet (Halou Remix)" from Same !@#$ Different Day (2005)
- Blackalicious - "Side to Side" from The Craft (2005)
- DJ Shadow - "Enuff" from The Outsider (2006)
- Fatboy Slim - "That Old Pair of Jeans" and "Champion Sound" from The Greatest Hits – Why Try Harder (2006)
- DJ D-Sharp - Truth Spoken Mixtape: Volume 1 (2007)
- Kidkanevil - "5th Gear" from Problems & Solutions (2007)
- Z-Trip - "On My Side" from All Pro Soundtrack (2007)
- Stateless - "This Language" from Stateless (2007)
- Galactic - "No Way" from From the Corner to the Block (2007)
- Curumin - "Kyoto" from JapanPopShow (2008)
- The BPA - "So Fukt" from I Think We're Gonna Need a Bigger Boat (2009)
- Killa Kela - "Situation" from Amplified! (2009)
- Blundetto - "My One Girl" from Bad Bad Things (2010)
- Lyrics Born - "Pushed Aside, Pulled Apart" from As U Were (2010)
- Smokey Joe & the Kid - "Strange Days" from Nasty Tricks (2013)
- Blackalicious - "Alpha and Omega" from Imani Vol. 1 (2015)
