= Joyo Velarde =

Filipino hip hop and soul singer

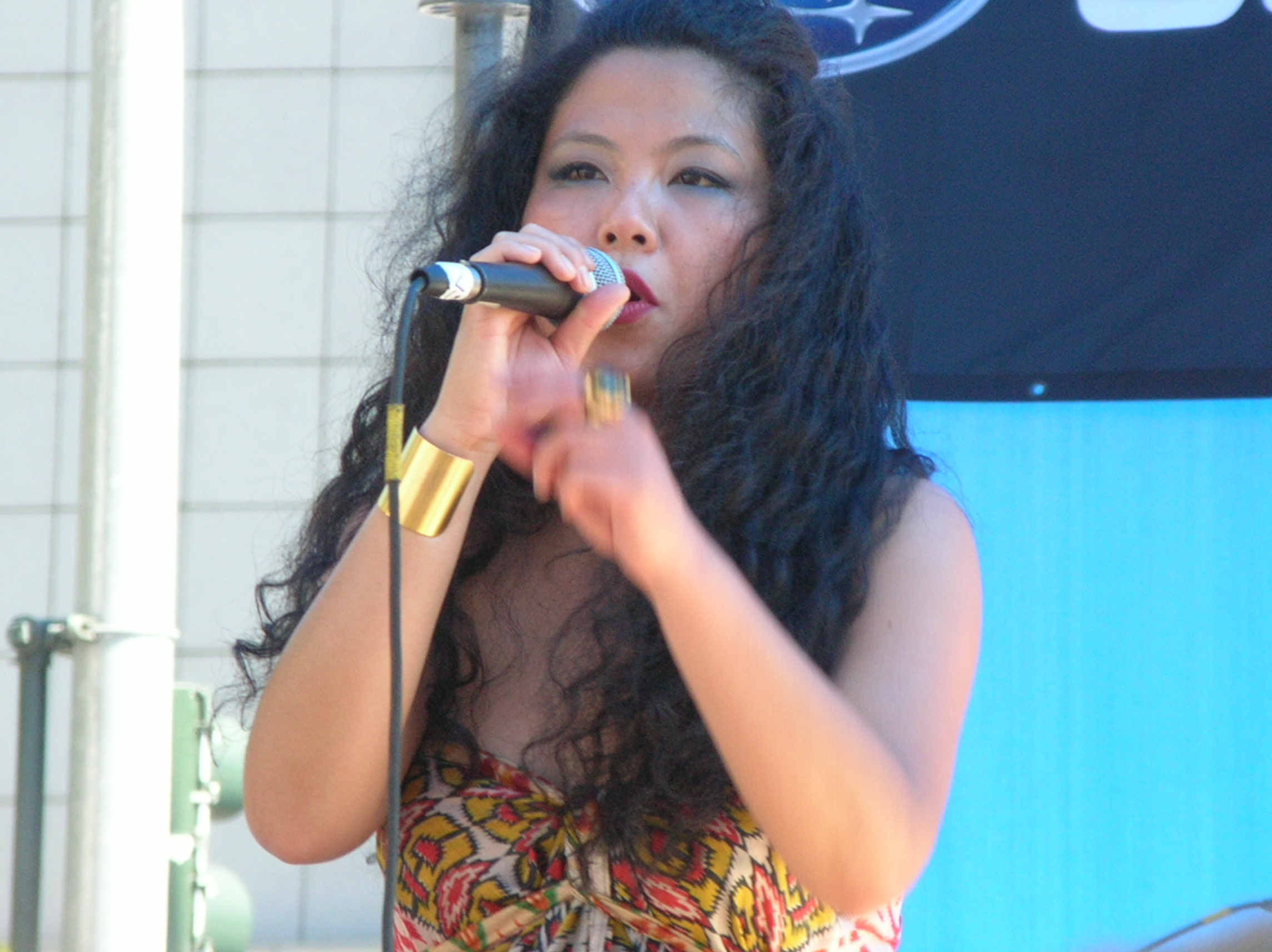
- Joyo Velarde performing live in May 2009.

Background information
- Born: Joyo Velarde; 1974 (age 51–52)
- Origin: El Cerrito, California, United States
- Genres: Hip-hop, pop, soul, funk
- Occupation: Singer
- Instrument: Vocals
- Years active: 1997 – present
- Label: Quannum Projects
- Website: www.joyovelarde.com

Joyo Velarde is a Filipino hip-hop and soul singer. Her husband is Lyrics Born. She has been featured on numerous tracks by the Quannum Projects cohorts.

== Career ==
Joyo Velarde's self-titled EP, Joyo Velarde, was released in May 2009.

She released the first studio album, Love and Understanding, in February 2010. It was produced by Lyrics Born, Jake One, and Headnodic, among others.

== Style and influences ==
Joyo Velarde stated that Chaka Khan and Minnie Riperton influenced her music.

== Discography ==
=== Studio albums ===
- Love and Understanding (2010)

=== Mixtapes ===
- Hey Love (2008)

=== EPs ===
- Joyo Velarde (2009)

=== Singles ===
- "Sweet Angels" (2001)

=== Guest appearances ===
- Latyrx - "Balcony Beach" from Latyrx (1997)
- Lyrics Born - "Love Me So Bad" from Later That Day (2003)
- Lyrics Born - "Over You" and "I Can't Wait for Your Love" from Same !@$ Different Day (2005)
- Lyrics Born - "I've Lost Myself" from As U Were (2010)
- Latyrx - "Nebula's Eye" from The Second Album (2013)
