= Lifesavas =

American hip-hop group

- Origin: Portland, Oregon, United States
- Genre: Hip-hop
- Label: Quannum Projects/Misfit Records
- Members: Vursatyl (MC), Jumbo (Producer, MC, DJ), Rev Shines (DJ)
- Website: Facebook.com/Lifesavas

Lifesavas is a hip-hop group from Portland, Oregon. Their style exhibits tag-team rhymes, matter-of-fact storytelling and a soulful production. The emcee's styles and song writing skills are showcased in the arrangements of a funky collection of subject matter and concepts.

== Formation ==
Vursatyl and Jumbo met playing basketball and ripping free-style in Portland city parks. Initially working on different projects out of the same makeshift studio, the two decided to join creative forces. DJ Rev Shines joined them, creating a trio.

Chief Xcel from Blackalicious discovered the Lifesavas and invited the group to perform in San Francisco with Blackalicious Quannum Projects.

Vursatyl was invited to perform backup vocals for Blackalicious during their live performances. Soon after, Jumbo and Shines joined Vursatyl on tour, opening for Quannum artists Blackalicious and Latyrx. That led to a record deal on Quannum Projects in 2003, where they released their debut album Spirit In Stone. The first single was "What If It's True?"

Their second album, Gutterfly, was released on April 10, 2005, on Quannum Projects, featuring the singles "Gutterfly" and "A Seperent's Love".

== Critical reception ==
Reviewing Spirit in Stone, The New York Times wrote that Lifesavas "switch off between conspiracy-minded politics and mocking critiques of commercial hip-hop ... They keep a sense of humor amid their righteousness." Robert Christgau gave the album an "A−", writing that the trio "leads with a sound, less catholic than that of their teachers De La Soul but still plenty absorptive—jazzlike, with a fluid Jamaican under-current." Mother Jones opined that the group "recalls A Tribe Called Quest at their nimble best ... This exciting trio combines crisp, punchy beats with brisk verbal flurries, generating densely textured sounds worthy of repeated hearings."

== Works ==
=== Albums ===
- Spirit in Stone (2003)
- Gutterfly (2007)

=== Track appearances ===
- "Hello_Hi_Hey" on Molson Red Leaf Collection Vol. 1 (2004)
- "Government Cheese" on "We came from Beyond, VOL. 2" (2003)
