= Blackalicious =

American hip hop duo

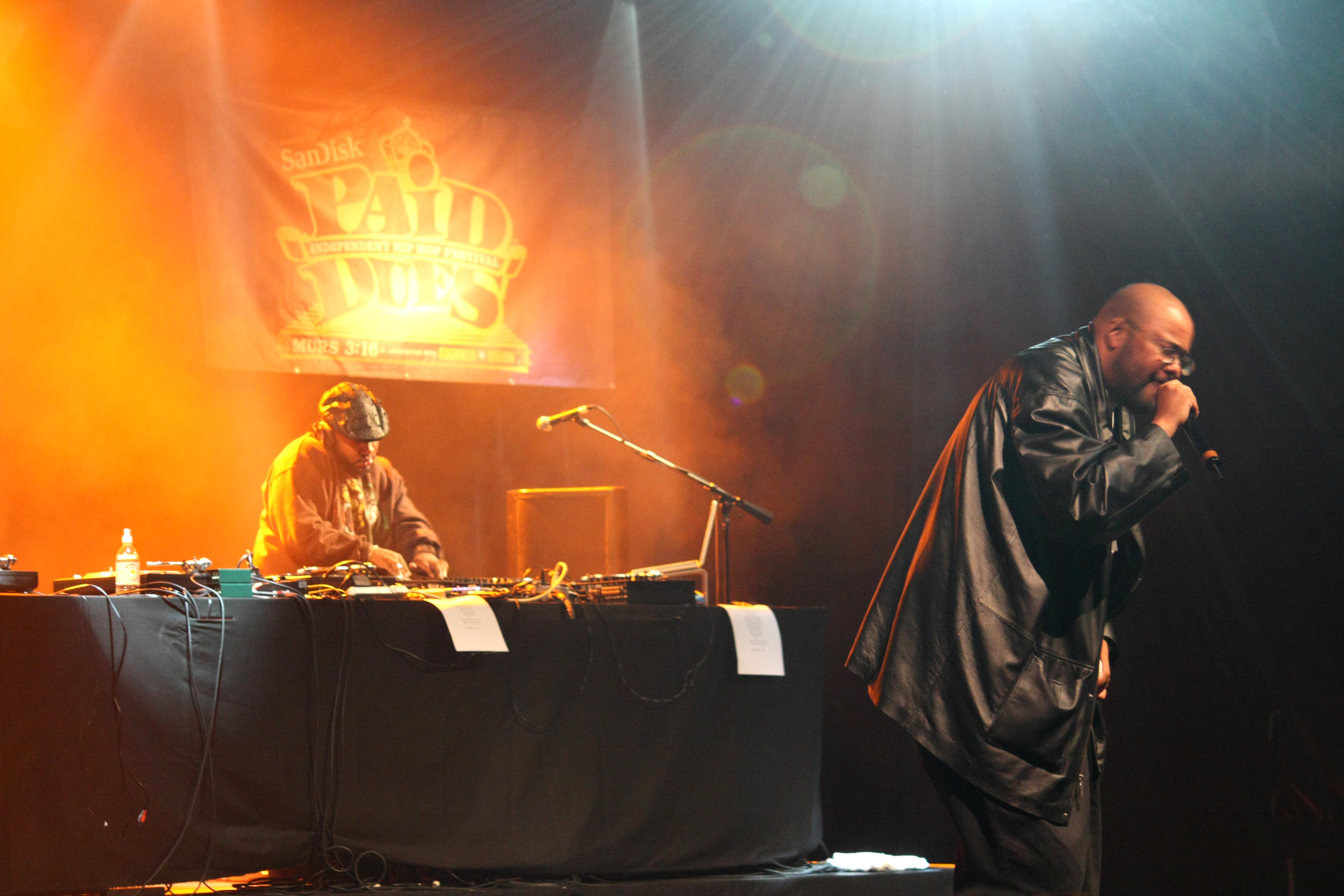
- Blackalicious duo Chief Xcel (left) and Gift of Gab performing at the Paid Dues hip hop festival in 2008

Background information
- Origin: Sacramento, California, U.S.
- Genres: Alternative hip-hop, West Coast hip-hop, indie hip-hop
- Years active: 1994–2021
- Labels: Quannum Projects, MCA/Universal Records, Solesides, Anti-
- Past members: Chief Xcel; Gift of Gab (deceased)
- Website: blackalicious.com

Blackalicious was an American hip-hop duo from Sacramento, California, made up of rapper Gift of Gab and DJ/producer Chief Xcel. They are noted for Gift of Gab's often tongue-twisting, multisyllabic, complex rhymes and Chief Xcel's soulful production. The duo released four full-length albums: Nia in 1999, Blazing Arrow in 2002, The Craft in 2005, and Imani Vol. 1 in 2015. Gift of Gab died in June 2021.

== Career ==
=== 1992–1999: Early years, Quannum Projects, Nia album ===
While Tim Parker (Gift of Gab) and Xavier Mosley (Chief Xcel) spent their early childhood years in Los Angeles and the San Francisco Bay Area respectively, the two first met while attending John F. Kennedy High School in Sacramento, California. At the time, Gift of Gab was known as Gabby T, while Chief Xcel went by the stage name of DJ IceSki. After graduating from Kennedy High in 1989, the two went their separate ways.

In 1992, during a time when Xcel was attending the University of California, Davis, Gift of Gab joined him in Davis, California to form Blackalicious. At UC Davis, Xcel had been working with a hip-hop group named SoleSides, whose members included DJ Shadow, Lateef the Truthspeaker, and Lyrics Born. Solesides Records was the name of the collective's Northern California record company, and in 1994 the label released Blackalicious' debut single "Swan Lake", which garnered acclaim within the independent music scene. In 1995, Blackalicious released an EP titled Melodica under Solesides Records. By 1997, Solesides Records had transformed into the now acclaimed Quannum Projects, and under this label, the group released a 1999 EP titled A2G, featuring the hyper-accelerated song "Alphabet Aerobics". Later that year, the group released its debut full-length debut album Nia. The album was released in Europe by Mo' Wax on August 30, 1999, and later re-released in the United States by Quannum Projects on February 29, 2000, with a slightly altered track list.

=== 2000–2004: MCA Records, Blazing Arrow album ===
In 2000, the group signed a major label deal with MCA Records. In 2002, MCA/Universal released Blazing Arrow, which boasted guest appearances including Zack de la Rocha (of Rage Against the Machine), Questlove (of The Roots), and legendary soul and jazz musician Gil Scott-Heron. Blazing Arrow contains the song "Make You Feel That Way", which became a fixture on radio stations. Following a promotional tour, both Xcel and Gab began working on separate projects. In 2004, Gift of Gab released his first solo album, 4th Dimensional Rocketships Going Up.

=== 2005–2013: The Craft album, additional solo projects ===
The pair returned in 2005 for their third album The Craft, released under Anti- and Quannum Projects. For this album, the group worked with Grammy Award-winning engineer Russell Elevado. The album contained more live instrumentation compared to previous Blackalicious albums, and was met with positive acclaim. Following the release of The Craft, Gift of Gab joined a supergroup called The Mighty Underdogs, which released an album Droppin' Science Fiction in 2008. Gift of Gab then went on to release two additional solo albums, Escape 2 Mars in 2009 and The Next Logical Progression in 2012.

=== 2014–present: "Alphabet Aerobics" in pop culture, Imani album, Gift of Gab's death, and future releases ===
On October 28, 2014, actor Daniel Radcliffe recited the full lyrics to the Blackalicious song "Alphabet Aerobics" on The Tonight Show Starring Jimmy Fallon. Since then, the lyrics to "Alphabet Aerobics" have been recited throughout media outlets in various contexts. Blackalicious also reworked the song with sports-themed lyrics for Bleacher Report.

In 2015, after ten years since releasing a project together, Gift of Gab and Chief Xcel announced the fourth Blackalicious album Imani Vol. 1. The group partnered up with PledgeMusic to give dedicated fans the opportunity to purchase the album and other special items, with over 120% of the project's goal funds being met. Imani Vol. 1 was released on September 18, 2015, and was well received by critics. In January 2015, Gift of Gab stated that Imani Vol. 1 would be the first in a three-volume series to be released over a two-year period. In February 2019, Gift of Gab stated that the group had over 70 recordings in progress and was in the process of selecting and polishing 14 tracks for Imani Volume 2. In October 2019, the duo was reportedly putting the "finishing touches" on the album.

Gift of Gab suffered from kidney failure, and spent a period of several years regularly undergoing dialysis. He received a kidney transplant in January 2020. He died on June 18, 2021, of natural causes at the age of 50.

In April 2022, Lateef the Truthspeaker confirmed that there is a final Blackalicious album still to be released (possibly no longer to be titled Imani Vol. 2), and that he was working with Chief Xcel to complete it. In October 2023, he reaffirmed that this work was ongoing.

== Discography ==
Studio albums

Title	Album details	Peak chart positions					Sales
Title	Album details	US	US R&B /HH	US Rap	US Indie	AUS	Sales
Nia	Released: August 30, 1999; Label: Quannum Projects	—	—	—	—	—	
Blazing Arrow	Released: April 30, 2002; Label: MCA/Universal Records	49	33	—	—	84	
The Craft	Released: September 27, 2005; Label: Anti-/Epitaph Records	102	79	—	5	—	US: 67,000
Imani Vol. 1	Released: September 18, 2015; Label: OGM Recordings	—	28	21	39	—	
"—" denotes releases that did not chart.

EPs

- Melodica (Mo Wax, 1994)
- A2G (Quannum Projects, 1999)
- Deception Remixes (Quannum Projects, 1999)

Singles

- "Swan Lake" / "Lyric Fathom" 12" (Solesides, 1994)
- "Deception" 12" (Quannum Projects, 1999)
- "If I May" / "Reanimation" 12" (Mo' Wax/Quannum Projects, 2000)
- "Paragraph President" / "Passion" 12" (MCA/Universal, 2001)
- "Make You Feel That Way" / "Sky Is Falling" 12" (MCA/Universal, 2002)
- "Your Move" / "My Pen And Pad" 12" (Quannum Projects/ANTI-/Epitaph, 2005)
- "Powers" (Quannum Projects/Anti-/Epitaph, 2006)

DVDs

- 4/20: Live In Seattle (2006)
