= SoleSides =

American hip hop group

SoleSides was an American underground hip hop label based in Northern California, founded in 1991. It comprised various DJs and MCs, the most notable being DJ Shadow, MC–producer Lyrics Born and duo Blackalicious. The members of Solesides all met via KDVS, the 5000-watt community radio station of the University of California, Davis. During high school, Davis-natives DJ Shadow and The 8th Wonder used to frequent the station to support Orus Washington's hip hop show. In college, journalist and then-grad student Jeff "DJ Zen" Chang, broadcast a weekly hip hop radio show that got the attention of DJ Shadow and The 8th Wonder, freshmen Xavier Mosely (Chief Xcel), Tom Shimura (Lyrics Born) and Joseph Patel (Jazzbo). They all shared a like-minded passion for hip hop that pushed beyond the sounds of mainstream commercial music.

In 1991, the six came together to form a collective of artists and hip hop lovers, naming the label SoleSides. The first release, was a 12" single, numbered "SS001", featuring DJ Shadow's instrumental odyssey, "Entropy" on one side and Lyrics Born (then known as Asia Born) on the other side with the song "Send Them". The white-label 12" was preceded by a cassette single version of the release and both have fetched high dollars in the re-sale market. Only 400 cassettes and 200 12" vinyl singles were originally pressed up and sold on consignment in record stores in the Bay Area.

In 1996 the label won a "Goldie" award from the San Francisco Bay Guardian, being described as "Both a progressive crew of deejays and rappers and a fiercely independent artist-owned label...".

SoleSides disbanded in the winter of 1996, and was reborn as Quannum Projects in spring of 1997.

== Members ==
- The 8th Wonder (Stan Green)
- Asia Born (Tom Shimura)
- Chief Xcel (Xavier Mosley)
- DJ Shadow (Josh Davis)
- DJ Zen (Jeff Chang)
- Gift of Gab (Tim Parker)
- Jazzbo (Joseph Patel)
- Kali
- Lateef the Truthspeaker (Lateef Daumont)
- Mack B. Dog (Benjamin Davis)
