= Latyrx =

American hip-hop group

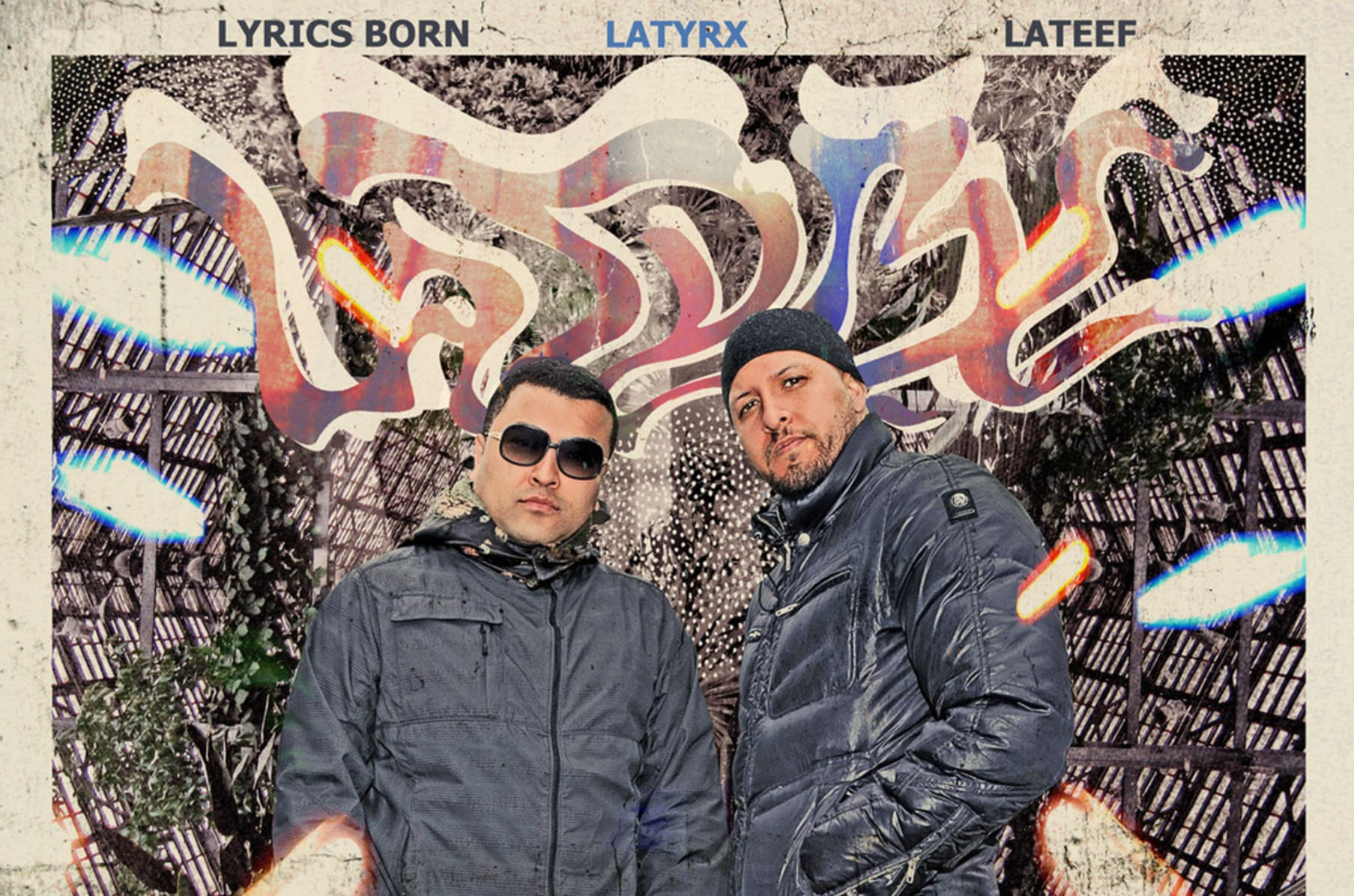

Background information
- Origin: Davis, California, United States
- Genre: Alternative hip-hop
- Years active: 1996–present
- Label: Solesides
- Members: Lateef the Truthspeaker; Lyrics Born

Latyrx (/læˈtɪrɪks/ la-TI-riks) is an American alternative hip-hop duo consisting of Lateef the Truthspeaker and Lyrics Born. The duo originates from the Solesides collective at the University of California, Davis.

== History ==
Lateef the Truthspeaker and Lyrics Born were both members of the Solesides collective, a group affiliated with Jeff Chang's radio show (then known as DJ Zen) on KDVS, the student radio station at the University of California, Davis. Initially, both recorded as solo artists, with Lyrics Born originally using the moniker "Asia Born". In early 1993, Lyrics Born released the first single on the Solesides label titled "Send Them".

DJ Shadow, another Solesides member, contributed production to four tracks on Latyrx’s debut album. The first release under the name "Latyrx" came in 1996 as the B-side to Lateef’s solo single "The Wreckoning". The track, also titled "Latyrx", used a vocal layering method in which both MCs rapped different verses simultaneously.

In 1996, additional solo releases followed, including Lateef’s "The Quickening (The Wreckoning Pt. II)", produced by DJ Shadow, and Lyrics Born's "Balcony Beach", backed with "Burnt Pride". Much of their solo work, along with new material, was compiled into their debut album, The Album, released in 1997.

The follow-up EP, Muzappers Mixes, was released in 1997 and included the single "Lady Don’t Tek No".

During this period, Solesides Records restructured into a new label, Quannum Projects, with the collective adopting "Quannum" as its official name. Latyrx subsequently appeared on "8 Point Agenda", a 1999 single by The Herbaliser, and contributed material to the Quannum Spectrum compilation that same year.

== Discography ==
Albums

- The Album (1997)
- The Second Album (2013)

EPs

- The Muzapper's Mixes EP (1997)
- Disconnection (2012)

Remix albums

- The Muzapper's Mixes (1997)

Compilations

- Latyrical Madness Volume 1 (2012)

Live albums

- Latyrx: Live at Google (2012)

Singles

- "Lady Don't Tek No" (1997)
