= Quannum =

American hip-hop collective

- Founded: 1992
- Founder: DJ Shadow; Chief Xcel; Gift of Gab; Lyrics Born; Lateef
- Genre: Hip-hop
- Country of origin: U.S.
- Location: San Francisco, California

Quannum (also known as Quannum MCs or Quannum Mechanics) is an American hip-hop collective based in the San Francisco Bay Area. It has been active since 1992, when it was formed at UC Davis under the moniker Solesides Records. It is also the name of the independent record label, Quannum Projects, that releases their records, as well as those of a number of other artists. The label continues to be 100% independently owned and operated.

== Artist roster ==
- Apsci (Dana Diaz-Tutaan & Raphael LaMotta – Brooklyn, New York)
- Blackalicious (Gift of Gab & Chief Xcel – Sacramento, California)
- Curumin (Luciano Nakata Albuquerque – Brazil)
- General Elektriks (Hervé Salters – Paris, France)
- Tommy Guerrero (San Francisco, California)
- Honeycut (San Francisco, California)
- Lateef and the Chief a.k.a. Maroons (Lateef & Chief Xcel – Oakland, California)
- Latyrx (Lateef & Lyrics Born – Oakland, California)
- Lifesavas (Jumbo, Vursatyl, Rev. Shines – Portland, Oregon)
- Lyrics Born (Berkeley, California)
- Pieces of Peace (Chicago, Illinois)
- Pigeon John (Hawthorne, California)
- Poets of Rhythm (Whitefield Brothers & Boris Borale – Munich, Germany)
- DJ Shadow (Joshua Davis – Mill Valley, California)
- Joyo Velarde (Berkeley, California)

== See also ==
- List of record labels
- Underground hip-hop
