= DJ Shadow discography =

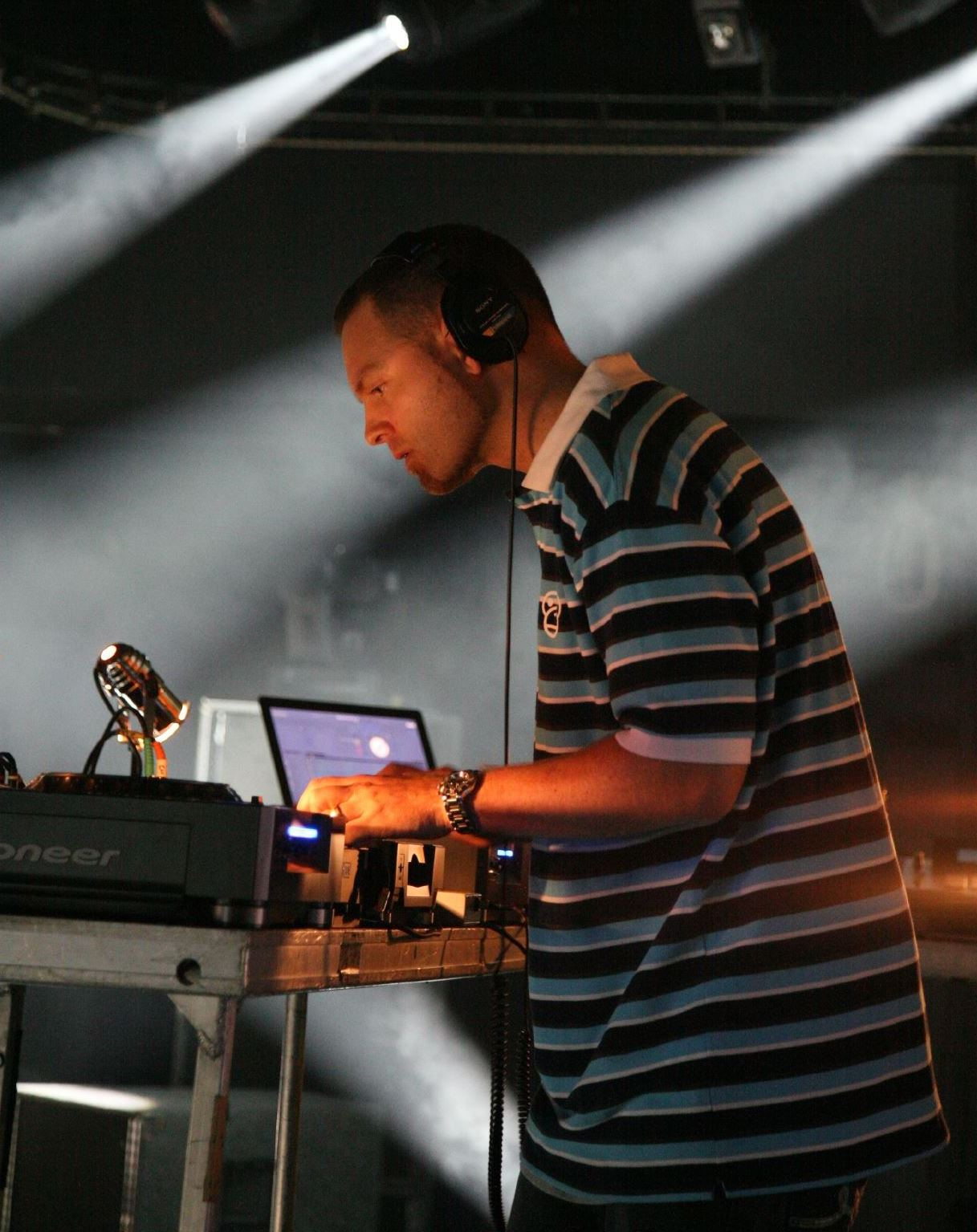
- Studio albums: 7
- Extended plays: 5
- Live albums: 7
- Compilation albums: 7
- Singles: 35
- Music videos: 27
- Remix albums: 3
- Mix albums: 2

The discography of DJ Shadow, an American music producer and disc jockey, consists of seven studio albums, seven live albums, seven compilation albums, three remix albums, two mix albums, five extended plays, thirty-five singles and twenty-seven music videos. He released his debut single – a split release featuring his track "Lesson 4" and "Real Deal" by American hip hop ensemble Lifers Group – in 1991. After signing to Mo' Wax Records in 1993, he released the singles "In/Flux" and "Lost and Found (S.F.L.)", both of which became minor hits in the United Kingdom. Shadow attained his first top 75 single in 1995 with "What Does Your Soul Look Like", which peaked at number 59 in the UK. In November 1996, his debut studio album Endtroducing..... was released to critical acclaim. It peaked at numbers 17 and 75 in the UK and the Netherlands respectively, later being certified gold by the British Phonographic Industry (BPI). The album's first single, "Midnight in a Perfect World", charted at number 54 in the UK. "Stem", the album's second single, became a top fifteen hit in Ireland. Remix singles of the Endtroducing..... tracks "What Does Your Soul Look Like (Part 1 – Blue Sky Revisit)" and "The Number Song" were also issued. The compilation album Preemptive Strike peaked at number 118 on the United States Billboard 200, becoming Shadow's first album to chart in the country. It produced one single, "High Noon", which peaked at number 22 in the UK.

Shadow's second studio album The Private Press was released in June 2002, peaking at number 44 on the Billboard 200. It also charted in several other countries, peaking at number eight in the UK and earning a gold certification from the BPI. The album's first two singles – "You Can't Go Home Again" and "Six Days" – became top ten hits on the Billboard Hot Singles Sales and Hot Dance Singles Sales charts. In 2005, Shadow collaborated with English alternative rock band Keane on the single "We Might as Well Be Strangers", which peaked at number 123 in the UK and number 27 on the Hot Singles Sales chart. He released his third studio album The Outsider in September 2006; it peaked at number 77 on the Billboard 200. The album produced four singles, including the UK top 60 hit "This Time (I'm Gonna Try It My Way)".

The Less You Know, the Better, Shadow's fourth studio album, was released in September 2011 and peaked at number 149 on the Billboard 200. It also became his third consecutive top five album on the Billboard Dance/Electronic Albums chart, where it peaked at number five. "Scale It Back", the album's third single, charted in the Belgian region of Flanders.

== Albums ==
=== Studio albums ===
List of studio albums, with selected chart positions, sales figures and certifications
Title	Album details	Peak chart positions										Sales	Certifications
Title	Album details	US	US Dance	AUS	BEL (FL)	FIN	FRA	JPN	NLD	NOR	UK	Sales	Certifications
Endtroducing.....	Released: 16 September 1996 (US); Label: Mo' Wax; Formats: CD, cassette, LP	—	—	—	—	—	—	—	75	—	17	US: 290,000	BPI: Platinum; MC: Gold
The Private Press	Released: June 4, 2002 (US); Label: Island, MCA; Formats: CD, cassette, LP	44	3	21	20	37	21	68	54	16	8	US: 160,000	BPI: Gold
The Outsider	Released: September 19, 2006 (US); Label: Island, Universal; Formats: CD, LP, digital download	77	2	44	68	—	105	67	—	—	24	US: 40,000	
The Less You Know, the Better	Released: October 4, 2011 (US); Label: Island, A&M, Verve; Formats: CD, LP, digital download	149	5	—	80	—	118	86	—	—	34		
The Mountain Will Fall	Released: June 24, 2016 (US); Label: Mass Appeal; Formats: CD, LP, digital download	77	1	31	21	—	106	—	81	—	19		
Our Pathetic Age	Released: November 15, 2019; Label: Mass Appeal; Formats: CD, LP, digital download, streaming	—	—	—	143	—	—	—	—	—	53		
Action Adventure	Released: October 27, 2023; Label: Mass Appeal; Formats: Digital download, streaming	—	—	—	—	—	—	—	—	—	—		
"—" denotes a recording that did not chart or was not released in that territory.

=== Live albums ===
List of live albums
Title	Album details
Brainfreeze (with Cut Chemist)	Released: 1999 (US); Label: Sixty7; Formats: CD
Product Placement (with Cut Chemist)	Released: November 1, 2001 (US); Label: One29; Formats: CD
Live! In Tune and On Time	Released: June 15, 2004 (US); Label: Island, Geffen; Formats: CD, LP
Live at Brixton Academy December 2006	Released: December 15, 2006 (US); Label: Island; Formats: CD, digital download
The Hard Sell (with Cut Chemist)	Released: 2007 (US); Label: Pillage Roadshow; Formats: CD, digital download
The Hard Sell (Encore) (with Cut Chemist)	Released: June 3, 2008 (US); Label: Pillage Roadshow; Formats: CD, digital download
Live in Manchester: The Mountain Has Fallen Tour	Released: July 13, 2018; Label: Mass Appeal; Formats: Digital download

=== Compilation albums ===
List of compilation albums, with selected chart positions
Title	Album details	Peak chart positions		Sales
Title	Album details	US	UK	Sales
Preemptive Strike	Released: January 13, 1998 (US); Label: Mo' Wax; Formats: CD, cassette, LP	118	161	US: 147,000
Excessive Ephemera	Released: 2005 (US); Label: Island Records; Formats: LP	—	—	
The 4-Track Era Volume 1: Best of the KMEL Mixes (1991)	Released: August 27, 2007 (US); Label: Reconstruction Productions; Formats: CD, digital download	—	—	
The 4-Track Era Volume 2: Best of the Remixes and Megamixes (1990–1992)	Released: December 11, 2007 (US); Label: Reconstruction Productions; Formats: CD, digital download	—	—	
The 4-Track Era Volume 3: Best of the Original Productions (1990–1992)	Released: November 11, 2008 (US); Label: Reconstruction Productions; Formats: CD, digital download	—	—	
Total Breakdown: Hidden Transmissions from the MPC Era 1992–1996	Released: June 5, 2012 (US); Label: Reconstruction Productions; Formats: CD, LP, digital download	—	—	
Reconstructed: The Best of DJ Shadow	Released: September 25, 2012 (US); Label: Island; Formats: CD, LP, digital download	—	124	
"—" denotes a recording that did not chart or was not released in that territory.

=== Remix albums ===
List of remix albums
Title	Album details
The Private Repress	Released: March 29, 2003 (JPN); Label: Island; Formats: CD, LP
The DJ Shadow Remix Project	Released: July 15, 2010 (US); Label: Reconstruction Productions; Formats: CD, LP, digital download
Endtroducing Re-Emagined	Released: October 28, 2016 (US); Label: Island Records; Formats: CD, LP, digital download

=== Mix albums ===
List of mix albums
Title	Album details
Diminishing Returns	Released: July 15, 2003 (US); Label: Reconstruction Productions; Formats: CD, LP
Funky Skunk (with Shepard Fairey)	Released: 2005 (US); Label: Reconstruction Productions; Formats: CD

== Extended plays ==
List of extended plays
Title	EP details
Bay Area EP	Released: June 19, 2007 (US); Label: Island; Formats: CD, 12"
I Gotta Rokk	Released: May 11, 2011 (UK); Label: Island; Formats: CD, 12", digital download
I'm Excited	Released: July 29, 2011 (UK); Label: Island; Formats: CD, 12", digital download
The Liquid Amber EP	Released: 2014; Label: Liquid Amber; Formats: Digital download
The Mountain Has Fallen	Released: July 7, 2017; Label: Mass Appeal; Formats: Digital download

== Singles ==
List of singles, with selected chart positions, showing year released and album name
Title	Year	Peak chart positions								Album
Title	Year	US Sales	US Dance Sales	US R&B Sales	BEL (FL)	CAN	IRL	MEX Air.	UK	Album
"Real Deal" (Shadow Remix) / "Lesson 4" (with Lifers Group)	1991	—	—	—	—	—	—	—	—	BASIC Beats Sampler
"Send Them" / "Entropy" (with Asia Born)	1993	—	—	—	—	—	—	—	—	Non-album singles
"In/Flux"	1993	—	—	—	—	—	—	—	110	Non-album singles
"Lost and Found (S.F.L.)" / "Kemuri" (with DJ Krush)	1994	—	—	—	—	—	—	—	88	Non-album singles
"What Does Your Soul Look Like"	1995	—	—	—	—	—	—	—	59	Non-album singles
"A Whim" / "89.9 Megamix" (with DJ Krush)	1995	—	—	—	—	—	—	—	—	Non-album singles
"Hardcore (Instrumental) Hip Hop" / "Fully Charged on Planet X" (with Chief Xcel)	1996	—	—	—	—	—	—	—	—	Non-album singles
"Midnight in a Perfect World"	1996	—	—	—	—	—	—	—	54	Endtroducing.....
"Stem"	1996	—	—	—	—	—	14	—	74	Endtroducing.....
"Camel Bobsled Race"	1997	—	—	—	—	—	—	—	62	Non-album single
"What Does Your Soul Look Like (Part 1 – Blue Sky Revisit)" (Remixes)	1997	—	—	—	—	—	—	—	54	Endtroducing.....
"High Noon"	1997	—	—	—	—	—	—	—	22	Preemptive Strike
"The Number Song" (Cut Chemist Party Mix) / "Painkiller" (Kill the Pain Mix) (with Depeche Mode)	1998	—	—	—	—	—	—	—	—	Endtroducing.....
"Dark Days"	2000	—	—	—	—	—	—	—	140	Dark Days (soundtrack)
"You Can't Go Home Again"	2002	9	2	—	—	25	—	—	30	The Private Press
"Six Days"	2002	10	1	38	—	—	—	—	28	The Private Press
"Mashin' on the Motorway"	2002	—	—	—	—	—	—	—	—	The Private Press
"We Might as Well Be Strangers" (with Keane)	2005	27	4	—	—	—	—	—	123	Hopes and Fears
"3 Freaks" (featuring Keak da Sneak and Turf Talk)	2005	—	—	—	—	—	—	—	—	The Outsider
"Enuff" (featuring Lateef the Truth Speaker and Q-Tip)	2006	—	—	—	—	—	—	—	—	The Outsider
"You Made It" (featuring Chris James)	2006	—	—	—	—	—	—	—	—	The Outsider
"This Time (I'm Gonna Try It My Way)"	2006	—	—	—	—	—	—	—	54	The Outsider
"Gabracabara" (featuring Gift of Gab)	2007	—	—	—	—	—	—	—	—	Non-album single
"Def Surrounds Us" / "I've Been Trying"	2010	—	—	—	—	—	—	—	—	The Less You Know, the Better
"I Gotta Rokk"	2011	—	—	—	—	—	—	—	—	The Less You Know, the Better
"Warning Call" (featuring Tom Vek)	2011	—	—	—	—	—	—	39	—	The Less You Know, the Better
"Scale It Back" (featuring Little Dragon)	2011	—	—	—	93	—	—	28	—	The Less You Know, the Better
"Listen" (featuring Terry Reid)	2012	—	—	—	—	—	—	—	—	Reconstructed: The Best of DJ Shadow
"Nobody Speak" (featuring Run the Jewels)	2016	—	—	—	—	—	—	—	—	The Mountain Will Fall
"Traumschiff" (featuring Romano)	2017	—	—	—	—	—	—	—	—	Non-album single
"Rocket Fuel" (featuring De La Soul)	2019	—	—	—	—	—	—	—	—	Our Pathetic Age
"Rosie"	2019	—	—	—	—	—	—	—	—	Our Pathetic Age
"Ozone Scraper"	2023	—	—	—	—	—	—	—	—	Action Adventure
"You Played Me"	2023	—	—	—	—	—	—	—	—	Action Adventure
"Nobody Speak Part 2" (featuring Run the Jewels, Denzel Curry, and TiaCorine)	2026	—	—	—	—	—	—	—	—	The Mountain Will Fall (10th Anniversary Edition)
"Nobody Wants To Die" (featuring Ice Cube)	2026	—	—	—	—	—	—	—	—	The Mountain Will Fall (10th Anniversary Edition)
"—" denotes a recording that did not chart or was not released in that territory.

== Other appearances ==
=== Production ===
Title	Year	Artist(s)	Album
"Swan Lake"; "40oz for Breakfast"; "Rhymes for the Deaf, Dumb and Blind"	1994	Blackalicious	Melodica (EP)
"Latyrx"; "The Quickening (The Wreckoning Part II)"; "Scratchapella"; "The Wreckoning (Live 45 Mix)"	1997	Latyrx	The Album
"Lady Don't Tek No"	1997	Latyrx	The Muzapper's Mixes EP
"Cliff Hanger"	1999	Blackalicious	Nia
"Holy Calamity (Bear Witness II)"	1999	Handsome Boy Modeling School	So... How's Your Girl?
"Storm Warning"; "Divine Intervention"; "Hott People"; "Bombonyall"	1999	Various	Quannum Spectrum
"Fed Up and Low Down"	2004	Blues Explosion	Damage
"Grand Ol' Party Crash"	2005	Cage	Hell's Winter
"Kamikaze 108"	2005	Teriyaki Boyz	Beef or Chicken?
"4 Freaks"	2006	Keak da Sneak, Turf Talk, Mistah F.A.B., Droop-E	Thizz Iz Allndadoe
"Closer"	2006	DJ Fresh, MC Darrison, Sally Dury	Escape from Planet Monday
"Say What You Want"	2011	Lateef the Truth Speaker	Firewater
"Found It"	2020	Barny Fletcher	CANVAS2023

=== Guest appearances ===
List of non-single guest appearances, with other performing artists, showing year released and album name
Title	Year	Other artist(s)	Album
"BASIC Mega-Mix"	1992	none	BASIC Beats Sampler
"Duality"	1995	DJ Krush	Meiso
"Groove Robber #1 in the Act"	1995	The Solesides Crew	Radio Sole 1
"Live at Barony (Freestyles 6/94)"	1995	Lateef the Truth Speaker, Gift of Gab, Lyrics Born	Radio Sole 1
"Untitled Heavy Beat (Part 1 & 2)"	1997	none	The End of Violence (soundtrack)
"Concentration"	1999	Jurassic 5, Quannum MC's	Quannum Spectrum
"Divine Intervention"	1999	Divine Styler	Quannum Spectrum
"The Extravaganza"	1999	Quannum MC's, Souls of Mischief	Quannum Spectrum
"Flashback"	2001	none	Turntables by the Bay
"Emerge"	2003	Lifesavas, Blackalicious, Lateef the Truth Speaker, Lyrics Born	Spirit in Stone
"Bring Madlib Up"	2004	none	Keepintime: A Live Recording
"The Last Trumpet (Halou Remix)"	2005	Lyrics Born, Lateef the Truth Speaker	Same !@#$ Different Day
"Exhale Therapy"	2014	ConRank	Exhale Therapy
"Conversations With Angels"	2016	Dedekind Cut, Chino Amobi	$uccessor

=== Remix work ===
List of remix work for other artists, showing year released and album name
Title	Year	Other artist(s)	Album
"Doin' Damage in My Native Language" (Shadow's Legitimate Mix)	1992	Zimbabwe Legit	Zimbabwe Legit
"Real Deal" (Shadow Remix)	1992	Lifers Group	BASIC Beats Sampler
"Meiso" (Klub Mix)/(Instrumental Mix)	1996	DJ Krush	"Meiso"
"Waiting List" (DJ Shadow / Automator Mix)	1996	Dr. Octagon	Dr. Octagonecologyst
"Painkiller" (Kill the Pain Remix)	1998	Depeche Mode	"Only When I Lose Myself"
"The Gloaming" (DJ Shadow Remix)	2004	Radiohead	"The Gloaming"
"Fed Up And Low Down" (DJ Shadow Radio Edit)	2004	The Jon Spencer Blues Explosion	Damage
"We Might as Well Be Strangers" (DJ Shadow Remix)	2004	Keane	Hopes and Fears
"Uncharted: The Eldorado Megamix"	2007	Greg Edmonson	Uncharted: Drake’s Fortune (Original Soundtrack)
"Handlebars" (DJ Shadow Remix)	2008	Flobots	"Handlebars"
"Motorstorm: Apocalypse" (DJ Shadow Remix)	2011	Klaus Badelt	Motorstorm: Apocalypse soundtrack
"Eyesdontlie" (DJ Shadow Remix)	2013	Machinedrum	"Eyesdontlie"
"Here's a Little Something for Ya" (DJ Shadow Wet Remix)	2013	Beastie Boys	"Lee Majors Come Again"
"90s Music" (DJ Shadow x Salva Remix)	2014	Kimbra	The Golden Echo
"Dona Nobis Pacem" (DJ Shadow Remix)	2014	Supersister	"Dona Nobis Pacem"
"Power Curve" (DJ Shadow x Bleep Bloop Remix)	2016	Hybrid	Driveclub (soundtrack)
"Swan Song" (DJ Shadow and Nastynasty Remix)	2019	Dua Lipa	Swan Song (From The Motion Picture "Alita: Battle Angel") (Remixes)
"Digital Bath" (DJ Shadow Remix)	2020	Deftones	White Pony (20th Anniversary Deluxe Edition)
"Black Hot Soup" (DJ Shadow "My Own Reality" Re-Write)	2021	King Gizzard & the Lizard Wizard	Butterfly 3001
"Passed Tense" (DJ Shadow Future Passed Remix)	2023	George Fitzgerald feat. Panda Bear	Stellar Drifting

== Music videos ==
List of music videos, showing year released and director
Title	Year	Director(s)
"High Noon"	1996	Brian Cross
"Midnight in a Perfect World"	1996	Brian Cross
"Mashin' on the Motorway"	2002	Ben Stokes, Doug Carney
"Walkie Talkie"	2002	Ben Stokes
"Six Days"	2002	Wong Kar-wai
"You Can't Go Home Again"	2002	Paul Gore
"3 Freaks" (featuring Keak da Sneak and Turf Talk)	2005	Mickey Finnegan
"Enuff" (featuring Lateef the Truth Speaker and Q-Tip)	2006	Rojo
"You Made It" (featuring Chris James)	2006	Adam Bartley
"This Time (I'm Gonna Try It My Way)"	2006	Mykola Dosenko
"I'm Excited" (featuring Afrikan Boy)	2011	Ian Pons Jewell
"I Gotta Rokk (Metal Madness)"	2011	Unknown
"Border Crossing"	2011	Dean Fernando
"Scale It Back" (featuring Little Dragon)	2011	Ewan Jones Morris, Casey Raymond
"Listen" (featuring Terry Reid)	2012	Franck Trebillac
"The Mountain Will Fall"	2016	Marti Romances
"The Sideshow" (featuring Ernie Fresh)	2016	Joseph Armario
"Nobody Speak" (featuring Run the Jewels)	2016	Sam Pilling
"Three Ralphs"	2016	Ruffmercy
"Bergschrund" (featuring Nils Frahm)	2016	Matt Devine
"Corridors" (featuring Steven Price)	2017	Dan Emmerson
"Rocket Fuel" (featuring De La Soul)	2019	Unknown
"Rosie"	2019	Ben Stokes
"Slingblade"	2020	Unknown
"Ozone Scraper"	2023	Stefano Ottaviano
"You Played Me"	2023	The Reggies
"The Prophecy"	2023	Adam Warmington
