= The Liquid Amber EP =

EP by DJ Shadow
- Released: August 12, 2014
- Genre: Electronica, hip hop, trip hop
- Length: 11:21
- Label: Liquid Amber
- Producer: DJ Shadow

DJ Shadow chronology
The Less You Know, the Better (2011)	The Liquid Amber EP (2014)

The Liquid Amber EP is an EP by American music producer DJ Shadow. It was released for streaming on August 12, 2014 through DJ Shadow's official website and was later released on DJ Shadow's record label, Liquid Amber. The track "Ghost Town" was also released for free download.

== Background ==
The EP features two original songs and a Machinedrum remix of the track "Six Days", from The Private Press (2002). Both songs were written, programmed, and mixed by DJ Shadow. DJ Shadow described the EP as "the opening salvo in what I hope is a long string of music, by myself and others, on my new imprint." He also stated that the track "Ghost Town" was inspired by "many of the micro-genres within the future bass umbrella."

== Track listing ==
1. "Ghost Town" – 3:52
2. "Mob" – 3:08
3. "Six Days" (Machinedrum remix) – 4:21

== Personnel ==
- DJ Shadow – writing, composition, production, engineering
- Machinedrum – remixing (3)
