= Liquid Amber =

Liquid Amber may refer to:

- Liquid Amber (record label), launched by American music producer DJ Shadow
- The Liquid Amber EP, by DJ Shadow

== See also ==
- Liquidambar, the only genus in the flowering plant family Altingiaceae
