= Action-adventure (disambiguation) =

Topics referred to by the same term

Action-adventure game is a video game genre that combines elements of action and adventure games.

Action-adventure may also refer to:

- Action-adventure fiction, a hybrid of the action and adventure genres
- Action-adventure film, a hybrid of the action and adventure film genres
- Action-adventure comics, a hybrid of the action and adventure comics genres
- Action-Adventure, a working title for a Retro Studios video game whose assets were later used for Metroid Prime
- Action/Adventure, a 2004 album by Dealership (band)
- Action Adventure (album), 2023 album by DJ Shadow
