= Colonel Bagshot =

English rock band

- Also known as: Colonel Bagshot's Incredible Bucket Band, Colonel Bagshot
- Origin: Liverpool, England
- Genre: Psychedelic rock
- Labels: Polydor, Splash Records, Belsize Music, Goodtimes Records, Seelie Court
- Past members: Dave Dover; Collin Benn; Rod Stanson; Mike Byrne; Deg Fulwood; Brian Farrell; Terry McCusker; Mike Kontzole; Kenny Parry; Arthur Keravan; Roy Hesketh

Colonel Bagshot were an English rock band formed in the late 1960s in Liverpool, England. Originally called "Colonel Bagshot's Incredible Bucket Band" and having six members, they eventually became a four-piece band. Their final line-up included Brian Farrell (vocals, guitar, stylophone), Ken Parry (vocals, guitar, keyboards), Dave Dover (vocals, bass, keyboard), and Terry McCusker (vocals, drums). The band released several singles and one studio album (Oh What a Lovely War) in 1971, which included their best-known song, "Six Day War".

"Six Day War" was sampled on the 2002 DJ Shadow song "Six Days", by Mahmut Orhan on the 2018 song "6 Days", and by Pusha T in the 2022 song "Just So You Remember". The song "Six Day War" has been sampled and used in the computer game DJ Hero in 2009, and in the Marakovs Reveal Trailer for the game Call of Duty: Modern Warfare III.

An alternate recording of "Six Day War", featuring Ollie Halsall, was released in 2022. This was along with a copy of the original "Oh What a Lovely War!" Vinyl, as a re-release by Seelie Court Records. In 2026, "Six Day War" the CD was released by Brian Farrell. All songs were written by Farrell and some of the songs have the members of Colonel Bagshots, though it also features Viv Stanshall, Andy Roberts, Zoot Money, Gerry Conway, Brian Jones, Judd Lander, Big Jim Sullivan, Chas Hodges, Dave Peacock, Tony Green, Bob Galvin and Mike Gregory.

== Discography ==
Albums

- Oh, What a Lovely War (Cadet Concept, 1971)
- Oh, What a Lovely War (Goodtime Seelie court records, [Vinyl] 2022)
- Six Day War (Seelie Court AX007CD) [CD] June 2026)

Singles

- "Oh Happy Day" (Disques Vogue, 1969)
- "Smile" (Parlophone, 1971)
- "Georgia Fireball" (Parlophone, 1971)
- "Dirty Delilah Blues" (Polydor, 1972)
- "She's My Sun" (Polydor, 1973)
