= The Mountain Will Fall =

2016 album by DJ Shadow

Studio album by DJ Shadow
- Released: June 24, 2016
- Genre: Instrumental hip hop; electronic
- Length: 49:37
- Label: Mass Appeal
- Producer: DJ Shadow

DJ Shadow chronology
The Less You Know, the Better (2011)	The Mountain Will Fall (2016)	Our Pathetic Age (2019)

Singles from The Mountain Will Fall
- 1. "Nobody Speak" Released: April 16, 2016

The Mountain Will Fall is the fifth studio album by American music producer DJ Shadow. It was released on June 24, 2016 by Mass Appeal Records. A tenth anniversary edition of the album was released on July 10, 2026.

== Critical reception ==
Professional ratings
Aggregate scores
Source	Rating
AnyDecentMusic?	6.2/10
Metacritic	66/100
Review scores
Source	Rating
AllMusic	3.5/5 stars
The A.V. Club	B+
Chicago Tribune	3/4 stars
The Guardian	4/5 stars
The Independent	2/5 stars
NME	2/5
Pitchfork	6.6/10
Q	4/5 stars
Spin	7/10
Uncut	7/10

The Mountain Will Fall received generally positive reviews from critics. At Metacritic, which assigns a normalized rating out of 100 to reviews from mainstream publications, the album received an average score of 66, based on 26 reviews. Adam Workman from The National said DJ Shadow gave his "sample-heavy, largely instrumental hip-hop" music a more "ambitious scope" than on his previous records, while Spin journalist Brian Josephs believed his "brisk electronic direction" contributed to a coherence that was missing on The Outsider (2006) and The Less You Know, the Better (2011). Exclaim!'s Daryl Keating said "he still has the chops to cut a good record when he's not doing a complete gear change and then turning down the wrong road at full speed." Robert Christgau gave The Mountain Will Fall a three-star honorable mention in his column for Vice, deeming it DJ Shadow's best album since The Private Press (2002) but "a sound effects record by comparison, heavy on first-rate texture, rumble, and of course beats"; he named "Nobody Speak", "Mambo", and the title track as highlights.

== Track listing ==
No.	Title	Length
1.	"The Mountain Will Fall"	4:38
2.	"Nobody Speak" (featuring Run the Jewels)	3:15
3.	"Three Ralphs"	3:36
4.	"Bergschrund" (featuring Nils Frahm)	4:10
5.	"The Sideshow" (featuring Ernie Fresh)	3:28
6.	"Depth Charge"	4:53
7.	"Mambo"	3:03
8.	"Ashes to Oceans" (featuring Matthew Halsall)	6:16
9.	"Pitter Patter" (featuring G Jones & Bleep Bloop)	3:24
10.	"California"	4:29
11.	"Ghost Town"	3:51
12.	"Suicide Pact"	4:36
Total length:		49:37

iTunes bonus track
No.	Title	Length
13.	"Swerve"	3:12
Total length:		52:49

== Charts ==
=== Weekly charts ===
Chart (2016)	Peak position
Australian Albums (ARIA)	31
Austrian Albums (Ö3 Austria)	41
Belgian Albums (Ultratop Flanders)	21
Belgian Albums (Ultratop Wallonia)	75
Canadian Albums (Billboard)	93
Dutch Albums (Album Top 100)	81
French Albums (SNEP)	106
German Albums (Offizielle Top 100)	57
Irish Albums (IRMA)	65
New Zealand Heatseekers Albums (RMNZ)	3
Swiss Albums (Schweizer Hitparade)	23
UK Albums (Official Charts)	19
US Billboard 200	77
US Top Dance Albums (Billboard)	1

=== Year-end charts ===
Chart (2016)	Position
US Dance/Electronic Albums (Billboard)	18
