= Country Funk 1969–1975 =

Compilation album by Various artists
- Released: July 24, 2012
- Recorded: 1969–1975
- Genre: Country; funk
- Length: 58:49
- Label: Light in the Attic Records
- Producer: Zach Cowie; Matt Sullivan; Patrick McCarthy

Country Funk 1969–1975 is a compilation album released on July 24, 2012 by Light in the Attic Records. The compilation represents selections from an obscure offshoot of country and funk music, deemed "country funk".

== Background ==
Country funk
- Stylistic origins: Country; funk; gospel; blues
- Cultural origins: Late 1960s-Early 1970s

Other topics
- Country rock; country gospel; roots rock; country blues

The compilation represents selections from an obscure offshoot of country and funk music, deemed "country funk". Jessica Hundley of The New York Times describes country funk as "an inherently defiant genre […] a style that encompasses the elation of gospel with the sexual thrust of the blues, country hoedown harmony with inner city grit. It is both studio slick and barroom raw." Country funk has been described as geographically diverse: "There was no central label or venue around which its practitioners congregated [...] Instead, these tracks are points on a map, representing nearly every corner of America and seemingly endless musical possibilities." Its peak period has been described as a "curious, glorious moment in musical history when dirty, long-haired country-rockers reclaimed hillbilly music from the slicksters who dominated mainstream country, refashioning the music in their own defiant image."

The compilation was produced by Zach Cowie, Matt Sullivan and Patrick McCarthy; the tracks were remastered by John Baldwin at John Baldwin Mastering.

== Reception ==
Professional ratings
Review scores
Source	Rating
Allmusic	4/5 stars
The A.V. Club	(favorable)
The Boston Globe	4/5 stars
Pitchfork Media	8.4/10
PopMatters	7/10
Rolling Stone	4/5 stars
Uncut	4/5 stars

Country Funk 1969–1975 received very positive reviews from contemporary music publications. Pitchfork Media gave the compilation an 8.4 out 10, with Stephen M. Deusner writing that "More than any genre or style, that sense of effusive engagement with such a wide range of materials and perspectives binds these artists together, no matter how disparate their background or their music." Thom Jurek of Allmusic described the music represented as an illumination of "a brief but fruitful period where genre lines blurred, and both genres benefitted mightily." PopMatters' Matthew Fiander called the compilation "an awfully impressive feat […] Rather than dig into a genre we already know, or mine a famous part of musical history for new ideas—or worse, old ideas repackaged—this disc proposes a new idea, that some unified thing was happening, even if the people involved weren’t totally aware of it, even if we hadn't given it a name, until now." Nathan Rabin of The A.V. Club wrote that Country Funk "unforgettably chronicles a moment and a movement long overdue for a revival while highlighting the furtively multi-cultural, freewheeling, and loose roots of a quintessentially American art form."

== Track listing ==
No.	Title	Writer(s)	Artist	Length
1.	"L.A. Memphis Tyler Texas"	Dale Hawkins; Randy Fouts	Dale Hawkins	2:45
2.	"Hello L.A., Bye-Bye Birmingham"	Delaney Bramlett; Mac Davis	John Randolph Marr	3:04
3.	"Georgia Morning Dew"	Margaret Lewis; Myra Smith	Johnny Adams	3:20
4.	"Lucas Was a Redneck"	Mac Davis	Mac Davis	2:50
5.	"Light Blue"	Bobby Darin	Bob Darin	3:39
6.	"I Wanta Make Her Love Me"	Henry Cosby; Lula Mae Hardaway; Sylvia Moy; Stevie Wonder	Jim Ford	3:10
7.	"Hawg Frog"	Buzz Clifford	Gray Fox	3:26
8.	"Fire and Brimstone"	Link Wray	Link Wray	4:21
9.	"Street People"	Robert Guidry	Bobby Charles	3:45
10.	"Funky Business"	Joe Donaldson; Craig Krampf	Cherokee	2:40
11.	"Stud Spider"	Tony Joe White	Tony Joe White	5:38
12.	"Piledriver"	Dennis Caldirola	Dennis The Fox	5:11
13.	"Ohoopee River Bottomland"	Larry Jon Wilson	Larry Jon Wilson	3:45
14.	"He Made a Woman Out of Me"	Don Hill; Fred Burch	Bobbie Gentry	2:34
15.	"Bayou Country"	Duke Bardwell; Trevor Veitch	Gritz	2:57
16.	"I Walk on Gilded Splinters"	John Creaux	Johnny Jenkins	5:50
Total length:				58:49

== Personnel ==
Information adapted from liner notes.

Production

- Zach Cowie – producer, images and archival material
- Matt Sullivan – producer, executive producer
- Patrick McCarthy – producer, project coordinator, images and archival material
- Josh Wright – executive producer
- Jessica Hundley – liner notes
- Jess Rotter – illustration
- Henry Owings – design
- Chunklet Graphic Control – design
- John Baldwin – remastering
- Dick Monda – images and archival material
- Eothen Alapatt – images and archival material
- Featherbeard – images and archival material
