= Uncharted: Drake's Fortune (soundtrack) =

2007 soundtrack

Uncharted: Drake's Fortune Original Soundtrack from the Video Game

Soundtrack album to Uncharted: Drake's Fortune by Greg Edmonson
- Released: November 20, 2007
- Recorded: Skywalker Sound (Marin County, California)
- Genre: Video game music
- Length: 60:44
- Label: Sony Computer Entertainment
- Producer: Jonathan Mayer; Clint Bajakian; DJ Shadow

Uncharted series chronology
Uncharted: Drake's Fortune Original Soundtrack from the Video Game (2007)	Uncharted 2: Among Thieves Original Soundtrack from the Video Game (2009)

Uncharted: Drake's Fortune Original Soundtrack from the Video Game is the soundtrack to the 2007 action-adventure video game Uncharted: Drake's Fortune, developed by Naughty Dog. Composed by Greg Edmonson and performed by the Skywalker Session Orchestra, it was released on November 20, 2007 by the game's publisher, Sony Computer Entertainment.

== Production ==
The music in Uncharted: Drake's Fortune was composed by Greg Edmonson, marking his first work on a video game. He first became involved in scoring the music for the game after being invited to produce a piece for an E3 trailer by developer Naughty Dog. Speaking about the composition process, Edmonson has revealed that he was "very afraid" about the project, noting that he "came in very late in the process – near the end of the game’s completion", which limited the time he had to produce the soundtrack.

In composing the music for the game, Edmonson consciously avoided including too many melodies in the music in order to prevent repetition. He has also noted that due to the setting of the game, which featured many jungle and underground environments, "a more ambient approach worked". Edmonson was also influenced by his previous work on the television series Firefly, comparing both works in their combination of "ethnic instruments with orchestral stuff".

The score was performed by the Skywalker Session Orchestra and recorded at Skywalker Sound, a studio in California owned and operated by Lucasfilm. Production was led by Jonathan Mayar and Clint Bajakian, with Alan Steinberger contributing arrangements and orchestration.

== Release ==
The Uncharted: Drake's Fortune soundtrack was released on November 20, 2007 by Sony Computer Entertainment as a digital download, the day after the North American release of the game. A four-track sampler featuring "Uncharted: The El Dorado Megamix", "Drake's Elegy", "Nate's Theme" and "Sanctuary?" was previously released on November 12.

== Reception ==
Writing for the website Square Enix Music Online, Jay Semerad awarded the Uncharted: Drake's Fortune soundtrack a rating of eight out of ten. The writer hailed the style of the music as "simple, understated and yet compelling", praising Edmonson's combination of "orchestral strings, brass and percussion into a powerful score". Semerad highlighted tracks such as "Unwelcomed Guests" and "El Goddamn Dorado", concluding that "Edmonson's score ... is enough to stand on its own as an effective backing track and transcend into the realm of other great orchestral game soundtracks that have preceded it". British radio station Classic FM named the soundtrack one of "15 great computer game scores", praising in particular "Nate's Theme" which they described as featuring "a thoroughly cinematic dynamic".

== Track listing ==
All music is composed by Greg Edmonson.

No.	Title	Length
1.	"Nate's Theme"	1:46
2.	"Grave Robbing"	2:01
3.	"Sir Francis Drake"	1:07
4.	"The Search for El Dorado"	2:50
5.	"Uncharted Island"	3:08
6.	"Plane-Wrecked"	2:56
7.	"The Fortress"	2:03
8.	"Unlocking the Past"	3:36
9.	"Drowned City"	2:11
10.	"Trapped"	4:24
11.	"Heading Upriver"	2:36
12.	"Sanctuary?"	4:24
13.	"Treasure Vault"	3:25
14.	"A Bitter End"	1:12
15.	"Unwelcome Guests"	4:49
16.	"The Bunker"	4:37
17.	"Drake's Elegy"	1:57
18.	"El Goddamn Dorado"	3:06
19.	"Showdown"	2:26
20.	"Uncharted Theme"	1:53
21.	"Uncharted: The El Dorado Megamix"	4:17
Total length:		60:44

Sampler album
No.	Title	Length
1.	"Uncharted: The El Dorado Megamix"	4:17
2.	"Drake's Elegy"	1:57
3.	"Nate's Theme"	1:46
4.	"Sanctuary?"	4:24
Total length:		12:24

== Personnel ==
- Jonathan Mayar – production, mixing, mastering, editing
- Clint Bajakian – production
- DJ Shadow – production and mixing (track 21)
- Alan Steinberger – arrangements, orchestration
- Skywalker Session Orchestra – performance
- J. Eric Schmidt – conductor, orchestration
- Leslie Ann Jones – engineering
- Dann Thompson – engineering
- Robert Gatley – engineering
- Andre Zweers – Pro Tools
- Marc Senasac – mixing, mastering, editing
- Joel Yarger – mixing, mastering, editing
