= The Private Repress =

2003 remix album by DJ Shadow

Remix album by DJ Shadow
- Released: March 29, 2003
- Genre: Hip hop
- Length: 48:20
- Label: Island
- Producer: DJ Shadow

DJ Shadow chronology
The Private Press (2002)	The Private Repress (2003)	Live! In Tune and On Time (2004)

Professional ratings
Review scores
Source	Rating
Mowno	favorable
Seattle Weekly	mixed

The Private Repress is a remix album by American hip hop producer DJ Shadow, released exclusively in Japan by Island Records on March 29, 2003. It contains the remixed tracks and the B-side tracks from The Private Press.

== Track listing ==
No.	Title	Length
1.	"Intro"	1:19
2.	"Six Days (Soulwax mix)"	5:18
3.	"GDMFSOB (Unkle uncensored)"	6:25
4.	"Interlude"	0:20
5.	"Walkie Talkie (Extended radio edit)"	3:15
6.	"Six Days (Remix)"	3:52
7.	"Disavowed"	4:29
8.	"Interlude"	0:36
9.	"Right Thing (Tokio ghetto tech remix)"	6:44
10.	"Mashin' on the Motorway (Radio edit)"	2:39
11.	"Right Thing (Z-Trip 'get the party off mix' in three parts)"	6:19
12.	"Outro"	0:55

Enhanced CD videos
No.	Title	Length
1.	"Walkie Talkie"	2:27
2.	"Six Days"	3:42

== Personnel ==
Credits adapted from liner notes.

- DJ Shadow – production, arrangement, design
- Keith Tamashiro – design
- B+ – photography

== Additional personnel ==
- Sora (also 12), DJ Yas, Force of Nature, DJ Tus-One, Yusuke, Ryuhei, and Muro (1)
- Roots Manuva (3)
- Ape Sounds (4)
- Mos Def (6)
- DJ Krush (8)
- Dai Kurihara (12)
