= Preemptive Strike (album) =

1998 compilation album by DJ Shadow

Compilation album by DJ Shadow
- Released: 13 January 1998
- Genre: Instrumental hip hop; trip hop
- Length: 61:11
- Label: Mo' Wax
- Producer: DJ Shadow

DJ Shadow chronology
Endtroducing..... (1996)	Preemptive Strike (1998)	The Private Press (2002)

Preemptive Strike is the first compilation album by American hip hop producer DJ Shadow, released by Mo' Wax on 13 January 1998. It contains DJ Shadow's singles released by Mo' Wax between 1993 and 1997. It peaked at number 118 on the Billboard 200 chart.

According to Shadow, "The title was in reference to what I felt was a general lack of care for my music on the US label side, and my aim was to compile the earlier Mo' Wax output in a manner of my choosing rather than it happening surreptitiously."

== Critical reception ==
Professional ratings
Review scores
Source	Rating
AllMusic	4/5 stars
Chicago Tribune	3/4 stars
Christgau's Consumer Guide	(1-star Honorable Mention)
Entertainment Weekly	B
Los Angeles Times	3/4 stars
Pitchfork	8.4/10
Rolling Stone	3/5 stars
The Rolling Stone Album Guide	4/5 stars

Ryan Schreiber of Pitchfork wrote, "These 11 tracks document Shadow's evolution from just a kid with a turntable to a full-blown, steady-rockin' brother with soul." Soren Baker of Chicago Tribune commented that "Sound bytes from old records and instructional tapes make brief appearances, but his spacey sound beds yield far more than just a group of cleverly arranged tape splices." Stephen Thomas Erlewine of AllMusic called it "a nice summation of DJ Shadow's most important singles through the end of 1997."

== Track listing ==
All tracks are written by Josh Davis, except where noted.

No.	Title	Writer(s)	Length
1.	"Strike 1"		0:26
2.	"In/Flux"		12:12
3.	"Hindsight"		6:52
4.	"Strike 2"		0:15
5.	"What Does Your Soul Look Like (Part 2)"		13:51
6.	"What Does Your Soul Look Like (Part 3)"		5:12
7.	"What Does Your Soul Look Like (Part 4)"	J. Davis; Jeffrey Bova	7:12
8.	"What Does Your Soul Look Like (Part 1)"	J. Davis; Shawn Phillips	6:21
9.	"Strike 3 (and I'm Out)"		0:26
10.	"High Noon"	J. Davis; Ernie Orosco	3:57
11.	"Organ Donor (Extended Overhaul)"		4:26

Limited edition CD bonus disc
No.	Title	Length
1.	"Camel Bobsled Race" (DJ Shadow megamix by DJ Q-Bert)	24:03

Japanese edition CD bonus tracks
No.	Title	Writer(s)	Length
12.	"Number Song" (Cut Chemist remix)		5:10
13.	"Painkiller" (Kill the Pain mix; DJ Shadow vs. Depeche Mode)	Martin L. Gore	6:32

Tracks 1, 4 and 9 are not included on the vinyl edition.

"What Does Your Soul Look Like (Part 2)" samples Foreigner's "Girl on The Moon", from the album 4.

== Personnel ==
Credits adapted from liner notes.

- DJ Shadow – production

== Charts ==
Chart (1998)	Peak position
US Billboard 200	118
US Heatseekers Albums (Billboard)	1
