= Brian Farrell =

Brian Farrell may refer to:

- Brian Farrell (broadcaster) (1929–2014), Irish author, journalist, academic and broadcaster
- Brian Farrell (Gaelic footballer), Gaelic footballer from County Meath, Ireland
- Brian Farrell (ice hockey) (born 1972), retired American ice hockey player
- Brian Farrell (bishop) (born 1944), Roman Catholic bishop
- Brian D. Farrell, professor of biology and curator in entomology
- Brian Farrell (lacrosse) (born 1988), lacrosse player
