= Funky Skunk =

Funky Skunk, a mix album released in late summer 2005, has been framed within the project Public Works billed as a DJ Shadow/Obey reconstruction and co-production between Josh Davis (DJ Shadow) and Shepard Fairey, in concordance with a product line of shirts, stickers and box set.

== Sample sources ==
- "Baby Mama" by Three 6 Mafia
- "Full Time" by Yo Gotti
- "What Happened to that Boy?" by Baby
- "Play" (instrumental) by David Banner
- "Burn Rubber" by Too Short
- "We Like Them Girls" by Silkk the Shocker
- "Do the Granny" by New Birth
- "Natural Juices" by Magnum
- "The Corner" by Common
- "Never Scared" by BoneCrusher
- "Piledriver" by Dennis The Fox
- "Stud Spider" by Tony Joe White
