= The Less You Know, the Better =

2011 album by DJ Shadow

Studio album by DJ Shadow
- Released: September 30, 2011
- Recorded: 2009–11
- Genres: Hip-hop; instrumental hip hop; trip hop; electronica
- Length: 59:22
- Label: Island
- Producer: DJ Shadow

DJ Shadow chronology
The Outsider (2006)	The Less You Know, the Better (2011)	The Mountain Will Fall (2016)

Singles from The Less You Know, the Better
- 1. "I've Been Trying" Released: September 2010; 2. "I Gotta Rokk" Released: May 17, 2011; 3. "Warning Call" Released: September 7, 2011; 4. "Scale It Back" Released: November 4, 2011

The Less You Know, the Better is the fourth studio album by American hip hop producer DJ Shadow, released on September 30, 2011, by Island Records. As with his previous efforts, it relies extensively on samples, which span different genres and time periods. The album sees Shadow exploring many genres and production styles, from fast-paced tracks prominently featuring guitars and scratching to slow tracks featuring pianos. Contributions came from a wide range of artists, including Talib Kweli, Afrikan Boy, Posdnuos, and Tom Vek.

The album received mixed to positive reviews, with critics being divided over its mix of styles. General consensus among critics was that despite its shortcomings, it was an overall solid effort and an improvement over Shadow's previous album The Outsider (2006). The album's release was preceded by the singles "Def Surrounds Us" / "I've Been Trying" and "I Gotta Rokk", as well as the EPs Scale It Back and I'm Excited.

== Background and development ==
After the release of his 2006 album The Outsider, Shadow brought his focus less on the production of new material. However, on March 7, 2009, he announced that he was working on music for a new album. Though no release date was given, he assured that "it [would] sound different from the last one". Speaking about recording sessions for the album, Shadow stated that "the hardcore work started just after Thanksgiving of 2009." He stated that he worked "at least eight-plus hours a day at least five or six days a week" and that the making of the album took about a year.

In the time leading up to the release of the album, Shadow would gradually release preview material from the album. The first of the new music to be revealed was a preview of the track "Def Surrounds Us", announced to be from his then-untitled fourth album. More material was revealed in an August 2010 gig in Antwerp, Belgium, where Shadow played some tracks he claimed to be from his upcoming album, though stating that the album was not yet ready and that he would continue working toward having it ready for his 2011 tour. The full version of "Def Surrounds Us", along with another track, "I've Been Trying", were also revealed by Shadow on Zane Lowe's BBC Radio 1 show, followed by a limited single release featuring the two tracks.

Finally, on May 10, 2011, DJ Shadow confirmed via his Facebook page and official website that his new album, revealed to be entitled The Less You Know, the Better, was finished and that it would be released the following September.

Problems faced during the album's development included copyright and sample clearance problems, which led to the withdrawal of an EP released in support of the album, I'm Excited, and delays on the album's release. After these problems were resolved, a final release date in September was announced.

Asked to review the album, Shadow described the album as "beautiful", and stated that he hoped the album would be "timeless" and not restricted to any time period. He also explained that he wanted the album to be able to "appeal to the minds of people, and have them accept what I've done."

"I don't put out a record every year so I can see what others are doing and learn from that and see things that are happening. So I feel that a good record from me never defines 2011 -- it should be totally timeless and be able to live in any era. I think I've done that with this one. It's different at times [...] but I don't think it's a huge departure from anything I've ever done. And I think my fans who have been there since Endtroducing will really like this one."

== Themes ==
Shadow has connected many themes to various aspects of the album. Speaking about the album's title, The Less You Know, the Better, Shadow explained:

"Any good album title has multiple meanings, and I like choosing titles where I find myself repeating it, almost like a mantra. But this one's partly about being stuck overnight at some airport terminal in Dallas and having CNN and Fox blasting my brain out for no apparent reason. I always just sit there and say, 'Who asked for this?'"

In the last ten years technology has been so aggressively marketed to us, but there's no conscience on the internet saying, "Hey, what if we're moving too quickly here?"

— DJ Shadow, 2011.

A theme that Shadow frequently connects to the album's title and artwork is the influence of technology in modern times. When asked what the album's title referred to, Shadow explained about what he felt was the aggressive marketing of technology in modern times. The Internet has also been frequently mentioned by Shadow when describing the album's title; he stated that he believes that the Internet "has been sold to us as our savior" and that as a person working in an industry "decimated by the Internet", he has experienced "a weird duality: the internet was supposed to democratize communication, but the opposite seems to have happened." The album's cover, designed by American artist Tony Papesh, depicts a smartphone painting over the album's title; the album's cover has been connected with Shadow's stand on technology, as well as single covers and other promotional art for the album.

Shadow explained that the album's title also referred to the experiences of recording artists in the year 2011: he described some of these experiences as "a bit silly." He also described the difficulty for an artist to gain attention, explaining: "It's really hard to get people to pay attention if all you're doing is putting out an album. It only matters to people if you're wearing a meat dress or slagging off your peers or generally behaving like an ass. So it's satire and I'm the butt of the joke."

== Release ==
On May 10, 2011, DJ Shadow confirmed via his Facebook page that the album would be released in September. The same day, he also released an EP called I Gotta Rokk, which contained remixes of material from the album. This was followed by the release of another EP, I'm Excited, on July 29, 2011. However, copyright problems caused the withdrawal of the EP and delays on the release of The Less You Know, the Better.

Shadow then stated that the album would be released on September 5. However, delays pushed the album's release to its final release date of October 3, 2011.

== Singles ==
The album's first single, the double A-side release "Def Surrounds Us" / "I've Been Trying", was shipped to selected record stores in the United States and the United Kingdom and placed in other random European stores in September 2010 to coincide with Shadow's tour in the continent. Terming the practice as "shop-placing", Shadow released the single in vinyl format beforehand because of his belief that "downloads are so impersonal and soulless." Each 12-inch vinyl copy of the single features its own distinct sleeve design, most of which originated from drawings by Shadow's children; some copies bear stickers reading "Please add to the artwork before you pass it along." The tracks were later made available to download on his official website on September 13, while a release to the iTunes Store followed a week later.

The second single from The Less You Know, the Better, "I Gotta Rokk", was released on May 17, 2011, as a digital EP featuring the title track and remixes of tracks from the album. Nate Patrin of Pitchfork wrote that the EP's tracks "suggest a new direction more along the lines of what people expected from [Shadow] 10 years ago" and graded the release 7.0/10. It was later featured on the Super Bowl XLIX TV spot for the 2015 film Terminator Genisys. "I'm Excited", featuring Afrikan Boy, was premiered on DJ Zane Lowe's BBC Radio 1 program on July 7, 2011, and was intended to be the follow-up single in promotion of the album. However, the release of an accompanying EP was shelved due to issues involving an uncleared sample on its title track, which was ultimately excluded from the final track listing of The Less You Know, the Better. The music video for "I'm Excited", directed by Ian Pons Jewell, was released on August 24, 2011.

"Warning Call", featuring Tom Vek, was made available for free download on DJ Shadow's official website on September 7, 2011, to those who liked the artist's Facebook page. Upon official release as a single, it peaked at number 39 on the Billboard Mexico Ingles Airplay chart. On December 4, 2011, "Scale It Back", featuring Little Dragon, was released as the album's fourth overall single. It peaked at number 28 on the Mexico Ingles Airplay chart and at number 43 on the Belgian Ultratip singles chart for the region of Flanders. The music video for "Scale It Back", released on November 10, 2010, was directed by Ewan Jones Morris and Casey Raymond and consists of a single long take highlighting various subjects, including a pterodactyl, a Viking, and a puppet monkey. "Come on Riding (Through the Cosmos)" was issued as a limited edition 7-inch single for Record Store Day on April 18, 2012, with all proceeds going to the Teenage Cancer Trust. To coincide with the release, the organizers of the Secret 7" project held a contest inviting artists to send in their designs for the single's record sleeve.

== Critical reception ==
Professional ratings
Aggregate scores
Source	Rating
AnyDecentMusic?	6.0/10
Metacritic	62/100
Review scores
Source	Rating
AllMusic	4/5 stars
The A.V. Club	B−
The Daily Telegraph	4/5 stars
The Guardian	3/5 stars
The Independent	3/5 stars
NME	5/10
Pitchfork	4.5/10
Q	3/5 stars
Rolling Stone	3.5/5 stars
Spin	6/10

At Metacritic, which assigns a normalised rating out of 100 to reviews from mainstream critics, The Less You Know, the Better received an average score of 62, indicating "generally favorable reviews", based on 25 reviews. Andrew Perry of The Daily Telegraph wrote positively of the album, stating that it upholds the "pioneering spirit" of Shadow's debut release Endtroducing..... by "regularly straying from the constrictions of classic hip hop." John Bush of AllMusic cited The Less You Know, the Better as "one of the most entertaining albums of the year, with countless moments of brilliance" and wrote that it "sounds closer to his classic Endtroducing..... than any of his others, as though Shadow's finally willing to embrace his career landmark instead of constantly play against type." Writing for Rolling Stone, Will Hermes wrote that while the album "may lack his debut's soul-jazz seamlessness, it compensates with bipolar freakiness."

The Guardian's Dave Simpson described the album as "a hit-and-miss affair", while Spin's Rob Harvilla similarly characterized it as "equal parts frustrating and admirable", though also "nowhere near as antagonistic as 2006's hyphy-saturated The Outsider". David Amidon of PopMatters wrote that "anyone who picks up The Less You Know has a right to be disappointed, especially considering the name of the artist on the spine." However, he nonetheless described the album as a "perfectly enjoyable listen" in spite of its shortcomings and a "return to form for Shadow, his best work since Private Press, and, most importantly, fun to listen to." Greg Kot of the Chicago Tribune gave most praise to the album's "dark, shape-shifting mood pieces".

While criticizing The Less You Know, the Better for what he felt was a lack of a coherent mood, describing it as "a highly schizophrenic collection", J.R. Moores of Drowned in Sound ultimately praised it as an improvement over The Outsider and "a step in the right direction." BBC Music writer Ian Wade acknowledged that while the album "will only ever stand in the vast shadow that its creator has cast since releasing the unprecedented Endtroducing, The Less You Know, the Better isn't a bad album at all, and will likely grow into something far more impressive, something that isn't quite evident on first play. Like The Private Press, it could be one the listener returns to down the line and wonders how it didn't initially click." Sam Richards of NME, however, felt that the album sounded "like the work of a man struggling to recall his motivations for making music in the first place."

== Track listing ==
No.	Title	Writer(s)	Length
1.	"Back to Front (Circular Logic)"	Josh Davis	2:04
2.	"Border Crossing"	Davis	3:36
3.	"Stay the Course" (featuring Talib Kweli and Posdnuos)	Davis, Talib Greene, Kelvin Mercer	3:36
4.	"I've Been Trying"	Davis	3:12
5.	"Sad and Lonely"	Davis, Gérald Boulet, Pierre Harel	3:09
6.	"Warning Call" (featuring Tom Vek)	Davis, Thomas Vernon	3:35
7.	"Tedium"	Davis	2:26
8.	"Enemy Lines"	Davis, Peter Agnew, Manny Charlton, Dennis McCafferty, Darrell Sweet	5:23
9.	"Going Nowhere"	Davis	0:28
10.	"Redeemed"	Davis, Stefan Fredin, Christer Åkerberg, Myrna Summers	4:26
11.	"Run for Your Life"	Davis	3:24
12.	"Give Me Back the Nights"	Davis	3:54
13.	"I Gotta Rokk"	Davis	6:29
14.	"Scale It Back" (featuring Little Dragon)	Davis, Erik Bodin, Yukimi Nagano, Fredrik Wallin, Arild Werling, Håkan Wirenstrand	4:16
15.	"Circular Logic (Front to Back)"	Davis, Klaus Krüger, Mike Rudd	4:55
16.	"(Not So) Sad and Lonely"	Davis, Boulet, Harel	4:29
Total length:			59:22

Deluxe edition bonus tracks
No.	Title	Writer(s)	Length
17.	"Come on Riding (Through the Cosmos)"	Davis, Paul Cotton	4:47
18.	"Def Surrounds Us"	Davis	7:37
19.	"Let's Get It (Bass, Bass, Bass)"	Davis	3:41
Total length:			75:27

Samples

- "Sad and Lonely" and "(Not So) Sad and Lonely" contain samples of "I'm Sad and I'm Lonely", performed by Susan Reed, and "Faut que j'me pousse", written by Gérald Boulet and Pierre Harel, and performed by Offenbach.
- "Warning Call" contains samples of "City Rises", performed by Saigon.
- "Enemy Lines" contains samples of "Loved and Lost", written by Peter Agnew, Manny Charlton, Dennis McCafferty and Darrell Sweet, and performed by Nazareth.
- "Redeemed" contains samples of "Andra Sidan", written by Stefan Fredin and Christer Åkerberg, and performed by Trettioåriga Kriget.
- "I Gotta Rokk" contains samples of "Woman" and "Shake Yourself Alive", performed by The Harlemans, and "Backseat Driver" and "Hot on Your Heels", performed by Steeler.
- "Circular Logic (Front to Back)" contains samples of "Disciplin", written and performed by Klaus Krüger, and "The Question", written by Mike Rudd, and performed by Spectrum.
- "Come on Riding (Through the Cosmos)" contains samples of "One Horse Blue", written by Paul Cotton, and performed by One Horse Blue.

== Personnel ==
Credits for The Less You Know, the Better adapted from album liner notes.

- Jim Abbiss – mixing
- Ross Allen – A&R
- Erik Bodin – composer, featured artist
- Jamal Chalabi – management
- Pagnew M. Charlton – composer
- John Dent – mastering
- Josh Davis – arrangement, composer, drum machine beats, mixing, production, scratching
- Mikael "Count" Eldridge – mixing
- Express Rising – additional production, remixing
- Talib Kweli – composer, featured artist, vocals
- Brett Lind – assistance
- Stanton Moore – drums
- Kelvin Mercer – composer, featured artist, vocals
- Yukimi Nagano – composer, featured artist, vocals
- Tony Papesh – artwork design
- Tony Peyrot – business management
- C. E. Rabinowitz – vocals
- Susan Reed – vocals
- Rob Seiver – licensing
- Rick Vargas – assistance
- Arild Werling – composer, featured artist
- Fredrik Wallin – composer, featured artist
- Håkan Wirenstrand – composer, featured artist
- Tom Vek – composer, featured artist, vocals
- Tim Young – mastering

== Charts ==
Chart (2011)	Peak position
Belgian Albums (Ultratop Flanders)	80
French Albums (SNEP)	118
Japanese Albums (Oricon)	86
UK Albums Chart (Official Charts Company)	34
US Billboard 200	149
US Billboard Dance/Electronic Albums	5

== Release history ==
Region	Date	Format	Edition	Label
Australia	September 30, 2011	Digital download	Standard	A&M Records
Australia	September 30, 2011	Digital download	Deluxe	A&M Records
United Kingdom	September 30, 2011	Digital download	Standard	A&M Records
United Kingdom	October 3, 2011	CD	Standard	Island Records
Canada	October 4, 2011	CD, digital download	Standard	A&M Records, Universal Music Group
United States	October 4, 2011	CD, digital download	Standard	A&M Records, Island Records, Roc-A-Fella Records
Italy	October 4, 2011	CD	Deluxe	Island Records
United States	October 4, 2011	Digital download	Deluxe	A&M Records
Australia	October 7, 2011	CD	Standard	A&M Records
Canada	October 18, 2011	LP	Standard	Verve Records
United States	November 8, 2011	LP	Standard	Island Records
