= Nobody Speak =

- Vinyl release cover art

Single by DJ Shadow featuring Run the Jewels

from the album The Mountain Will Fall
- B-side: "Instrumental and acapella versions"
- Released: April 16, 2016
- Recorded: 2015
- Genre: Hip hop
- Length: 3:16
- Label: Mass Appeal; Liquid Amber
- Songwriters: Josh Davis; Jaime Meline; Michael Render
- Producer: DJ Shadow

DJ Shadow singles chronology
"Ghost Town" (2014)	"Nobody Speak" (2016)	"Rocket Fuel" (2019)

Run the Jewels singles chronology
"Rubble Kings (Dynamite on the Street)" (2015)	"Nobody Speak" (2016)	"Talk to Me" (2016)

Music video
- "Nobody Speak" on YouTube

"Nobody Speak" is a song by American hip hop producer DJ Shadow, featuring rap verses from American rap duo Run the Jewels. The song was first a part of Run the Jewels' Record Store Day release, which was a virtual reality cardboard viewer that included a digital download code for the song. It also acted as the lead single from Shadow's fifth studio album, The Mountain Will Fall (2016). A music video for the song was released on August 24, 2016.

== Composition ==
"Nobody Speak" features rap verses from El-P and Killer Mike of rap duo Run the Jewels, who were credited as the song's writers alongside DJ Shadow. It contains a musical sample of "Ol' Man River" by Caterina Valente, and a lyrical sample from "Top Billin'" (from Audio Two's 1987 album What More Can I Say?).

The instrumental features a funk-like bass and drum groove, brass horns, as well as guitar loops. Shadow chose El-P and Killer Mike as collaborators due to their vocal style fitting the song's instrumental the most.

== Release ==
"Nobody Speak" was first made available through the Run the Jewels Record Store Day release. It consisted of a special virtual reality cardboard viewer, which held a code that granted the purchaser to a free digital download of the song. The song was eventually made available for a paid download through Mass Appeal Records. The song was later released as a limited edition 12" vinyl single on August 24, 2016, through Mass Appeal and Liquid Amber.

=== Part 2 ===
In June 2026, DJ Shadow released a remix to the song, titled "Nobody Speak Part 2", with additional features from Denzel Curry and TiaCorine. It was released as a single for the 10th anniversary reissue of The Mountain Will Fall.

== Music video ==
A music video for "Nobody Speak" was released on August 24, 2016. The video, which has been described as "brutal [and] politically charged", features political representatives in a meeting. The leaders of the groups begin a rap battle against each other, staged as a political debate, which after around 90 seconds turns into an all-out brawl involving virtually everyone in the meeting room in a form of legislative violence. One leader then prepares to impale his counterpart with an American flag. The video finishes with a cleaning lady entering the room, the brawl suddenly stopping, and everyone involved looking at her in shame.

The leaders of the groups are played by Igor Tsyshkevych and Ian Bailey. Shadow commented on the video, saying that they wanted to make a "positive, life-affirming video that captures politicians at their election-year best. We got this instead." Killer Mike also commented on the video, saying that "It's such a dope video ... it's what I really wish Trump and Hillary would just do and get it over with."

The video was directed by Sam Pilling and features cameo appearances of Shadow, El-P, and Killer Mike. It was filmed at the "Ukrainian Dim" (Ukrainian House) exhibition center in Kyiv, Ukraine.

== Use in media ==
The song has appeared in trailers for films including Suburbicon, Booksmart, and Good Boys.

The song is used briefly in Deadpool 2.

The song is used in The Happytime Murders during a brief fight scene.

A television ad campaign in 2021 for the electric Cadillac Lyriq automobile featured the instrumental portion of the song.

The song plays during the end credits for “My Dripping Sleep”, the 3rd episode of season 1 of Netflix’s drama Ozark.

The song also appears in "Prague", the 8th episode of season 1 of HBO's satirical dark comedy drama Succession.

The song also plays during the end credits of the first episode of season 3 of Silicon Valley.

The song was featured in the 2026 film Coyote Vs. Acme. For its appearance in the film, the profanity was censored with the Road Runner's "beep-beep" sound.

The song is also used during the title scene of "Murder Mix”, the fifth (5) episode of Season 2 of Netflix’s hit series Black Doves.

== Track listing ==
- Mass Appeal — MSAP0034 — Promotional CD-R and digital download single

No.	Title	Length
1.	"Nobody Speak" (featuring Run the Jewels)	3:16

- Mass Appeal / Liquid Amber — MSAP0036LP — 12" vinyl single

Side A
No.	Title	Length
1.	"Nobody Speak" (featuring Run the Jewels)	3:16

Side B
No.	Title	Length
1.	"Nobody Speak" (Instrumental)	3:16
2.	"Nobody Speak" (Acapella)	3:16

== Personnel ==
Personnel adapted from The Mountain Will Fall liner notes.

- Tim Burns – trombone
- DJ Shadow – arrangement, composing, mixing, production, programming
- El-P – composing, vocals
- Mikael Eldridge – mixing
- Killer Mike – composing, vocals
- Graham Pike – trumpet
- Jake Telford – baritone and tenor saxophone

== Charts ==
Chart (2016–2017)	Peak position
US Alternative Airplay (Billboard)	33
US Dance/Electronic Digital Songs (Billboard)	13
US Rap Digital Songs (Billboard)	40

== Certifications ==
Region	Certification	Certified units/sales
United States (RIAA)	Gold	500,000^{‡}
^{‡} Sales+streaming figures based on certification alone.
