= Midnight in a Perfect World =

Single by DJ Shadow

from the album Endtroducing.....
- B-side: "Mutual Slump"; "The Number Song"; "Red Bus Needs to Leave"; Remixes
- Released: September 2, 1996
- Recorded: 1996
- Studio: The Glue Factory (San Francisco)
- Genre: Instrumental hip hop; plunderphonics
- Length: 4:57 (LP version); 5:02 (radio version)
- Label: Mo' Wax; FFRR
- Songwriter(s): Josh Davis; Baraka; Pekka Pohjola
- Producer(s): DJ Shadow

DJ Shadow singles chronology
"Hardcore (Instrumental) Hip Hop" / "Fully Charged on Planet X" (1996)	"Midnight in a Perfect World" (1996)	"Stem" (1996)

"Midnight in a Perfect World" is a song by American DJ and music producer DJ Shadow. It was released as the lead single from his debut studio album, Endtroducing....., on September 2, 1996. The song peaked at number 52 on the Scottish Singles Chart and number 54 on the UK Singles Chart.

== Composition ==
Featuring a soulful vocal line and a slow drum beat, "Midnight in a Perfect World" is based around mournful piano sampled from the 1969 song "The Human Abstract" by David Axelrod. Aside from the Axelrod sample, the track also samples "Sower of Seeds" by Baraka, "The Madness Subsides" by Pekka Pohjola, "Releasing Hypnotical Gases" by Organized Konfusion, "Dolmen Music" by Meredith Monk, and "California Soul" by Marlena Shaw.

== Release ==
"Midnight in a Perfect World" was released as both a 12-inch single and CD single on September 2, 1996 in England, and later in America too. In January 1997, the song was released to American college and modern rock radio stations.

Both releases have different artwork, with the American release featuring a photo of John Hillyard, who owned a record store where DJ Shadow found many of the records he sampled on his album. The photograph was taken by B Plus, who also directed a music video for the song that was also released and gained much airplay on the MTV program Amp.

== Track listing ==
=== UK release ===
- Mo' Wax — MW057 — 12" and CD release

Side A
No.	Title	Length
1.	"Midnight in a Perfect World" (Radio Vision)	5:02
2.	"Midnight in a Perfect World" (Gab Mix)	5:21

Side B
No.	Title	Length
1.	"Midnight in a Perfect World" (Extended Vision)	9:53
2.	"Mutual Slump"	4:03

=== US release ===
- FFRR / Mo' Wax — 162-531 084 — 12" and CD release

Side A
No.	Title	Length
1.	"Midnight in a Perfect World"	4:57
2.	"The Number Song"	4:40
3.	"Red Bus Needs to Leave"	2:41

Side B
No.	Title	Length
1.	"Midnight in a Perfect World" (Gab Mix)	5:20
2.	"The Number Song" (Cut Chemist Party Mix)	5:09

== Charts ==
Chart (1996)	Peak position
Scotland (OCC)	52
UK Singles (OCC)	54

== Release history ==
Region	Date	Label	Format	Catalogue no.
United Kingdom	September 2, 1996	Mo' Wax	12"; CD	MW057
United States	January 1997	FFRR; Mo' Wax	12"; CD	162-531 084
