= Live! In Tune and On Time =

2004 live album by DJ Shadow

Live! In Tune and on Time

Live album by DJ Shadow
- Released: June 15, 2004
- Recorded: 2002
- Venue: Brixton Academy, London
- Genre: Hip hop
- Label: Geffen
- Producer: DJ Shadow

DJ Shadow chronology
The Private Repress (2003)	Live! In Tune and on Time (2004)	The Outsider (2006)

Professional ratings
Review scores
Source	Rating
Robert Christgau	A−
Entertainment Weekly	B−
Pitchfork Media	8.4/10
The Austin Chronicle	3/5 stars

Live! In Tune and on Time is a live album by American hip hop producer DJ Shadow, released on June 15, 2004, by DJ Shadow. Recorded in 2002 at Brixton Academy in London, it features tracks and samples from past albums as well as his work with UNKLE and Quannum. The album was released on double vinyl LP and as a CD/DVD set, and the DVD contains additional tracks and material.

The title refers to DJ Shadow's observation that his live shows "only really got interesting when the songs were not only on time but in tune as well."

== Track listings ==
=== CD ===
1. Intro
2. Fixed Income
3. What Does Your Soul Look Like (Part 2)
4. In/Flux
5. Un Autre Introduction
6. Walkie Talkie
7. Guns Blazing (Drums of Death Part 1)
8. Lonely Soul
9. Lost & Found
10. What Does Your Soul Look Like (Part 3)
11. Mutual Slump
12. Stem/Long Stem
13. Reconstruction Medley
14. Holy Calamity (Bear Witness II)
15. The Third Decade, Our Move
16. Halfway Home
17. The Number Song
18. Organ Donor
19. Mashin' on the Motorway
20. Blood on the Motorway
21. Napalm Brain/Scatter Brain & Outro

=== DVD ===
- Intro
- Act I
  - Fixed Income
  - What Does Your Soul Look Like (Part 2)
  - In/Flux
  - Un Autre Introduction
  - Walkie Talkie
- Act 2
  - Guns Blazing (Drums of Death Part 1)
  - Lonely Soul
  - Lost & Found
  - What Does Your Soul Look Like (Part 3)
  - Mutual Slump
  - Stem/Long Stem
- Act 3
  - Reconstruction Medley
  - Holy Calamity (Bear Witness II)
  - The Third Decade, Our Move
  - Halfway Home
  - The Number Song
  - Organ Donor
- Intermission
- Act 4
  - Six Days
  - Mashin' on the Motorway
  - Blood on the Motorway
- Act 5
  - Napalm Brain/Scatter Brain & Outro
- Encore
  - You Can't Go Home Again
  - Midnight in a Perfect World
  - High Noon
- Special Features
  - Malcolm on Drums
  - Pushin' Buttons

== See also ==
- Harmonic mixing
- Beatmatching
