= Our Pathetic Age =

2019 album by DJ Shadow

Studio album by DJ Shadow
- Released: November 15, 2019
- Length: 81:37
- Label: Mass Appeal
- Producer: DJ Shadow

DJ Shadow chronology
The Mountain Will Fall (2016)	Our Pathetic Age (2019)	Action Adventure (2023)

Singles from Our Pathetic Age
- 1. "Rocket Fuel" Released: July 24, 2019; 2. "Rosie" Released: September 20, 2019; 3. "Urgent, Important, Please Read" Released: October 8, 2019

Our Pathetic Age is the sixth studio album by American music producer DJ Shadow, released through Mass Appeal Records on November 15, 2019. It features the singles "Rocket Fuel" (featuring De La Soul) and "Rosie". It also features collaborations with Run the Jewels, Ghostface Killah, Nas, and Raekwon, among others.

== Background ==
DJ Shadow said that "despite the title, it's a hopeful, vibrant album", elaborating that "People are addicted to, and addled by, distraction; they're angry and confused, and disaffected by their own governmental institutions. There's songs that are inspired by this energy and seek to harness it, to make sense of it. In some cases, there's attempts to salve the wound; in others, the songs merely observe but don't offer solutions."

== Composition ==
The album contains two sections: the first (tracks 1–11) contains instrumental tracks, while the second (tracks 12–26) features songs with guest vocalists.

== Critical reception ==
Professional ratings
Aggregate scores
Source	Rating
AnyDecentMusic?	6.8/10
Metacritic	69/100
Review scores
Source	Rating
AllMusic	3/5 stars
The A.V. Club	B+
Clash	7/10
Exclaim!	8/10
The Irish Times	5/5 stars
NME	3/5 stars
Pitchfork	6.1/10
Q	3/5 stars
Rolling Stone	3.5/5 stars
Slant Magazine	3.5/5 stars

On Metacritic, which assigns a weighted average score out of 100 to reviews from mainstream critics, the album received an average score of 69, based on 13 reviews, indicating "generally favorable reviews".

Thomas Hobbs of Pitchfork wrote, "Shadow deserves credit for spotlighting so many enigmatic underground characters, something he has done throughout his career, but the overabundance of ideas and conflicting styles quickly becomes jarring."

== Track listing ==
Part 1: Instrumental Suite
No.	Title	Length
1.	"Nature Always Wins"	1:20
2.	"Slingblade"	3:58
3.	"Intersectionality"	4:08
4.	"Beauty, Power, Motion, Life, Work, Chaos, Law"	2:06
5.	"Juggernaut"	5:31
6.	"Firestorm"	3:59
7.	"Weightless"	2:55
8.	"Rosie"	4:15
9.	"If I Died Today"	2:24
10.	"My Lonely Room"	5:37
11.	"We Are Always Alone" (omitted from vinyl release)	3:47

Part 2: Vocal Suite
No.	Title	Length
1.	"Drone Warfare" (featuring Nas and Pharoahe Monch)	3:42
2.	"Rain on Snow" (featuring Inspectah Deck, Ghostface Killah and Raekwon)	3:39
3.	"Rocket Fuel" (featuring De La Soul)	3:15
4.	"C.O.N.F.O.R.M." (featuring Gift of Gab, Lateef the Truthspeaker and Infamous Taz)	2:51
5.	"Small Colleges (Stay with Me)" (featuring Wiki and Paul Banks)	3:01
6.	"JoJo's Words" (featuring Stro)	4:04
7.	"Kings & Queens" (featuring Run the Jewels)	3:53
8.	"Taxin'" (featuring Dave East)	1:51
9.	"Dark Side of the Heart" (featuring Fantastic Negrito and Jumbo Is Dr.ama)	3:49
10.	"I Am Not a Robot" (interlude)	1:21
11.	"Urgent, Important, Please Read" (featuring Rockwell Knuckles, Tef Poe and Daemon)	5:34
12.	"Our Pathetic Age" (featuring Samuel T. Herring)	4:37

CD bonus track
No.	Title	Length
13.	"Systematic" (featuring Nas)	3:25
Total length:		85:14

Digital bonus tracks
No.	Title	Length
24.	"Been Use Ta" (featuring Pusha T)	2:24
25.	"Taxin'" (featuring Dave East and Loyle Carner; long version)	3:47
26.	"Two Notes" (featuring Barny Fletcher)	3:39
Total length:		91:27

== Charts ==
Chart (2019–2020)	Peak position
Belgian Albums (Ultratop Flanders)	143
Scottish Albums (Official Charts)	25
UK Albums (Official Charts)	53
US Top Album Sales (Billboard)	44
US Indie Store Album Sales (Billboard)	10
