= Stem (DJ Shadow song) =

Single by DJ Shadow

from the album Endtroducing.....
- Released: October 28, 1996
- Recorded: 1996
- Studio: The Glue Factory (San Francisco)
- Genre: "Stem": Trip hop; breakbeat; illbient; "Long Stem": Ambient; plunderphonics; spoken word
- Length: 3:24 ("Stem"); 4:26 ("Long Stem")
- Label: Mo' Wax
- Songwriters: Patrick Campbell-Lyons; Josh Davis; Alex Spyropoulos
- Producer: DJ Shadow

DJ Shadow singles chronology
"Midnight in a Perfect World" (1996)	"Stem" (1996)	"The Number Song" / "Painkiller" (1998)

"Stem" is a song by American DJ and record producer DJ Shadow from his 1996 debut studio album, Endtroducing...... The song reached number 74 on the UK Singles Chart and number 14 on the Irish Singles Chart, making it his only entry in Ireland.

The album version of the song combines "Stem" with "Long Stem".

== Track listing ==
1. "Stem" – 3:24
2. "Long Stem" – 4:26
3. "Red Bus Needs to Leave!" – 2:41
4. "Soup" – 0:43

7-inch single

1. "Stem (Cops 'N' Robbers) - 3:38
2. "Red Bus Needs to Leave!" - 2:41

The version of 'Stem' on the 7" version contains dialogue samples from the Michael Mann film 'Heat' (1995).

== Charts ==
Weekly chart performance for "Stem"
Chart (1996–1997)	Peak position
Ireland (IRMA)	14
UK Singles (OCC)	74
