= Brian D. Farrell =

American entomologist

- Born: Vermont
- Spouse: Irina Ferreras
- Children: 2

Academic background
- Education: BA., University of Vermont; MS., PhD, University of Maryland

Academic work
- Institutions: University of Colorado Boulder; Harvard University
- Main interests: Interaction between insects and plants, specifically the interplay of adaptation and historical contingency in ecological and taxonomic diversification.

Brian Dorsey Farrell is a professor of biology and curator in entomology at Harvard University's Museum of Comparative Zoology. As of 2014, Farrell is also Director of the David Rockefeller Center for Latin American Studies at Harvard University.

== Early life and education ==
Farrell was one of eight children born to a United States born mother and Lebanese-descendent father. He earned his BA in zoology and botany from the University of Vermont and his M.S. and Ph.D. from the University of Maryland.

== Career ==
Farrell accepted a position at the University of Colorado Boulder, where he had his first child. In 1995, he returned to the East Coast to accept a position at Harvard University as a Professor in the Department of Organismic and Evolutionary Biology. In 2014, Farrell was named Director of the David Rockefeller Center for Latin American Studies at Harvard University. He also received a grant to study insect fossils in the Museum of Comparative Zoology at Harvard. In 2018, he was named Faculty Dean of Leverett House.

== Personal life ==
Farrell and his wife Irina Ferreras have two children, who also enrolled in Harvard.
