= Endtroducing..... =

1996 studio album by DJ Shadow

Studio album by DJ Shadow
- Released: September 16, 1996
- Recorded: 1994–1996
- Studio: The Glue Factory (San Francisco)
- Genres: Instrumental hip hop; trip hop; plunderphonics; sampledelia
- Length: 63:23
- Label: Mo' Wax
- Producer: DJ Shadow

DJ Shadow chronology
Endtroducing..... (1996)	Preemptive Strike (1998)

Singles from Endtroducing.....
- 1. "Midnight in a Perfect World" Released: September 2, 1996; 2. "Stem" Released: October 28, 1996; 3. "What Does Your Soul Look Like (Part 1)" Released: January 12, 1998; 4. "The Number Song" / "Painkiller" Released: February 23, 1998

Endtroducing..... is the debut studio album by American music producer DJ Shadow, released on September 16, 1996, by Mo' Wax. It is an instrumental hip hop work composed almost entirely of samples from vinyl records. DJ Shadow produced Endtroducing over two years, using an Akai MPC60 MKII sampler and little other equipment. He edited and layered samples to create new tracks of varying moods and tempos.

In the United Kingdom, where DJ Shadow had already established himself as a rising act, Endtroducing received praise from music journalists at the time of its release, and reached the top 20 of the UK Albums Chart. It was certified gold by the British Phonographic Industry. Mo' Wax issued four singles from the album, including the chart hits "Midnight in a Perfect World" and "Stem". It took considerably longer for Endtroducing to find success in the United States. After promoting the album and returning to his hometown of Davis, California, DJ Shadow devoted his time to creating new music. During this period, interest in Endtroducing began to build among the American music press, and it peaked at number 37 on the US Billboard Heatseekers Albums chart.

Endtroducing was ranked highly on various lists of the best albums of 1996, and has been acclaimed by critics as one of the greatest albums of the 1990s. It is considered a landmark recording in instrumental hip hop, with DJ Shadow's sampling techniques and arrangements leaving a lasting influence. In 2020, Rolling Stone magazine ranked Endtroducing 329th on its list of the 500 greatest albums of all time.

== Background ==
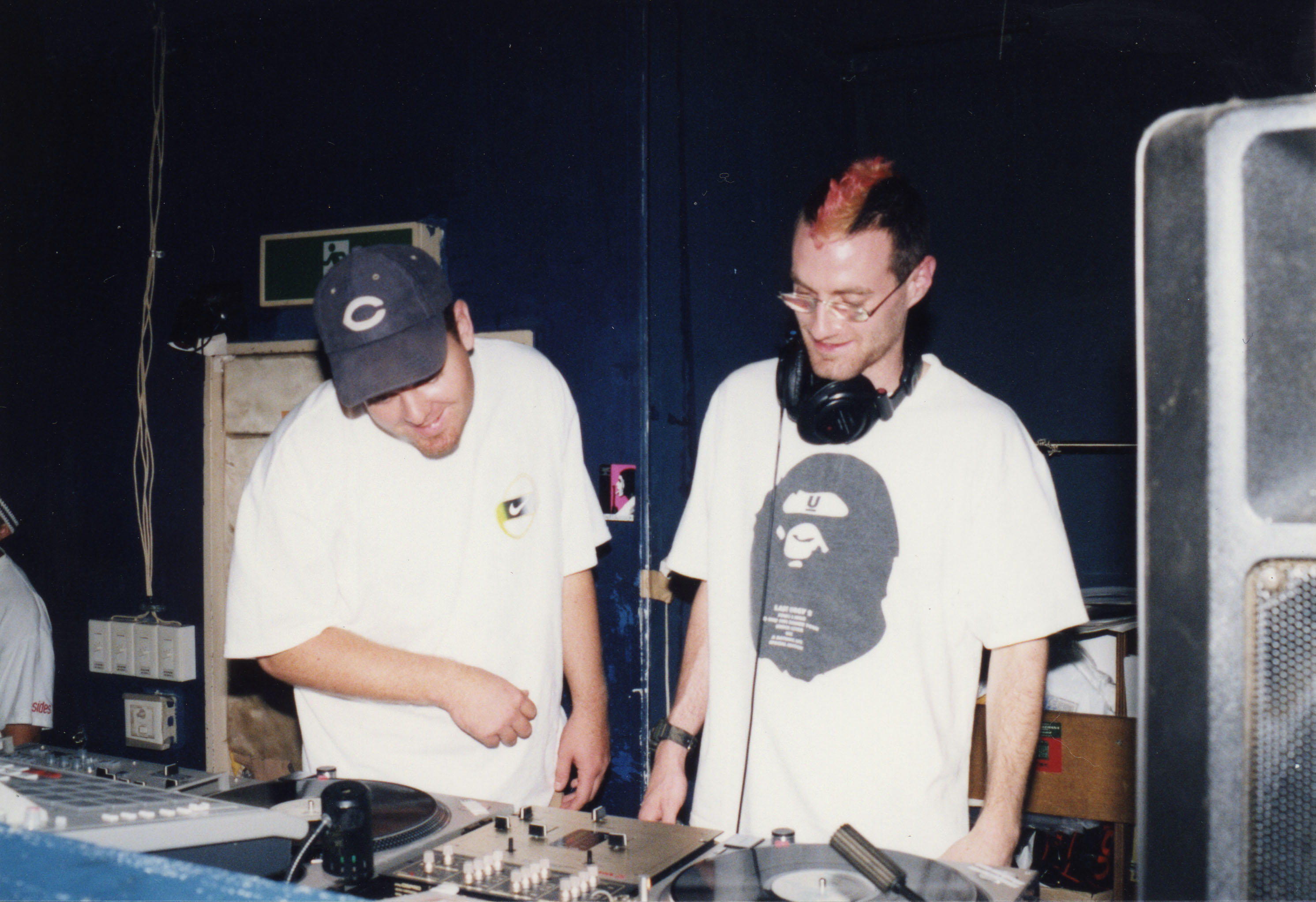
DJ Shadow (left) with Mo' Wax label head James Lavelle in 1997

As a high school student, DJ Shadow experimented with creating music from samples using a four-track recorder, inspired by sample-based music such as It Takes a Nation of Millions to Hold Us Back (1988) by the hip hop group Public Enemy. He began his music career in 1989 as a disc jockey for the University of California, Davis campus radio station KDVS. His KDVS work impressed A&R representative Dave "Funken" Klein, who signed him to the Hollywood Basic label to produce music and remixes. DJ Shadow's output for Hollywood Basic, including the 1993 single "Entropy" and his work with the SoleSides crew, brought him to the attention of English musician James Lavelle, who signed DJ Shadow to his Mo' Wax label.

DJ Shadow's first two singles for Mo' Wax, "In/Flux" (1993) and "Lost and Found (S.F.L.)" (1994), utilized samples from "used-bin" vinyl records, blending elements of hip hop, funk, soul, jazz, rock, and ambient music. The singles were acclaimed by the British music press, and soon DJ Shadow and other Mo' Wax artists came to be viewed as leading practitioners of a nascent genre that the press termed "trip hop" – a name coined by Mixmag journalist Andy Pemberton in June 1994 to describe "In/Flux" and similar tracks being played in London clubs. In the summer of 1994, DJ Shadow started producing his first album. He completed around half of the record, but Mo' Wax opted to instead issue the finished music as a single – "What Does Your Soul Look Like" – the following year. As a result, DJ Shadow began work on his debut album anew. He was intent on capturing the same feel of his three Mo' Wax singles, and chose the title Endtroducing..... for the album as "it signified the fourth and final chapter in a series of pieces that I was doing for Mo' Wax with a certain sound, a certain tone, a certain atmosphere."

== Production ==
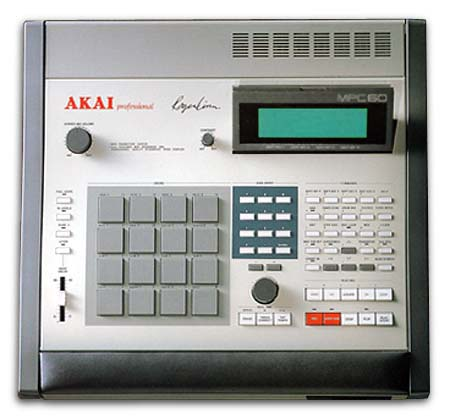
The Akai MPC was used heavily in the production of Endtroducing.

DJ Shadow began production on Endtroducing in 1994 in his California apartment, before moving to the Glue Factory, the San Francisco home studio of his colleague Dan the Automator. Shadow strove to create an entirely sample-based album. His setup was minimal, with only three main pieces of equipment: an Akai MPC60 MKII sampler, a Technics SL-1200 turntable and an Alesis ADAT tape recorder. He used the MPC60 MKII for almost all composition. DJ Shadow bought it in 1992 at the suggestion of DJ Stretch Armstrong, who recommended it as a more advanced alternative to the "industry standard" sampler at the time, the E-mu SP-1200; according to DJ Shadow, the SP-1200 "had been around for like four years, the sound was well established, and it had some real audio limitations in terms of the bit rate and stuff".

DJ Shadow sampled vinyl albums and singles accumulated from his trips to Rare Records, a record shop in his native Sacramento, where he spent several hours each day searching for music. His routine is depicted in the 2001 documentary film Scratch. The Endtroducing album cover is a photograph taken at Rare Records by B Plus, showing producer Chief Xcel and rapper Lyrics Born (the latter wearing a wig), who like DJ Shadow were members of the SoleSides collective. ABB Records founder Beni B (wearing a baseball cap) is also seen in the full version of the photograph, which appears in the album's liner notes.

Endtroducing samples music of various genres, including jazz, funk, and psychedelia, as well as films and interviews. DJ Shadow programmed, chopped, and layered samples to create tracks. He opted to sample more obscure selections, making it a rule to avoid sampling popular material. Though he also used samples of prominent artists such as Björk and Metallica, DJ Shadow said that "if I use something obvious, it's usually only to break my own rules." Minor vocal contributions were provided by Lyrics Born and another SoleSides member, rapper Gift of Gab, as well as DJ Shadow's then-girlfriend Lisa Haugen. He finished recording Endtroducing in early 1996.

== Composition ==
"Midnight in a Perfect World"
The low-tempo track "Midnight in a Perfect World" establishes a nocturnal mood through its diverse array of samples.

DJ Shadow describes his albums as "really varied", and said of Endtroducing: "I feel like 'Organ Donor' sounds nothing like 'The Number Song' which sounds nothing like 'Midnight' and on and on." He said he was often depressed during the production of the album and that his "feelings of self-doubt and self-esteem come through in the music."

Endtroducing is opened by "Best Foot Forward", a sound collage of record scratches and hip hop vocal samples. "Building Steam with a Grain of Salt" is built around a looped piano line sampled from Jeremy Storch's "I Feel a New Shadow", with various other musical elements entering throughout the track, including samples of an interview with drummer George Marsh, a women's choir, bass fills, electronically altered drum kicks, and funk guitar. "The Number Song" uses multiple drum breaks and vocal samples of count-offs. "Changeling" deviates from the previous uptempo tracks, incorporating new-age sounds and gradually building toward a "sublimely spacey" coda. It segues into the first of three "transmission" interludes placed throughout the album, each featuring a sample from the 1987 John Carpenter film Prince of Darkness. "What Does Your Soul Look Like (Part 4)" layers wordless chants over a looped bass groove, creating what Paste's Mark Richardson describes as an "uneasy" techno soundscape. Track six is an untitled interlude featuring a man reciting a monologue about a woman and her sisters over a funk backing.

The two-part "Stem/Long Stem" begins the second half of Endtroducing. John Bush of AllMusic called the track a "suite of often melancholy music, a piece that consistently refuses to be pigeonholed into any musical style." The first half, "Stem", sets strings against a recurring sequence of erratic drum beats, before giving way to the more ethereal "Long Stem", followed by "Transmission 2". "Mutual Slump" features "dreamy" female spoken vocals and prominent samples of Björk's "Possibly Maybe". The sparse "Organ Donor" juxtaposes an organ solo and a drum break. "Why Hip Hop Sucks in '96" is a brief interlude featuring a repeating G-funk-esque beat, over which a voice shouts "It's the money". DJ Shadow composed the track to express his dissatisfaction with the state of commercial hip hop music in the mid-1990s.

"Midnight in a Perfect World" mixes a soulful vocal line with a slow drum beat. It samples the bassline from Pekka Pohjola's "The Madness Subsides", as well as elements of David Axelrod's piano composition "The Human Abstract". "Napalm Brain/Scatter Brain" progresses slowly, starting with a bassline and a drum loop, then gradually increasing in tempo as additional instrumentation enters the mix. The track eventually reaches its climax and deconstructs itself, leaving a single string sample playing by its conclusion. Endtroducing ends "on an up note" with "What Does Your Soul Look Like (Part 1 – Blue Sky Revisit)", which is anchored by warm saxophone and keyboard hooks. A third and final "transmission" closes the album with the spoken words "It is happening again", sampled from the David Lynch television series Twin Peaks.

Songs like "Midnight In A Perfect World", & "Napalm Brain/Scatter Brain" would later appear on DJ Shadow's other release Camel Bobsled Race. While "The Number Song" & "Organ Donor" would also later appear again in DJ Shadow's other release Brainfreeze.

== Release ==
Endtroducing was released by Mo' Wax on September 16, 1996, in the United Kingdom. In the United States, it was issued by Mo' Wax and FFRR Records on November 19, 1996. DJ Shadow promoted the album through various interviews and press appearances. The record spent three weeks on the UK Albums Chart, peaking at number 17, and was certified gold by the British Phonographic Industry in 1998. It also charted at number 75 in the Netherlands. "Midnight in a Perfect World" was previously issued as the album's first single on September 2, 1996, and it was later released to American college and modern rock radio stations in January 1997. It peaked at number 54 on the UK Singles Chart, while its music video, directed by B Plus, received much airplay on MTV's electronic music program Amp. "Stem" was released as the album's second single on October 28, 1996, reaching number 74 in the UK and number 14 in Ireland. "What Does Your Soul Look Like (Part 1)" followed on January 12, 1998, charting at number 54 in the UK. A fourth and final single – a double A-side release featuring producer Cut Chemist's remix of "The Number Song" and DJ Shadow's remix of the synth-pop band Depeche Mode's "Painkiller" – was issued on February 23, 1998.

Describing the time spent promoting Endtroducing as "some weird rollercoaster ride", DJ Shadow was dismayed by the lack of reaction upon returning to his hometown of Davis, compared to the attention he had received within the British music scene. He felt he had been manipulated by the press and his record label and "went from being angry to being depressed" over the perceived lack of control he had over his life. DJ Shadow found himself compelled to produce new tracks such as "High Noon" as outlets for expressing his turbulent feelings at the time. Following this period, interest in his work grew in the US; newspapers ran stories on Endtroducing and DJ Shadow received several phone calls a day, enough to convince him to hire a manager. Endtroducing eventually entered the Billboard Heatseekers Albums chart and peaked at number 37 on the listing in April 1997.

== Critical reception ==
Professional ratings
Review scores
Source	Rating
AllMusic	5/5 stars
Alternative Press	5/5
Christgau's Consumer Guide	A+
Entertainment Weekly	A−
The Guardian	5/5 stars
NME	8/10
Pitchfork	10/10
Rolling Stone	4/5 stars
The Rolling Stone Album Guide	5/5 stars
Spin	9/10

Endtroducing received critical acclaim. Alternative Press praised the album as "an undeniable hip-hop masterpiece" showing "DJ Shadow remembers that sampling is an art form", while Q reviewer Martin Aston described it as "a cinematically broad spectrum so deftly layered that the sampling-is-stealing argument falls flat". David Bennun from The Guardian said the record was "not only one of the most daring and original albums of recent times, but also one of the loveliest", and in Melody Maker, he wrote: "I am, I confess, totally confounded by it. I hear a lot of good records, but very few impossible ones... You need this record. You are incomplete without it." Robert Christgau commented in Playboy that Endtroducing consists of "not so much songs as compositions", and also claimed that while listeners unfamiliar with the album's style of music would not find its tracks as powerful, "they are so rich and eclectic, and spun out with such a sense of flow, that this album establishes the kind of convincing aural reality other British techno experimenters only fantasize about." Author and rock critic Greil Marcus penned a glowing review of the album in Artforum, where he called it "absolutely modern – which is to say ambient-dreamy and techno-abstract" and "quite brilliant throughout".

Entertainment Weekly critic Jon Wiederhorn likened Endtroducing to "a surreal film soundtrack on which jazz, classical, and jungle fragments are artfully blended with turntable tricks and dialogue snippets" and said that it "takes hip-hop into the next dimension." Tony Green of JazzTimes commended DJ Shadow's "unerring ear for motif and texture", and Simon Williams of NME called him "both slyly knowing and brilliantly naive, fusing the dramatic and the deranged to his own sweet end." Spin's Sia Michel said that the album "practically folds you into its symphonic fantasia, the coming-of-age story of a 24-year-old bunk-bed dreamer." Rolling Stone journalist Jason Fine found that while Endtroducing occasionally lapses into less interesting "moody atmospherics", "even in the record's mellowest moments, Shadow's allegiance to the hard beats of hip-hop saves him".

Endtroducing appeared in numerous publications' lists of the best albums of 1996. The album topped year-end lists by Muzik and OOR, and placed second in Melody Maker's. It was voted fourth place in The Village Voice's Pazz & Jop critics' poll for 1996. Robert Christgau, the poll's creator, named Endtroducing the best album of the year. The album also ranked in the top ten of year-end lists by The Face, the Los Angeles Times, Mojo, NME, and Vox.

== Legacy ==
Endtroducing has appeared in critics' lists of the greatest albums. Publications such as Pitchfork, Q, Rolling Stone, Slant Magazine, and Spin have placed it on their lists of best albums of the 1990s. Robert Christgau named it among his 10 favorite albums from the decade. NPR listed Endtroducing as one of the 300 most important American records of the 20th century, and Time selected the record as one of the "All-Time 100 Albums" in 2006. It was also included in the book 1001 Albums You Must Hear Before You Die. In 2020, Rolling Stone ranked Endtroducing number 329 on its list of the 500 greatest albums of all time.

Guinness World Records cited Endtroducing as the first album created entirely from samples. AllMusic editor Stephen Thomas Erlewine called it "not only a major breakthrough for hip-hop and electronica, but for pop music." It was a driving force in the development of instrumental hip hop music, inspiring numerous DJs and producers to create sample-based works. Tim Stelloh of PopMatters cited it as the "benchmark" for the genre. Will Hermes called Endtroducing "trip-hop's crowning achievement" in Spin, and Jeff Weiss of the Los Angeles Times wrote that it defined American trip hop. Music journalist Trey Zenker described it as a "plunderphonics masterpiece" in an essay for Tidal, while Turk Dietrich of the American experimental music duo Belong said that it was a nearly unrivaled masterwork of sampledelia. Endtroducing inspired the British rock band Radiohead to edit and loop drums on their 1997 album OK Computer. Several artists sampled on Endtroducing, including David Axelrod and British rock band Nirvana, praised the album. DJ Shadow expressed surprise at the album's stature: "After the record, I'd always bump into these world-class producers who'd say, 'Yeah, Endtroducing – what a great piece of production.' I just did it on one sampler in a tiny little studio."

Andy Battaglia of The A.V. Club suggested that the influence of Endtroducing may have had a negative effect on the album itself, saying that it "has been partially diluted by the symphonic beat-collage culture it helped spawn." The acclaim set high expectations for future releases by DJ Shadow, and he expressed his dissatisfaction with being expected to "repeat Endtroducing over and over again". Nonetheless, DJ Shadow clarified that he views the album in a positive light: "People always seem to suggest that there's this pressure, and that Endtroducing is some kind of albatross, and I've just honestly never felt that way. I think that I have a healthy enough respect for the lineage of the music and how rare it is that you can connect with an audience. If that will always be 'the record' then so be it, that's cool." By April 26, 2005, Endtroducing had sold more than 290,000 copies in the US alone.

DJ Shadow is scheduled to embark on a tour in support of the album's 30th anniversary in 2026.

=== Reissues ===
A deluxe edition of Endtroducing was released on June 6, 2005. It includes a second disc, Excessive Ephemera, comprising alternate takes, demos, B-sides, remixes, and a live track, as well as new sleeve photographs and notes about the making of the album. A second deluxe edition commemorating the album's 20th anniversary, the Endtrospective edition, was released on October 28, 2016, featuring Excessive Ephemera, the remix album Endtroducing... Re-Emagined, and additional sleeve photographs and notes. A 25th-anniversary reissue was released on September 24, 2021. The reissue was remastered at half speed at Abbey Road Studios from DJ Shadow's original DAT recording.

== Track listing ==
Endtroducing..... track listing
No.	Title	Writer(s)	Length
1.	"Best Foot Forward"	Josh Davis	0:49
2.	"Building Steam with a Grain of Salt"	Davis; Jeremy Storch	6:40
3.	"The Number Song"	Davis	4:40
4.	"Changeling" / "Transmission 1"	Davis; Peter Baumann; Christopher Franke; Edgar Froese	7:51
5.	"What Does Your Soul Look Like (Part 4)"	Davis; Ray Smith	5:08
6.	Untitled	Davis	0:24
7.	"Stem/Long Stem" / "Transmission 2"	Davis; Patrick Campbell-Lyons; Alex Spyropoulos	9:21
8.	"Mutual Slump"	Davis; Björk Guðmundsdóttir; Marius de Vries; Paul Hooper	4:02
9.	"Organ Donor"	Davis	1:57
10.	"Why Hip Hop Sucks in '96"	Davis	0:43
11.	"Midnight in a Perfect World"	Davis; Baraka; Pekka Pohjola	4:57
12.	"Napalm Brain/Scatter Brain"	Davis	9:23
13.	"What Does Your Soul Look Like (Part 1 – Blue Sky Revisit)" / "Transmission 3"	Davis; Jimmy Heath; Shawn Phillips	7:28
Total length:			63:23

Samples credited in liner notes

- "Building Steam with a Grain of Salt" contains samples of "I Feel a New Shadow", written and performed by Jeremy Storch.
- "The Number Song" contains samples of "Orion", performed by Metallica.
- "Changeling" / "Transmission 1" contains samples of "Invisible Limits", written by Peter Baumann, Christopher Franke, and Edgar Froese and performed by Tangerine Dream.
- "What Does Your Soul Look Like (Part 4)" contains samples of "The Vision", written by Ray Smith and performed by Flying Island.
- "Stem/Long Stem" / "Transmission 2" contains samples of "Love Suite", written by Patrick Campbell-Lyons and Alex Spyropoulos and performed by Nirvana.
- "Mutual Slump" contains samples of "Possibly Maybe", written by Björk Guðmundsdóttir, Marius de Vries, and Paul Hooper and performed by Björk.
- "Midnight in a Perfect World" contains samples of "Sower of Seeds", written and performed by Baraka; and "The Madness Subsides", written and performed by Pekka Pohjola.
- "What Does Your Soul Look Like (Part 1 – Blue Sky Revisit)" / "Transmission 3" contains samples of "The Voice of the Saxophone", written by Jimmy Heath and performed by the Heath Brothers; and "All Our Love", written and performed by Shawn Phillips.

== Personnel ==
Credits are adapted from the album's liner notes.

Production

- DJ Shadow – production, engineering, mixing
- Dan the Automator – engineering (assistant)

Design

- B Plus – photography
- Barney Bankhead – photography
- Will Bankhead – photography, sleeve design
- Ben Drury – sleeve design

== Charts ==
Weekly chart performance for Endtroducing.....
Chart (1996–2019)	Peak position
Belgian Mid Price Albums (Ultratop Flanders)	29
Dutch Albums (Album Top 100)	75
European Top 100 Albums (Music & Media)	54
Scottish Albums (Official Charts)	27
UK Albums (Official Charts)	17
UK Dance Albums (OCC)	1
UK Independent Albums (OCC)	3
UK R&B Albums (Official Charts)	6
US Heatseekers Albums (Billboard)	37

== Certifications ==
Certifications for Endtroducing.....
Region	Certification	Certified units/sales
Canada (Music Canada)	Gold	50,000^{^}
United Kingdom (BPI)	Platinum	300,000^{‡}
^{^} Shipments figures based on certification alone.^{‡} Sales+streaming figures based on certification alone.

== Bibliography ==
- "100 Best Albums of the '90s". The '90s: The Inside Stories from the Decade That Rocked. Harper Design. 2010. ISBN 978-0-06-177920-6.
- Christgau, Robert (1998). "Art-Rock You Can Dance To: DJ Shadow". Grown Up All Wrong: 75 Great Rock and Pop Artists from Vaudeville to Techno. Harvard University Press. ISBN 0-674-44318-7.
- Christgau, Robert (2000). "DJ Shadow: Endtroducing... DJ Shadow". Christgau's Consumer Guide: Albums of the '90s. St. Martin's Griffin. ISBN 0-312-24560-2.
- Katz, Mark (2012). Groove Music: The Art and Culture of the Hip-Hop DJ. Oxford University Press. ISBN 978-0-19-533111-0.
- Reece, Craig (2006). "DJ Shadow: Endtroducing...". In Dimery, Robert (ed.). 1001 Albums You Must Hear Before You Die. Universe Publishing. ISBN 978-0-7893-1371-3.
- Sheffield, Rob (2004). "DJ Shadow". In Brackett, Nathan; Hoard, Christian (eds.). The New Rolling Stone Album Guide (4th ed.). Simon & Schuster. ISBN 0-7432-0169-8.
- Taylor, Steve (2004). "DJ Shadow". The A to X of Alternative Music. Continuum International Publishing Group. ISBN 0-8264-7396-2.
- Wilder, Eliot (2005). Endtroducing... 33⅓. Bloomsbury Publishing. ISBN 978-0-8264-1682-7.
