= Action Adventure (album) =

Studio album by DJ Shadow
- Released: October 27, 2023
- Length: 57:37
- Label: Mass Appeal
- Producer: DJ Shadow

DJ Shadow chronology
Our Pathetic Age (2019)	Action Adventure (2023)

Singles from Action Adventure
- 1. "Ozone Scraper" Released: August 18, 2023

Action Adventure is the seventh studio album by American music producer Joshua Paul Davis, better known as DJ Shadow. It was released on October 27, 2023, through Mass Appeal.

== Background ==
Davis offered a first insight into his upcoming musical output on August 9, 2023. In an effort to "get personal" and make music for himself again, he no longer saw a use to "give someone else a runway" or make music that was "formatted for vocalists". With this record, the producer challenged himself to "write music that flexed different energies". In preparation for the production, Davis bought 200 tapes recorded off an 1980s-era radio mix on eBay and listened to previously unheard records from his 60,000-strong vinyl record collection.

One of the main questions Davis asked himself throughout the recording process was which chord progression would be "most natural" and "least predictable". The album reflects his "relationship to music" as well as his "life as a collector and curator".

The producer announced the album release on August 18. Unlike its predecessor Our Pathetic Age, which contained a multitude of guest appearances, Action Adventure has no featured artists and is "mostly instrumental". Davis shared the lead single "Ozone Scraper" on August 18, a "peppy, synth-powered" track accompanied by a video filmed in Uzbekistan. Directed by Stefano Ottaviano, the visuals capture a "zen-like feeling". Promotion of the album was set to encompass three performance dates in October 2023.

== Critical reception ==
Professional ratings
Aggregate scores
Source	Rating
Metacritic	67/100
Review scores
Source	Rating
AllMusic	3/5 stars
And It Don't Stop	A−
The Irish Times	3.5/5 stars
Louder Than War	4.5/5 stars
Mojo	3/5 stars
Pitchfork	6.9/10
Record Collector	3/5 stars
Tom Hull – on the Web	B+
Uncut	7/10
Under the Radar	4.5/10

Action Adventure received a score of 67 out of 100 on review aggregator Metacritic based on eight critics' reviews, indicating "generally favorable" reception. Louder Than War named it album of the week and described it as "a great comeback from a great talent who's been in hibernation waiting to release a monstrous set of pure brilliance". AllMusic's Paul Simpson wrote that Action Adventure "doesn't sound like DJ Shadow's other records, but it's exactly the type of album he would make—a risky, expectation-bucking set that only fully makes sense to the artist himself".

The Irish Times' Lauren Murphy found the album to have "an undoubted sense of nostalgia" and called it "a reminder that DJ Shadow still has plenty to offer". Mojo commented that "even when further adrift from the lost funk sampledelia that made his name, Shadow's production brilliance shines through", and Uncut felt that "the album flags a bit in the middle but maintains enough propulsion to easily glide past those saggy moments". Matthew Ismael Ruiz of Pitchfork remarked that "some of the beats [...] feel hollow without a charismatic rapper to float over them" and "much of the album's early runtime builds towards a climax that never comes", although felt that "the drums are captivating enough to save more than one song from sleeping at the wheel".

== Track listing ==
All tracks are arranged by Joshua Davis.

Action Adventure track listing
No.	Title	Writer(s)	Length
1.	"Ozone Scraper"	Joshua Davis; Jouko Sumen	3:31
2.	"All My"	Davis; Loudon Wainwright III	2:43
3.	"Time and Space"	Davis	8:21
4.	"Craig, Ingels, & Wrightson"	Davis	3:09
5.	"Witches vs. Warlocks"	Davis; Georg Herrnstadt; Wilhelm Resetarits	4:10
6.	"A Narrow Escape"	Davis; Sam Spence	2:56
7.	"You Played Me"	Davis; Ron Townsend	3:28
8.	"Free for All"	Davis; Kenny Aaronson	2:30
9.	"The Prophecy"	Davis	4:43
10.	"Friend or Foe"	Davis	2:42
11.	"Fleeting Youth (An Audible Life)"	Davis; Eugene Bowen	3:32
12.	"Reflecting Pool"	Davis	7:54
13.	"Forever Changed"	Davis	3:43
14.	"She's Evolving"	Davis; Carol Grimes; Maciek Hrybowicz	4:15
Total length:			57:37

Sample credits

- "All My" contains a sample of "Expatriot", written and performed by Loudon Wainwright III.
- "Witches vs. Warlocks" contains a sample of "(Wir Sind Die) Schmetterband", written by Georg Herrnstadt, and performed by Schmetterlinge.
- "A Narrow Escape" contains a sample of "The Runner", written and performed by Sam Spence.
- "You Played Me" contains a sample of "Baby Got Me Goin", written by Ron Townsend, and performed by Jan Jerome.
- "Free for All" contains a sample of "Loose Goose", written by Kenny Aaronson, and performed by Dust.
- "Fleeting Youth (An Audible Life)" contains a sample of "Tourmaline", written and performed by Eugene Bowen.
- "She's Evolving" contains a sample of "Work", written by Carol Grimes and Maciek Hrybowicz, and performed by Carol Grimes.

== Personnel ==
- DJ Shadow – production, mixing, programming
- Mikael "Count" Eldridge – mixing
- Mark Bijasa – artwork
- Ron Lesser – cover painting

== Charts ==
Chart performance for Action Adventure
Chart (2023)	Peak position
Scottish Albums (OCC)	32
UK Album Downloads (OCC)	13
UK Dance Albums (OCC)	1
UK Independent Albums (OCC)	14
