= The Outsider (DJ Shadow album) =

2006 studio album by DJ Shadow

Studio album by DJ Shadow
- Released: September 19, 2006
- Length: 70:40
- Label: Universal Motown
- Producer: DJ Shadow

DJ Shadow chronology
Live! In Tune and On Time (2004)	The Outsider (2006)	The Less You Know, the Better (2011)

Singles from The Outsider
- 1. "3 Freaks" Released: 2005; 2. "Enuff" Released: 2006; 3. "This Time (I'm Gonna Try It My Way)" Released: 2006

The Outsider is the third studio album by American hip hop producer DJ Shadow, released by Universal Motown Records on September 19, 2006. It peaked at number 77 on the Billboard 200 chart.

== Critical reception ==
Professional ratings
Aggregate scores
Source	Rating
Metacritic	62/100
Review scores
Source	Rating
AllMusic	3.5/5 stars
Entertainment Weekly	B−
The Guardian	3/5 stars
Mojo	3/5 stars
NME	5/10
Pitchfork	5.8/10
Q	3/5 stars
Rolling Stone	3.5/5 stars
Spin	3/5 stars
Uncut	4/5 stars

At Metacritic, which assigns a weighted average score out of 100 to reviews from mainstream critics, the album received an average score of 62, based on 31 reviews, indicating "generally favorable reviews".

Dave Kerr of The Skinny wrote, "Beyond the varied range of sonic influence on display, this is easily the most lyrically driven Shadow LP to date". John Bush of AllMusic called it "a carefully crafted, artistically elusive mess".

== Track listing ==
U.S. edition CD
No.	Title	Length
1.	"Outsider Intro"	2:19
2.	"This Time (I'm Gonna Try It My Way)"	3:05
3.	"3 Freaks" (featuring Keak da Sneak and Turf Talk)	3:47
4.	"Droop-E Drop"	0:18
5.	"Turf Dancing" (featuring The Federation and Animaniaks)	4:38
6.	"Keep Em Close" (featuring Nump)	3:06
7.	"Seein' Thangs" (featuring David Banner)	3:40
8.	"Broken Levee Blues"	2:07
9.	"Artifact (Instrumental)"	2:57
10.	"Backstage Girl" (featuring Phonte Coleman)	7:22
11.	"Triplicate / Something Happened That Day"	3:44
12.	"The Tiger" (featuring Sergio Pizzorno and Christopher Karloff)	5:23
13.	"Erase You" (featuring Chris James)	6:58
14.	"What Have I Done" (featuring Christina Carter)	5:24
15.	"You Made It" (featuring Chris James)	2:47
16.	"Enuff" (featuring Q-Tip and Lateef the Truth Speaker)	4:28
17.	"Dats My Part" (featuring E-40)	4:03
18.	"3 Freaks (Droop-E Remix)" (featuring Mistah F.A.B., Turf Talk, and Keak da Sneak)	4:32

Japanese edition CD bonus tracks
No.	Title	Length
18.	"Purple Grapes" (featuring The Team)	5:20
19.	"3 Freaks" (music video; featuring Keak da Sneak and Turf Talk)	3:30

U.K. edition CD
No.	Title	Length
1.	"Outsider Intro"	2:19
2.	"This Time (I'm Gonna Try It My Way)"	3:05
3.	"3 Freaks" (featuring Keak da Sneak and Turf Talk)	3:47
4.	"Droop-E Drop"	0:18
5.	"Turf Dancing" (featuring The Federation and Animaniaks)	4:38
6.	"Keep Em Close" (featuring Nump)	3:06
7.	"Seein' Thangs" (featuring David Banner)	3:40
8.	"Broken Levee Blues"	2:07
9.	"Artifact (Instrumental)"	2:57
10.	"Skullfuckery" (featuring The Heliocentrics)	4:53
11.	"Backstage Girl" (featuring Phonte Coleman)	7:22
12.	"Triplicate / Something Happened That Day"	3:44
13.	"The Tiger" (featuring Sergio Pizzorno and Christopher Karloff)	5:23
14.	"Erase You" (featuring Chris James)	6:58
15.	"What Have I Done" (featuring Christina Carter)	5:24
16.	"You Made It" (featuring Chris James)	2:47
17.	"Enuff" (featuring Q-Tip and Lateef the Truth Speaker)	4:28
18.	"Dats My Part" (featuring E-40)	4:03

U.K. limited edition CD
No.	Title	Length
1.	"Outsider Intro"	2:19
2.	"This Time (I'm Gonna Try It My Way)"	3:05
3.	"3 Freaks" (featuring Keak da Sneak and Turf Talk)	3:47
4.	"Droop-E Drop"	0:18
5.	"Turf Dancing" (featuring The Federation and Animaniaks)	4:38
6.	"Keep Em Close" (featuring Nump)	3:06
7.	"Seein' Thangs" (featuring David Banner)	3:40
8.	"Broken Levee Blues"	2:07
9.	"Artifact (Instrumental)"	2:57
10.	"Backstage Girl" (featuring Phonte Coleman)	7:22
11.	"Triplicate / Something Happened That Day"	3:44
12.	"The Tiger" (featuring Sergio Pizzorno and Christopher Karloff)	5:23
13.	"Erase You" (featuring Chris James)	6:58
14.	"What Have I Done" (featuring Christina Carter)	5:24
15.	"Triplicate Part 3"	2:52
16.	"You Made It" (featuring Chris James)	2:47
17.	"Enuff" (featuring Q-Tip and Lateef the Truth Speaker)	4:28
18.	"Dats My Part" (featuring E-40)	4:03

U.K. limited edition DVD: Tour Visuals
No.	Title	Length
1.	"Seein' Thangs" (featuring David Banner)	3:40
2.	"The Tiger" (featuring Sergio Pizzorno and Christopher Karloff)	5:15
3.	"Erase You" (featuring Chris James)	6:52
4.	"Triplicate"	1:52
5.	"Behind the Scenes of the Making of the Video: '3 Freaks'"	8:08

== Personnel ==
Credits adapted from liner notes.

- DJ Shadow – production, arrangement, turntables
- Count – engineering
- Jim Abbiss – engineering
- Paul Insect – art direction, illustration

== Charts ==
=== Weekly charts ===
Chart (2006)	Peak position
Australian Albums (ARIA)	44
Belgian Albums (Ultratop Flanders)	68
French Albums (SNEP)	105
Italian Albums (FIMI)	100
UK Albums (OCC)	24
US Billboard 200	77
US Top Dance Albums (Billboard)	2

=== Year-end charts ===
Chart (2006)	Position
US Top Dance/Electronic Albums (Billboard)	24
