= Dennis The Fox =

American singer-songwriter

Dennis Caldirola (born 1948) – better known to record collectors by the stage-name, Dennis The Fox – is an American singer, songwriter, and keyboardist.

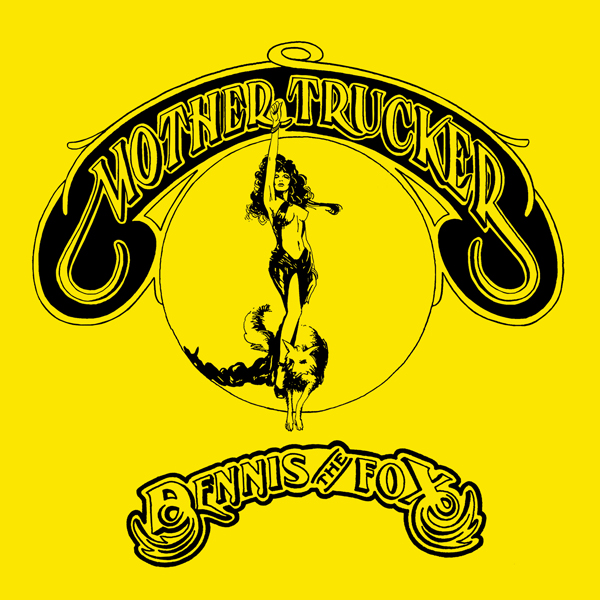
Dennis the Fox "Mothertrucker" LP Musart Records MA801

== Early life and career ==
Born in Miles City, Montana, on March 22, 1948, to a native Italian father (Carlo Caldirola) and an Irish-American mother (Della Floyd). While an infant the Caldirola family moved to Seattle's Italian-dominated neighborhood – “Garlic Gulch” – in the Rainier Valley area just east of Beacon Hill, young Dennis was raised bilingually, and the Caldirolas were warmly welcomed into the community.

Caldirola started learning piano in first grade, and later while in high school in the summer of 1964 he helped form a band, the Rum Runners, that played teen dances around town, and fabled rooms including Parker's Ballroom and the Lake Hills Roller Rink. Their biggest gig was opening up for British rock group, the Yardbirds, at the Eagles Auditorium on July 30, 1967. The group broke up in September 1968 when Caldirola opted to move on from Seattle University and continue his college studies in Florence, Italy. Then, upon his return, Caldirola played the Hammond organ with HUGG, a band that had been around since 1968. He performed with them into 1971 when he committed himself to becoming a genuine rock star and began focusing on writing original material.

== 1971-72: Mothertrucker ==
By 1971 Caldirola was associating with Dave Clark – a local businessman who began serving as his de facto manager. Together they concocted a plan aimed at scoring Caldirola a recording contract and setting him on the path to fame and fortune. The first step was dropping his mouthful-of-a-birth-name, and adopting the stage-name, “Dennis The Fox.” Next, they corralled a bunch of top Seattle musicians including: Robbie Straube (drums) from Merrilee Rush & the Turnabouts; Toby Bowen (guitar) and Bobby Anderson (drums) from Bighorn; Fred Zeufeldt (drums) from the Viceroys, the Surprise Package, and Bighorn; Buddy Stewart (bass) from Bad Manners; and Dave Belzer from both HUGG and in an early iteration of the future superstar band, Heart.

These and additional players all gathered into a shuttered downtown menswear shop (Kalifornia Kreations) that Clark held the lease on. An audio engineer named John A. Peterson set up his gear and they proceeded (late at night after general traffic noise outside died down) to cut a batch of Caldirola's songs – tunes selected to demonstrate the breadth of Caldirola's compositional skills. As he once told Eothen “Egon” Alapatt of the Now-Again record company: “We were trying to get a record deal so we cut all of these tapes, of various songs, in various styles, to show how versatile I could be.” Then in September 1972, Caldirola and Clark headed south to Hollywood and began hustling the tapes around to various record companies. “To our dismay,” the songwriter once recalled, “the record labels found the material ‘too versatile’ for their marketing purposes.”

== 1973-85: The Music Business ==
Caldirola managed to sell the bulk of his Mothertrucker LP stock; He had not managed to become a global rock star, but he had created a music career that lasted well into his thirties. A list of notable highlights from this period would include his time in 1976 playing keyboards with a revived first generation local band, Tiny Tony & the Statics.

Between 1979 and 1981, Caldirola collaborated with Thom Bell, a Philadelphia-based producer who has worked with the Delfonics, Dionne Warwick, and the Stylistics. Bell had recently relocated to Seattle where he began working out of the town’s best studio, Kaye Smith, cutting tracks there with artists including Elton John and the Spinners. Caldirola worked as a Professional Manager with Mighty Three Music – the publishing arm of Philadelphia International Records and Thom Bell Productions – where he assessed new songs, coached songwriters, and steered worthy songs to many nationally recognized artists. Several of Caldirola’s originals also got placed with up-and-coming singers. In 1980, Dee Dee Bridgewater released her version of “When Love Comes Knockin’”, which Caldirola co-wrote with Joe Erickson from the funk band Push – as producer, Bell took a writer's credit. In 1981, Phyllis Hyman recorded their “Just Another Face In The Crowd.”

That same year Jr. Cadillac – the Northwest's premiere roots rock band (as founded in 1970 by members of several first generation rock bands including: the Wailers, Frantics, Sonics, Redcoats, and Mark V) – released a recording of “(The Original) Comeback Girl” co-written by Caldirola with the band's leader, Ned Neltner. In 1981 Caldirola also moved back to Italy where he assembled a rockabilly band, Dennis & the Jets, who became very popular up through 1984 when he returned to Seattle.

Caldirola held entertainment industry roles including: working as: a booking agent with Far West Entertainment; an assistant cruise director on board ships for the Princess Cruise line (1981–1983); deputy cruise director for Sundance Cruises (1985–1986). Caldirola also launched a new career as a popular auctioneer-for-hire, and simultaneously took on the ongoing role as Executive Director of Seattle's annual Festa Italiana, the Italian festival at Seattle Center.

== 2004–17: Mothertrucker (A Slight Return) ==
In 2004 someone sent Caldirola a copy of WaxPoetics magazine (issue No. 8) which featured an essay by funk music expert Dante Carfagna titled “Left-Field Americana: Private Press LPs” that included coverage of Mothertrucker. The critic reflected that it was “as if most of the music came from different sources and they need to tie it all down with a single vocalist.”

The album was then reviewed by The Stranger. Patrick “The Lama” Lundborg, author of the Acid Archives book from 2006 described Mothertrucker as being a “Priceless loungerock extravaganza like if Jade Stone & Luv had John Ylvisaker on vocals.” In 2013, Eothen “Egon” Alapatt commented in an interview about Caldirola: “This guy really had it all and is one of the nicest, most normal guys you’ll ever meet. He just happened to make an album that sounds as if some seedy weirdo Northwestern biker dreg made it on his way to the pen.”

Paul Major said: “Utterly dark and sleazy lowlife nirvana!... If any LP in my own stash turns the end-of-the-night losers into big heroes ... this one does. ... I still figure I'll wake up tomorrow and find out it was one of my own deluded dreams, nobody could nail the vibe in the waking world.”

== Compilations and samples ==
In 2001 “Piledriver” appeared on Yee-Haw! The Other Side of Country (Q.D. K. Media CD 039). In 2008 “Flight of the Phoenix” appeared on Keep On Struttin...’ – A Tribute To The Meters (Le Smoke Disque B001KYQSBA). In 2012 “Piledriver” appeared on Country Funk: 1969–1975 (Light In The Attic Records LITA 083) as it did in 2013 on Enjoy The Experience – Homemade Records 1958–1992 (Sinecure Books / Now-Again Records NA-5100-CD).

== Discography ==
As leader:

- Mothertrucker (1972) (MusArt MA 801 (stereo LP))
- Mothertrucker (2007) (MusArt MA 801 (stereo CD))
- Mothertrucker (2017) (Modern Harmonic MH-8025 (stereo LP))

As composer:

- Dee Dee Bridgewater, Dee Dee Bridgewater (1980) (Elektra Records 6E-306) featuring “When Love Comes Knockin’” co-written with Joe Erickson and Thom Bell
- Can’t We Fall In Love Again, Phyllis Hyman (1981) (Arista Records AL9544) featuring “Just Another Face In The Crowd” (lyrics: Caldirola / music: Joe Erickson)
- In For Life Jr. Cadillac (1981) (Great Northwest Record Company GNWR 006) featuring “(The Original) Comeback Girl” co-written with Ned Neltner
- Dennis & the Jets, 1984, (1984) private compact disc
- Yee-Haw! The Other Side of Country (2001) (Q.D. K. Media CD 039) - compilation featuring: “Piledriver”
- Funky Skunk, D.J. Shadow (2006) (DJ Shadow/Obey Reconstruction B000BRONYQ) featuring a sample from “Piledriver.”
- Legends, Malcolm Forest (2007) (Prestige Elite B001NCSIFI) featuring “Just Another Face In The Crowd.”
- Keep On Struttin...’ – A Tribute To The Meters (2008) (Le Smoke Disque B001KYQSBA) - compilation featuring: “Flight of the Phoenix”
- Only The Best of Dee Dee Bridgewater, Dee Dee Bridgewater (2009) (Collectables Records Col 1116) featuring “When Love Comes Knockin’” co-written with Dave Erickson and Thom Bell
- Gangrene, The Alchemist + Oh No (2010) (Decon Records DCN 101) featuring a sample from “Bazooka” on “Take Drugs”
- Enjoy The Experience – Homemade Records 1958–1992 (2013) (Sinecure Books / Now-Again Records NA-5100-CD) - compilation featuring: “Piledriver”
- Country Funk: 1969–1975 (2012) (Light In The Attic Records LITA 083) compilation featuring: “Piledriver”
