= Greg Edmonson =

US music composer

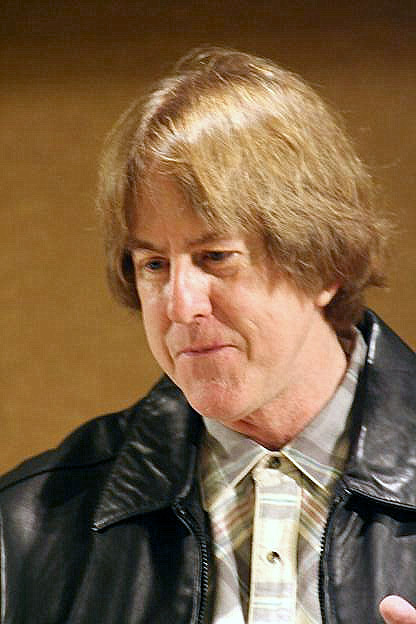
- Edmonson in December 2005

Greg Edmonson is an American music composer for television and movies. He is primarily known for composing the soundtrack to the television series Firefly. He is also the composer for the first three games in the Uncharted video game series, and for a number of episodes of the American animated sitcom King of the Hill.

== Biography ==
Edmonson grew up in Dallas, Texas and played the guitar as a youth. He studied jazz composition at the University of North Texas College of Music. Later, while he was a studio musician and session player, he attended the Musicians Institute of Technology. He has studied with Dr. Albert Harris.

As a protégé of Mike Post, Edmonson worked on a number of series providing additional scoring (credited and sometimes not credited).

His compositions are usually written on the piano but he sometimes uses a guitar.

== Discography ==
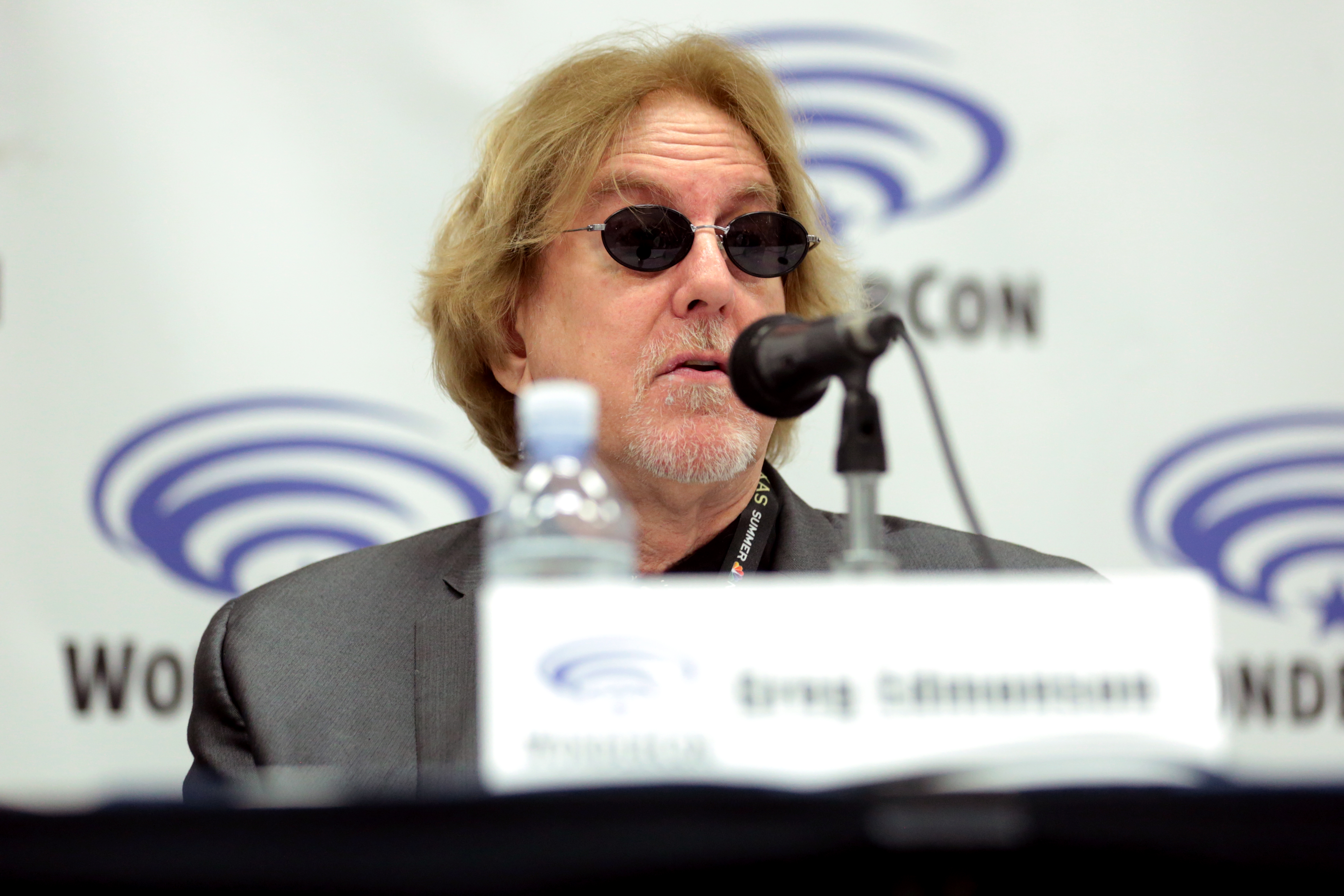
Edmonson speaking at WonderCon in 2017

=== Film ===
- Turn of the Blade (1994)
- Science Fiction: A Journey Into the Unknown (1994)
- Last Lives (1997)
- Martian Law (1998)
- Frog and Wombat (1998)
- Undercover Angel (1999)
- Blue Ridge Fall (1999)
- Gary the Rat (2000)
- Luckytown (2000)
- Fast Women (2001)
- Miss Castaway and the Island Girls (2004)
- Sweet Union (2004)
- My First Christmas Tree (2007)
- Skyrunners (2009)
- Montana Amazon (2011)
- Bounty Killer (2013)

=== Television ===
- Cop Rock (1990)
- Masters of the Maze (1994–1995)
- King of the Hill (1997–2009)
- Firefly (2002–2003)
- F.L.I.P. Mysteries: Women on the Case (2008)

=== Video games ===
- Uncharted: Drake's Fortune (2007)
- Uncharted 2: Among Thieves (2009)
- Uncharted 3: Drake's Deception (2011)

== Awards ==
Year	Award	Category	Work	Result
1991	Emmy Award	Outstanding Achievement in Music and Lyrics	Cop Rock ("Oil Of Ol'Lay")	Nominated
2007	Academy of Interactive Arts & Sciences	Outstanding Achievement in Original Music Composition	Uncharted: Drake's Fortune	Nominated
2007	Hollywood Music In Media Award	Best Original Score – Video Game	Uncharted: Drake's Fortune	Nominated
2009	Academy of Interactive Arts & Sciences	Outstanding Achievement in Original Music Composition	Uncharted 2: Among Thieves	Won
2009	British Academy of Film and Television Arts	Best Original Score	Uncharted 2: Among Thieves	Won
2009	British Academy of Film and Television Arts	Best Use of Audio	Uncharted 2: Among Thieves	Won
2009	Game Audio Network Guild	Music of the Year	Uncharted 2: Among Thieves	Won
2009	Game Audio Network Guild	Best Soundtrack Album	Uncharted 2: Among Thieves	Nominated
2009	Game Audio Network Guild	Best Interactive Score	Uncharted 2: Among Thieves	Nominated
2009	Game Audio Network Guild	Best Original Instrumental Song	Uncharted 2: Among Thieves – "Reunion"	Won
2009	Hollywood Music In Media Award	Best Original Score – Video Game	Uncharted 2: Among Thieves	Nominated
