= Camel Bobsled Race =

Live album by DJ Shadow
- Released: 1997
- Genre: Instrumental hip hop
- Length: 23:59
- Label: Mo' Wax
- Producer: DJ Shadow

Professional ratings
Review scores
Source	Rating
AllMusic	3/5 stars
NME	5/10 stars

Camel Bobsled Race, also known as Q-Bert Mix, is a megamix of DJ Shadow's music, mixed by DJ Q-Bert. It was released on Mo' Wax in 1997. It peaked at number 62 on the UK Singles Chart.

In 2026, an unedited and remastered version was released as part of DJ Shadow's The Mo' Wax Singles 1993-1997. This contained 5 minutes of music that had been edited out from the 1997 release due to it containing music produced by DJ Krush.

== Track listing ==
=== Original 1997 release ===
No.	Title	Writer(s)	Length
1.	"Camel Bobsled Race"	DJ Shadow	23:59

=== Unedited 2026 release ===
No.	Title	Writer(s)	Length
1.	"Camel Bobsled Race"	DJ Shadow, DJ Krush	28:59

== Personnel ==
Credits adapted from liner notes.

- DJ Shadow – production
- DJ Q-Bert – additional production, turntables, mixing
- Cut Chemist – "The Number Song (Cut Chemist Party Mix)" beats
- Gift of Gab – vocals
- James Lavelle – recording, liner notes
- Ben Drury – art direction
- E.J. Dobson – art direction
- Kai Clements – sleeve re-creation

== Charts ==
Chart (1997)	Peak position
UK Singles (Official Charts)	62
