= Six Days (song) =

Single by DJ Shadow

from the album The Private Press
- B-side: "100 Metre Dash"
- Released: 2002
- Genre: Electronic
- Length: 5:02
- Label: MCA
- Songwriters: Brian Farrell; Dennis Olivieri; Josh Davis
- Producer: DJ Shadow

DJ Shadow singles chronology
"Monosylabik" (2002)	"Six Days" (2002)	"You Can't Go Home Again" (2002)

"Six Days" is a song by American trip-hop artist DJ Shadow, from his second album, The Private Press. The song was written by Brian Farrell and Dennis Olivieri, and was produced by DJ Shadow. It was released as the third official single from the album in 2002.

The main vocals of the song are sampled from the 1971 song "Six Day War" by the British band Colonel Bagshot, with some riffs taken from the 1970 song "I Cry in the Morning" by the American singer Dennis Olivieri. Brian Farrell of Colonel Bagshot and Olivieri are both given songwriting credits on the track.

== Music video ==
The song's music video was directed by Hong Kong director Wong Kar-wai. It features actor Chang Chen and Malaysian model Danielle Graham.

Shadow approached Wong Kar-wai, one of his favorite directors, in an attempt to create a music video unlike his previous ones. Wong also happened to be a fan of Shadow's music and accepted. The idea was to make a short film revolving around the song's hook line: "Tomorrow never comes until it's too late..."

The plot is centered on a man (Chang) who, upon discovering his girlfriend (Graham) has cheated on him, tries to destroy all traces of their relationship, eventually realizing that this is futile, as what has happened cannot be undone. The video was shot by famed cinematographer Christopher Doyle, who has worked on most of Wong's films and has also shot films by directors Gus Van Sant, Barry Levinson and Phillip Noyce. It contains numerous instances of the number 426, a reference to Wong Kar-wai's then-upcoming film 2046.

== Charts ==
Chart (2002)	Peak position
UK Singles Chart (Official Charts Company)	28
US Dance/Electronic Singles Sales (Billboard)	1

== Certifications ==
Certifications for Six Days
Region	Certification	Certified units/sales
New Zealand (RMNZ)	Platinum	30,000^{‡}
United Kingdom (BPI) Sales since 2004	Silver	200,000^{‡}
^{‡} Sales+streaming figures based on certification alone.

== Use in other media ==
- The remix of this song is mixed with the songs "Annie's Horn" by D-Code, "Shout" by Tears for Fears, and "Where It's At" by Beck in the video game DJ Hero.
- A hip-hop version of the song featuring Mos Def was used in the end credits for the film Phone Booth (2002). It was also used for two films of the Fast & Furious franchise: The Fast and the Furious: Tokyo Drift (2006) and Furious 7 (2015).
- A different and much faster-paced remix, by Soulwax, samples The B-52s song "52 Girls" throughout. This remix ended up on their remix album Most of the Remixes.
