= The Private Press =

2002 studio album by DJ Shadow

Studio album by DJ Shadow
- Released: June 4, 2002
- Studio: The Parlor of Mystery
- Genre: Instrumental hip hop
- Length: 56:57
- Label: MCA
- Producer: DJ Shadow

DJ Shadow chronology
Preemptive Strike (1998)	The Private Press (2002)	The Private Repress (2003)

Singles from The Private Press
- 1. "You Can't Go Home Again" Released: 2002; 2. "Six Days" Released: 2002; 3. "Mashin' on the Motorway" Released: 2003

The Private Press is the second studio album by American hip hop producer DJ Shadow, released by MCA Records on June 4, 2002. It peaked at number 44 on the Billboard 200 chart.

== Critical reception ==
Professional ratings
Aggregate scores
Source	Rating
Metacritic	81/100
Review scores
Source	Rating
AllMusic	4/5 stars
Entertainment Weekly	A−
The Guardian	5/5 stars
Los Angeles Times	3.5/4 stars
NME	6/10
Pitchfork	7.0/10
Q	4/5 stars
Rolling Stone	3.5/5 stars
Uncut	4/5 stars
The Village Voice	A

At Metacritic, which assigns a weighted average score out of 100 to reviews from mainstream critics, the album received an average score of 81, based on 24 reviews, indicating "universal acclaim".

David Browne of Entertainment Weekly wrote, "When Shadow incorporates a bit of '80s synth-pop here or industrial grind there, he's like a conductor waving in new instrumentalists with the flick of his wrist." Pascal Wyse of The Guardian commented that "It is strange for someone who 'creates' so few of his own sounds to have such a distinctive voice, but Shadow finds little ghosts in other people's music and sets them free." Rob Sheffield of Rolling Stone called it "an album full of playful experiments."

Spin included the album on the "40 Best Albums of 2002" list.

== Track listing ==
- All tracks written by Josh Davis, while any other track was co-written with other writers.

No.	Title	Writer(s)	Length
1.	"(Letter from Home)"		1:09
2.	"Fixed Income"	Davis; Steve Cataldo	4:49
3.	"Un Autre Introduction"	Davis; François Bernard; Michaël Larcanche	0:44
4.	"Walkie Talkie"		2:27
5.	"Giving Up the Ghost"		6:30
6.	"Six Days"	Davis; Brian Farrell; Dennis Oliveri	5:02
7.	"Mongrel..."	Davis; Franco Falsini	2:20
8.	"...Meets His Maker"	Davis; Falsini	3:02
9.	"Right Thing/GDMFSOB"		4:20
10.	"Monosylabik"		6:46
11.	"Mashin' on the Motorway"	Davis; Lateef Daumont	2:58
12.	"Blood on the Motorway"		9:12
13.	"You Can't Go Home Again"		7:03
14.	"(Letter from Home)"		0:57

Japanese edition CD bonus tracks
No.	Title	Length
15.	"Flashback"	3:51
16.	"Dark Days (Main Theme)"	4:30

Limited edition CD bonus track
No.	Title	Length
15.	"Giving Up the Ghost" (original version)	6:14

Limited edition CD bonus disc
No.	Title	Length
1.	"Pushin' Buttons Live" (featuring Cut Chemist and DJ Nu-Mark)	12:41

Tour edition CD bonus disc (The Private Repress)
No.	Title	Length
1.	"Right Thing" (Z-Trip 'get the party off mix' in three parts)	6:18
2.	"Six Days" (Soulwax mix)	5:18
3.	"GDMFSOB" (Unkle uncensored)	6:26
4.	"Six Days" (remix)	3:52
5.	"Walkie Talkie" (radio edit)	3:16
6.	"Mashin' on the Motorway" (radio edit)	2:39

== Personnel ==
Credits adapted from liner notes.

- DJ Shadow – production, arrangement, art direction
- Tim Young – mastering
- Keith Tamashiro – art direction
- B+ – photography

== Charts ==
Chart	Peak position
Australian Albums (ARIA)	21
Belgian Albums (Ultratop Flanders)	20
Dutch Albums (Album Top 100)	54
Finnish Albums (Suomen virallinen lista)	37
French Albums (SNEP)	21
German Albums (Offizielle Top 100)	75
Norwegian Albums (VG-lista)	16
UK Albums (OCC)	8
US Billboard 200	44
US Top Dance Albums (Billboard)	3

=== Year-end charts ===
Chart (2002)	Position
Canadian Alternative Albums (Nielsen SoundScan)	161

== Certifications ==
Certifications for The Private Press
Region	Certification	Certified units/sales
United Kingdom (BPI)	Gold	100,000^{^}
^{^} Shipments figures based on certification alone.
