= The Beatnuts discography =

- Studio albums: 8
- Singles: 21
- Music videos: 9
- Instrumental albums: 1
- Production credits: 20
- Guest vocals: 17
- Remixes: 23

The Beatnuts are a hip hop group and production team from Queens, New York. Its two current members, Psycho Les and Juju, have been involved in every Beatnuts album, while Al' Tariq left the Beatnuts after their eponymous 1994 release. The Beatnuts have released six full-length studio albums, two extended plays, one instrumental album, three compilation albums and 21 singles. They have also been featured on other artists' songs as both vocalists and producers. The Beatnuts self-produce all of their songs.

The Beatnuts' debut release was Intoxicated Demons, a 1993 EP released by Relativity Records. It contained two singles setting a minimum for the next two Beatnuts albums, 1994's The Beatnuts: Street Level and 1997's Stone Crazy. 1997 also saw the release of Hydra Beats, Vol. 5, an instrumental album marketed by Hydra Entertainment instead of the Beatnuts' label Relativity. The Beatnuts followed it up with 1998's The Spot, a remix EP containing one previously unreleased track and 1999's hit album A Musical Massacre. Each of these records was released by Relativity Records, but the Beatnuts would soon sign to Relativity's sister label Loud Records. On Loud, the Beatnuts released 2001's Take It or Squeeze It, but they soon left the label to join the indie label Landspeed Records. They then released the 2002 album The Originators to critical success and commercial failure. The Beatnuts next and last album, 2004's Milk Me, was released by Penalty to slightly better commercial reception than The Originators.

== Albums ==
=== Studio albums ===
List of studio albums, with selected chart positions
Title	Album details	Peak chart positions				
Title	Album details	US	US R&B	US Heat.	US Ind.	FRA
The Beatnuts: Street Level	Released: June 21, 1994; Label: Relativity, Violator; Formats: CD, LP, cassette	182	28	3	—	—
Stone Crazy	Released: June 24, 1997; Label: Relativity, Epic; Formats: CD, LP, cassette	154	38	4	—	—
A Musical Massacre	Released: August 10, 1999; Label: Relativity, Loud, Epic; Formats: CD, LP, cassette	35	10	—	—	—
Take It or Squeeze It	Released: March 10, 2001; Label: Loud, Epic; Formats: CD, LP, cassette, digital download	51	20	—	—	—
The Originators	Released: July 23, 2002; Label: Landspeed; Formats: CD, LP, cassette, digital download	—	57	—	25	—
Milk Me	Released: August 30, 2004; Label: Penalty, Rykodisc, HRH Management; Formats: CD, LP, digital download	196	42	—	21	188
"—" denotes a recording that did not chart or was not released in that territory.

=== Compilation albums ===
List of compilation albums
Title	Album details
World Famous Classics: 1993-1998	Released: August 25, 1999; Label: Sony; Formats: CD, LP, cassette
Beatnuts Forever	Released: 2001; Label: Relativity; Formats: LP
Classic Nuts, Vol. 1	Released: February 19, 2002; Label: Relativity, Loud, Epic; Formats: CD, LP, cassette
U.F.O. Files	Released: September 30, 2008; Label: Pit-Fight; Formats: CD, digital download

=== Instrumental albums ===
List of instrumental albums
Title	Album details
Hydra Beats, Vol. 5	Released: July 7, 1997; Label: Hydra; Formats: LP

=== Extended plays ===
List of extended plays, with selected chart positions
Title	Album details	Peak chart positions	
Title	Album details	US Heat.	US R&B
Intoxicated Demons: The EP	Released: April 1993; Label: Relativity, Violator; Formats: CD, LP, cassette	28	50
Remix EP: The Spot	Released: February 10, 1998; Label: Relativity, Epic; Formats: CD, LP, cassette	26	52

== Singles ==
=== As lead artist ===
List of singles as lead artist, with selected chart positions, showing year released and album name
Title	Year	Peak chart positions						Album
Title	Year	US	US Dance Sales	US R&B	US Rap	CAN	UK	Album
"Reign of the Tec"	1993	—	—	—	6	—	—	Intoxicated Demons: The EP
"No Equal"	1993	—	—	—	—	—	—	Intoxicated Demons: The EP
"Props Over Here"	1994	—	14	101	39	—	172	The Beatnuts: Street Level
"Hit Me with That"	1994	—	37	—	—	—	—	The Beatnuts: Street Level
"Hellraiser (Remix)"	1994	—	—	—	—	—	—	Hellraiser 12"
"Find That"	1996	—	—	—	—	—	—	Stone Crazy
"Do You Believe?"	1997	—	10	81	27	—	—	Stone Crazy
"Off the Books" (featuring Big Pun and Cuban Link)	1997	86	5	52	12	—	—	Stone Crazy
"Here's a Drink"	1997	—	—	—	—	—	—	Stone Crazy
"Watch Out Now" (featuring Yellaklaw)	1999	84	—	29	3	17	84	A Musical Massacre
"Se Acabo" (featuring Swinger and Magic Juan)	1999	—	—	—	—	—	—	A Musical Massacre
"No Escapin' This" (featuring Greg Nice and Claudette Sierra)	2001	—	—	56	12	—	47	Take It or Squeeze It
"Let's Git Doe" (featuring Fatman Scoop)	2001	—	—	87	19	—	—	Take It or Squeeze It
"We Got the Funk"	2002	—	—	—	—	—	—	Classic Nuts, Vol. 1
"Buying out the Bar" (featuring Chris Chandler)	2002	—	—	—	—	—	—	The Originators
"Work that Pole"	2002	—	—	—	—	—	—	The Originators
"Simple Murder"	2002	—	—	—	—	—	—	Exclusive Collection
"Ya Betta Believe It"	2003	—	—	—	—	—	—	The Originators
"Hot" (featuring Greg Nice)	2004	—	—	—	—	—	143	Milk Me
"Find Us" (featuring Akon)	2004	—	—	—	—	—	92	Milk Me
"It's Nothing" (featuring A.G. and Gab Goblin)	2004	—	—	—	—	—	—	Milk Me
"—" denotes a recording that did not chart or was not released in that territory.

=== As featured performer ===
List of singles as featured performer, with selected chart positions, showing year released and album name
Title	Year	Peak chart positions	Album
Title	Year	UK	Album
"Out for the Cash" (DJ Honda featuring Al' Tariq, Fat Joe and Problemz)	1996	—	DJ Honda
"Dude Descending a Staircase" (Apollo 440 featuring The Beatnuts)	2003	58	Dude Descending a Staircase
"—" denotes a recording that did not chart.

== Music videos ==
Year	Song	Director
1993	"Reign of the Tec"	David Perez Shadi
1993	"No Equal"	David Perez Shadi
1994	"Props Over Here"	Abraham L. Lim
1994	"Hit Me with That"	David Perez Shadi
1996	"Out for the Cash (Deadly Venoms)" (DJ Honda featuring Beatnuts, Common & Fat Joe)	
1997	"Do You Believe?"	—
1997	"Off the Books"	Chris Robinson
1998	On the Mic (DJ Honda featuring Beatnuts & Cuban Link)	
1999	"Watch Out Now / Turn It Out"	Diane Martel
2000	"Reign of the Tec 2000" (YKZ featuring Beatnuts)	
2001	"No Escapin' This"	Nzingha Stewart
2004	"Find Us (In the Back of the Club)"	Uly Terrero
"—" denotes unknown director.

== Vocal appearances ==
Year	Track(s)	Album	Artist(s)
1992	"Let da Horns Blow"^{†}	The Fabulous Chi-Ali	Chi-Ali, Trugoy the Dove, Dres & Phife Dawg
1993	"Rat Bastard"^{†}	Dust to Dust	Prime Minister Pete Nice & Daddy Rich, Psycho Les
1994	"Top Notch"^{†}	A Constipated Monkey	Kurious, Kadi, Lucien, Psycho Les
1994	The Rhythm	Dangerous	Bas Blasta, JuJu, Fat Joe, Lord Finesse
1995	"No Fronts (Psycho Les Pass)"^{†}	—N/a	Dog Eat Dog, Psycho L
1995	"Out for the Cash (5 Deadly Venoms)"	DJ Honda	DJ Honda, Common, Fat Joe
1995	Jamais À L'Heure	SImple et Funky	Alliance Ethnik, Psycho Les
1996	"Peace Akki"^{†}	God Connections	Al' Tariq
1997	"Who the Trifest?"	h II	DJ Honda
1997	"On the Mic"	h II	DJ Honda, JuJu, A.L., Missin' Linx, Cuban Link
1998	"Western Ways (Part 2) (La Seleccion)"^{†}	Non-album single	Delinquent Habits, Big Pun, JuJu
1999	"Esta Loca"	Tell Em Why U Madd	The Madd Rapper
1999	"Beatnuts Forever"^{†}	Violator: The Album	—N/a
1999	"Can't Relate"^{†}	Global Warning	Rascalz
1999	"Party"^{†}	Traffic Jam 2000	Dj Skribble
2000	"Very Good My Friends/ (Dev Large Remix)"	Shadow of the Ape Sounds - Director's Cut	Nigo
2000	"Reign of the Tec 2000"	Japan for Sale	YKZ (various artists)
2000	"Hotness"	Exhibit A	Missin' Linx, Juju
2000	"Pit Fight"^{†}	The Piece Maker	Tony Touch, Psycho Les, Greg Nice
2001	"Rock da Crowd"	h III	DJ Honda, Buttah, Willie Stubbs
2001	"Wild Rodeo"	h III	DJ Honda, Psycho Les
2001	"Screwed Up"^{†}	Loyalty	Screwball, Psycho les
2002	"The Trouble Is..."^{†}	Soundbombing III	—N/a
2002	"Duck Season"	Duck Season, Vol. 1	Babu the Dilated Junkie
2002	"Suicide Bomb"^{†}	The Future Is Now	Non Phixion, Marley Metal, Moonshine
2002	"One of Them"^{†}	Power in Numbers	Jurassic 5, JuJu
2002	"Woody"	Beat of Life Vol. 1	Tomekk
2003	"Original Crhyme Pays" "Crhyme Pays (Remix)"	Politics of the Business	Prince Paul
2003	"Steppin (Remix)"^{†}	Non-album single	Soulive
2004	"Oh My God"	A Long Hot Summer	Masta Ace, Rahzel
2004	"Oh Shit"^{†}	White Sunday	Mareko, Psycho Les
2004	"Capicu"^{†}	The Piece Maker 2	Tony Touch, JuJu, Fat Joe, N.O.R.E.
2004	"Drinks Up"^{†}	Time'll Tell	Triple Seis
2005	"Sofrito Mama"	Reggaetony Album	Tony Touch
2006	"Don't Fail Me Now"	Poison Pen	Chino XL
2006	"Shake It Up"	Stanton Sessions Vol.2	Stanton Warriors
2007	"Shake It Up (Hook N Sling Remix)"	Chew the Fat! @ the End Presents: Hook N Sling	Hook N Sling
2007	"Rollin'"	Port Authority	Marco Polo, A.G., Sadat X
2015	"Junkyard Dogs"	Every Hero Needs a Villain	Czarface
2016	"Dust"	A Fistful of Peril	Czarface
2016	"Bragging Rights"	Feature Magnetic	Kool Keith
"†" denotes track which also features production by The Beatnuts. If neither Beatnut is specifically listed as an artist, then it is a full Beatnuts collaboration

== Remixes/Production ==
Year	Remixed track	Released on	Artist
1990	"Giggahoe (Exremix Vocal)"‡	"Giggahoe"	Shazzy
1990	Watcha Gonna Do	Supernatural	Stereo MC's
1992	Entire album (except track 6)	The Fabulous Chi-Ali	Chi-Ali
1992	"Funky Lemonade (Remix)"	"Let the Horns Blow / Funky Lemonade (Remix)"	Chi-Ali
1992	"Heidi Hoe"	Can I Borrow a Dollar?	Common
1992	"Breaker 1/9 (Beat Nuts Remix)"	"Breaker 1/9"	Common
1992	"Pass the Vibes (The Vibes Mix)"	—N/a	Powerule
1993	"Ain't Got No Class (The Beatnuts Remix)"	—N/a	Da Lench Mob
1993	"Wild Child + (Remix)"	The Aftermath	Da Youngsta's
1993	"Honeycomb Hide Out"	The Aftermath	Da Youngsta's
1993	"It'z Natural"	The Aftermath	Da Youngsta's
1993	"Watch the Sound (The Beatnuts Dirty Remix)"	—N/a	Fat Joe da Gangsta
1993	"I Like It (Lounge Mix)" "I Like It (Vibes Mix)"	—N/a	Jomanda
1993	"Do da What" (Remix)	—N/a	1 of the Girls
1993	"Rat Bastard"	Dust to Dust	Prime Minister Pete Nice
1993	"Verbal Massage"	Dust to Dust	Prime Minister Pete Nice
1993	"Ho"	Dust to Dust	Prime Minister Pete Nice
1993	"Outta My Way Baby"	Dust to Dust	Prime Minister Pete Nice
1993	"Verbal Massage (Part II)"	Dust to Dust	Prime Minister Pete Nice
1993	"Kick the Bobo (Beatnuts Remix)"	—N/a	Prime Minister Pete Nice
1993	"Rip It Up (Beatnuts Remix)"	—N/a	Lin Que
1993	"Will You Ever Save Me (Nutshop Remix)"	—N/a	Lisette Melendez
1993	"I Go On (Mic Professor Mix)"	—N/a	MC Lyte
1993	"Ruffneck (Beatnut Remix)"	—N/a	MC Lyte
1993	"It's On (Beatnuts Remix)"	—N/a	Naughty by Nature
1994	"Dedication to Bambaataa (Beatnuts Mix)"	—N/a	Justice System
1994	"Spell It with a J (Yes, Yes Jorge!)"	A Constipated Monkey	Kurious
1994	"Top Notch"	A Constipated Monkey	Kurious
1994	"Uptown Shit'	A Constipated Monkey	Kurious
1994	"Walk Like a Duck"	A Constipated Monkey	Kurious
1994	"Tear Shit Up"	A Constipated Monkey	Kurious
1994	"Lost in Brooklyn"	Lost in Brooklyn	Down South
1994	"Around the Clock"	Lost in Brooklyn	Down South
1994	"Open Sesame"	Lost in Brooklyn	Down South
1994	"Bounce"	House Party 3 (soundtrack)	Kid n Play
1994	"How'm I Doin'"	House Party 3 (soundtrack)	Kid n Play
1994	"Shade Business (The Beatnuts Remix)"	—N/a	PMD
1994	"Ain't Watcha Do"	The Mouth That Roared...?	Bas Blasta
1994	"No Fronts (Not Pearl Jam mix)" "No Fronts (PsychoLesPass)"	—N/a	Dog Eat Dog
1995	"20世紀 (Beatnuts Remix)"	—N/a	Rhymester
1996	"The Nod Factor"	From Where???	Skillz
1996	"Intro"	God Connections	Al Tariq
1996	"Crime Pays"	God Connections	Al Tariq
1996	"Think Not"	God Connections	Al Tariq
1996	"Do Yo' Thang"	God Connections	Al Tariq
1996	"Foxxy Brown"	God Connections	Al Tariq
1996	"All Over the Track"	God Connections	Al Tariq
1996	"Get Down Baby"	God Connections	Al Tariq
1996	"Peace Akki"	God Connections	Al Tariq
1996	"God's Connect"	God Connections	Al Tariq
1996	"Nikki"	God Connections	Al Tariq
1996	"'96 Cream Hunt" (produced by JuJu)	—N/a	Mr. Mic Rippa
1996	"Screwed Up" (produced by Psycho Les)	—N/a	Screwball
1996	"Genuine"; "Don't Make Me Try"	—N/a	Triflicts
1996	"Le Manege (The Beatnuts Remix)"	Diggin' Into the Real	Mondo Grosso
1996	"Speed (Beatnuts Paradise Mix)"	"Shinji Takeda's Abstract Jazz Lounge"	Shinji Takeda
1997	"Magic Chef" (produced by JuJu)	—N/a	Rawcotiks
1998	"Beware" (produced by JuJu)	Capital Punishment	Big Pun
1998	"On the Job" (produced by JuJu)	—N/a	Gab Gotcha
1998	"State to State (Pimp Remix)" "State to State (Mafia Remix)"	—N/a	No I.D.
1998	"Rock On"	—N/a	Cuban Link, Triple Seis
1998	"Western Ways (Part II)" (produced by JuJu)	—N/a	Delinquent Habits
1998	"Pimpin'" (produced by Psycho Les)	—N/a	Willie Stubs
1998	"Pimps, Players, Macks" (produced by JuJu)	Big Meal	
1999	"Lucky Day (Beatnuts Remix)"	Groove Remixes	Harumi Tsuyuzaki
1999	"Can't Relate" (produced by Psycho Les)	Global Warning	Rascalz
1999	"Watcha Gonna Do?" (produced by JuJu)	The Album	Terror Squad
1999	"New World Water" (produced by Psycho Les)	Black on Both Sides	Yasiin Bey
1999	"Rock n Roll" (produced by Psycho Les) {co-produced by Mos Def}	Black on Both Sides	Yasiin Bey
2000	"One" (produced by JuJu)	Supreme Clientele	Ghostface Killah
2000	"Life Liquid" (produced by JuJu)	2000 B.C. (Before Can-I-Bus)	Canibus
2000	"Toca's Intro" (produced by Psycho Les)	The Piece Maker	Tony Touch
2000	"Pit Fight" (produced by Psycho Les)	The Piece Maker	Tony Touch
2000	"Drops from Heaven (Beatnuts Remix)"	—N/a	Zooco
2001	"J.O.S.E." (produced by Psycho Les)	Jealous Ones Still Envy (J.O.S.E.)	Fat Joe
2001	"Self-Righteous Spics" (produced by Psycho Les)	We Be About 12"	Arsonists
2001	"Self Defense" (produced by JuJu)	Expansion Team	Dilated Peoples
2001	"Screwed Up"	Loyalty	Screwball
2002	"Suicide Bomb" (produced by JuJu)	The Future Is Now	Non Phixion
2002	"The Trouble Is..."	Soundbombing III	The Beatnuts
2002	"If You Only Knew" (produced by JuJu)	Power in Numbers	Jurassic 5
2002	"One of Them" (produced by JuJu)	Power in Numbers	Jurassic 5
2003	"Steppin (Remix)"	—N/a	Soulive
2004	"Capicu" (produced by JuJu)	The Piece Maker 2	Tony Touch
2004	"A Beautiful Day" (produced by Psycho Les)	The Piece Maker 2	Tony Touch
2004	"Oh Shit"	White Sunday	Mareko
2004	"Drinks Up" (produced by Psycho Les)	Only Time'll Tell	Triple Seis
2004	"War" (produced by Psycho Les). {co-produced by Mos Def}	The New Danger	Mos Def
2006	"Do My Thang" {produced by Psycho L.E.S.}	The Resident Patient	Inspectah Deck
2013	"Bars" (produced by JuJu)	The Piece Maker 3	Tony Touch
2013	"Street Corner Freestyle" (produced by JuJu)	The Piece Maker 3	Tony Touch
2013	"How to Survive the Apocalypse" (produced by Psycho Les)	The Grimy Awards	Ill Bill
2020	"Legendary Loser" (produced by Psycho Les)	All My Heroes Are Dead	R.A. the Rugged Man

== Solo work ==
- God Connections (1996) – by Al' Tariq
- Kool Fresh (1997) – by Al' Tariq
- Psycho Therapy (The Soundtrack) (2007) – by Psycho Les
- The City Never Sleeps (2007) – by Psycho Les, Al' Tariq & Problemz as Big City
