= Remix EP: The Spot =

EP by The Beatnuts
- Released: February 10, 1998
- Studio: Chung King (New York City)
- Genre: Hip hop
- Length: 30:11
- Label: Relativity; Epic
- Producer: The Beatnuts

The Beatnuts chronology
Hydra Beats, Vol. 5 (1997)	Remix EP: The Spot (1998)	A Musical Massacre (1999)

Professional ratings
Review scores
Source	Rating
AllMusic	3/5 stars
RapReviews	6/10
The Source	3/5 stars

The Spot is the second extended play and only remix EP by American hip hop group The Beatnuts. It was released on February 10, 1998, via Relativity/Epic Records. Recording sessions took place at Chung King Studios in New York. Produced by the Beatnuts, it is composed mainly of remixes: it also has three sequel songs and one new recording, "Treat$". The sequels features new vocals over the original beats while the remixes contains the original vocals set to new music. The source of its remixes are songs from prior Beatnuts albums Intoxicated Demons: The EP, The Beatnuts: Street Level and Stone Crazy. It features guest appearances from A.L., Nogoodus and Rawcoticks.

The EP peaked at number 52 on the Billboard Top R&B/Hip-Hop Albums in the United States.

== Track listing ==
All tracks are written by yes.

No.	Title	Writer(s)	Length
1.	"R U Ready II"	Lester Fernandez; Jerry Tineo	3:30
2.	"Get Funky Remix"	Fernandez; Berntony Smalls; Tineo	4:32
3.	"No Equal Remix"	Fernandez; Tineo; Smalls	4:18
4.	"Psycho Dwarf II" (featuring Nogoodus)	Fernandez; Tineo	4:23
5.	"Off the Books Remix"	Fernandez; Tineo	3:03
6.	"Let off a Couple II" (featuring A.L. & Rawcotiks)	Fernandez; Tineo	2:59
7.	"Props Over Here Remix"	Fernandez; Tineo; Smalls	3:29
8.	"Treat$" (featuring Nogoodus, A.L. & Rawcotiks)	Fernandez; Tineo	3:57
Total length:			30:11

== Charts ==
Chart (1998)	Peak position
US Top R&B/Hip-Hop Albums (Billboard)	52
