= Cuban Link discography =

The discography of American rapper Cuban Link.

== Albums ==
List of albums, with selected details and chart positions
Title	Details	Peak chart positions		
Title	Details	US	US R&B	US Rap
The Album (with Terror Squad)	Released: September 21, 1999; Label: Terror Squad Entertainment / Atlantic Records	22	4	—
Chain Reaction	Released: August 16, 2005; Label: M.O.B Records / Universal Music Group	188	44	22
Hijo De La Calle	Released: October 28, 2026; Label: CLK Entertainment			

== Mixtapes ==
Year	Title
2002	Broken Chains
2004	Broken Chains 2: Chainsaw Massacre
2005	Man on Fire
2007	Bang Bang Boogie: The Machine Vol. 1 (with Bang Bang Boogie)
2008	Bang Bang Boogie: X Files "No Mercy for the Weak" (with Bang Bang Boogie)
2009	CLK ENT. Presents: BX We Go Hard Mixtape
2011	Chain Gang Bully
2012	Chain Gang Bully 2

== Singles ==
=== As lead artist ===
Year	Title	Peak chart positions			Album
Year	Title	U.S. R&B	U.S. Rap	U.S. Latin	Album
2000	"Flowers for the Dead" (featuring D'Mingo)	50	2	—	24K
2000	"Still Telling Lies" (featuring Tony Sunshine)	92	—	—	24K
2000	"Why Me?" (with Fat Joe)	—	—	—	Bait/24K
2005	"Sugar Daddy" (featuring Mýa)	—	—	—	Chain Reaction
2005	"Scandalous" (featuring Don Omar)	—	—	45	Chain Reaction
2011	"Shawty What Your Name Is" (featuring Trey Songz)	-	-	-	Chain Gang Bully 2
2015	"Nobody Gotta Know" (featuring Julio Mena)	-	-	-	Non-album single
2015	"What Would You Do?" (featuring Julio Mena)	-	-	-	Non-album single
2017	"Open Book"	-	-	-	Non-album single
2018	"Son of Tony" (with Balistic Man and David Correy)	-	-	-	Non-album single
2019	"On My New York Shit"	-	-	-	The Missing Link
2022	"Letter to Pun, Pt. 2 (3 Sides to a Story)"	-	-	-	The Missing Link
2023	"Undeniable"	-	-	-	The Missing Link
2023	"Love Me or Leave Me Alone" (with Alx8)	-	-	-	The Missing Link
2023	"Santa Maria"	-	-	-	The Missing Link
2023	"Abusadora"	-	-	-	The Missing Link
2023	"Jewelry" (featuring Tragedy Khadafi and Sha)	-	-	-	The Missing Link
2023	"Miami"	-	-	-	The Missing Link
2025	"Hit Da Road Crack" (with T.A.)	-	-	-	Non-album single

=== As featured artist ===
Year	Title	Peak chart positions			Album
Year	Title	U.S.	U.S. R&B	U.S. Rap	Album
1997	"Off the Books" (The Beatnuts featuring Big Pun and Cuban Link)	86	52	12	Stone Crazy
1997	"Someone to Hold" (Veronica featuring Big Pun and Cuban Link)	-	101	—	Rise
1997	"On the Mic" (DJ Honda featuring Cuban Link, JuJu, A.L. and Missin' Linx)	-	89	—	HII
1998	"Bet Ya Man Can't (Triz)" (Fat Joe featuring Big Pun, Cuban Link and Triple Seis)	-	54	37	Don Cartagena
2001	"Live at Jimmy's" (Angie Martinez featuring Big Pun, Cuban Link, SunKiss and D-Mingo)	-	-	-	Up Close and Personal
2003	"Real Gangstas" (Squabble featuring Cuban Link and Alfonzo Hunter)	-	-	-	Non-album single
2005	"All I Need" (Rican featuring Cuban Link)	-	-	-	Faded
2005	"Rock Solid" (Wade Waters featuring Cuban Link)	-	-	-	Dark Water
2007	"Asi So Yoy" (Zaturno featuring Cuban Link and Zay)	-	-	-	Zaturno Espacial
2014	"Champagne" (David Correy featuring Cuban Link)	-	-	-	Urban Rock, Vol. 3
2025	"Here We Go" (Lord Jamar featuring Cuban Link and T.A.)	-	-	-	Non-album single

=== Promotional singles ===
Year	Title	Peak chart positions			Album
Year	Title	U.S.	U.S. R&B	U.S. Rap	Album
2000	"Toe to Toe" (featuring Big Pun)	-	-	-	24K
2000	"Play How You Want (featuring P!NK)	-	-	-	24K
2005	"Shakedown"	-	-	-	Chain Reaction
2005	"Talk About It" (featuring Jadakiss)	-	-	-	Chain Reaction

== Guest appearances ==
List of non-single guest appearances, with other performing artists, showing year released and album name
Title	Year	Artist(s)	Album
"Must Be the Music"	1997	Big Pun, DJ Skribble	Traffic Jams
"Glamour Life"	1998	Big Pun, Triple Seis, Fat Joe, Armageddon	Capital Punishment
"BX Soldiers"	1998	Severe, Prospect, Chadio	—N/a
"Freestyle over Xzibit "At the Speed of Life" Instrumental"	1998	Funkmaster Flex, Big Pun, Fat Joe, Armageddon	The Mix Tape, Vol. III
"The Hidden Hand"	1998	Fat Joe, Terror Squad	Don Cartagena
"Terror Squadrons"	1998	Fat Joe, Terror Squad	Don Cartagena
"None Like You" (Remix)	1998	Aaron Hall, Big Pun, Fat Joe, Unique	Inside of You
"Quiet on Tha Set"	1998	Big Pun, Fat Joe	Straight Outta Compton: N.W.A 10th Anniversary Tribute
"Livin' La Vida Loca" (Trackmasters Remix)	1999	Ricky Martin, Big Pun, Fat Joe	Non-album single
"When I Die"	1999	Krayzie Bone, Fat Joe, Big Pun	Thug Mentality 1999
"Spanish Fly"	1999	Dyme, Tony Sunshine	Diamonds in the Ruff
"Slam Pit"	1999	The Beatnuts, Common	A Musical Massacre
"U Know What's Up" (Millennium Rapdown Remix)	2000	Donell Jones, Xzibit, Pharoahe Monch, Fat Joe, 50 Cent, Treach	—N/a
"We Don't Care"	2000	Big Pun	Yeeeah Baby
"Thank You Mi Amor"	2000	Crystal Sierra	Morena
"Hey Luv"	2000	D.I.T.C., Milano	D.I.T.C.
"Slippery When Wet"	2000	Uncle Luke, Big Pun, Armageddon	Luke's Freak Fest 2000
"Dyin' 4 Rap" (Remix)	2001	Fredro Starr, Capone-N-Noreaga, Young Noble	Firestarr
"All I Want Is You"	2001	Jon B	Pleasures U Like
"Where You At?"	2001	Don Dinero, One Solo	—N/a
"Straight Blazin'	2001	—N/a	Blazin' The Soundtrack
"Don't Fight No More"	2002	Luc Duc, One Solo, P.M.	In My Own World
"Drinks Up"	2004	Triple Seis, The Beatnuts	Only Time'll Tell
"Hustler"	2004	Triple Seis, Evil Twins	Only Time'll Tell
"Be About It"	2004	Triple Seis, Evil Twins	Only Time'll Tell
"Se Formo El Bayú"	2005	Ñengo Flow, Don Omar	Flow Callejero
"No Respect"	2005	MC Ceja	Buddha's Family 2: Desde La Prisión
"Rock Solid"	2006	Wade Waters	Dark Water
"Nos Tienen Miedo 2"	2010	Poe Rilla, Zaturno, K. Sikario, Melymel, Pato Pooh, Reychesta, El Pope, Temperamento	Nuestro Amor
"Como Yo"	2010	Arianna Puello	Kombate o Muere
"Let The Dollars Circulate"	2010	Poe Rilla	My Bloody Life
The Block Is Hot"	2010	Poe Rilla, Mysonne, S-One, Zay, Ricky	My Bloody Life
"Llego Mi Hora"	2011	Zaturno, Poe Rilla	Esencial
"What Else"	2012	Grand Daddy I.U.	Self Made Man
"Pelikan Flieg"	2013	Eko Fresh, SSIO	Eksodus
"I'm the Latino"	2018	Kiño	Los Marcos EP
