= Classic Nuts, Vol. 1 =

Greatest hits album by The Beatnuts
- Released: February 19, 2002
- Genre: Hip hop
- Label: Relativity; Loud; Epic

The Beatnuts chronology
Beatnuts Forever (2001)	Classic Nuts, Vol. 1 (2002)	The Originators (2002)

Singles from Classic Nuts, Vol. 1
- 1. "We Got the Funk" Released: March 19, 2002

Professional ratings
Review scores
Source	Rating
AllMusic	4/5 stars
AllHipHop.com	4.5/5 stars

Classic Nuts, Vol. 1 is the last of three greatest hits albums by hip hop group The Beatnuts. It was released by Loud Records during its merger with Relativity on February 19, 2002. Released prior to The Originators, another 2002 Beatnuts album, it only contains songs from The Beatnuts' first four full-length albums and Intoxicated Demons: The EP. It additionally features two exclusive songs, "We Got the Funk" and "However Whenever (You Want It)". The album failed to chart, but received a positive review from Allmusic.

== Track listing ==
#	Title	Performers	Time	Samples
1	"World Famous"	Psycho Les, V.I.C., JuJu	4:25	"Buffalo Gals" by Malcolm McLaren; "Umbakwen" by Cannonball Adderley; "Ode to Billy Joel" by Lou Donaldson; "Matrix" by Dizzy Gillespie; "The Adoration" by The Electric Prunes; "Buffalo Gals" by Malcolm McLaren; "Diggin' in the Crates" by Showbiz and A.G.
2	"Watch Out Now"	Psycho Les, JuJu, Yellaklaw	2:53	"Hi-Jack" by Enoch Light
3	"No Escapin' This (Alternate Vocal Version)"	Psycho Les, JuJu, Greg Nice, Claudette Sierra	3:54	"A Little Fugue for You and Me" by Enoch Light; "Off the Books" by The Beatnuts
4	"Off the Books"	Big Pun, Cuban Link, JuJu, Psycho Les	3:33	"Break that Party and Opening" by Melvin Van Peebles; "Sign Song" by Buddy Baker; "Hihache" by Lafayette Afro Rock Band; "Get out of My Life, Woman" by George Semper
5	"Get Funky"	JuJu, Psycho Les, Fashion	3:01	"Tramp" by Lowell Fulson; "Painted Desert" by Roy Ayers
6	"Props Over Here"	Fashion, Psycho Les, JuJu, Lenny Underwood (keyboards)	3:56	"Wee Tina" by Donald Byrd & Booker Little; "The Bridge" by MC Shan
7	"Beatnuts Forever"	Psycho Les, JuJu, Triple Seis, Marlon Manson	3:11	"Giving Up" by Zulema
8	"Se Acabo (Remix)"	JuJu, Psycho Les, Method Man	3:28	"Se Acabo" by Marco Antonio Muñiz
9	"Turn It Out"	Psycho Les, JuJu, Greg Nice	4:33	"A Nightingale Sang in Berkeley Square" by The New Vaudeville Band
10	"Reign of the Tec"	JuJu, Psycho Les	3:20	"Wicked World" by Black Sabbath; "Punks Jump Up to Get Beat Down (Remix)" by Brand Nubian
11	"However Whenever (You Want It)"	Psycho Les, JuJu, Al' Tariq	3:00	
12	"We Got the Funk"	JuJu, Psycho Les, Mellanie	3:17	"It's So Different Here" by Rachel Sweet
