= Five Deadly Venoms (disambiguation) =

Five Deadly Venoms is a 1978 Hong Kong martial arts film directed by Chang Cheh.

Five Deadly Venoms may also refer to:

- 5 Deadly Venoms of Brooklyn, a hip hop mixtape by various artists
- "5 Deadly Venoms", a song by DJ Kay Slay and Greg Street on the album The Champions: North Meets South
