= No Escapin' This =

Single by The Beatnuts

from the album Take It or Squeeze It
- B-side: "It's Da Nuts"
- Released: February 13, 2001
- Recorded: 2000
- Genre: East Coast hip hop
- Length: 4:16
- Label: Loud Records
- Songwriter(s): Lester Fernandez, Greg Mays
- Producer(s): The Beatnuts

The Beatnuts singles chronology
"Se Acabo" (1999)	"No Escapin' This" (2001)	"Let's Git Doe" (2001)

"No Escapin' This" is the first single from Take It or Squeeze It, a 2001 album by East Coast hip hop group The Beatnuts. It was released by Loud Records in 2001 in both 12 inch and CD format. The song is produced by The Beatnuts and features braggadocious raps by Juju and Psycho Les, as well as ad libs performed by Greg Nice and a chorus performed by Claudette Sierra. The track's beat samples "A Little Fugue for You and Me" by Enoch Light. The song's refrain contains a vocal sample from Psycho Les' verse on "Off the Books" by The Beatnuts.

"No Escapin' This" is the only single from Take It or Squeeze It to chart, but it failed to appear on both the Billboard Hot 100 and Rhythmic Top 40 like prior singles. It reached #56 on the Hot R&B/Hip-Hop Singles & Tracks charts and #12 on the Hot Rap Singles chart, though, because of its "party and bullshit formula" and "percussive choral loop". Its popularity landed it on two Beatnuts hits compilations: Beatnuts Forever and Classic Nuts, Vol. 1. It can additionally be found on two 2001 hip hop compilations: Lovin' It: The Cream of R&B & UK Garage and Wrap It Up. Its music video was directed by Nzingha Stewart.

== Single track list ==
=== CD single (671056 1) ===
1. "No Escapin' This (Clean)" (3:50)
2. "It's Da Nuts (Explicit)" (4:07)

=== CD single (671056 1) ===
1. "No Escapin' This (Radio Edit)"
2. "No Escapin' This (Album Clean)"
3. "No Escapin' This (Instrumental)"

=== US 12" vinyl (1983-1) ===
==== A-Side ====
1. "No Escapin' This (Dirty)" (3:51)
2. "No Escapin' This (Clean)" (3:50)
3. "No Escapin' This (Instrumental)" (3:50)

==== B-Side ====
1. "It's Da Nuts (Dirty)" (4:10)
2. "It's Da Nuts (Clean)" (4:11)
3. "It's Da Nuts (Instrumental)" (4:10)

=== US 12" vinyl (671056 6) ===
==== A-Side ====
1. "No Escapin' This (Explicit)" (4:16)
2. "No Escapin' This (Instrumental)" (3:50)

==== B-Side ====
1. "It's Da Nuts (Explicit)" (4:07)
2. "It's Da Nuts (Alternate Vocal Version)" (4:14)

=== US 12" vinyl (RPROLP 4473) ===
==== A-Side ====
1. "No Escapin' This (Radio Edit)" (3:29)
2. "No Escapin' This (Instrumental)" (3:50)

==== B-Side ====
1. "No Escapin' This (Album Version)" (3:51)
2. "No Escapin' This (Clean Album Version)" (3:50)

=== UK 12" vinyl (671341 6) ===
==== A-Side ====
1. "No Escapin' This (Explicit)"

==== B-Side ====
1. "No Escapin' This (Alternate Vocal Version)"
2. "It's Da Nuts (Explicit)"

=== UK 12" vinyl (XPR3465) ===
==== A-Side ====
1. "No Escapin' This (Dirty)" (3:51)
2. "No Escapin' This (Alternate Vocal Version)" (3:58)
3. "No Escapin' This (Clean)"

==== B-Side ====
1. "No Escapin' This (Instrumental)" (3:50)
2. "No Escapin' This (Acappella)" (3:43)

== Charts ==
Chart (2001)	Peak position
Scotland (OCC)	90
UK Hip Hop/R&B (OCC)	11
UK Singles (OCC)	47
US Hot R&B/Hip-Hop Songs (Billboard)	56
US Hot Rap Songs (Billboard)	12
