= Lucien Revolucien =

French hip-hop artist

Lucien M'baïdem, better known as Lucien Revolucien, also Lucien M'B and Papalu, is a French hip-hop artist who was influential in the hip-hop movement in France in the 1990s.

Lucien Revolucien is featured on Afrika Bambaataa's 1989 release "Hip-Hop Against Apartheid"/"L'Unité Africaine". Lucien was also an MC for the late-night live hip-hop sessions with DJ Dee Nasty on Radio Nova from 1988 to 1993. He has been affiliated with the Native Tongues Posse (a group that includes A Tribe Called Quest, Jungle Brothers, De La Soul, Queen Latifah, Black Sheep) and to The Beatnuts (he is the only outside producer who made a song for The Beatnuts: "Ya Don't Stop" on their first album, The Beatnuts: Street Level).

A Tribe Called Quest included a song dedicated to Lucien ("Luck of Lucien") on their first LP, People's Instinctive Travels and the Paths of Rhythm. Common also featured a similar song on his album Electric Circus, "Heaven Somewhere".

Lucien moved back to France in 1995, where he works on the hip hop soundtrack of hit TV series Les Lascars.

== Guest appearances and production work ==
- Jungle Brothers – "Belly Dancin' Dina" (~Oriental Break), "Black Woman"(Intro.) – on "Done By the Forces of Nature" 1989 (Background Vocals)
- Jimmy Jay -"?"(*) – on "Cool Sessions-Vol. 1"
- Alliance Ethnik – "Jamais à L'Heure" 1995 (feat. Psycho Les.)
- The Beatnuts – "Ya Don't Stop" – on "The Beatnuts: Street Level" 1994 (Prod.: Lucien)
- Kurious - "Top Notch" - on " A Constipated Monkey" 1994
- Suprême NTM – "Check The Flow" – on "Paris Sous Les Bombes" 1995
- Guru / Various – "Lifesaver" – on "Jazzmatazz, Vol. II: The New Reality" 1995
- Afro Jazz – "Trois Spliffs & Un Freestyle" – on compilation "L432" 1995
- Afro Jazz – "Perle Noire " & " Paris-NewYork" (First EP) 1996 (Prod.: Papalu )
- Afro Jazz – "Guerre Des Nerfs" – in "Afrocalypse" 1997 (feat. Suprême NTM.)
- Afro Jazz – "Tout de Go" – on "AJ-1 : Révélation" 1999 (feat. L Loco, Fdy Phenomen) (Prod.: Papalu )
- Ärsenik – "Lascars" – 1999 (feat. Lord Kossity)

== See also ==
- Native Tongues Posse
