= Living in the City =

Living in the City may refer to:

- Living in the City (album), a 1996 album by Northern Lights
- Livin' in the City, a 2005 album by the Fun Lovin' Criminals
- Living in the City, a 1992 album by TJ Davis
- "Living in the City", a 1994 song by Des'ree
- "Living in the City", a 2007 song by Grinspoon from Alibis & Other Lies
- "Living in the City", a 2005 song by Cuban Link from Man On Fire Mixtape
- "Living in the City", a song by Hurray for the Riff Raff from The Navigator
- "Living in the City", a song from Sonic R
