= Buying out the Bar =

Single by The Beatnuts

from the album The Originators
- B-side: "Originate"
- Released: November 19, 2002
- Genre: East Coast hip hop
- Length: 3:21
- Label: Landspeed Records
- Songwriters: Lester Fernandez, Jerry Tineo
- Producer: The Beatnuts

The Beatnuts singles chronology
"We Got the Funk" (2002)	"Buying out the Bar" (2002)	"Duck Season" (2002)

"Buying out the Bar" is the first single from The Originators, a 2002 album by East Coast hip hop group The Beatnuts. It was released by Landspeed Records in 2002 as a 12 inch with "Originate" as its b-side. The song is produced by The Beatnuts and features raps by Juju and Psycho Les, as well as a chorus performed by Chris Chandler. The song's lyrics are both braggadocios and supportive of hedonistic pleasures. The song's beat is characterized by its repetitive accordion loop.

"Buying out the Bar" failed to chart or receive an accompanying music video. The song still received positive critical attention: Low Key of MVRemix.com described it as a "classic Beatnuts party anthem," while Steve "Flash" Juon of RapReviews.com claimed its beat is "fat."

== Single track list ==
=== A-Side ===
1. "Buying out the Bar (Clean)"
2. "Buying out the Bar (Clean)"
3. "Buying out the Bar (Instrumental)"

=== B-Side ===
1. "Originate (Clean)"
2. "Originate (Dirty)"
3. "Originate (Instrumental)"
