= Suprême NTM (album) =

Studio album by Suprême NTM
- Released: 20 April 1998
- Genre: French hip hop
- Length: 54:28
- Language: French
- Label: Epic
- Producer: Sully Sefil, DJ Spank, LG Experience, Madizm, Sulee B Wax, Daddy Jockno, Willy Gunz, Zoxeakopat, NTM

Suprême NTM chronology
Paris Sous Les Bombes (1995)	Suprême NTM (1998)	NTM Live... du Monde de demain à Pose ton gun (2000)

Singles from Suprême NTM
- 1. "Laisse pas traîner ton fils" Released: 1998; 2. "Dans ma Benz" Released: 1998; 3. "That's my people" Released: 1999; 4. "Pose ton gun" Released: 1999

Suprême NTM is the fourth album of the French hip hop group Suprême NTM.

== Track listing ==
1. "Intro" (Madizm / Kool Shen) - 1:13
2. "Back dans les bacs" (Kool Shen / Sec.Undo / LG Experience / Joey Starr) - 3:17
3. "Laisse pas traîner ton fils" (Sulee B Wax / Joey Starr / Kool Shen) - 3:57
4. "That's my People" (NTM / Sully Sefil / Kool Shen) - 4:11
5. "Seine-Saint-Denis Style" (Daddy Jokno / Joey Starr / Kool Shen) - 3:20
6. "Interlude" (Kool Shen / Joey Starr) - 0:31
7. "Ma B*nz" with Lord Kossity (DJ Spank / Lord Kossity / Joey Starr / Kool Shen) - 4:06
8. "C'est arrivé près d'chez toi" with Jahyze (DJ Spank / Jahyze / Joey Starr / Kool Shen) - 4:01
9. "On est encore là (I)" (Sec.Undo / Joey Starr / Kool Shen) - 3:39
10. "Odeurs de soufre" (DJ Spank / Jahyze / Joey Starr / Kool Shen) - 4:28
11. "Je vise juste" (DJ Spank / Jahyze / Joey Starr / Kool Shen) - 3:13
12. "Pose ton gun" (Joey Starr / Kool Shen / Willie Gunz) - 3:39
13. "Respire" (Madizm / Joey Starr / Kool Shen) - 3:40
14. "On est encore là (II)" (Zoxeakopat / Joey Starr / Kool Shen) - 3:57
15. "Hardcore sur le beat, freestyle" (LG Experience / Mass / Busta Flex / Joey Starr / Kool Shen) - 4:41
16. "Outro" (Willie Gunz / Joey Starr / Kool Shen) - 2:28

== Samples ==
"That's my People"

- "Prelude in E Minor, Op. 28, No. 4" composed by Frédéric Chopin
- "Intro" de l'album Enigma by Keith Murray(sample vocal)
- "What The Blood Clot" by Method Man (sample vocal)

"Seine-Saint-Denis Style"

- "That's Where The Happy People Go" by The Trammps

"C'est arrivé près d'chez toi"

- "Lyphard Melodie" by Richard Clayderman

On est encore là

- "The Long Wait" by Morton Stevens

"Odeurs de soufre"

- "Dwyck" by GangStarr

"Pose ton gun"

- "And I Love Her" by Bobby Womack

"Hardcore sur le beat"

- "Thru Metamorphic Rocks" by Tangerine Dream

== Charts ==
=== Weekly charts ===
Chart (1998)	Peak position
Belgian Albums (Ultratop Wallonia)	12
French Albums (SNEP)	1

=== Year-end charts ===
Chart (1998)	Position
Belgian Albums (Ultratop Wallonia)	53
French Albums (SNEP)	11
