= Work That Pole =

"Work that Pole"

Single by The Beatnuts

from the album The Originators
- Released: 2002
- Genre: East Coast hip hop
- Length: 3:59
- Label: Landspeed Records
- Songwriter(s): Lester Fernandez, Jerry Tineo, Joseph Hernandez
- Producer(s): The Beatnuts

The Beatnuts singles chronology
"Duck Season" (2002)	"Work that Pole" (2002)	"Simple Murder" (2003)

"Work that Pole" is the second single from The Originators, a 2002 album by East Coast hip hop group The Beatnuts. It was released by Landspeed Records in 2002 as a promo 12 inch. The song is produced by The Beatnuts and features raps by Juju, Psycho Les and Tony Touch, as well as a chorus by an uncredited female vocalist. As a featured performer, Tony Touch also provides scratches on "Work that Pole". The song's lyrics detail encounters with attractive women. The song's beat is characterized by its quick drums, vocal sample and minimalistic Latin vibe.

"Work that Pole" failed to chart or receive an accompanying music video. The song still received positive critical attention: Low Key of MVRemix.com described it as "a funky stripper anthem that should have everybody in the club's going crazy," while Steve "Flash" Juon of RapReviews.com claimed that Tony Touch added a positive touch to the "sexed out" track. The well-received song was featured on Landspeed Records' compilation Essential Underground Hip Hop, Vol. 1.

== Single track list ==
=== A-Side ===
1. "Work that Pole (Dirty)"
2. "Work that Pole (Clean)"
3. "Work that Pole (TV track)"

=== B-Side ===
1. "Work that Pole (Instrumental)"
2. "Work that Pole (Accapella)"
