= It's Nothing =

Single by The Beatnuts featuring A.G. & Goblin

from the album Milk Me
- B-side: "Confused Rappers"
- Released: December 7, 2004
- Genre: East Coast hip hop
- Length: 3:34
- Label: Penalty Recordings
- Songwriters: Lester Fernandez, Jerry Tineo, Andre Barnes, G. Mendez
- Producer: The Beatnuts

The Beatnuts singles chronology
"Find Us" (2004)	"It's Nothing" (2004)	"Shake It Up" (2006)

"It's Nothing" is the third and final single from Milk Me, a 2004 album by East Coast hip hop group The Beatnuts. It was released by Penalty Recordings as a 12 inch with "Confused Rappers" as its b-side. The song is produced by The Beatnuts and features rapped verses by Juju, Psycho Les and guest rapper A.G., as well as a chorus performed by Gab Goblin. The song is lyrically composed of braggadocios metaphors and punchlines. The song's beat is characterized by a flute sample and quick drums giving it a "futuristic funk" sound. The song also features live instrumentation provided by keyboardist Neal Evans.

Although "It's Nothing" failed to chart or receive an accompanying music video, it elicited positive critical attention: Tom Doggett of RapReviews.com considers it comparable to The Beatnuts' 1997 hit single "Off the Books" because of its flute sample. Robert DeGracia of AllHipHop.com claims that "It's Nothing" proves the great prowess of Beatnuts production, whilst complementing guest rapper A.G.

== Single track list ==
=== A-Side ===
1. "It's Nothing (Album)"
2. "It's Nothing (Radio)"
3. "It's Nothing (Instrumental)"

=== B-Side ===
1. "Confused Rappers (Album)"
2. "Confused Rappers (Radio)"
3. "Confused Rappers (Instrumental)"
