= Ya Betta Believe It =

Single by The Beatnuts

from the album The Originators
- B-side: "U Crazy"
- Released: April 28, 2003
- Genre: East Coast hip hop
- Length: 3:42
- Label: Landspeed Records
- Songwriter(s): Lester Fernandez, Jerry Tineo
- Producer(s): The Beatnuts

The Beatnuts singles chronology
"Simple Murder" (2003)	"Ya Betta Believe It" (2003)	"Hot" (2004)

"Ya Betta Believe It" is the third and final single from The Originators, a 2002 album by East Coast hip hop group The Beatnuts. It was released by Landspeed Records as a 12 inch with "U Crazy" as its United States b-side and "Bring the Funk Back" as its United Kingdom b-side. The song is produced by The Beatnuts and features raps by Juju and Psycho Les, as well as a chorus sung by Chris Chandler. The song's lyrics tell of The Beatnuts' rise to becoming a well-respected group. The song's beat is characterized by a slow funk loop sampled from "Family" by Hubert Laws.

The song received mixed critical attention: Kingsley Marshmallow of Allmusic considers its lyrics to be both "uninspired" and "geographically challenged" in reference to various shout-outs during the song. Low Key of MVRemix.com also critiques the song claiming it sounds "forced" and "stale." Nonetheless, Steve "Flash" Juon of RapReviews.com praises the song's "disco funk stylings" and claims that Psycho Les' verse was amongst his "best in half a decade."

== Single track list ==
=== US 12" vinyl ===
==== A-Side ====
1. "Ya Betta Believe It (Clean)"
2. "Ya Betta Believe It (Dirty)"
3. "Ya Betta Believe It (Instrumental)"

==== B-Side ====
1. "U Crazy (Clean)"
2. "U Crazy (Dirty)"
3. "U Crazy (Instrumental)"

=== UK 12" vinyl ===
==== A-Side ====
1. "Ya Betta Believe It (Clean)"
2. "Ya Betta Believe It (Dirty)"
3. "Ya Betta Believe It (Instrumental)"

==== B-Side ====
1. "Bring the Funk Back (Clean)"
2. "Bring the Funk Back (Dirty)"
3. "Bring the Funk Back (Instrumental)"
