= Hot (Beatnuts song) =

Single by The Beatnuts

from the album Milk Me
- Released: July 29, 2004
- Genre: East Coast hip hop
- Length: 3:24
- Label: Penalty Recordings
- Songwriter(s): Lester Fernandez, Jerry Tineo, Gregory Mays, Darryl McDaniels, Joseph Simmons, Lawrence "Larry" Smith
- Producer(s): The Beatnuts

The Beatnuts singles chronology
"Ya Betta Believe It" (2003)	"Hot" (2004)	"Find Us" (2004)

"Hot" is the first single from Milk Me, a 2004 album by East Coast hip hop group The Beatnuts. It was released by Penalty Recordings as a 12 inch and CD single without any b-sides or additional tracks. The song is produced by The Beatnuts and features raps by Juju and Psycho Les, as well as ad libs sung by Greg Nice. The song's lyrics are braggadocios, hard-hitting and aggressive. The song's beat is characterized by a fast pounding horn loop and matching drums sampled from "Rock Box" by Run-D.M.C. The song also features live instrumentation provided by guitarist Eric Krasno and keyboardist Neal Evans.

Although "Hot" failed to chart, it received positive critical attention: Jason Birchmeier of Allmusic and Tom Doggett of RapReviews.com consider it a "standout song". Robert DeGracia of AllHipHop.com describes why the track stands out:

["Hot" is] a catchy Part Two to "Turn it Up" that serves as another 'Nuts and Greg Nice collabo; fully composed with their famed horns and staccato kicks, the track translates typical Beatnut trapeze and trampoline circus sounds into instant beat wizardry.

The popularity of "Hot" earned it a spot on the 2005 soundtrack for the film King's Ransom. In 2004, a HipHopSite.com exclusive remix of "Hot" was released in 7" format.

== Single track list ==
=== US 12" vinyl ===
==== A-Side ====
1. "Hot (Radio Edit)"
2. "Hot (Original Version)"

==== B-Side ====
1. "Hot (Instrumental)"
2. "Hot (Acapella)"

=== UK 12" vinyl ===
==== A-Side ====
1. "Hot (Original Mix")
2. "Hot (A Capella Mix)"

==== B-Side ====
1. "Hot (Radio Version)"
2. "Hot (Instrumental)"
