= Take It or Squeeze It =

Studio album by The Beatnuts
- Released: March 20, 2001
- Recorded: May 2000 – January 2001
- Studio: Planet Sound Studios (New York, NY); Chung King Studios
- Genre: Hip hop
- Length: 50:56
- Label: Loud; Epic
- Producer: The Beatnuts

The Beatnuts chronology
A Musical Massacre (1999)	Take It or Squeeze It (2001)	The Originators (2002)

Singles from Take It or Squeeze It
- 1. "No Escapin' This" Released: February 13, 2001; 2. "Let's Git Doe" Released: May 29, 2001

Professional ratings
Review scores
Source	Rating
AllMusic	3/5 stars
HipHopDX	4/5
NME	3.5/5 stars
RapReviews	8/10
Rolling Stone	4/5 stars
Robert Christgau	(neither)
Spin	7/10
The New Rolling Stone Album Guide	2.5/5 stars

Take It or Squeeze It is the fourth studio album by American hip hop duo The Beatnuts. It was released on March 20, 2001, via Loud Records and Epic Records. Recording sessions took place at Planet Sound Studios and Chung King Studios in New York. Produced by the Beatnuts, it features guest appearances from Marley Metal, Black Attack, Bloody Moon, Fatman Scoop, Greg Nice, Miss Loca, Problemz, Tony Touch, Triple Seis, Willie Stubz, Method Man, and former member Al' Tariq.

The album reached number 51 on the Billboard 200 and number 20 on the Top R&B/Hip-Hop Albums in the United States. It was supported with two singles: "No Escapin' This", which peaked at No. 56 on the Hot R&B/Hip-Hop Songs and No. 12 on the Hot Rap Songs, and "Let's Git Doe", which peaked at No. 87 on the Hot R&B/Hip-Hop Songs and No. 19 on the Hot Rap Songs. The album is now out of print.

== Track listing ==
No.	Title	Writer(s)	Length
1.	"Intro"		0:58
2.	"It's da Nuts"	Lester Fernandez; Jerry Tineo; Berntony Smalls	4:07
3.	"Prendelo (Light It Up)" (featuring Tony Touch)	L. Fernandez; Tineo; Joseph Hernandez	4:17
4.	"Contact" (featuring Marley Metal)	L. Fernandez; Tineo; Marley Fernandez	4:00
5.	"Yo Yo Yo" (featuring Greg Nice)	L. Fernandez; Tineo; Greg Mays	3:58
6.	"If It Ain't Gangsta" (featuring Black Attack)	L. Fernandez; Tineo; Sean Boston	3:43
7.	"No Escapin' This"	L. Fernandez; Tineo	4:16
8.	"Who's Comin' Wit da Shit Na" (featuring Willie Stubz)	L. Fernandez; Tineo; William Lora	3:25
9.	"Let's Git Doe" (featuring Fatman Scoop)	L. Fernandez; Tineo; Isaac Freeman	3:58
10.	"Hood Thang" (featuring Miss Loca)	L. Fernandez; Tineo; C. Nieves	5:08
11.	"Hammer Time" (featuring Problemz, Marley Metal and Bloody Moon)	L. Fernandez; Tineo; Smalls; Corey Bullock; M. Fernandez; J.P. Moronta	3:46
12.	"U Don't Want It" (featuring Triple Seis)	L. Fernandez; Tineo; Sammy Garcia	3:49
13.	"Mayonnaise"		1:59
14.	"Se Acabo (Remix)" (featuring Method Man)	L. Fernandez; Tineo; Clifford Smith	3:32
Total length:			50:56

== Personnel ==
- Lester "Psycho Les" Fernandez – vocals, producer, executive producer
- Jerry "JuJu" Tineo – vocals, producer, executive producer
- Berntony "Al' Tariq" Smalls – vocals (tracks: 2, 11)
- Sunni Fitch – additional vocals (track 2)
- Joseph "Tony Touch" Hernandez – vocals (track 3)
- Marley Fernandez – vocals (tracks: 4, 11)
- Chris Chandler – additional vocals (tracks: 4, 10)
- Lenny Underwood – additional keyboards (tracks: 4, 10, 12)
- Gregory "Greg Nice" Mays – vocals (track 5), additional vocals (track 7)
- Sean "Black Attack" Boston – vocals (track 6)
- M. "G-Wise" Herald – additional talkbox keyboards (track 4)
- Claudette Sierra – additional vocals (track 7)
- William "Willie Stubz" Lora – vocals (track 8)
- Angie – additional vocals (track 8)
- Isaac "Fatman Scoop" Freeman III – vocals (track 9)
- Zhana – additional vocals (track 9)
- C. "Miss Loca" Nieves – vocals (track 10)
- Corey "Problemz" Bullock – vocals (track 11)
- J. "Bloody Moon"/"Moonshine" Moronta – vocals (track 11)
- Sammy "Triple Seis" Garcia – vocals (track 12)
- Clifford "Method Man" Smith – vocals (track 14)
- Pablo Puente – recording (tracks: 1–13)
- Steve Sola – recording & mixing (track 14)
- Chris Conway – mixing (tracks: 1–8, 10–13)
- Doug Wilson – mixing (track 9)
- David Bett – art direction
- Kerry DeBruce – design
- Jonathan Mannion – photography

== Charts ==
Chart (2001)	Peak position
US Billboard 200	51
US Top R&B/Hip-Hop Albums (Billboard)	20
