= Paris sous les bombes =

Paris Sous Les Bombes

Studio album by Suprême NTM
- Released: 28 March 1995
- Recorded: 1995
- Genre: French rap Political hip hop
- Length: 68:00
- Label: Epic
- Producer: DJ Spank; DJ Max; DJ Clyde; Lucien Revolucien

Suprême NTM chronology
93... J'appuie sur la gâchette (1993)	Paris Sous Les Bombes (1995)	NTM Live 95' (1995)

Paris Sous Les Bombes (Paris Under The Bombs) is the third album by French hip hop group Suprême NTM.

== Critical reception ==
Professional ratings
Review scores
Source	Rating
AllMusic	4.5/5 stars

== Track listing ==
1. "Intro"
  - Contains samples from "American Tango" by Weather Report
2. "Plus jamais ça" – 4:46
3. "Tout n'est pas si facile" – 4:50
  - Contains samples from "The Sea Lion" by Grover Washington, Jr., "It's Your Love" by Ethel Beatty, and "Go Steta I" by Stetsasonic
4. "Come again (Pour que ça sonne funk)" – 4:05
  - Contains samples from "Fo-fi-fo" by Pieces of a Dream and "Chief Rocka" by Lords of the Underground
5. "Qu'est-ce qu'on attend ?" – 4:11
  - Contains samples from "Water Babies" by Miles Davis and "Raise the Roof" by Public Enemy
6. "Nouvelle École" – 4:02
  - Contains samples from "Mic Checka" by Das EFX
7. "Le Rêve" – 4:17
  - Contains samples from "Fightin' Fire With Fire" by The Bar-Kays
8. "Old Skool" – 3:05
  - Contains samples from "Vein Melter" by Herbie Hancock
9. "Intro (Paris sous les bombes)" – 0:41
10. "Paris sous les bombes" – 4:18
  - Contains samples from "My Melody" by Eric B. & Rakim
11. "Pass pass le oinj" – 4:08
12. "Qui paiera les dégâts? (DJ Clyde remix)" – 4:29
  - Contains samples from "Illegal Business" by Boogie Down Productions
  - Contains samples from "Tensity" by Cannonball Adderley
13. "Sista B. (intermède)" – 0:40
14. "Est-ce la vie ou moi ?" – 5:23
  - Contains samples from "Witch Doctor's Brew" by Magnum
15. "La Fièvre" – 4:05
  - Contains samples from "My Lady" by The Crusaders
16. "Popopop !!, freestyle" – 3:58
17. "Outro" – 2:15
  - Contains samples from "Theme from Trouble Man" by Marvin Gaye and "Straighten It Out" by Pete Rock & CL Smooth
18. "Come Again 2 (remix)" (bonus track) - 3:43
  - Featuring Big Red
19. "Saint-Denis Style/Affirmative Action (Remix)" (bonus track) - 4:04
  - Featuring Nas
