= The Piece Maker 3: Return of the 50 MC's =

Studio album by Tony Touch
- Released: July 9, 2013
- Recorded: 2012–13
- Genre: Hip hop
- Length: 1:02:06
- Labels: Touch; Red River
- Producers: A-Villa; Charli Brown Beatz; DJ Premier; Dready; Eminem; Erick Sermon; Just Blaze; Koolade; Lil' Fame; P.F. Cuttin'; Statik Selektah; The Beatnuts; Thirstin Howl III; Tony Touch

Tony Touch chronology
Reggaetony 2 (2007)	The Piece Maker 3: Return of the 50 MC's (2013)

The Piece Maker 3: Return of the 50 MC's is the sixth studio album by American hip hop DJ Tony Touch. It was released on July 9, 2013, via Touch Entertainment and Red River Entertainment.

Production was handled by The Beatnuts, A-Villa, Charli Brown Beatz, DJ Premier, Dready, Eminem, Erick Sermon, Just Blaze, Koolade, Lil' Fame, PF Cuttin, Statik Selektah, Thirstin Howl III, and Tony Touch himself, who also served as executive producer.

The album features guest appearances from Reek da Villian, Action Bronson, A.G., Al Joseph, Black Thought, B-Real, Bun B, Busta Rhymes, Crooked I, Eminem, Erick Sermon, Fat Joe, Ghostface Killah, Gob Goblin, Guilty Simpson, JD Era, J-Doe, Joell Ortiz, Kool G Rap, KRS-One, Kurupt, Liknuts (Tha Alkaholiks and The Beatnuts), Masta Ace, MC D-Story, Method Man & Redman, M.O.P., Noreaga, Papoose, Prodigy, Raekwon, Rah Digga, Roc Marciano, Royce da 5'9", RZA, Sadat X, Sean Price, Spit Gemz, Starvin B., Termanology, The Lox, Thirstin Howl III, Too Short, Twista, Uncle Murda, Willie the Kid, Xzibit and Angie Martinez.

== Critical response ==
Professional ratings
Review scores
Source	Rating
AllMusic	4/5 stars
HipHopDX	3/5
Exclaim!	7/10
RapReviews	4.5/10

Upon its release The Piece Maker 3: Return of the 50 MC's was met with mixed reviews from music critics. Bruce Smith of HipHopDX gave the album three out of five stars, saying "while Piecemaker Vol. 3 has its highlights, it's not without its flaws. At times, the production of the Beatnuts (which covers most of the project) can feel dated, as do some of the featured emcees. Piecemaker Vol. 3: Return of the 50 MCs is a mixtape in its truest form, for better or worse. While some will champion this as 'true Hip Hop,' the abundance of filler can't be ignored".

== Commercial performance ==
The album debuted at number 175 on the Billboard 200 chart, with first-week sales of 2,400 copies in the United States.

== Track listing ==
No.	Title	Producer(s)	Length
1.	"Touch and D-Stroy" (featuring MC D-Stroy)	DJ Premier	3:26
2.	"Ladies First Freestyle" (featuring Rah Digga & Angie Martinez)	Psycho Les	1:38
3.	"Double A" (featuring A.G. & Masta Ace)	Psycho Les	3:06
4.	"Hold That" (featuring Busta Rhymes, J-Doe, Reek da Villain & Roc Marciano)	Dready	4:29
5.	"You Know You Love This" (featuring M.O.P.)	Lil' Fame	2:32
6.	"V.I.P." (featuring Too Short, Xzibit & Kurupt)	Koolade	3:57
7.	"Hit This Freestyle" (featuring B-Real)	Psycho Les	1:03
8.	"Brooklyn's the Borough" (featuring Papoose & Uncle Murda)	Tony Touch	2:20
9.	"Random" (featuring Sean Price & Guilty Simpson)	P.F. Cuttin'	2:38
10.	"Thought Process" (featuring Black Thought)	Psycho Les	1:28
11.	"Bars" (featuring The Lox)	JuJu	2:26
12.	"World Premier" (featuring Liknuts)	Psycho Les	1:28
13.	"Unorthodox" (featuring Raekwon, JD Era, Ghostface Killah & RZA)	Tony Touch; Psycho Les; RZA (co.)	3:23
14.	"Symphony in H" (featuring Eminem)	Eminem	1:29
15.	"Bounce" (featuring Twista & Bun B)	Psycho Les	3:18
16.	"One Person Thirstin" (featuring Thirstin Howl III)	Thirstin Howl III	1:39
17.	"Power Cypha" (featuring Willie the Kid)	A-Villa	1:29
18.	"A Queen's Thing" (featuring Action Bronson & Kool G Rap)	Statik Selektah	2:50
19.	"Take It to the Bronx" (featuring KRS-One, Fat Joe & Sadat X)	Psycho Les	2:41
20.	"Aw Shux" (featuring Termanology)	Tony Touch	1:31
21.	"Street Corner Freestyle" (featuring Prodigy)	JuJu	1:21
22.	"Slaughter Session" (featuring Joell Ortiz, Royce da 5'9" & Crooked I)	Just Blaze	2:35
23.	"Let's Go" (featuring Redman, Method Man & Erick Sermon)	Erick Sermon	3:13
24.	"Questions" (featuring N.O.R.E., Al Joseph & Reek da Villian)	Charli Brown Beatz	3:16
25.	"GMI Freestyle" (featuring Gob Goblin, Starvin B & Spit Gemz)	Psycho Les	2:50
Total length:			1:02:06

== Charts ==
Chart (2013)	Peak position
US Billboard 200	175
US Top R&B/Hip-Hop Albums (Billboard)	26
US Independent Albums (Billboard)	3
