= Find Us =

Single by The Beatnuts featuring Akon

from the album Milk Me
- B-side: "Hot"
- Released: August 17, 2004
- Genre: Hip hop
- Length: 3:14
- Label: Penalty Recordings
- Songwriters: Lester Fernandez, Jerry Tineo, Aliuane Thiam
- Producer: The Beatnuts

The Beatnuts singles chronology
"Hot" (2004)	"Find Us" (2004)	"It's Nothing" (2004)

Akon singles chronology
"Locked Up" (2004)	"Find Us" (2004)	"Ghetto" (2004)

"Find Us" (sometimes subtitled "In the Back of the Club") is a song by East Coast hip hop group the Beatnuts. It was released as the second single from the album Milk Me as a CD single and 12-inch with "Hot" as its U.S. B-side and "It's Nothing" as its UK B-side. The song was produced by the Beatnuts and features raps by Juju and Psycho Les, as well as a chorus sung by Akon. The song's lyrics are both braggadocios and sexually explicit. Its beat is characterized by a stomp-and-clap percussion, as well as an intermittent whistling noise. The song also features live instrumentation provided by guitarist Eric Krasno and keyboardist Neal Evans.

"Find Us" was released to mainly positive critical reception: Jason Birchmeier of AllMusic considered it a "standout" song, while Tom Doggett of RapReviews.com added that it has a "marvelous minimalist beat" and "catchy hook." Low Key of MVRemix.com described "Find Us" as "a perfect club song for the summer" because of its "infectious handclaps." On a less positive note, Robert DeGracia of AllHipHop.com claimed: "['Find Us'] is a complete eye-crosser that makes listeners struggle to make sense of what's exactly rocking around the clock."

== Track listings ==
=== UK CD single ===
1. "Find Us (Radio)" (3:14)
2. "Find Us (Original)" (3:14)
3. "Find Us (Instrumental)" (3:14)
4. "It's Nothing (Radio)" (3:35)
5. "It's Nothing (Original)" (3:35)

=== US 12" vinyl ===
A-side

1. "Find Us (Radio Edit)"
2. "Find Us (Original Version)"
3. "Find Us (Instrumental Version)"

B-side

1. "Hot (Radio Edit)"
2. "Hot (Original Version)"
3. "Hot (Instrumental Version)"

=== UK 12" vinyl ===
A-side

1. "Find Us (In the Back of the Club) (Radio)"
2. "Find Us (In the Back of the Club) (Original)"
3. "Find Us (In the Back of the Club) (Instrumentaly)"

B-side

1. "It's Nothing (Radio)"
2. "It's Nothing (Original)"
3. "It's Nothing (Instrumental)"
