= Watch Out Now =

Single by The Beatnuts

from the album A Musical Massacre
- B-side: "Turn It Out"
- Released: May 4, 1999
- Recorded: 1998
- Genre: East Coast hip hop
- Length: 2:54
- Label: Relativity Records
- Songwriter(s): Lester Fernandez, Jerry Tineo, Fernando Arbex
- Producer(s): The Beatnuts

The Beatnuts singles chronology
"Here's a Drink" (1997)	"Watch Out Now" (1999)	"Se Acabo" (1999)

"Watch Out Now" is the first single from A Musical Massacre, a 1999 album by East Coast hip hop group The Beatnuts. It was released by Relativity Records in 1999 in both 12 inch and CD format. The song is produced by The Beatnuts and features materialistic raps by JuJu and Psycho Les, as well as a chorus performed by Yellaklaw. The track's fast-paced Latin beat samples "Hi-Jack" by Enoch Light.

"Watch Out Now" is the most commercially successful Beatnuts single; it reached #84 on the Billboard Hot 100 making it the second Beatnuts single to appear on the pop chart. It additionally appeared on the Rhythmic Top 40 chart and Canadian Singles Chart. Its popularity landed it on two Beatnuts hits compilations: Beatnuts Forever and Classic Nuts, Vol. 1. It can additionally be found on hip hop compilations including 1999's The Source Presents: Hip Hop Hits, Vol. 3, 2000's Louder Than Ever, Vol. 1 and 2004's Hip Hop Forever, Vol. 2. A "Watch Out Now" remix produced by Trouble Men was released as a single in France, but did not receive music video treatment as the original version did. Diane Martel directed the "Watch Out Now" music video. The song lyrics deal with the ability to "watch out" in the present time "now" and were considered lyrically very advanced for their time.

== Beat controversy ==
In 2002, Jennifer Lopez released "Jenny from the Block", a single that allegedly stole the Beatnuts' sample of "Hi-Jack" by Enoch Light (a song originally written by Spanish musician Fernando Arbex and was recorded by the group Barrabás for their 1974 album ¡Soltad a Barrabás!). The Beatnuts were angry that Lopez and her song's producers, The Trackmasters and Cory Rooney, were able to top The Beatnuts' commercial success with a purportedly unoriginal song. The Beatnuts expressed their displeasure with Lopez and her producers on the 2004 song "Confused Rappers" as well as through various interviews.

== Single track list ==
=== CD single ===
1. "Watch Out Now (Clean)" (2:54)
2. "Watch Out Now (Real)" (2:54)
3. "Watch Out Now (Instrumental)" (2:54)
4. "Turn It Out (Clean)" (4:34)
5. "Turn It Out (Real)" (4:36)
6. "Turn It Out (Instrumental)" (4:32)

=== US 12" vinyl ===
==== A-Side ====
1. "Watch Out Now (Clean)" (2:54)
2. "Watch Out Now (Real)" (2:54)
3. "Watch Out Now (Instrumental)" (2:54)

==== B-Side ====
1. "Turn It Out (Clean)" (4:31)
2. "Turn It Out (Real)" (4:31)
3. "Turn It Out (Instrumental)" (4:31)

=== Netherlands 12" vinyl ===
==== A-Side ====
1. "Watch Out Now (Real)" (2:54)

==== B-Side ====
1. "Watch Out Now (Instrumental)" (2:54)

=== France 12" vinyl ===
==== A-Side ====
1. "Watch Out Now (Trouble Men Rip-Off Remix)" (5:45)

==== B-Side ====
1. "Watch Out Now" (2:53)
2. "Watch Out Now (Trouble Men Rip-Off Edit)" (3:40)

== Charts ==
Chart (1999)	Peak position
US Billboard Hot 100	84
US Hot R&B/Hip-Hop Songs (Billboard)	29
US Hot Rap Songs (Billboard)	3

Chart (2004)	Peak position
UK Hip Hop/R&B (OCC)	20
UK Singles (OCC)	84
