= Milk Me =

Studio album by The Beatnuts
- Released: August 30, 2004 (UK); August 31, 2004 (US)
- Recorded: 2003–2004
- Studio: The Cutting Room (New York, NY)
- Genre: Hip hop
- Length: 52:08
- Label: Penalty; Rykodisc
- Producer: The Beatnuts

The Beatnuts chronology
The Originators (2002)	Milk Me (2004)

Singles from Milk Me
- 1. "Hot" Released: July 29, 2004; 2. "Find Us" Released: August 17, 2004; 3. "It's Nothing" Released: December 7, 2004

Professional ratings
Review scores
Source	Rating
AllMusic	3/5 stars
HipHopDX	3.5/5
RapReviews	7.5/10
The New Rolling Stone Album Guide	2/5 stars

Milk Me is the sixth studio album by American hip hop duo The Beatnuts. It was released on August 31, 2004 via Penalty Recordings/Rykodisc. Recording sessions took place at The Cutting Room in New York. Produced entirely by the Beatnuts, it featured guest appearances from Chris Chandler, Gab Goblin, A.G., Akon, Colion, Freeway, Greg Nice, Milano, Prince Whipper Whip, Rahzel, Tony Touch and Triple Seis.

It was critically received as a solid effort, but barely scraped the Billboard 200, peaking at number 196. In addition, none of its three singles—"Hot", "Find Us" and "It's Nothing"—were able to chart. The album's title was inspired by a phrase uttered by a man in "some porno". The album contains more live instruments—as opposed to sampling—than prior Beatnuts efforts.

== Track listing ==
No.	Title	Writer(s)	Length
1.	"Intro"	Lester Fernandez; Jerry Tineo	0:38
2.	"Hot" (featuring Greg Nice)	Fernandez; Tineo; Greg Mays; Joseph Simmons; Darryl McDaniels; Lawrence Smith	3:24
3.	"Buggin" (featuring Prince Whipper Whip)	Fernandez; Tineo; James Whipper; Hampton Hawes	4:03
4.	"It's Nothing" (featuring A.G. and Gab Goblin)	Fernandez; Tineo; Andre Barnes; G. Mendez	3:34
5.	"Rock n Roll Interlude"	Fernandez; Tineo	0:25
6.	"Find Us (In the Back of the Club)" (featuring Akon)	Fernandez; Tineo; Aliaune Thiam	3:14
7.	"U Nomsayin" (featuring Freeway)	Fernandez; Tineo; Leslie Pridgen	2:49
8.	"We Don't Give a Funk"	Fernandez; Tineo	2:41
9.	"Confused Rappers" (featuring Rahzel)	Fernandez; Tineo; Rozell Brown	4:04
10.	"All Night" (featuring Chris Chandler)	Fernandez; Tineo; Chris Chandler	3:29
11.	"Madness"	Fernandez; Tineo; Eric Krasno	3:20
12.	"We Getting Paper" (featuring Triple Seis and Colion)	Fernandez; Tineo; Sammy Garcia; D. Le Noir	4:10
13.	"Marching Band Interlude"		0:43
14.	"Uh Huh" (featuring Tony Touch and Gab Goblin)	Fernandez; Tineo; Joseph Hernandez; Mendez	3:34
15.	"Down" (featuring Milano)	Fernandez; Tineo; Rudy Morgan; Krasno; Melvin Griffin; Don Hatcher; Michael Grace	3:57
16.	"Take Your Pants Off Interlude"		0:19
17.	"Freak Off" (featuring Chris Chandler)	Fernandez; Tineo; Chandler; Neal Evans	3:07
18.	"Milk Me"		4:37
Total length:			52:08

== Personnel ==
- Lester "Psycho Les" Fernandez – vocals, producer, mixing, executive producer
- Jerry "JuJu" Tineo – vocals, producer, mixing, executive producer
- Eric Krasno – guitar (tracks: 2, 3, 6, 10–12, 15, 17), keyboards (tracks: 9–11), bass (tracks: 11–12)
- Neal Evans – keyboards (tracks: 2–4, 6, 17)
- Ryan Zoidis – saxophone (track 3)
- Rashawn Ross – trumpet (track 3)
- Anthony "Roc Raida" Williams – scratches (track 9)
- M. "G-Wise" Herald – talkbox (tracks: 11, 17)
- Gregory "Greg Nice" Mays – vocals (track 2)
- James "Prince Whipper Whip" Whipper II – vocals (track 3)
- Andre "A.G." Barnes – vocals (track 4)
- G. "Gab Goblin" Mendez – vocals (tracks: 4, 14)
- Aliaune "Akon" Thiam – vocals (track 6)
- Leslie "Freeway" Pridgen – vocals (track 7)
- Rahzel Brown – vocals (track 9)
- Chris Chandler – vocals (tracks: 10, 17)
- Eileen Cruz – additional vocals (track 10)
- Sammy "Triple Seis" Garcia – vocals (track 12)
- D. "Colion" Le Noir – vocals (track 12)
- Joseph "Tony Touch" Hernandez – vocals (track 14)
- Rudy "Milano" Morgan – vocals (track 15)
- Jeremy "Cochise" Ball – recording, mixing
- Michael Sarsfield – mastering
- Henley Halem – executive producer, A&R
- Neil Levine – executive producer
- Stacy Karp – coordinator
- Anita B. – art direction, design
- Mark Mann – photography
- Michelle Arnold – A&R
- Theo Sedlmayr – legal
- Lori Landrew – legal

== Charts ==
Chart performance for Milk Me
Chart (2004)	Peak position
French Albums (SNEP)	188
US Billboard 200	196
US Top R&B/Hip-Hop Albums (Billboard)	42
