= Do You Believe? (The Beatnuts song) =

Single by the Beatnuts

from the album Stone Crazy
- B-side: "Give Me Tha Ass"
- Released: March 11, 1997
- Recorded: 1996
- Genre: East Coast hip hop
- Length: 3:36
- Label: Relativity Records
- Songwriters: Lester Fernandez, Jerry Tineo
- Producer: The Beatnuts

The Beatnuts singles chronology
"Find That" (1996)	"Do You Believe?" (1997)	"Off the Books" (1997)

"Do You Believe?" is the second single from Stone Crazy, a 1997 album by East Coast hip hop group the Beatnuts. It was released by Relativity Records as a single with "Give Me Tha Ass" as its b-side in 1997. The song is produced by The Beatnuts and features raps by Juju and Psycho Les. Juju begins the song with a verse about his "ghetto mentality," while Psycho Les raps a verse about partying and making music. Juju's verse was later sampled in the song "Dos Factotum" by Louis Logic, while Psycho Les' verse was sampled in "Bottom Feeders" by Smut Peddlers. The song's mournful beat contains a samples "Fueron Tres Anos" by Chilean band Los Ángeles Negros.

"Do You Believe?" was the first single from Stone Crazy to chart; it reached number 27 on Hot Rap Singles and number 81 on Hot R&B/Hip-Hop Songs. Despite its relative commercial success, it is only featured on one of three Beatnuts hits compilations: 1999's World Famous Classics.

== Single track list ==
=== CD single ===
1. "Do You Believe? (Clean)" (3:36)
2. "Do You Believe? (Street)" (3:27)
3. "Do You Believe? (Instrumental)" (3:42)
4. "Do You Believe? (Acapella)" (3:50)
5. "Give Me Tha Ass (Dirty)" (3:42)
6. "Give Me Tha Ass (Street)" (3:52)
7. "Give Me Tha Ass (Instrumental)" (3:49)
8. "Give Me Tha Ass (Acapella)" (3:31)
9. "Bonus Beats" (0:44)

=== 12" vinyl b/w "Give Me Tha Ass" ===
==== A-Side ====
1. "Do You Believe? (Clean)" (3:36)
2. "Do You Believe? (Street)" (3:27)
3. "Do You Believe? (Instrumental)" (3:42)
4. "Do You Believe? (Acapella)" (3:50)

==== B-Side ====
1. "Give Me Tha Ass" (Clean) (3:42)
2. "Give Me Tha Ass" (Street) (3:52)
3. "Give Me Tha Ass" (Instrumental) (3:49)
4. "Give Me Tha Ass" (Acapella) (3:31)
5. "Bonus Beats" (0:44)
