= The Piece Maker =

Studio album by Tony Touch
- Released: April 18, 2000
- Recorded: 1999–2000
- Genre: Hip hop
- Length: 69:30
- Labels: Touch; Tommy Boy
- Producers: Tony Touch, The Alchemist, Psycho Les, 8-Off, DJ Premier, DJ Muggs, DJ Scratch, True Master, Maseo, Showbiz

Tony Touch chronology
The Piece Maker (2000)	The Last of the Pro Ricans (2002)

The Piece Maker is the debut studio album by American hip hop DJ Tony Touch, released on April 18, 2000, on Tony Touch's Touch Entertainment and Tommy Boy Entertainment.

== Background ==
Tony Touch had already made a name for himself as one of New York City's most prominent mixtape DJs, releasing hundreds of mixtapes since the early 1990s. By 2000, Tony Touch signed a deal with Tommy Boy to release his first album to not only include his DJ work and some production, but his own rhymes as well. In addition to himself, the album featured production from the likes of Gang Starr's DJ Premier, Cypress Hill's DJ Muggs, and the Alchemist, among several others. The album also included several guest artists on it including Gang Starr, Cypress Hill, and Wu-Tang Clan. In addition, two singles were released from the album "I Wonder Why? (He's the Greatest DJ)" and "The Return of the Diaz Bros.", both of which found minor chart success on the Billboard R&B charts. The Piece Maker proved popular enough that Tony Touch released a sequel in 2004 titled The Piece Maker 2.

== Reception ==
Professional ratings
Review scores
Source	Rating
AllMusic	2.5/5 stars
RapReviews	9/10

Michael Gallucci of AllMusic gave the album 2.5 out of a possible five stars, proclaiming "DJ Touch has assembled an impressive list of guests", while also stating the album was "marred by homophobic proclamations and played-out clichés". Steve "Flash" Juon of RapReviews gave the album a much more favorable review. He gave the album a 9 out 10 and in his review he stated "Tony Touch keeps his mic time both minimal and unannoying and gives a VERY solid selection of hip-hop's best artists time to shine on fat new joints. If this was ANY movie's soundtrack, it would easily outgross the film. High marks to Touch for reviving a field which lesser contemporaries like DJ Clue nearly killed with boring CDs."

The album was mildly successful commercially. It spent 9 weeks on the Billboard 200, peaking at No. 57, but it achieved greater success on the Top R&B/Hip-Hop Albums, spending 44 weeks on the chart and peaking at No. 19. As of June 2005, the album has sold over 250,000 copies.

== Track listing ==
No.	Title	Producer	Length
1.	"Toca's Intro" (featuring Baby Touch, Bonz Malone and Pedro Albizu Campos)	Psycho Les	2:52
2.	"The Piece Maker" (featuring Gang Starr)	DJ Premier	2:43
3.	"Set It on Fire" (featuring Flipmode Squad)	DJ Shok	4:24
4.	"U Know the Rules (Mi Vida Loca)" (featuring Cypress Hill)	DJ Muggs	3:52
5.	"The Abduction" (featuring Wu-Tang Clan)	True Master	3:46
6.	"Likwit Rhyming" (featuring Tash, Defari and Xzibit)	DJ Scratch	3:12
7.	"Royce the 5'9" (interlude) (featuring Royce da 5'9")	Tony Touch	1:01
8.	"The Return of the Diaz Bros." (featuring Doo Wop and Pain in da Ass)	Tony Touch	3:25
9.	"No, No, No" (featuring Heltah Skeltah and Starang Wondah)	Tony Touch	4:21
10.	"I Wonder Why? (He's the Greatest DJ)" (featuring Total)	Tony Touch	4:03
11.	"Basics" (featuring Prodigy)	The Alchemist	2:59
12.	"Pit Fight" (featuring Greg Nice and Psycho Les)	Psycho Les	4:07
13.	"What's That? (Que Eso?)" (featuring De La Soul and Mos Def)	Maseo	4:14
14.	"The Club" (featuring D.I.T.C., Kid Capri and Party Arty)	Showbiz	4:09
15.	"Cormega (skit)" (featuring Cormega)	The Alchemist	1:56
16.	"The Foundation" (featuring Big Pun, Reif-Hustle and Sunkiss)	8-Off	3:52
17.	"Get Back" (featuring Proof, Eminem & Bizarre of D12)	The Alchemist	3:38
18.	"Adolf "8-Off" Agahar" (featuring 8-Off)	8-Off	2:02
19.	"Class of 87" (featuring Big Daddy Kane, KRS-One and Kool G Rap)	8-Off	3:29
20.	"P.R. All-Stars" (featuring Don Chezina, Daddy Yankee, Ivy Queen, Mexicano 777 and Rey Pirin)	Tony Touch	5:14
21.	"Borinquen Outro" (featuring Nixiwei and Waribonex)	Tony Touch	0:45
Total length:			69:30

== Charts ==
Chart (2000)	Peak position
US Billboard 200	57
US Top R&B/Hip-Hop Albums (Billboard)	19
