= The Originators =

Studio album by The Beatnuts
- Released: July 23, 2002
- Recorded: 2001–02
- Studios: Soho Music Studios (New York, NY); Big Fat Suite (New York, NY)
- Genre: Hip hop
- Length: 45:43
- Label: Landspeed Records
- Producers: The Beatnuts; Large Professor

The Beatnuts chronology
Take It or Squeeze It (2001)	The Originators (2002)	Milk Me (2004)

Singles from The Originators
- 1. "Buying out the Bar" Released: November 19, 2002; 2. "Work That Pole" Released: 2002; 3. "Ya Betta Believe It" Released: April 28, 2003

Professional ratings
Review scores
Source	Rating
AllMusic	3/5 stars
RapReviews	8/10
The New Rolling Stone Album Guide	2/5 stars

The Originators is the fifth studio album by American hip hop duo The Beatnuts. It was released on July 23, 2002, via Landspeed Records. Recording sessions took place at Soho Studios and The Big Fat Suite in New York. Production was handled entirely by the Beatnuts, except for one song, "Originate", which was produced by member JuJu and Large Professor. It features guest appearances from Problemz, Amaretta, Chris Chandler, Cormega, El Gant, Ill Bill, Large Professor, Marley Metal, Tony Touch, Triple Seis and former member Al' Tariq.

Likely because of its indie record label, it failed to reach the Billboard 200 like the Beatnuts' prior four full-length albums, but managed to appear on the Independent Albums chart. Its beats and party vibe were well received, but its lyrics were criticized for lacking substance in the same vein as prior releases. Four singles were released in promotion of The Originators, but none of them charted.

== Track listing ==
No.	Title	Writer(s)	Producer(s)	Length
1.	"Intro"			1:29
2.	"Bring the Funk Back"	Lester Fernandez; Jerry Tineo	The Beatnuts	3:06
3.	"Yae Yo" (featuring Ill Bill and Problemz)	L. Fernandez; Tineo; William Braunstein; Corey Bullock	The Beatnuts	3:46
4.	"Drunk Skit"			0:11
5.	"Buying out the Bar" (featuring Chris Chandler)	L. Fernandez; Tineo	The Beatnuts	3:21
6.	"Work That Pole" (featuring Tony Touch)	L. Fernandez; Tineo; Joseph Hernandez	The Beatnuts	3:59
7.	"Originate" (featuring Large Professor)	L. Fernandez; Tineo; William Paul Mitchell	Junkyard JuJu; Large Professor	3:51
8.	"My Music" (featuring Armaretta and Problemz)	L. Fernandez; E. Hernandez; Bullock	The Beatnuts	3:09
9.	"U Crazy" (featuring Cormega)	L. Fernandez; Tineo; Cory McKay	The Beatnuts	3:40
10.	"Ya Betta Believe It"	L. Fernandez; Tineo	The Beatnuts	3:42
11.	"Routine"	L. Fernandez; Tineo	The Beatnuts	3:56
12.	"Bionic" (featuring El Gant and Al Tariq)	L. Fernandez; Berntony Smalls; Joshua Adam Gent	The Beatnuts	3:20
13.	"Becks 'N Branson" (featuring Triple Seis and Marley Metal)	L. Fernandez; Tineo; Sammy Garcia; Marley Fernandez	The Beatnuts	5:17
14.	"Back 2 Back"	L. Fernandez	The Beatnuts	2:56
Total length:				45:43

== Personnel ==
- Lester "Psycho Les" Fernandez – vocals, producer (tracks: 2, 3, 5, 6, 8–14), mixing (tracks: 2, 3, 5–14), executive producer
- Jerry "JuJu" Tineo – vocals, producer & mixing (tracks: 2, 3, 5–14), executive producer
- Berntony "Al' Tariq" Smalls – vocals (track 12)
- Corey "Problemz" Bullock – vocals (tracks: 3, 8)
- William "Ill Bill" Braunstein – vocals (track 3)
- Chris Chandler – vocals (track 5), additional vocals (tracks: 6, 10)
- Joseph "Tony Touch" Hernandez – vocals (track 6)
- Big Ang – additional vocals (track 6)
- William Paul "Large Professor" Mitchell – vocals & producer (track 7)
- E. "Armaretta" Hernandez – vocals (track 8)
- Cory "Cormega" McKay – vocals (track 9)
- Joshua Adam "El Gant" Gent – vocals (track 12)
- Sammy "Triple Seis" Garcia – vocals (track 13)
- Marley Fernandez – vocals (track 13)
- Chris Conway – recording (tracks: 2, 3, 5, 7, 11, 13, 14), mixing (tracks: 2, 3, 5, 7–11, 13, 14)
- Ryan West – recording (tracks: 2, 5, 6, 8–12), mixing (tracks: 6, 12)
- Henley Halem – co-executive producer
- Trevor "Karma" Gendron – design

== Charts ==
Chart (2002)	Peak position
US Top R&B/Hip-Hop Albums (Billboard)	57
