= Hydra Beats, Vol. 5 =

Studio album by The Beatnuts
- Released: July 7, 1997
- Genre: Hip hop
- Label: Hydra Entertainment
- Producer: The Beatnuts Reviews =

The Beatnuts chronology
Stone Crazy (1997)	Hydra Beats, Vol. 5 (1997)	Remix EP: The Spot (1998)

Hydra Beats, Vol. 5 is an instrumental album by hip hop group and production duo The Beatnuts. It was released on July 7, 1997, by Hydra Entertainment. It is the fifth of 14 instrumental vinyl albums released by Hydra Entertainment. It contains 12 songs, all produced by The Beatnuts. No singles were released in promotion of this album.

== Track listing ==
1. "Relax Yourself" (2:58)
2. "Throw Your Hands Up" (2:41)
3. "Purse Snatcher" (2:47)
4. "The Chase" (3:31)
5. "Out of State Case" (3:06)
6. "I Can't Relate" (2:42)
7. "Bum Rush" (2:13)
8. "Highly Recognized" (3:12)
9. "Homo Victim" (2:58)
10. "Gonna Fly" (2:31)
11. "Jungle Gook" (2:36)
12. "Crab Niggas" (1:38)
