= Props Over Here =

Single by The Beatnuts

from the album The Beatnuts: Street Level
- B-side: "Yeah You Get Props"
- Released: 1994
- Genre: East Coast hip hop
- Length: 4:00
- Label: Relativity Records; Violator
- Songwriter(s): Lester Fernandez, Bertony Smalls, Jerry Tineo
- Producer(s): The Beatnuts

The Beatnuts singles chronology
"No Equal" (1993)	"Props Over Here" (1994)	"Hit Me with That" (1994)

"Props Over Here" is the first single from The Beatnuts: Street Level, a 1994 album by East Coast hip hop group The Beatnuts. It was released by Relativity Records as a single with "Yeah You Get Props" as its b-side in 1994. The song is produced by The Beatnuts and features raps by JuJu, Psycho Les and Fashion. The lyrics are not as boastful as other Beatnuts songs, but are instead a hopeful demand to be considered good. "Props Over Here" contains a slow upbeat jazz-inspired instrumental that samples "Wee Tina" by Donald Byrd & Booker Little and "The Bridge" by MC Shan. Lenny Underwood plays keyboards on the song.

Matt Jost of RapReviews.com explains that the song is well-suited as a lead single because its "rich bassline" is made for "mass consumption. Despite these "props" and the song's Abraham L. Lim-directed music video, "Props Over Here" did not make it onto the Billboard Hot 100, but instead reached #39 on the Hot Rap Singles chart. The song is nonetheless one of The Beatnuts' best known songs. It is sampled on Don Scavone's song "The Force." It can be found on two Beatnuts hits compilations, World Famous Classics and Classic Nuts, Vol. 1. A remix can be found on Remix EP: The Spot.

== Single track list ==
=== A-Side ===
1. "Props Over Here (Clean Edit)" (4:04)
2. "Props Over Here (PD/MD Edit)" (4:04)
3. "Props Over Here (LP Version)" (4:04)

=== B-Side ===
1. "Yeah You Get Props (Rough Mix)" (3:45)
2. "Props Over Here (Instrumental)" (4:04)
3. "Props Over Here (Acapella)" (3:45)

== Charts ==
Chart (1994)	Peak position
US Dance Singles Sales (Billboard)	14
US Hot Rap Singles (Billboard)	39
