= 5 Deadly Venoms of Brooklyn =

Mixtape by P.F. Cuttin' / Mister Cee / Tony Touch / DJ Premier / Evil Dee
- Released: 1997
- Recorded: 1997
- Genre: Hip hop
- Label: Tape Kingz

5 Deadly Venoms of Brooklyn is a mixtape created by five New York City DJs, P.F. Cuttin', Mister Cee, Tony Touch, DJ Premier and Evil Dee. The mixtape was recorded in 1997 and released by Tape Kingz on cassette tape. The name of the album is a reference to a well-known kung-fu movie Five Deadly Venoms.

The album consists of mixed tracks of Dr. Dre, B-Real, Busta Rhymes, KRS-One, Kool G Rap, Mobb Deep, Notorious B.I.G., Sunz Of Man, Jeru The Damaja and many more. 5 Deadly Venoms of Brooklyn is considered one of the greatest hip-hop mixtapes ever created. In the book Ego Trip's Big Books of Rap Lists, it was ranked on "Top 10 Greatest Mixtapes Ever" list.

== Track list ==
Mixed By The Lizard a.k.a. P.F. Cuttin':

1. P.F. Cuttin' – "5 Deadly Venoms Of Brooklyn - Intro"
2. Verbal Hoods – "I'll Be Damned"
3. Dr. Dre & B-Real – "Puppet Master"
4. Breez Evahflowin' – "Forsaken"
5. Busta Rhymes & Q-Tip – "Wild Hot"
6. Camp Lo – "Say Word"
7. The Dutchmin – "Surrounded"
8. Powerule – "Bright Lights, Big City"

Mixed By The Toad a.k.a. Mister Cee:

1. Zhané – "Request Line (Mister Cee Blend)"
2. KRS-One – "Raptures Delight"
3. Yvette Michele – "Not Feelin' You (Mister Cee Blend)"
4. The Veterans – "The Medicine"
5. Notorious B.I.G. – "Hypnotize"
6. Frankie Cutlass, Kool G Rap, Mobb Deep & M.O.P. – "Know The Game"
7. Mobb Deep – "Young Luv"

Mixed By The Snake a.k.a. Tony Touch:

1. Tony Touch – "Deadly Freestyle"
2. Steele Kat One & Lil' Noc – "Freestyle"
3. Freddie Foxxx – "Freestyle"
4. Sunz Of Man & Makeeba – "Freestyle"
5. Guru – "Freestyle"
6. Channel Live & Benny Boom – "Freestyle"
7. Jeru The Damaja & Lil' Dap – "Freestyle"

Mixed By The Scorpion a.k.a. DJ Premier:

1. Grand Wizard Theodore & Kevie Kev Rockwell – "Military Cut"
2. Busy Bee vs. Kool Moe Dee – "Live At The Harlem World"
3. Double Trouble – "Live At The Amphitheater L.E.S."
4. The Cold Crush Brothers – "It's Us"
5. T La Rock – "It's Yours"
6. LL Cool J – "I Need A Beat (Jazzy Mix 1984)"
7. Malcolm McLaren & The World's Famous Supreme Team – "Buffalo Gals"
8. MC Lyte – "I Cram To Understand"
9. Divine Force Crew – "Holy War"
10. DJ Premier – "Ending Interlude"

Mixed By The Centipede a.k.a. Evil Dee:

1. Black Skavengers – "Poison Pill"
2. Jeru the Damaja – "Me Or The Papes"
3. M.O.P. – "Downtown Swinga"
4. Krumb Snatcha – "Gettin' Closer To God"
5. Shamus & Flu – "Tight Team"
6. AK Skills – "East To West"
7. Shadez Of Brooklyn – "Calm Under Pressure"
