= No Equal =

Single by The Beatnuts

from the album Intoxicated Demons: The EP
- B-side: "Psycho Dwarf"
- Released: 1993
- Genre: East Coast hip hop
- Length: 4:07
- Label: Relativity Records; Violator
- Songwriter(s): Lester Fernandez, Berntony DeVore Smalls, Jerry Tineo
- Producer(s): The Beatnuts

The Beatnuts singles chronology
"Reign of the Tec" (1993)	"No Equal" (1993)	"Props Over Here" (1994)

"No Equal" is the second single by East Coast hip hop group The Beatnuts. It was released by Relativity Records as a single before being placed on The Beatnuts' debut EP Intoxicated Demons: The EP. The song is produced by The Beatnuts and features raps by Juju, Psycho Les and Fashion. It contains a spacy beat that features a prominent xylophone and brass section sampled from "Ain't No Sunshine" by Willis Jackson, "The Confined Few" by Irvin Booker & Booker Little and "Ain't No Sunshine" by Harlem Underground Band. It additionally samples Q-Tip's vocals from "Jazz (We've Got) (Re-Recording)" by A Tribe Called Quest and Rakim's vocals from "My Melody" by Eric B. & Rakim. DJ Fatboy of RapReviews.com explains that the song is carried by its "spanish(sic) tinged jazzy" beat, not its unjustifiably braggadocios lyrics.

Despite the release of a "No Equal" music video, the song failed to chart. It can be found on two Beatnuts hits compilations, World Famous Classics and Beatnuts Forever, as well as the hip hop compilation Hip Hop Don't Stop (The Greatest). A remix can be found on The Spot.

== Single track list ==
=== A-Side ===
1. "No Equal (Clean Version)" (4:03)
2. "No Equal (LP Version)" (4:05)
3. "No Equal (Instrumental)" (4:11)

=== B-Side ===
1. "Psycho Dwarf (Clean Version)" (3:38)
2. "Psycho Dwarf (LP Version)" (3:40)
3. "Psycho Dwarf (Instrumental)" (3:46)
