= Reign of the Tec =

Single by The Beatnuts

from the album Intoxicated Demons: The EP
- Released: March 23rd, 1993
- Recorded: 1992
- Genre: East Coast hip hop
- Length: 3:21
- Label: Relativity Records; Violator
- Songwriters: Lester Fernandez, Jerry Tineo
- Producer: The Beatnuts

The Beatnuts singles chronology
"Reign of the Tec" (1993)	"No Equal" (1993)

"Reign of the Tec" is the debut single by East Coast hip hop group The Beatnuts. It was released by Relativity Records on March 23, 1993, before being placed on The Beatnuts' debut EP Intoxicated Demons: The EP. The song is produced by The Beatnuts and features raps by Juju and Psycho Les. It contains a beat that samples a guitar riff from "Wicked World" by metal band Black Sabbath. The song and its accompanying music video directed by David Perez Shadi are cited as "getting The Beatnuts noticed". DJ Fatboy of RapReviews.com lists its notable aspects: an"infectious chorus," a vocal sample from Brand Nubian's "Punks Jump Up to Get Beat Down (Remix)," and humorous lyrics.

"Reign of the Tec" was the only single from Intoxicated Demons that charted—it reached #50 on the Hot Rap Singles chart—and is now considered a staple Beatnuts classic. It is found on all three greatest hits compilations by The Beatnuts. Del tha Funkee Homosapien sampled lyrics from Juju's verse on his 1993 song "Wack M.C.'s".

== Single track listing ==
A-side

1. "Reign of the Tec (Radio Edit)" (3:39)
2. "Reign of the Tec (EP Version)" (3:39)

B-side

1. "Reign of the Tec" (Instrumental) (5:14)
