= Suprême NTM =

French hip hop band

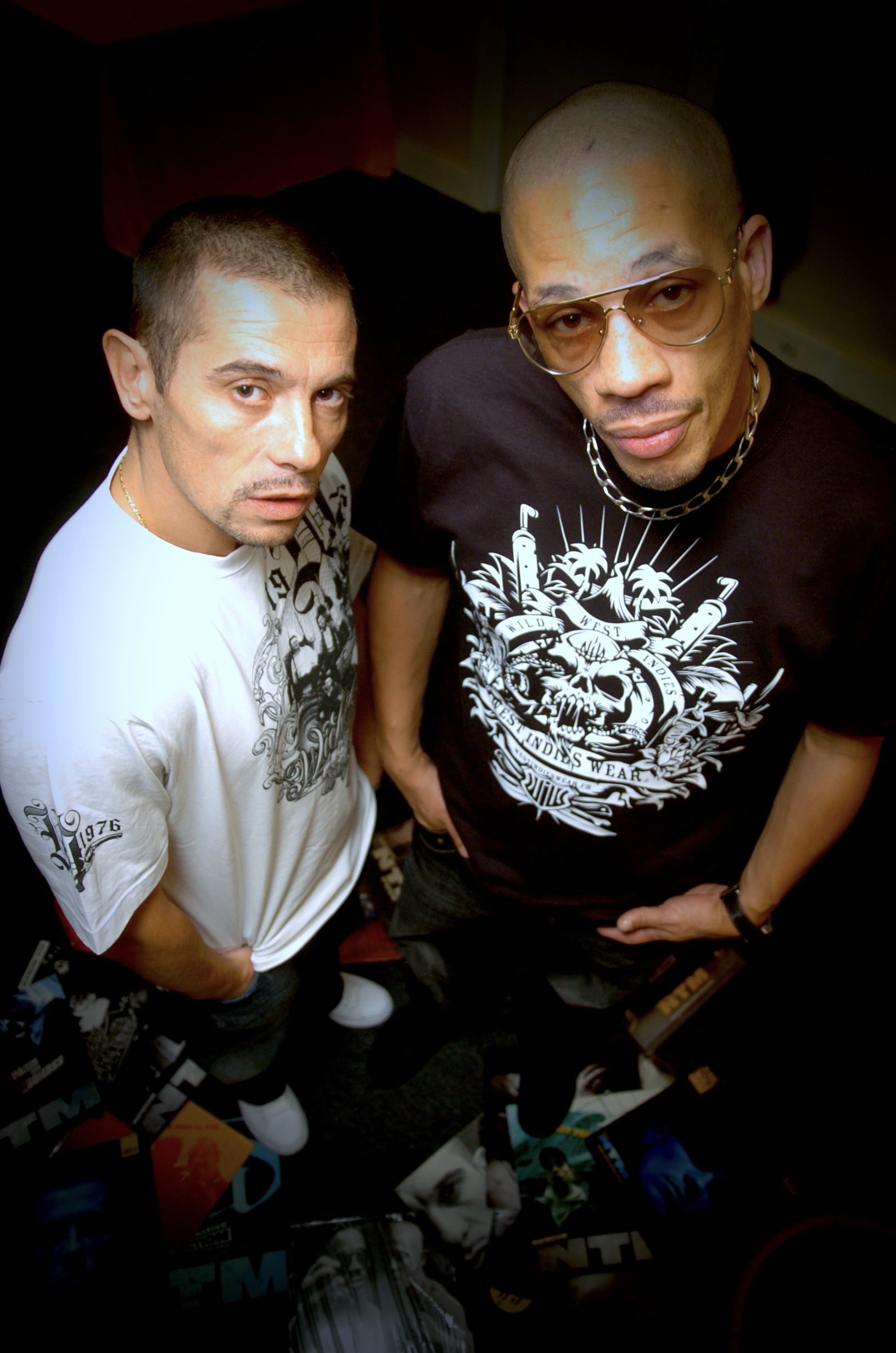
- Kool Shen (left) and JoeyStarr in 2008

Background information
- Origin: Saint-Denis, Seine-Saint-Denis, Île-de-France, France
- Genres: Hip hop; hardcore hip-hop
- Years active: 1989–2001, 2008–present
- Label: Epic Records
- Members: Kool Shen; JoeyStarr
- Website: Official website

Suprême NTM (French pronunciation: [sypʁɛm ɛn te ʔɛm]), or simply NTM, is a French hip hop band formed in 1989 in Saint-Denis, Île-de-France. The band comprises rappers JoeyStarr and Kool Shen. Their 6 albums were released by Sony Music.

The group takes its name from the French slang "NTM", an initialism for "Nique Ta Mère" ("Fuck Your Mother"; the vulgar slang word "niquer" is derived from North African Sabir "i nik" ("he makes love"), which in turn comes from the Arabic "nak" (same meaning)). Suprême NTM is known for representing the perspective of minority groups in underprivileged, "invisible" neighborhoods around Paris. Through the use of politically conscious lyrics, NTM raises awareness of police brutality, racist legislation, and youth violence, culminating in a series of highly publicized legal battles with the French authorities. Their musical style is predominantly hardcore rap, although later albums include funk, soul and reggae influences.

The group is outspokenly critical of racism and class inequality in French society, and while their earlier music is violent, some of their later work, such as "Pose ton Gun" ("Put down your Gun"), is explicitly anti-violent.

In 1998, the group released its last album of original material under the NTM moniker, as both Joey Starr and Kool Shen started their own labels, promoting new bands and branching out in other fields such as the clothing industry (2High is Kool Shen's brand, Com-8 is Joey Starr's).

While officially the band still exists, and its well-known name was used in 2001 to promote a 'duel' album pitting the two labels' artists against each other, Kool Shen was quoted in 2004 saying "on a fini avec NTM en 98" ("We finished with NTM in 1998").

The group is known for its gritty, dark and sometimes violent lyrics, as well as for the contrast between the two rappers' styles. While Joey Starr (also known as Jaguar Gorgonne and Double-R) has a relatively slow flow, aggressive lyrics and a deep, booming voice (which he sometimes uses to yell such as in "Pose ton Gun"), Kool Shen has a funkier flow as well as witty and rather melancholic lyrics.

== Conflicts with authority ==
Everything started in summer 1983 where Joey Starr and Kool Shen were watching American hip hop dancers break it down in Paris. Joey Starr and Kool Shen started learning how to dance and defined their own style, smurf for Joey Starr and break dancing for Kool Shen. They then started painting graffiti, and were part of a graffiti writer group that was composed of DRC, TCG, 93 MCs and Joey and Kool Shen. After this period Joey and Kool got into the rapping industry where they were publicly heard on the radio for the first time in 1989 on radio Nova. They used illegally the IRCAM recording studio in 1989 that ended by a violent altercation with its Director Pierre Boulez. Understanding the background of this group facilitates understanding the message behind its harsh lyrics. NTM is considered to be a hardcore rap group; the themes in their songs are mainly about social inequality and racism where Jean-Marie Le Pen is often used as a racist figure in their songs. Some political figures proclaim that there are too many immigrants in France as a 1991 survey indicated that 71% of the French population said that there were too many Arabs in France. Most French hip hop groups are represented by the youth, and this generation is the second generation of those immigrants and were born on French soil.

The 1993 release 1993… J'appuie sur la Gâchette ("1993… I'm Pulling the Trigger") contained a track with the same name, about suicide, which was censored on most French TV channels (despite not creating any scandal, unlike "La Police") and a track "Police" that featured violent criticism of the police. The police responded to this by taking NTM to court. The court decided in favor of NTM. However, many French radio stations decided to boycott the group's music.

A second encounter with the police occurred in 1995 when the group made further comments critical of the French police during a live concert that allegedly included advocating violence against the police. The group was again taken to court, and this time they were sentenced, initially to six months imprisonment, a sentence that was shortened to two months imprisonment and a 50'000 Franc fine on appeal.

Joey Starr was later convicted of and imprisoned for charges unrelated to his musical career: assaulting a flight attendant in November 1998, and then assaulting his ex-girlfriend in 1999, shortly after his release.

Starr tried creating a new "watered down" public image in 2002, releasing a solo single which was not received well by critics, as it didn't have the trademark "energy" of the past NTM releases. The same year, his public image suffered further when he was filmed brutalizing a pet monkey in a documentary.

In June 2009, Joeystarr was sentenced to six months in prison for assaulting three people and demolishing their car with an axe. He claims he was under the influence of drugs and admits he overreacted.

== NTM live ==
NTM began to be known not only for their hard but conscious lyrics but for their stage presence during live events in the 1990s.

Already in their first big event in 1992 at the Zenith NTM came with a large number of dancers, back up singers, and slogans like "fuck the police" and lyrics like "Le monde de demain" which powerfully demanded change in modern society. Police surrounded the concert and several riots then ensued.

One of their most impressive songs played live was "Qu'est ce qu'on attend...": "What are we waiting for.. to set everything on fire" in which Joey Starr finishes the song with his lion-like voice by a now famous "dorénavant la rue ne pardonne plus" meaning "henceforth the street no longer forgives." This song was accused among others by some politicians to have contributed in unleashing the social riots that France has known in October 2005

In January 2008, a newspaper (Les Inrockuptibles) has announced the possible return of NTM on stage. Both singers have indeed said, that even if they have no intention of reforming (they haven't spoken for eight years now), a live event is not out of the question. Many interviews done this last month caused huge buzz in France and many now think that the live event might be held at the Stade de France (France's biggest stadium), where NTM was supposed to do a concert in 1999 but was canceled since the group already had been separated.

It was confirmed on the 12 March 2008, that NTM would be back for three concerts at Bercy. Tickets went on sale on the 15 of March and sold out in 30 minutes.

== Collaborations ==
NTM has collaborated with a number of international artists. NTM collaborates with Nas for a song called Affirmative Action. This is a cross continental, cross cultural attack of the racially stratified status quo. (It is one of many trans-atlantic collaborations within the hip hop world. MC Solaar, IAM, Afro Jazz, Monsieur R, Booba, Assassin, and other French rappers also collaborated with famous American rappers). Nas espouses messages of the corrupt nature of governmental agencies saying, "Feds cost me 2 mil to get the system off me". This collaboration played an undeniable role in the elevation of NTM to the international stage, and in their ability to spread awareness of "The condition of the black minority in France today and the bankruptcy of the African continent [which is] by no means a reflection of the continents worth and potential". Both contexts/rappers espouse the organization of a Mafiaesque counter governmental organization meant to empower the lower classes of the US and France in this song. NTM collaborated with Lord Kossity from Martinique to create a track that mixed rap with dancehall. The song, titled "Ma Benz" appeared on NTM's 1998 self-titled album. NTM's established success helped to boost Lord Kossity's popularity.

== Discography ==
- 1991 : Authentik
- 1993 : 1993… J'Appuie Sur La Gâchette
- 1995 : Paris Sous Les Bombes
- 1998 : Suprême NTM
- 2000 : Live (1991–1998)
- 2000 : NTM Le Clash - BOSS Vs IV My People
- 2007 : Supreme NTM - Best Of 2007
- 2009 : On est encore là - Live Bercy 2008

== See also ==
- List of French hip hop artists
