= The Beatnuts: Street Level =

The Beatnuts

Studio album by the Beatnuts
- Released: June 21, 1994
- Recorded: May 1993 – March 1994
- Studios: LGK (Leonia, NJ); Soundtrack (New York, NY); Greene St.
- Genre: Hip hop
- Length: 58:21
- Labels: Violator; Relativity
- Producers: The Beatnuts; Lucien; V.I.C.

The Beatnuts chronology
Intoxicated Demons: The EP (1993)	The Beatnuts (1994)	Stone Crazy (1997)

Singles from The Beatnuts
- 1. "Props Over Here" Released: 1994; 2. "Hit Me with That" Released: 1994; 3. "Hellraiser" Released: 1994

The Beatnuts is the self-titled full-length debut album by American hip hop trio the Beatnuts. It was released on June 21, 1994, via Violator/Relativity Records. The recording sessions took place at LGK Studios in Leonia, New Jersey, at Soundtrack Studios and Greene St. Recording in New York. The album was produced by the Beatnuts and Lucien. It features guest appearances from Gab Gotcha of Triflicts, Grand Puba and Miss Jones. The album reached number 182 on the Billboard 200 and number 28 on the Top R&B/Hip Hop Albums in the United States. Two singles were released: "Props Over Here", which peaked at number 39 on the US Hot Rap Singles, and "Hit Me with That". The music video for "Props Over Here" was directed by Abraham Lincoln Lim.

The album's title is sometimes mistakenly referred to as Street Level, because those words appear on the album cover; however, the words "Street Level" do not appear anywhere else on the CD (in the liner notes or on the CD spine label). The song "Psycho Dwarf" previously appeared on the 1993 Intoxicated Demons: The EP. It is the last Beatnuts album to include Fashion, who left the group to pursue a solo career under the alias Al' Tariq.

== Critical reception ==
Professional ratings
Review scores
Source	Rating
AllMusic	3.5/5 stars
Entertainment Weekly	B
RapReviews	8/10
(The New) Rolling Stone Album Guide	2.5/5 stars
The Source	3.5/5 stars

The Washington Post noted that "the Beatnuts stance is hard but not impenetrable, though the laid-back geniality of the first single, 'Props Over Here', seems a little forced and radio-friendly."

In 2012, the album was listed at No. 23 on Complex magazine's "The 50 Greatest Debut Albums in Hip-Hop History". In 2014, the album was listed at No. 19 on Vibe's "The 50 Best Rap Albums of 1994" list.

== Track listing ==
No.	Title	Writer(s)	Performer(s)	Length
1.	"Intro"	Jerry Tineo	The Beatnuts	1:47
2.	"Ya Don't Stop"	Tineo; Lester Fernandez; Berntony Smalls; Michelle Willems; James Edward Heath	Lucien	3:06
3.	"Props Over Here"	Smalls; Fernandez; Tineo	The Beatnuts	3:59
4.	"Hellraiser"	Smalls; Fernandez; Tineo	The Beatnuts	3:10
5.	"Are You Ready" (featuring Grand Puba)	Fernandez; Smalls; Tineo; Victor Padilla; William Ballard Doggett	V.I.C.	3:14
6.	"Superbad"	Fernandez; Smalls; Tineo	The Beatnuts	3:57
7.	"Straight Jacket"	Fernandez; Tineo; Smalls; William Bradford Champlin	The Beatnuts	3:57
8.	"Let Off a Couple"	Smalls; Fernandez; Tineo	The Beatnuts	1:43
9.	"Rik's Joint" (featuring Miss Jones)	Smalls; Tineo	The Beatnuts	4:01
10.	"Fried Chicken"	Fernandez; Smalls; Tineo	The Beatnuts	3:57
11.	"Yeah You Get Props"	Smalls; Tineo; Fernandez	The Beatnuts	3:29
12.	"Get Funky"	Tineo; Fernandez; Smalls; Josef Erich Zawinul	The Beatnuts	3:37
13.	"Hit Me with That"	Tineo; Smalls; Fernandez	The Beatnuts	3:36
14.	"2-3 Break" (featuring Gab Gotcha)	Fernandez; Smalls; Tineo	The Beatnuts	3:17
15.	"Lick the Pussy"	Smalls; Fernandez; Joseph Copeland Garland	The Beatnuts	4:18
16.	"Sandwiches"	Fernandez; Padilla	The Beatnuts	1:33
17.	"Psycho Dwarf"	Fernandez; Tineo	The Beatnuts	5:25
Total length:				58:21

== Personnel ==
- Lester "Psycho Les" Fernandez – vocals, producer
- Jerry "JuJu" Tineo – vocals, producer
- Berntony "Fashion" Smalls – vocals
- Victor "V.I.C." Padilla – producer
- Lenny Underwood – keyboards (track 3)
- Joel "Mista Sinista" Wright – additional scratches (track 5), scratches (track 6)
- Maxwell "Grand Puba" Dixon – vocals (track 5)
- Tarsha Nicole Jones – vocals (track 9)
- Gabriel "Gab Gotcha" Velasquez – vocals (track 14)
- Lucien M'Baïdem – producer (track 2)
- Troy Hightower – recording, mixing
- Kirk Yano – recording, mixing
- Rich Keller – recording
- Andy Blakelock – assistant recording & mixing engineer
- Chris Curran – assistant recording & mixing engineer
- Matt Tuffi – assistant recording & mixing engineer
- Danny Madorsky – assistant recording engineer
- Emerson Mykoo – assistant recording engineer
- Djinji Brown – assistant recording engineer
- Steve Souder – assistant mixing engineer
- Jack Hersca – assistant mixing engineer
- Chris Gehringer – mastering
- Chris Lighty – executive producer
- Peter Kang – executive producer
- David Bett – art direction
- Danny Clinch – photography

== Charts ==
Chart (1994)	Peak position
US Billboard 200	182
US Top R&B Albums (Billboard)	28
