= Intoxicated Demons: The EP =

EP by The Beatnuts
- Released: April 20, 1993
- Recorded: April 1992 – January 1993
- Studio: Variety Recording Studio (New York); LGK Studios (Leonia, New Jersey)
- Genre: Hip hop
- Length: 25:13
- Label: Violator; Relativity
- Producer: The Beatnuts

The Beatnuts chronology
Intoxicated Demons: The EP (1993)	The Beatnuts: Street Level (1994)

Singles from Intoxicated Demons: The EP
- 1. "Reign of the Tec" Released: March 23, 1993; 2. "No Equal" Released: 1993

Professional ratings
Review scores
Source	Rating
AllMusic	3/5 stars
Entertainment Weekly	B+
RapReviews	7.5/10
The New Rolling Stone Album Guide	3/5 stars
The Source	3.5/5 stars

Intoxicated Demons: The EP is the debut extended play by American hip hop trio The Beatnuts. It was released on April 20, 1993, via Violator/Relativity Records. Recording sessions took place at Variety Recording Studio in New York and at LGK Studios in New Jersey. It features one guest vocalist, V.I.C., on the track "World's Famous". Two singles, "Reign of the Tec" and "No Equal", were released in promotion of the album. The album was received positively for its diverse beats and comedic lyrics. Its cover art was inspired by the cover of Hank Mobley's The Turnaround!.

It peaked at number 50 on the US Billboard Top R&B/Hip-Hop Albums chart, and its single "Reign of the Tec" peaked at number 50 on the US Billboard Hot Rap Songs.

== Track listing ==
No.	Title	Length
1.	"World's Famous Intro"	1:01
2.	"World's Famous"	3:23
3.	"Engineer Talking Shit"	0:51
4.	"Psycho Dwarf" (Funk, Drink Beer & Smoke Some Shit!)	3:40
5.	"On the 1+2"	0:37
6.	"No Equal"	4:07
7.	"Reign of the Tec"	3:21
8.	"Quality & The Bushmen off the Top"	0:53
9.	"Third of the Trio"	3:30
10.	"Phone Call"	0:15
11.	"Story" (Pinky In The Twat)	3:35
Total length:		25:13

== Personnel ==
- Lester "Psycho Les" Fernandez – vocals (tracks: 2, 4, 6, 7, 11)
- Jerry "JuJu" Tineo – vocals (tracks: 2, 4, 6, 7)
- Berntony "Fashion" Smalls – vocals (tracks: 6, 7, 9, 11)
- Victor "V.I.C." Padilla – vocals (track 2)
- Rich Keller – recording, mixing (tracks: 3–11)
- John Famolari – recording
- Kirk Yano – mixing (tracks: 1, 2)
- Benjamin Arrindell – engineering assistant
- Jack Hersca – engineering assistant
- Michael Sarsfield – mastering
- David Bett – art direction
- Kathy Milone – design
- Linda Covello – photography
- Chris Lighty – executive producer
- Peter Kang – executive producer

== Charts ==
Chart (1993)	Peak position
US Top R&B/Hip-Hop Albums (Billboard)	50
