= A Musical Massacre =

Studio album by The Beatnuts
- Released: August 10, 1999
- Recorded: June 1998 – March 1999
- Studio: Chung King Studios; Soho Music Studios; Planet Sound Studios (New York, NY)
- Genre: Hip hop
- Length: 1:03:55
- Label: Loud; Relativity
- Producer: The Beatnuts

The Beatnuts chronology
Remix EP: The Spot (1998)	A Musical Massacre (1999)	Take It or Squeeze It (2001)

Singles from A Musical Massacre
- 1. "Watch Out Now" Released: May 4, 1999; 2. "Se Acabo" Released: 1999

Professional ratings
Review scores
Source	Rating
AllMusic	4/5 stars
Rolling Stone	3.5/5 stars
The New Rolling Stone Album Guide	3/5 stars

A Musical Massacre is the third studio album by American hip hop duo The Beatnuts. It was released in August 1999 via Loud Records. Recording sessions took place at Chung King Studios, Soho Music Studios and Planet Sound Studios in New York. Produced entirely by the Beatnuts, it features guest appearances from E-Swinga, Nogoodus, Biz Markie, Carl Thomas, Cheryl Pepsii Riley, Common, Cuban Link, dead prez, Greg Nice, Magic Juan, Marlon Manson, Patrick Blazy, Tony Touch, Triple Seis, Tyler Fernandez and Willie Stubz. The album peaked at number 35 on the Billboard 200 and number 10 on the Top R&B/Hip-Hop Albums in the United States. It contains two singles: "Watch Out Now", which peaked at number 84 on the US Billboard Hot 100, and "Se Acabo".

== Critical reception ==
Del F. Cowie of Exclaim! thought that "revenge fantasies and mic bravado only go so far from two average MCs". Nathan Rabin of The A.V. Club wrote: "Encompassing everything from Marvin Gaye quotations to circus organs to old-school, Too $hort-style drum patterns, the members of The Beatnuts flex their production muscles throughout A Musical Massacre". AllMusic's M.F. DiBella called A Musical Massacre "among 1999's most entertaining hip-hop albums".

== Track listing ==
No.	Title	Writer(s)	Length
1.	"Intro"		2:03
2.	"Beatnuts Forever" (featuring Triple Seis and Marlon Manson)	Lester Fernandez; Jerry Tineo; Sammy Garcia; Danny Wolfe	3:14
3.	"Muchachacha" (featuring Willie Stubz and Swinger)	Fernandez; Tineo; William Lora; E. Pimentel	4:08
4.	"I Love It"	Fernandez; Tineo	4:14
5.	"Slam Pit" (featuring Cuban Link and Common)	Fernandez; Tineo; Felix Delgado; Lonnie Lynn; Shawn McKenzie; Kevin McKenzie; William Paul Mitchell	3:26
6.	"Wild, Wild, What!"		0:45
7.	"Look Around" (featuring dead prez and Cheryl Pepsii Riley)	Fernandez; Tineo; Clayton Gavin; Lavonne Alford	5:18
8.	"Cocotaso" (featuring Tony Touch)		2:16
9.	"Monster for Music"	Fernandez; Tineo; Michael Small; Nathaniel Hall	2:49
10.	"Spelling Beatnuts with Lil' Donny"		1:18
11.	"Puffin' on a Cloud"	Fernandez; Tineo; Barry White; Paul Politi	5:10
12.	"Turn It Out" (featuring Greg Nice)	Fernandez; Tineo; Greg Mays	4:54
13.	"Rated R" (featuring Nogoodus)		1:46
14.	"Who You're Fuckin' Wit"		0:50
15.	"Story 2000" (featuring Patrick Blazy)	Fernandez	3:24
16.	"Watch Out Now"	Fernandez; Tineo; José Fernando Arbex Miró	2:54
17.	"You're a Clown" (featuring Biz Markie and Tyler Fernandez)	Fernandez; Tineo; Marcel Hall	5:00
18.	"Buddah in the Air" (featuring Carl Thomas and Gob Goblin)	Fernandez; Tineo	6:13
19.	"Se Acabo (It's Over)" (featuring Magic Juan and Swinger)	Fernandez; Tineo; John Wilson; E. Pimentel	4:13
Total length:			1:03:55

Sample credits

- Track 2 contains elements from "Giving Up" written by Danny Wolfe and performed by Zulema and "I Got The" written and performed by Labi Siffre
- Track 5 contains elements from "Live at the Barbeque" written by Shawn McKenzie, Kevin McKenzie & William Paul Mitchell and performed by Main Source
- Track 9 contains elements from "Braggin' & Boastin'" written by Nathaniel Hall & Michael Small and performed by The Jungle Bros.
- Track 11 contains elements from "Under the Influence of Love" written by Barry Eugene Carter & Paul Politi and performed by Barry White
- Track 16 contains elements from "Hi-Jack" written by Fernando Arbex

== Personnel ==
- Lester "Psycho Les" Fernandez – vocals, producer, executive producer
- Jerry "JuJu" Tineo – vocals, producer, executive producer
- Sammy "Triple Seis" Garcia – vocals (track 2)
- Marlon "Perro" Manson – vocals (track 2)
- William "Willie Stubz" Lora – vocals (track 3)
- E. "Swinger" Pimentel – vocals (tracks: 3, 19)
- Felix "Cuban Link" Delgado – vocals (track 5)
- Lonnie "Common" Lynn – vocals (track 5)
- Clayton "stic.man" Gavin – vocals (track 7)
- Lavonne "M-1" Alford – vocals (track 7)
- Cheryl Pepsii Riley – additional vocals (track 4), vocals (track 7)
- Joseph "Tony Touch" Hernandez – vocals (track 8)
- Ariel Harris – additional vocals (track 11)
- Asjai Crutchfield – additional vocals (track 11)
- Lindsay Robinson – additional vocals (track 11)
- Gregory "Greg Nice" Mays – vocals (track 12)
- G. "Gab Goblin" Mendez – vocals (tracks: 13, 18)
- Tru Life of Nogoodus – vocals (track 13)
- Patrick Blazy – vocals (track 15)
- Marcel "Biz Markie" Hall – vocals (track 17)
- Tyler Fernandez – vocals (track 17)
- Carl Thomas – vocals (track 18)
- John "Magic Juan" Wilson – vocals (track 19)
- M. "G-Wise" Herald – beatboxing (track 18)
- Chris Conway – recording (track 2), mixing (tracks: 2, 3, 5, 9, 11, 12, 16–19)
- Alex Kyriazis – drums (track 9), recording (tracks: 3–5, 7, 9, 11, 12, 15–19)
- Joe Quinde – mixing (tracks: 4, 7, 15)
- Steve Stabile – recording (tracks: 11, 12)
- Chris Gehringer – mastering
- Carlos A. Pimentel – executive producer
- Chiu Liu – art direction, design, photography
- Piotr Sikora – photography
- Michael Sarsfield – lacquer cut
- Luxie Aquino – A&R

== Charts ==
Chart (1999)	Peak position
US Billboard 200	35
US Top R&B/Hip-Hop Albums (Billboard)	10
