= Off the Books =

Single by The Beatnuts featuring Big Punisher and Cuban Link

from the album Stone Crazy
- Released: September 16, 1997
- Recorded: 1996–97
- Genre: East Coast hip-hop
- Length: 3:42
- Label: Relativity Records
- Songwriters: Lester Fernandez, Jerry Tineo, Christopher Rios, Felix Delgado
- Producer: The Beatnuts

The Beatnuts singles chronology
"Do You Believe?" (1997)	"Off the Books" (1997)	"Here's a Drink" (1997)

Big Pun singles chronology
"Off the Books" (1997)	"I'm Not a Player" (1997)

Cuban Link singles chronology
"Off the Books" (1997)	"Flowers for the Dead" (2000)

Music video
- "Off the Books" on YouTube

"Off the Books" is the third single from Stone Crazy, a 1997 album by East Coast hip-hop group the Beatnuts.

== Background ==
It was released by Relativity Records in both 12 inch and CD format in 1997. The song is produced by The Beatnuts and features raps by Juju and Psycho Les, the first on-record performance by Cuban Link, and a notable early verse from Big Punisher. (Big Pun's first on-record performance was on "Watch Out" a track from Fat Joe's second album Jealous One's Envy) Lyrics from Psycho Les's verse were later sampled in "The Rep Grows Bigga" by Gang Starr and two Beatnuts songs: "No Escapin' This" and "Slam Pit". The track's beat samples "Break that Party and Opening" by Melvin Van Peebles, "Sign Song" by Buddy Baker, "Get out of My Life, Woman" by George Semper and "Hihache" by Lafayette Afro Rock Band.

"Off the Books" was the most commercially successful single from Stone Crazy; it reached #86 on the Billboard Hot 100 making it the first Beatnuts single to appear on the pop chart. Tom Doggett of RapReviews.com explains the source of the song's success:

[The first] verse turned a lot of heads, and had plenty to do with Pun blowing up. What isn't always remembered was the Sesame Street flute sample that inspired him, laid over the uptempo drums and wailing vocal snippet. "Off The Books" is brilliant, one of the most accessible rap songs ever made. Thugs will be pleased with the vicious verses, and yet any club will still get hopping with one spin.

Its popularity landed it on two Beatnuts hits compilations: Beatnuts Forever and Classic Nuts, Vol. 1. It can additionally be found on the soundtracks of two films, 1998's Butter and 2001's Blazin', as well as Big Pun's 2001 album Endangered Species and various hip hop compilation albums.

An "Off the Books" music video, which highlights the lavish lives lived by each rapper, also on the video, Angie Martinez and Fat Joe appeared together at the restaurant. This video was directed by Chris Robinson.

== Track listings ==
CD single

1. "Off the Books (Album Version)"
2. "Off the Books (Instrumental)"
3. "Bless the M.I.C."
4. "Intermission"
5. "Get Funky (Remix)"

12" vinyl
A-side

1. "Off the Books (Clean Version)" (3:34)
2. "Off the Books (Dirty Version)" (3:34)

B-side

1. "Off the Books (T.V. Track)" (3:34)
2. "Off the Books (Instrumental)" (3:34)
3. "Off the Books (Acapella)" (3:25)

== Charts ==
Chart (1997)	Peak position
US Billboard Hot 100	86
US Dance Singles Sales (Billboard)	5
US Hot R&B/Hip-Hop Songs (Billboard)	52
US Hot Rap Songs (Billboard)	12
