= Stone Crazy =

Studio album by The Beatnuts
- Released: June 24, 1997
- Recorded: August 1996 – February 1997
- Studio: Worldwide
- Genre: Hip hop
- Length: 50:49
- Label: Relativity
- Producer: The Beatnuts

The Beatnuts chronology
The Beatnuts: Street Level (1994)	Stone Crazy (1997)	Hydra Beats, Vol. 5 (1997)

Singles from Stone Crazy
- 1. "Find That" Released: December 24, 1996; 2. "Do You Believe?" Released: March 11, 1997; 3. "Off the Books" Released: September 16, 1997; 4. "Here's a Drink" Released: November 3, 1997

Professional ratings
Review scores
Source	Rating
AllMusic	3/5 stars
RapReviews	8.5/10
The New Rolling Stone Album Guide	3/5 stars
The Source	3.5/5 stars

Stone Crazy is the second studio album by American hip hop duo The Beatnuts. It was released on June 24, 1997, via Relativity Records. Recording sessions took place at Worldwide Studios. Produced solely by the Beatnuts, it features guest appearances from Big Pun, Blaq Poet, Cuban Link, Don Gobbi, Gab Gotcha, Horny Man and Hostyle. Member Fashion left the group to pursue a solo career and is not featured on the album.

The album reached number 154 on the Billboard 200 and number 38 on the Top R&B/Hip-Hop Albums in the United States, and is considered their breakthrough album. It contains four singles: "Find That", "Do You Believe?", "Off the Books" and "Here's a Drink".

== Track listing ==
No.	Title	Writer(s)	Length
1.	"World Famous"	David Axelrod	1:29
2.	"Bless the M.I.C." (featuring Gab Gotcha)	Lester Fernandez; Jerry Tineo; Gabriel Velasquez	3:22
3.	"Intermission"		1:10
4.	"Here's a Drink"	Fernandez; Tineo; Jonathan Davis; Malik Taylor; Ali Shaheed Muhammad; James Yancey; Steve Swallow	3:04
5.	"Off the Books" (featuring Big Punisher and Cuban Link)	Fernandez; Tineo; Christopher Rios; Felix Delgado	4:42
6.	"Be Proud/Interlude"		0:27
7.	"Do You Believe?"	Fernandez; Tineo	3:20
8.	"Finger Smoke"		0:47
9.	"Stone Crazy"	Fernandez; Tineo	3:36
10.	"Niggaz Know"	Fernandez; Tineo; Axelrod	4:11
11.	"Horny Horns"		0:34
12.	"Find That"	Fernandez; Tineo	3:54
13.	"Supa Supreme"	Fernandez; Tineo	3:27
14.	"Thinkin 'Bout Cash" (featuring Hostyle and The Poet)	Fernandez; Tineo	4:57
15.	"Uncivilized" (featuring Don Gobbi)	Fernandez; Tineo; Michael Small; Nathaniel Hall	4:45
16.	"Give Me Tha Ass"	Fernandez; Tineo; Patrice Rushen; Freddie Washington; Terri McFaddin	3:50
17.	"Strokes" (featuring Horny Man)	Fernandez; Tineo; Jose C. Perez Sanchez	3:14
Total length:			50:49

== Personnel ==
- Lester "Psycho Les" Fernandez – vocals, producer (tracks: 2, 4, 5, 7, 9, 10, 12–17)
- Jerry "JuJu" Tineo – vocals, producer (tracks: 2, 4, 5, 7, 9, 10, 12–17)
- Gabriel "Gab Gotcha" Velasquez – vocals (track 2)
- Christopher "Big Pun" Rios – vocals (track 5)
- Felix "Cuban Link" Delgado – vocals (track 5)
- Fredrick "Hostyle" Ivey – vocals (track 14)
- Wilbur "Blaq Poet" Bass – vocals (track 14)
- Don Gobbi – vocals (track 15)
- Jose C. "Horny Man" Perez Sanchez – vocals (track 17)
- Herbert Powers Jr. – mastering (tracks: 1–3, 5, 6, 8–15, 17)
- Michael Sarsfield – mastering (tracks: 4, 7, 16)
- David Bett – art direction
- Chiu Liu – design
- Michael Lavine – photography

== Charts ==
Chart (1997)	Peak position
US Billboard 200	154
US Top R&B/Hip-Hop Albums (Billboard)	38

=== Singles ===
Song	Chart (1997)	Peak position
"Do You Believe?"	U.S. Hot R&B/Hip-Hop Songs	81
"Do You Believe?"	U.S. Hot Rap Singles	27
"Off the Books"	U.S. Billboard Hot 100	86
"Off the Books"	U.S. Hot R&B/Hip-Hop Songs	52
"Off the Books"	U.S. Hot Rap Singles	12
