= Tony Touch =

American DJ

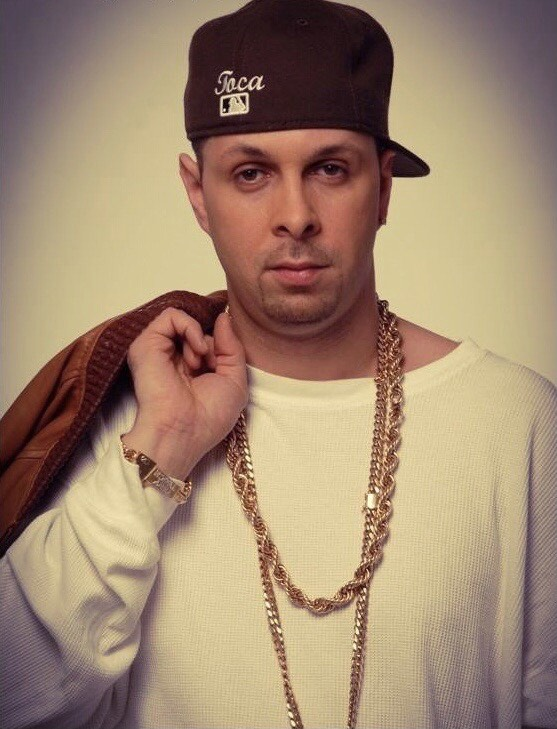

Background information
- Born: Joseph Anthony Hernandez; July 2, 1969 (age 57); Brooklyn, New York, U.S.
- Genres: Hip hop; reggaeton; house
- Occupations: Record producer; singer-songwriter; break dancer; DJ; rapper
- Years active: 1980s–present
- Label: Touch Entertainment
- Website: tonytouch.com

Joseph Anthony Hernandez (born July 2, 1969), professionally known as Tony Touch, is an American hip hop break dancer, rapper, record producer and DJ of Puerto Rican descent.

== Career ==
Tony Touch began as a B-boy during the rap music renaissance era of the early 1980s. Heavily influenced by pioneers like Crazy Legs and the Rock Steady Crew, Grandmaster Flash, Red Alert, Little Louie Vega and Jam Master Jay, he quickly shifted his interests towards the turntables. Tony is known for his mixtapes the 50 MC's. His mixtapes have featured guest appearances from Boot Camp Clik, Eminem, KRS-One, Kool G Rap, Big Daddy Kane, Wyclef Jean, M.O.P., Big L, and Mos Def.

In 2000, Tony released his debut album The Piece Maker on Tommy Boy Records. It sold 400,000 units worldwide and featured guest appearances from Big Pun, Cypress Hill, Wu-Tang Clan, Busta Rhymes, Eminem, and Gang Starr.

In 2000 the single "I Wonder Why" featuring Total was released. The music video featured cameos from John Leguizamo, Rock Steady Crew, Grandmaster Flash, The Awesome 2, Marley Marl, and DJ Premier.

Since then, Tony Touch has released The Piece Maker 2, which featured guest appearances from Puff Daddy, Fat Joe, Sean Paul, Snoop Dogg, and Ruben Blades.

Tony Touch is also known to represent the urban Latino community with his Spanglish lyrics and Salsa roots. This is the result of him growing up with salsa at home and hip-hop influence in his lifestyle.

In 2005 Tony signed to EMI records releasing a reggaeton album, ReggaeTony. The lead single "Play That Song" featured Nina Sky and B-Real of Cypress Hill. The CD included collaborations with artists such as Tego Calderon, Zion and Lenox, Pitbull, Ivy Queen, NORE, Voltio, Mexicano, Thirston Howl III, and Soni. The album went gold, and EMI moved quickly to release ReggaeTony 2. This CD featured Lumidee, Plan B, Joell Ortiz, Tru Life, Don Chezina, and the Beatnuts. To this date Tony has sold over a million records worldwide.

On July 16, 2013, his sixth album The Piece Maker 3: Return of the 50 MC's was released and featured guest appearances from Busta Rhymes, Reek da Villain, Roc Marciano, Lil' Fame, Too Short, Xzibit, Kurupt, B-Real, Papoose, Uncle Murda, Black Thought, Styles P, Sheek Louch, Jadakiss, Raekwon, Ghostface Killah, RZA, Eminem, Twista, Bun B, Action Bronson, Prodigy, Joell Ortiz, Royce da 5'9", KRS-One, Crooked I, Redman, Method Man, N.O.R.E., and Erick Sermon.

In 2016 he paired up with Austin Brown to collaborate as CaliYork. They released the single "Show Up At My Place" in September.

== Discography ==
=== Studio albums ===
- 2000: The Piece Maker
- 2002: The Last of the Pro Ricans
- 2004: The Piece Maker 2
- 2005: The Reggaetony Album
- 2007: Reggaetony 2
- 2013: The Piece Maker 3: Return of the 50 MC's
- 2023: Tony Touch Presents: The Def Tape

=== EPs ===
- 1998: The Rican-Struction

=== Partial mixtape discography ===
- 1991: Hip Hop Volume 1
- 1996: Power Cypha: 50's MCs
- 1997: Power Cypha 2
- 1999: Power Cypha 3: The Grand Finale
- 2002: B-Boy Breaks 3: James Brown Tribute
- 2003: R&B Volume 30: The Love Session
- 2010: Feel Good
- 2011: Feel Good # 2

=== Collaborations ===
- 1997: 5 Deadly Venoms of Brooklyn (w/ Evil Dee, Mister Cee, PF Cuttin and Premier)
- 1997: The Diaz Brother (w/ Doo Wop)
- 1998: Hip Hop 59 ft FunkMaster Flex
- 1998: Terrorist Activity (w/ DJ Khaled)
- 1999: The Diaz Brother: 2 for 5 (w/ Doo Wop)
- 2000: The Diaz Brothers: Live In Japan (w/ Doo Wop)
- 2002: The Diaz Brothers 3 (hosted by Kay Slay)
- 2003: Mucho Muchacho – Chulería

=== Singles ===
List of singles, with selected chart positions
Title	Year	Peak chart positions	
Title	Year	AUS	UK
"I Wonder Why (He's the Greatest DJ)" (featuring Keisha and Pam of Total)	2000	95	68
"Play That Song" (featuring Nina Sky and B-Real)	2005	—	—
