= The Beatnuts =

American hip hop group

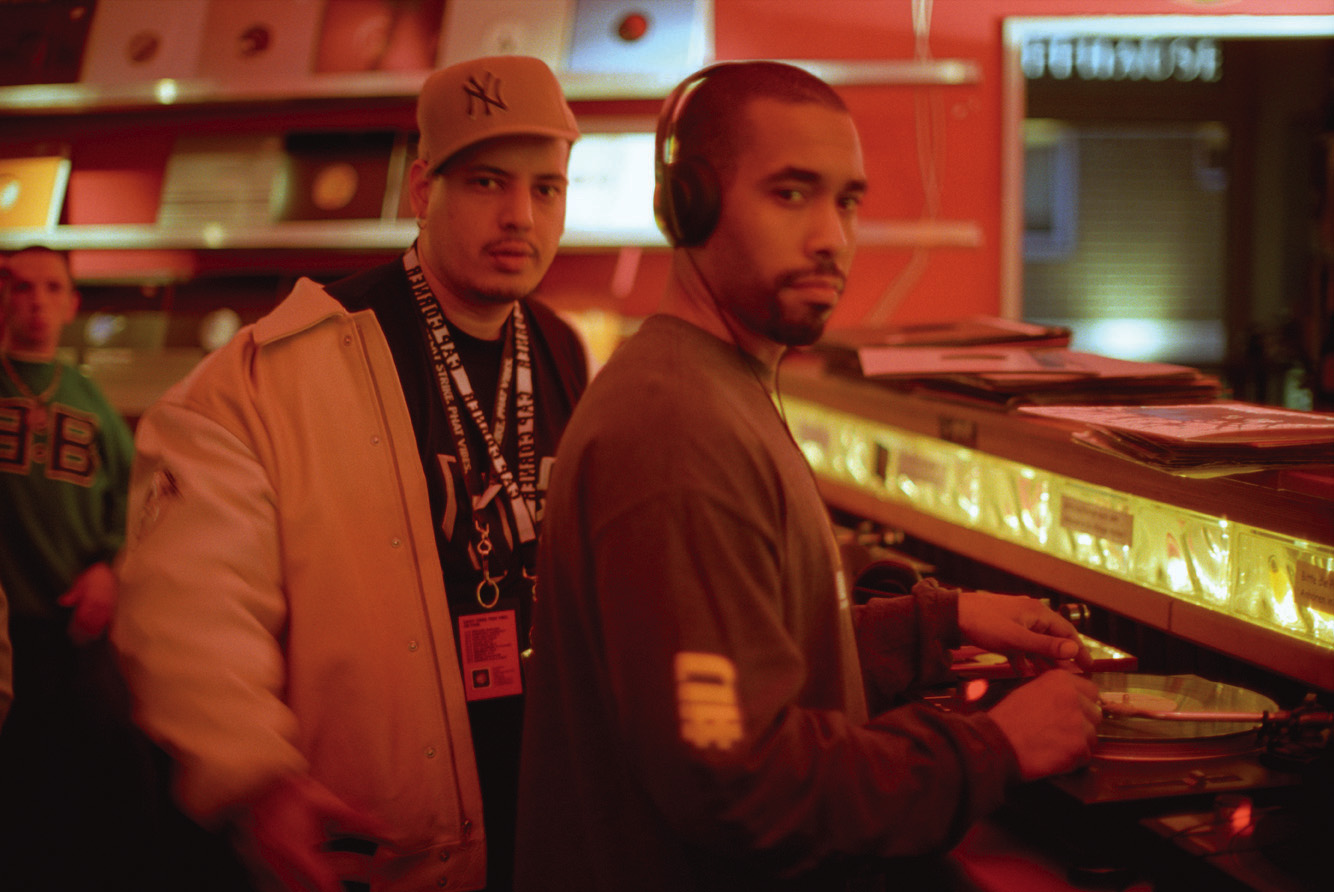
- The Beatnuts in Hamburg, Germany in 2000

Background information
- Origin: New York City, U.S.
- Genres: Hip hop
- Years active: 1989–2009, 2016
- Labels: Combat, Relativity, Violator, Loud, Landspeed, Penalty
- Members: JuJu; Psycho Les
- Past members: Fashion (later Al' Tariq); V.I.C.

The Beatnuts is an American hip hop group and production duo from New York City. Its current members are JuJu and Psycho Les. JuJu (born Jerry Tineo on December 14, 1968) is a Dominican American from Corona and Psycho Les (born Lester Fernandez on April 10, 1970) is a Colombian American from Jackson Heights, Queens. Although only peripheral members, they are routinely acknowledged by Q-Tip as being members of Native Tongues. The Beatnuts were originally a trio before Fashion (born Berntony Smalls on January 13, 1970), now known as Al' Tariq, left the group to start a solo career. V.I.C. (Groove Merchantz, Ghetto Pros) was also a member of The Beatnuts' production team for a while.

== History ==
=== Origins ===
JuJu and Psycho Les grew up in different communities in Queens, New York City. Psycho Les started producing beats and DJing at age 15 under aliases including DJ Les Jams and DJ Incredible. At a high school in Flushing, Queens, a friend DJ Loco Moe introduced Les to fellow producer JuJu. While crate digging, both Beatnuts ran into Afrika Baby Bam from the Jungle Brothers. Afrika introduced them to Native Tongues members including De La Soul, A Tribe Called Quest and the Jungle Brothers. At this time, JuJu and Psycho Les were DJing parties under the alias Beat Kings. The Jungle Brothers claimed that they were not kings, but rather two nuts for their comical nature and the fact that they were crazy enough to carry hundreds of records to every show they played. They thus changed their name and "it stuck." Rapper Kool Fashion later got together with the two Beatnuts members.

=== Early production work ===
The Beatnuts entered the recording industry in 1990 producing two tracks for the British alternative hip hop/electronica group Stereo MCs as well as a song for British rapper Monie Love. Over the next two years, they produced songs for rappers including Common, Pete Nice & DJ Richie Rich and Kurious, as well as a full album for Chi-Ali. As of 1992, JuJu had not appeared on a record, but fellow Beatnuts rappers Fashion and Psycho Les appeared on tracks that he produced. In 1993, The Beatnuts produced more songs for the artists they had previously collaborated with as well as Fat Joe, Suprême NTM and Da Youngsta's. At the same time, The Beatnuts made their name as remix specialists by remixing songs for MC Lyte, Da Lench Mob, Naughty by Nature, Jomanda and others.

=== Debut albums ===
The Beatnuts' early production work earned them a record deal with Combat Records in 1992. The Beatnuts planned on releasing a "mini-LP" through that label, but its release was delayed when Kool Fashion was sentenced to six months of jail for drug convictions. After Fashion completed his sentence, The Beatnuts left Combat Records and signed deals with Violator Management and Relativity Records. In April 1993, The Beatnuts released their debut album, Intoxicated Demons: The EP, through their new label. It featured 11 songs, including the two singles "Reign of the Tec" and "No Equal". The album was characterized by its hedonistic party-style lyrics and sample-heavy jazz beats. It was a critical success receiving favorable reviews by AllMusic, The Source and Entertainment Weekly.

Intoxicated Demons was followed in 1994 with the eponymous full-length album The Beatnuts: Street Level. Street Level followed its preceding EP in style, but slightly surpassed its commercial success by charting on the Billboard 200. It featured two singles, "Props Over Here" and "Hit Me with That", neither of which were commercial hits. Street Level was the last Beatnuts album released before Fashion left the group to become a devout Muslim and solo artist under the alias Al' Tariq. He left The Beatnuts on good terms and collaborated with his former group on future albums.

=== Commercial breakthroughs ===
The Beatnuts did not follow up their 1994 album until releasing Stone Crazy in 1997. Although it contained "Off the Books", a single that charted on the Billboard Hot 100, featured a standout performance by Big Pun and the first on-record performance from Cuban Link, the album was not a critical success. Leo Stanley of AllMusic attributed its mediocre reception to its lack of energy—not its "jazz-inflected rhythms and hardcore rhyming". Chris Ryan of Rolling Stone conceded that the album was still "something of a breakthrough" for The Beatnuts in spite of itself. Two weeks after the release of Stone Crazy, The Beatnuts released Hydra Beats, Vol. 5, a small-scale instrumental album. Vol. 5 was one album in a series of vinyl instrumental albums released by underground label Hydra Entertainment.

1998 saw the release of The Spot, a remix EP that revamped songs from the first three non-instrumental Beatnuts albums. It additionally featured sequels to older Beatnuts tracks and one new song, "Treat$". It was released in anticipation of 1999's A Musical Massacre, The Beatnuts' most commercially and critically successful album. A Musical Massacre reached No. 35 on the Billboard 200 due to its hit single "Watch Out Now". The album is hailed for its "eclectic" and "textured" beats as well as its "rough, rugged, and raunchy" lyrics with slightly more content variation than past releases.

After Sony released The Beatnuts's first hits compilation, 1999's World Famous Classics, The Beatnuts did not record another album until 2001's Take It or Squeeze It. Their 2001 album contained two slightly popular singles, "No Escapin' This" and "Let's Git Doe", but was unable to match the commercial or critical success of A Musical Massacre. Reviews by both AllMusic and Rolling Stone claimed that Take It or Squeeze It had a mix of inventive production and clichéd gangster rhymes.

=== Return to underground ===
The Beatnuts' official logo. It is inspired by a similar symbol on the cover art of Hank Mobley's The Turnaround.

In November 2001, it was announced that Loud Records—whose father label Relativity Records had released all Beatnuts albums since their 1993 debut—had cut ties with The Beatnuts. The decision was followed by the release of two greatest hits: 2001's Beatnuts Forever and 2002's Classic Nuts, Vol. 1. While The Beatnuts were free agents, a rumor surfaced that JuJu and Psycho Les were going to collaborate with Al' Tariq under the group alias 'Intoxicated Demons'. The Beatnuts did not reunite with Al Tariq, but instead signed with the underground label LandSpeed Records. In 2002, they released The Originators, a commercial failure that did not reach the Billboard 200 or contain charting singles. The album was still a critical success because of its catchy hooks and creative beats. Steve Juon of RapReviews.com remarked on the correlation between The Beatnuts' critical and commercial success:

If they are less known and don't sell as well being on an indie imprint like LandSpeed Records, it will still be worth it if the increased quality of their beats and rhymes remain this high.

Instead of remaining on LandSpeed Records, The Beatnuts signed to Penalty Recordings before releasing their 2004 album Milk Me. Although Penalty was also an underground label, Milk Me was still able to scrape the bottom of the Billboard 200. The album was almost unanimously held to be solid. Nonetheless, three singles and an Akon guest appearance did not propel the album to the commercial success of prior Beatnuts albums.

==== "Watch Out Now" controversy ====
Milk Me contained the song "Confused Rappers", a track that dissed Jennifer Lopez for allegedly stealing the beat from The Beatnuts' "Watch Out Now" on her 2002 hit "Jenny from the Block". The song criticizes Lopez's singing ability and looks, but ultimately criticizes the track's producers, Trackmasters and Cory Rooney, for allegedly stealing the beat. Although The Beatnuts did eventually receive royalties, Psycho Les is still critical of the track's producers. The beats on both "Watch Out Now" and "Jenny from the Block" sample the Enoch Light cover of "Hi-Jack" by Fernando Arbex of the Spanish group Barrabás. Barrabás created the original drum and bass lines, with the flute transposition of the melodic loop (the famous sample in the Beatnuts and Jennifer Lopez tracks) introduced in the Herbie Mann and Enoch Light covers.

=== Recent endeavors ===
In March 2007, Psycho Les released his debut solo album Psycho Therapy (The Soundtrack) on Pit Fight Records. Psycho Les additionally joined with Al Tariq and Problemz to form the group Big City. In June, they released The City Never Sleeps on Nature Sounds.

Later that year, The Beatnuts had a track included on the Official Joints mixtape, a collection of previously unreleased songs by NYC rappers.

In December, JuJu was arrested in Stockholm, Sweden for an alleged assault. He was detained for 36 hours for a "minor assault" after performing a concert.

On September 30, 2008, Pit Fight Records released U.F.O. Files, a compilation of previously unreleased Beatnuts songs.

In October 2009, Deez Nuts, a semi-autobiographical theatre production conceived by Sacha Jenkins and starring The Beatnuts ran for 3 nights at the Ohio Theatre as part of the New York Hip-Hop Theater Festival.

The Beatnuts partnered with the West Coast Hip hop group Tha Alkaholiks in 2016 to form a super crew known as the Liknuts which toured together.

Both JuJu and Psycho Les contributed beats for Tony Touch's The Piece Maker 3: Return of the 50 MC's,

They went Tik Tok Viral with the song "Se Acabo" and re-released it in Remix version in 2022 featuring Method Man.

== Style ==
The Beatnuts are known for their sample-heavy beats and explicit party-ready lyrics. In early records, the beats had a jazz and funk-influenced sound, but later songs were influenced by Latin music. Critics have commented that The Beatnuts have consistently good beats, but lack in terms of lyrics. JuJu addressed this in a 2004 interview:

We are all about the beat, that's our formula when we produce shit, the beats gotta be hot, it's gotta grab you. 'Cause I'll be the first nigga to say that we're not the best MCs in the world. It kills me to hear these nice MCs rhyming over fucking garbage.

== Discography ==
=== Studio albums ===
- The Beatnuts: Street Level (1994)
- Stone Crazy (1997)
- A Musical Massacre (1999)
- Take It or Squeeze It (2001)
- The Originators (2002)
- Milk Me (2004)

=== Extended plays ===
- Intoxicated Demons: The EP (1993)
- Remix EP: The Spot (1998)
