= Big Pun discography =

- Studio albums: 2
- Compilation albums: 2
- Singles: 19

The discography of Big Pun contains two studio albums, one compilation album and 19 singles (including 13 as featured artist).

== Albums ==
=== Studio albums ===
List of albums, with selected chart positions
Title	Album details	Peak chart positions				Certifications
Title	Album details	US	US R&B	CAN	UK	Certifications
Capital Punishment	Released: April 28, 1998; Label: Loud; Format: CD, CS, LP	5	1	11	—	RIAA: Platinum; MC: Gold
Yeeeah Baby	Released: April 4, 2000; Label: Loud; Format: CD, CS, LP	3	1	—	102	RIAA: Platinum
"—" denotes a recording that did not chart or was not released in that territory.

=== Compilation albums ===
List of albums, with selected chart positions
Title	Album details	Peak chart positions		
Title	Album details	US	US R&B	UK
Endangered Species	Released: April 3, 2001; Label: Loud; Format: CD, CS	7	2	146
The Legacy: The Best of Big Pun	Released: September 15, 2009; Label: Loud / Legacy; Format: CD	—	77	—
"—" denotes a recording that did not chart or was not released in that territory.

== Singles ==
=== Solo ===
List of singles, with selected chart positions
Title	Year	Peak chart positions					Album
Title	Year	US	US R&B	US Rap	NZ	UK	Album
"I'm Not a Player"	1997	57	19	3	34	153	Capital Punishment
"Still Not a Player" (featuring Joe)	1998	24	6	13	37	—	Capital Punishment
"You Came Up" (featuring Noreaga)	1998	—	49	43	—	—	Capital Punishment
"It's So Hard" (featuring Donell Jones)	2000	75	19	11	—	—	Yeeeah Baby
"100%" (featuring Tony Sunshine)	2000	—	64	—	—	—	Yeeeah Baby
"How We Roll" (featuring Ashanti)	2001	—	53	16	—	—	Endangered Species
"—" denotes a recording that did not chart or was not released in that territory.

=== As featured performer ===
List of singles, with selected chart positions
Title	Year	Peak chart positions			Album
Title	Year	US	US R&B	US Rap	Album
"Fire Water" (Fat Joe featuring Big Pun, Raekwon and Armaggedon)	1996	—	—	—	Envy 12"
"Off the Books" (The Beatnuts featuring Big Pun and Cuban Link)	1997	86	52	12	Stone Crazy
"Banned from T.V." (Noreaga featuring Nature, Big Pun, Cam'ron, Jadakiss and Styles P)	1998	—	—	—	N.O.R.E.
"Horse & Carriage (Remix)" (Cam'ron featuring Big Pun, Charli Baltimore, Silkk the Shocker & Wyclef Jean)	1998	56	—	18	Horse & Carriage 12"
"I'll Be Around" (Rah Sun featuring Big Pun and Deuce)	1998	125	89	30	It's Not a Game
"Verbal Murder 2" (Pete Rock featuring Big Pun, Noreaga and Common)	1998	—	—	—	Soul Survivor
"Western Ways Part II (La Seleccion)" (Delinquent Habits featuring Big Pun and JuJu)	1998	—	102	—	Here Come the Horns
"Bet Ya Man Can't (Triz)" (Fat Joe featuring Big Pun, Cuban Link and Triple Seis)	1998	—	54	37	Don Cartagena
"Let the Games Begin" (Mack 10 featuring Big Pun and Fat Joe)	1998	—	—	—	The Recipe
"Symphony 2000" (Truck featuring Big Pun, Kool G Rap and KRS-One)	1999	—	—	35	Non-album single
"Top of the World (Remix)" (Brandy featuring Big Pun and Fat Joe)	1999	—	—	—	U Don't Know Me (EP)
"Whatcha Gon Do?" (Terror Squad)	1999	96	—	28	Terror Squad: The Album
"Livin' la Vida Loca (Remix)" Ricky Martin featuring Big Pun, Cuban Link and Fat Joe]	1999	—	14	—	Livin' la Vida Loca 12"
"From N.Y. to N.O." (Mr. Serv-On featuring Big Pun)	1999	—	—	—	Da Next Level
"On Point" (Heavy D featuring 8Ball and Big Pun)	1999	—	—	—	Heavy
"Feelin' So Good" (Jennifer Lopez featuring Fat Joe and Big Pun)	2000	51	44	—	On the 6

== Guest appearances ==
List of non-single guest appearances, with other performing artists, showing year released and album name
Title	Year	Artist(s)	Album
"Watch Out"	1995	Fat Joe, Armageddon, Keith Nut	Jealous One's Envy
"Freestyle"	1995	Funkmaster Flex, Fat Joe	The Mix Tape, Vol. 1
"No Mercy"	1996	Flesh-n-Bone, Fat Joe	T.H.U.G.S. (Trues Humbly United Gatherin' Souls)
"You Ain't a Killer"	1997	—N/a	Soul in the Hole (soundtrack) / Capital Punishment
"Godfather"	1997	Yaviah	Boricua Guerrero: First Combat
"Some 1 2 Hold" (Remix)	1997	Veronica, Cuban Link	Rise
"Must Be the Music"	1997	DJ Skribble, Cuban Link	Traffic Jams
"Drop It Heavy"	1998	Showbiz and A.G., KRS-One	Full Scale
"Shut 'Em Down" (Remix)	1998	Onyx, Noreaga	Shut 'Em Down
"Cross Bronx Expressway"	1998	Lord Tariq and Peter Gunz, Fat Joe	Make It Reign
"I Still Love You" (I Always Love You Remix)	1998	Next	12"
"2 Way Street" (Remix)	1998	Miss Jones	The Other Woman
"Who You Are"	1998	Yankee B, Reign	Mucho Dinero
"Thug Brothers"	1998	Funkmaster Flex, Noreaga	The Mix Tape, Vol. III
"Freestyle Over "At the Speed of Life"	1998	Funkmaster Flex, Fat Joe, Terror Squad	The Mix Tape, Vol. III
"Round & Round" (Remix)	1998	Mary J. Blige	12"
"Makes Me Sweat"	1998	Beenie Man	How Stella Got Her Groove Back OST
"Clap Your Hands"	1998	Royal Flush, Noreaga	12"
"Triplets"	1998	Fat Joe, Prospect	Don Cartagena
"My World"	1998	Fat Joe	Don Cartagena
"John Blaze"	1998	Fat Joe, Nas, Jadakiss, Raekwon	Don Cartagena
"The Hidden Hand"	1998	Fat Joe, Terror Squad	Don Cartagena
"Terror Squadians"	1998	Fat Joe, Terror Squad	Don Cartagena/Rush Hour OST
"The Mission"	1998	Digital Underground	Who Got the Gravy?
"Sex, Money & Drugs"	1998	Next	Slam: The Soundtrack
"None Like You" (Remix)	1998	Aaron Hall, Fat Joe, Cuban Link, Unique	Inside of You
"Block Party"	1998	Kid Capri, Noreaga	Soundtrack to the Streets
"Quiet on tha Set"	1998	Fat Joe, Cuban Link	Straight Outta Compton: N.W.A 10th Anniversary Tribute
"Fantastic 4"	1998	DJ Clue?, Cam'ron, Noreaga, Canibus	The Professional
"Pina Colada"	1999	Sheek Louch	Ryde or Die Vol. 1
"When I Die"	1999	Krayzie Bone, Fat Joe, Cuban Link	Thug Mentality 1999
"We Could Do It"	1999	Naughty by Nature	Nineteen Naughty Nine: Nature's Fury
"Who Is a Thug"	1999	6430	Whiteboys OST
"Heavy Weights"	1999	Fat Joe, 8Ball	Violator: The Album
"Is It You? (Déjà Vu)" (Remix)	1999	Made Men, Mase, Cardan	Classic Limited Edition
"Oh No" (Remix)	1999	Noreaga, Angie Martinez, Capone, Jadakiss, Musaliny-N-Maze	12"
"Make the Crowd Roar"	1999	Armageddon, Fat Joe	WCW Mayhem: The Music
"Dramacide"	2000	The X-Ecutioners, Kool G Rap	Black and White (soundtrack)
"Slippery When Wet"	2000	Luke, Cuban Link, Armageddon	Luke's Freak Fest 2000
"The Foundation"	2000	Tony Touch, Reif-Hustle, Sunkiss	The Piece Maker
"Where Ya At"	2000	D.I.T.C.	D.I.T.C.
"Toe to Toe"	2000	Cuban Link	24K {unreleased}
"Cheat on Her"	2000	Cuban Link, Carl Thomas	24K {unreleased}
"Turn Your Love Around" (Remix)	2000	Paradise, Prospect	Paradise in Your Eyes
"Caribbean Connection"	2000	Shootyz Groove	Loud Rocks
"Still Not a Player"	2000	Incubus	Loud Rocks
"Live at Jimmy's"	2001	Angie Martinez, Cuban Link, Domingo, Sunkiss	Up Close and Personal
"Harsh Reality"	2004	Triple Seis	Only Time'll Tell
"Get Your Grind On"	2005	The Notorious B.I.G., Fat Joe, Freeway	Duets: The Final Chapter
"Thug Love"	2006	Remy Ma	There's Something About Remy: Based on a True Story
"Once Upon a Time"	2011	Cuban Link	Chain Gang Bully
"Kings"	2012	Chino XL	Ricanstruction: The Black Rosary

== Music Videos ==
Other Artists	Album	Song	Year
The Beatnuts, Cuban Link	Stone Crazy	Off the Books	1997
Rah Sun	`	I'll Be Around	1997
—N/a	Capital Punishment	I'm Not a Player	1997
Joe	Capital Punishment	Still Not a Player	1998
Noreaga	Capital Punishment	You Came Up	1998
Fat Joe	Capital Punishment	Twinz (Deep Cover 98)	1998
Noreaga, Jadakiss, Styles P, Cam'Ron, Nature	N.O.R.E.	Banned From TV	1998
Cam'Ron, Wyclef Jean, Charli Baltimore, Silkk the Shocker	Non-album single	Horse & Carriage (Remix)	1998
Fat Joe, Nas, Raekwon, Jadakiss	Don Cartagena	John Blaze	1998
Terror Squad	Don Cartagena	Bet Ya Man Can't (Triz)	1998
Mack 10, Fat Joe	The Recipe	Let the Games Begin	1998
—N/a	Terror Squad	Whatcha Gonna Do?	1999
Mr. Serv-On	Da Next Level	From N.Y. to N.O.	1999
Heavy D, Fat Joe	Heavy	On Point	1999
Jennifer Lopez, Fat Joe	On the 6	Feelin' Good	1999
