= Endangered Species (Big Pun album) =

Compilation album by Big Pun
- Released: April 3, 2001 (USA)
- Recorded: 1997–2000
- Genre: Hip hop
- Length: 73:23
- Label: Loud Records
- Producers: Fat Joe (Executive); Sean Cane (Co-executive)

Big Pun chronology
Yeeeah Baby (2000)	Endangered Species (2001)

Singles from Endangered Species
- 1. "How We Roll" Released: February 7, 2001

Professional ratings
Review scores
Source	Rating
AllMusic	4.5/5 stars
Entertainment Weekly	A−
NME	9/10
RapReviews	7/10
Rolling Stone	3.5/5 stars
Vibe	4/5 stars

Endangered Species is a posthumous compilation of unreleased tracks, guest appearances, and greatest hits by the late rapper Big Pun, released on April 3, 2001, by Loud Records, following his death in February 2000. The album reached a peak chart position of #7. The proceeds from the album were to be given to Pun's widow, Liza Rios, and their three children. Liza Rios claims to have only received a small royalty check from the sales of Endangered Species, and in response, auctioned off her husband's Terror Squad medallion in July 2005.

The album's single, "How We Roll", featured R&B newcomer Ashanti singing the chorus. The music video for the song features both artists animated using cartoon-styled 3D computer graphics. Fellow rapper and close friend Fat Joe, who was also the compilation's executive producer, revealed in the liner notes of the album that the title chosen for the compilation was in fact the original title for 2000's Yeeeah Baby. All of Pun's lyrics were included in the booklet of the disc, partly due to the limited amount of promotional tools available to the label, and partly because of a desire to emphasize Pun's technique as a lyricist.

== Track listing ==
#	Title	Performer(s)	Producer(s)	Original album	Length
1	"Intro"	Big Pun			0:15
2	"You Ain't a Killer"	Big Pun	Young Lord	Capital Punishment	3:52
3	"Twinz (Deep Cover '98)"	Big Pun, Fat Joe	Dr. Dre	Capital Punishment	3:48
4	"Whatcha Gon Do"	Big Pun	JuJu	Terror Squad: The Album	3:07
5	"How We Roll"	Big Pun, Ashanti	Irv Gotti, Tru Stylze		3:34
6	"Still Not a Player"	Big Pun, Joe	Knobody	Capital Punishment	3:58
7	"Off the Books"	Big Pun, The Beatnuts, Cuban Link	The Beatnuts	Stone Crazy	2:48
8	"Words from Nore"	Noreaga			0:52
9	"Banned from T.V."	Big Pun, Noreaga, Jadakiss, Styles, Nature, Cam'ron	Swizz Beatz	N.O.R.E.	4:19
10	"Mamma"	Big Pun, Tony Sunshine	The Alchemist		4:16
11	"The Beat Box"	Big Pun			0:14
12	"Brave in the Heart"	Big Pun, Triple Seis, Fat Joe, Prospect	V.I.C., Mike Heron		3:56
13	"The Dream Shatterer (Original Version)"	Big Pun	Buckwild	First version released on Capital Punishment	3:19
14	"Words with Fat Joe"	Fat Joe			0:37
15	"John Blaze"	Big Pun, Fat Joe, Nas, Raekwon, Jadakiss	Ski	Don Cartagena	4:06
16	"My World"	Big Pun	EZ Elpee		3:29
17	"Pina Colada"	Big Pun, Sheek	Swizz Beatz	Ryde or Die Vol. 1	4:09
18	"Top of the World (Remix)"	Big Pun, Brandy, Fat Joe	Darkchild	U Don't Know Me (Like U Used To)	3:48
19	"Livin' la Vida Loca (Remix)"	Big Pun, Ricky Martin, Fat Joe, Cuban Link	Poke & Tone		2:43
20	"Fire Water"	Big Pun, Fat Joe, Armageddon, Raekwon	Showbiz	B-side to Fat Joe's "Envy" single from Jealous One's Envy	4:15
21	"Classic Verses (Drop It Heavy and Fantastic 4)"	Big Pun	Showbiz, DJ Clue?, Duro	"Drop It Heavy" verse from Full Scale EP "Fantastic 4" verse from The Professional	2:18
22	"Freestyle with Remy Martin"	Big Pun, Remy Martin	Sean Cane		1:33
23	"Wishful Thinking"	Big Pun, Fat Joe, Kool G Rap, B-Real of Cypress Hill	Showbiz	B-side to Big Pun's single "I'm Not a Player" from Capital Punishment	4:00
24	"How We Roll '98"	Big Pun, Pun's Kids, Veronica	K-Cut, Rashad Smith		4:07
