= Ken Lewis (musician) =

American musical artist & producer

- Born: Cincinnati, Ohio, U.S.
- Origin: New York City, U.S.
- Genres: Hip hop; pop; R&B; rock
- Occupations: Producer; mixer; songwriter; musician; vocalist
- Years active: 1993–present
- Website: kenlewis.com

Ken Lewis is an American record producer, mixing engineer, songwriter, and multi-instrumentalist based in New York City. He has been nominated by name for his contributions to 7 Grammy-nominated projects including on Eminem's Recovery, Kanye West's The College Dropout, FUN.'s Some Nights, and others. He has also contributed production, songwriting, engineering, arranging and/or instrumentation and vocals to numerous gold, platinum, and diamond records including Mark Ronson and Bruno Mars' "Uptown Funk", Lil Wayne and Drake's "Believe Me", and Kanye West and Jamie Foxx's "Gold Digger" (among many others). He is the creator of two web-based instructional platforms: Audio School Online and Music School Online. Lewis is also half the production team, Katalyst, with Brent Kolatalo.

== Early life and education ==
Ken Lewis was born and grew up in the Cincinnati, Ohio area. As a child, he showed an interest in music and learned how to play the guitar at age 10. He attended Lakota High School in Butler County, Ohio and graduated in 1988. After high school, he went to the Berklee College of Music in Boston, graduating in 1991.

== Career ==
After graduating from Berklee, Lewis moved to New York City where he got a job as an assistant in a music studio. He worked his way up to engineer at the studio before becoming a freelance producer and engineer a few years after that. Between the mid-1990s and 2000, Lewis engineered, produced, or played instruments on 16 gold and platinum albums and recorded acts like Mary J. Blige, Diana Ross, Jody Watley, George Benson, Public Enemy, and numerous others. In October 2000, he was among the first mixing engineers to be signed to New York-based Sound on Sound Studios' engineer and producer management arm known as SOS Management.

In 2000, Lewis contributed to the Cuban Link album, 24K, working on the songs "Still Telling Lies" featuring Tony Sunshine, "Project Party" featuring SunKiss and the album's lead single "Flowers For The Dead".

In 2004, Lewis mixed and performed on the Usher song, "Throwback", which appeared on Usher's diamond-certified Confessions album. Also that year, Lewis worked as a writer, arranger, musician, and vocalist on Kanye West's debut studio album, The College Dropout, including co-writing the hit "Last Call". Lewis later said that he barely slept for the final two weeks of production on The College Dropout, calling the effort "probably the worst thing I've ever done to my body."

The following year, he created music for West's single "Gold Digger" featuring Jamie Foxx, although he went uncredited on that song. Throughout this period, Lewis worked with fellow Lakota High School alumnus and Berklee attendee, Brent Kolatalo. In 2007, he formed a production team with Kolatalo that was originally known as "The Skywalkers" and was later renamed, "Katalyst". By 2008, Lewis had worked with acts like Joe Budden, Ghostface Killah, John Legend, and Danity Kane, among numerous others. He mixed back-to-back number one albums that year with Danity Kane's Welcome to the Dollhouse and Day26's self-titled album.

In 2005, Ken contributed to the Cuban Link album, Chain Reaction, mixing nearly half of the tracks to the album, some of the songs being "Sugar Daddy", "Scandalous" and also produced "Letter To Pun".

Also in 2008, Lewis contributed to the Kanye West album, 808s & Heartbreak, performing staccato flute on "Heartless" and creating the orchestral section in "RoboCop". In 2010, he continued working with West, contributing to his next album, My Beautiful Dark Twisted Fantasy. His vocals and brass arrangements were featured on "All of the Lights", and he (along with Alvin Fields) provided the chant vocals on "Power". He was also an engineer on Eminem's album, Recovery, that would eventually be nominated for the Grammy Award for Album of the Year and won the award for Best Rap Album. Also that year, he mixed Jeremih's "Down on Me" (featuring 50 Cent). In 2011, Lewis created the choir and live band arrangements for Drake's "Lord Knows", which appeared on his album, Take Care. He contributed to five songs on the Jay-Z and Kanye West album, Watch the Throne, in various roles including writer, horn arranger, musician, vocalist, engineer, and accordion player.

In 2011 and 2012, he was noted for creating the "big drums" for both Fun.'s "We Are Young" and Alicia Keys' "Girl on Fire". In 2011, he also founded Audio School Online, an instructional platform with video tutorials and lessons on how to produce and engineer music. In 2013, he was a co-producer on 9 songs on the J. Cole album, Born Sinner, and produced the song, "Don't Front", on the Eminem album, The Marshall Mathers LP 2. He is also a writer and performer on Lil Wayne's "Believe Me" (featuring Drake). In 2014, Lewis wrote some of the lyrics for the Rick Ross song, "Sanctified" (featuring Kanye West and Big Sean). He also mixed the Wu Tang Clan's entire secret double album, Once Upon a Time in Shaolin, which was notably auctioned as only a single copy.

In 2015, he earned a songwriting credit on the Kendrick Lamar track, "The Blacker the Berry", which appeared on Lamar's album, To Pimp a Butterfly. He was also an engineer on the multi-platinum single, "Uptown Funk", by Mark Ronson and featuring Bruno Mars. That year, he also founded the Music School Online, which is similar to Audio School Online except that it has video tutorials and lessons geared toward teaching students how to sing or play instruments.

In 2016, he contributed to Lady Gaga's album, Joanne, playing drums on the track, "Come to Mama". In the same year, he also contributed to Mars's album, 24K Magic, playing additional horns on the track, "Perm". In the following years, Lewis has worked on multiple BTS projects (You Never Walk Alone, Love Yourself: Tear, etc.) and Taylor Swift's 2019 album, Lover. With Brent Kolatalo as part of their production team Katalyst, Lewis has produced songs for Future, Ciara, Eminem, X Ambassadors, Kendrick Lamar, K Michelle, Kanye West, Jay-Z, Des Rocs, and many others.

In 2025, he started mentoring aspiring DJ and music producer, Tommy Pruett (DJ TommyCooks) of the University of Dayton. https://soundcloud.com/djtommy_cooks

== Nominations and awards ==
Year	Award	Category	Nominee(s)	Result	Ref.
2005	Grammy Award	Album of the Year	Confessions by Usher	Nominated	
2005	Grammy Award	Album of the Year	The College Dropout by Kanye West	Nominated	
2006	Grammy Award	Album of the Year	Late Registration	Nominated	
2006	Grammy Award	Record of the Year	"Gold Digger" by Kanye West (feat. Jamie Foxx)	Nominated	
2011	Grammy Award	Album of the Year	Recovery by Eminem	Nominated	
2013	Grammy Award	Album of the Year	Some Nights by Fun.	Nominated	
2013	Grammy Award	Record of the Year	"We Are Young" by Fun.	Nominated	
