= Chain Reaction (Cuban Link album) =

Studio album by Cuban Link
- Released: August 16, 2005
- Recorded: 2004–2005
- Studio: Platinum Sound Studios; Sony Music Studios (New York, NY)
- Genre: Hip-hop; East Coast hip-hop; Latin hip-hop; reggaeton
- Length: 1:05:39
- Label: M.O.B.; Universal
- Producer: Big Humma; Falling Down; Mr. Porter; Spkilla; Swizz Beatz; Tiger; Big Menz; Eliel; Ken Lewis

Cuban Link chronology
24K (2000)	Chain Reaction (2005)

Singles from Chain Reaction
- 1. "Sugar Daddy" Released: March 26, 2005; 2. "Scandalous" Released: June 18, 2005; 3. "Letter to Pun" Released: August 16, 2005

Professional ratings
Review scores
Source	Rating
AllMusic	4/5 stars
HipHopDX	3.5/5
RapReviews	5/10
Vibe	3/5 stars

Chain Reaction is the second studio album and official debut by Cuban-American rapper Cuban Link. It was released on August 16, 2005 via M.O.B. Records through a joint venture with Universal. Production was handled by Big Humma, Swizz Beatz, Falling Down, Kon Artis, SPK and Tiger, with co-producers Big Menz, Eliel and Ken Lewis. It features guest appearances from Avant, Cap.1, Don Omar, Jadakiss, Mýa, Syleena Johnson, Zion and One Solo.

In the United States, the album debuted at number 188 on the Billboard 200, number 44 on the Top R&B/Hip-Hop Albums and number 8 on the Heatseekers Albums charts.

The album came after his major-label studio album project 24K was shelved in 2000. Chain Reaction was packaged as an enhanced CD with music videos, pictures and a teaser to his future DVD release Tale from the Bronx.

== Background ==
Prior to the formation of Terror Squad, Cuban was at a turning point in his career after debuting on The Beatnuts single "Off the Books", guest appearing on Big Pun's album Capital Punishment and signing to Atlantic Records. In addition, Cuban and the Terror Squad released their self-titled debut album on September 21, 1999.

After Big Pun released his first solo album, Cuban was next up to shine. He was scheduled to release his major-label debut 24K in the summer of 2000 under Atlantic Records. After several delays, bootlegging issues and contract disputes with Fat Joe, the album was eventually shelved. This caused Cuban's career to derail and forced him to go underground. A few years after being blackballed out of the industry, Cuban signed with M.O.B. Records and started to work on his official debut LP.

== Singles ==
The album spawned the singles "Scandalous" featuring Don Omar which peaked number 45 on the Billboard Hot Latin Tracks chart in 2005, "Sugar Daddy" featuring Mýa which debuted on 106 & Park and "Letter to Pun" where the song's video is on the DVD.

In addition, the songs "Shakedown" and "Talk About It" featuring Jadakiss were both released as promotional singles.

== Track listing ==
All tracks are written by Felix Delgado (Cuban Link), additional writers listed below.

No.	Title	Writer(s)	Producer(s)	Length
1.	"My Story"			1:40
2.	"Chain Reaction"		Big Humma	4:20
3.	"No Mercy"		Big Humma	4:10
4.	"Comin' Home with Me" (featuring Avant)		Swizz Beatz	4:20
5.	"Riderz" (featuring Cap.1)	Leon Smith	Big Humma	4:31
6.	"Scandalous" (featuring Don Omar)		Big Humma; Eliel	3:52
7.	"Sugar Daddy" (featuring Mýa)	Tracy Curry; Lorenzo Patterson	Tiger	4:02
8.	"Tonight's the Night"		Kon Artis	3:30
9.	"Private Party"		Big Humma; Big Menz	3:44
10.	"Dirty Karaoke Skit"			1:51
11.	"I Need to Know"		Big Humma	4:14
12.	"No Falla" (featuring Zion)		SPKilla	4:50
13.	"Shakedown"		Swizz Beatz	5:08
14.	"Talk About It" (featuring Jadakiss)	Jason Phillips	Swizz Beatz	3:45
15.	"Life Goes On" (featuring Syleena Johnson)		Big Humma; Big Menz (co.)	4:24
16.	"Prison Wisdom"			1:48
17.	"Letter to Pun"		Falling Down; Ken Lewis (co.)	5:30
Total length:				1:05:39

Notes

- ^{^[co]} signifies a co-producer
- "Comin' Home with Me" and "Shakedown" both feature additional vocals from Swizz Beatz.
- "Private Party" features additional vocals from Big Humma.
- "Letter to Pun" features additional vocals from One Solo.

Sample credits

- "No Mercy" contains excerpts of "Main Title Theme (The Fog)", as composed by John Carpenter.
- "Sugar Daddy" contains an interpolation of "Niggaz 4 Life", as written by Tracy Curry and Lorenzo Patterson, performed by N.W.A.
- "Letter to Pun" contains multiple elements of "Making Love Out of Nothing At All", composed by Jim Steinman, performed by Air Supply.

== Charts ==
Chart (2005)	Peak position
US Billboard 200	188
US Top R&B/Hip-Hop Albums (Billboard)	44
US Heatseekers Albums (Billboard)	8
