= Loud Rocks =

Compilation album by various artists
- Released: September 5, 2000
- Recorded: 1999–2000
- Studios: Capitol Studios (Hollywood, CA); Track Record (North Hollywood, CA); Studio 56 (California); Encore Studios (Burbank, CA); Wayne's House (California); NRG Studios (North Hollywood, CA); 123 Studios (Peckham, UK); Conway Studios (Los Angeles, CA); Westlake Audio (Los Angeles, CA); Stankonia Recording (Atlanta, GA); Pyramid Sound Recording Studios (Ithaca, NY); Olympic Studios (Barnes, UK); The Blue Room (Woodland Hills, CA); Machine Sound; Spin Studios (Astoria, Queens, NY)
- Genres: Rap rock; nu metal; rap metal
- Length: 52:57
- Label: Loud
- Producers: Amy Finnerty; Armand Majidi; Bob Marlette; Butch Vig; Dante Ross; DJ Homicide; Epic Mazur; Incubus; John Seymour; Jose Reynoso; Josh Abraham; Machine; Rick Rubin; Sevendust; Wayne Static

Loud Rocks is a rap rock compilation album by American hip hop record label Loud Records, composed of remixes, covers and collaborations between rock and hip hop music artists. It was released on September 5, 2000 in four editions: one with explicit lyrics, a clean version, a Japanese and a Canadian version (each including a bonus track).

Recording sessions took place at Capitol Studios, Track Record, Studio 56, Encore Studios, NRG Studios, 123 Studios, Conway Studios, Westlake Audio, Stankonia Recording, Pyramid Sound Recording Studios, Olympic Studios, The Blue Room, Machine Sound, and Spin Studios.

Production was handled by Rick Rubin, Armand Majidi, Bob Marlette, Butch Vig, Dante Ross, DJ Homicide, Epic Mazur, Incubus, John Seymour, Jose Reynoso, Josh Abraham, Machine, Sevendust, Wayne Static, and Amy Finnerty, who also served as executive producer.

It features contributions from Wu-Tang Clan, Tha Alkaholiks, Big Pun, Xzibit, Chad Smith, Crazy Town, Dead Prez, Endo, Everlast, Grunge Is Dead, Incubus, Mobb Deep, M.O.P., Ozzy Osbourne, Sevendust, Shootyz Groove, Sick of It All, Static-X, Sugar Ray, System of a Down, Tom Morello and Tony Iommi.

The album debuted at number 108 on the Billboard 200 in the United States and at number 94 on the Offizielle Deutsche Charts in Germany.

== Critical reception ==
Professional ratings
Review scores
| Source | Rating |
|---|---|
| AllMusic | 3/5 stars |
| Entertainment Weekly | B+ |
| Select | 2/5 stars |
| The Guardian | 3/5 stars |
| The Village Voice | A− |

Select gave the album a two out of five rating. The review compared the album to the Judgment Night Soundtrack stating that it "did much the same thing, but it found room for curious hybrids like Teenage Fanclub and De La Soul. Only Everlast and Mobb Deep's 'Shook Ones'...shows anything like the same ambition here".

== Track listing ==
| No. | Title | Writer(s) | Producer(s) | Length |
|---|---|---|---|---|
| 1. | "Shame" (System of a Down & RZA of Wu-Tang Clan) | Dennis Coles; Robert Diggs; Lamont Hawkins; Clifford Smith; Corey Woods; Gary Grice; Jason Hunter; Russell Jones | Rick Rubin | 2:40 |
| 2. | "Make Room" (Sugar Ray & Tha Alkaholiks) | Ricardo Smith; James Robinson; Eric Brooks | DJ Homicide | 3:59 |
| 3. | "Hip-Hop" (Static-X & dead prez) | Clayton Gavin; Lavonne Alford; Vonkeli Williams; Andrew Mair | Wayne Static | 3:52 |
| 4. | "Los Angeles Times" (Endo & Xzibit) | Alvin Joiner; Melvin Bradford | Amy Finnerty; Jose "Choco" Reynoso | 4:05 |
| 5. | "Shook Ones Part II" (Everlast) | Albert Johnson; Kejuan Muchita | Dante Ross | 4:16 |
| 6. | "Wu-Tang Clan Ain't Nothing ta Fuck Wit" (Tom Morello, Chad Smith, Inspectah Deck, Method Man & RZA) | Hunter; C. Smith; Diggs; Coles; Hawkins; Woods; Grice; Jones | Rick Rubin | 3:52 |
| 7. | "Only When I'm Drunk" (Crazy Town) | R. Smith; Robinson; Brooks; August Moon; William Thomas | Epic Mazur; Josh Abraham; Shifty Shellshock (add.) | 4:54 |
| 8. | "What U See Is What U Get" (Sevendust & Xzibit) | Joiner | Sevendust | 5:12 |
| 9. | "How Bout Some Hardcore" (Grunge Is Dead & M.O.P.) | Eric Murray; Jamal Grinnage; David Brown; Bryan Vigorson | Butch Vig | 3:28 |
| 10. | "For Heaven's Sake 2000" (Ozzy Osbourne, Tony Iommi & Wu-Tang Clan) | Wu-Tang Clan; Darryl Hill; John Michael Osbourne; Anthony Frank Iommi | Bob Marlette | 4:55 |
| 11. | "Caribbean Connection" (Shootyz Groove & Big Pun) | Christopher Rios; Richard Frierson; Wyclef Jean | Machine | 3:46 |
| 12. | "Survival of the Fittest" (Sick of It All & Mobb Deep) | Johnson; Muchita | Armand Majidi; John Seymour | 3:46 |
| 13. | "Still Not a Player" (Incubus & Big Pun) | Joseph Thomas; Rodney Jerkins; Japhe Tejeda; Jolyon Skinner; Michele Williams | Incubus | 4:12 |
| Total length: | | | | 52:57 |

Canadian bonus track
| No. | Title | Length |
|---|---|---|
| 14. | "Daaam!" (Finger Eleven & Tha Alkaholiks) | 4:27 |

Japanese bonus track
| No. | Title | Length |
|---|---|---|
| 14. | "Reign of the Tec 2000" (YKZ & The Beatnuts) | 4:44 |

== Personnel ==
1. "Shame"
  - Wu-Tang Clan
    - The RZA
  - System of a Down
    - Serj Tankian – vocals
    - Daron Malakian – guitar
    - Shavo Odadjian – bass guitar
    - John Dolmayan – drums
  - Rick Rubin – producer
  - Rich Costey – mixing
  - David Schiffman – engineer
  - Choco "The Panelist" – engineer
  - Lindsay Chase – production coordinator
2. "Make Room"
  - Tha Alkaholiks
    - Tash
    - J-Ro
    - E-Swift
  - Sugar Ray
    - Mark McGrath – vocals
    - Rodney Sheppard – guitar
    - Murphy Karges – bass guitar
    - DJ Homicide – beats, vocals, producer
    - Stan Frazier – vocals, drums
    - Dave Holdredge – guitar, Pro Tools engineer
  - Dave Aron – mixing
3. "Hip Hop"
  - dead prez
    - M1
    - stic
  - Static-X
    - Wayne Static – vocals, guitar, producer, mixing
    - Ken Jay – drums
    - Tony Campos – bass guitar
    - Koichi Fukuda – guitar, programming
  - Sean Cane – mixing
  - Blair Wells – additional Pro Tools mixing and editing
4. "Los Angeles Times"
  - Xzibit
  - Endo
    - Gil Bitton – vocals
    - Zelick – bass guitar
    - Joel Swartz – drums
    - Eli Parker – guitars
  - Amy Finnerty – producer, engineer, mixing
  - Choco "The Panelist" – producer, engineer, mixing
5. "Shook Ones Part II"
  - Everlast – vocals, rhythm guitar
  - Keefus – keyboards
  - Bron Tieman – steel guitar
  - Truly Odd – DJ
  - Dante Ross – producer
  - Jamey Staub and the Stimulated Dummies – mixing
  - John Gamble – production coordinator
6. "Wu-Tang Clan Ain't Nothing ta Fuck Wit"
  - Wu-Tang Clan
    - The RZA
    - Inspectah Deck
    - Method Man
  - Tom Morello – guitar, bass guitar
  - Chad Smith – drums
  - Rick Rubin – producer
  - Rich Costey – mixing
  - David Shiffman – engineer
  - Choco "The Panelist" – engineer
  - Lindsay Chase – production coordinator
7. "Only When I'm Drunk"
  - Crazy Town
    - "Mr. Shifty" Seth Binzer – vocals, additional production
    - Epic Mazur – vocals, producer, additional production
    - Faydoedeelay – bass guitar
    - Rust Epique – guitar
    - Trouble Valli – guitar
    - DJ A.M. – turntables
    - James Bradley, Jr. – drums
  - Josh Abraham – producer, mixing
  - Brian Virtue – mixing
  - Wil Martin – side artist
  - HM Wollman – production coordinator
8. "What U See Is What U Get"
  - Xzibit
  - Sevendust
    - Lajon Witherspoon – vocals, producer
    - Clint Lowery – guitars, producer
    - John Connolly – guitars, producer
    - Vince Hornsby – bass guitar, producer
    - Morgan Rose – drums, producer
  - Sean "Big Red" Johnson – mixing, engineer
  - Matt Still – assistant and Pro Tools engineer
  - DJ Hurricane – scratching
9. "How Bout Some Hardcore"
  - M.O.P.
    - Bill
    - Fame
  - Grunge Is Dead
    - Butch Vig – loops, programming, producer, remixing
    - Billy Bush – guitars, engineer
    - Pea Podd – bass guitar
  - Cameron Webb – 2nd engineer
  - Suzanne Ybarra – production coordinator
10. "For Heaven's Sake 2000"
  - Wu-Tang Clan
  - Ozzy Osbourne – vocals
  - Tony Iommi – guitar
  - Bob Marlette – programming, keyboards, producer, mixing
  - Mark Binder – additional programming
11. "Caribbean Connection"
  - Big Pun
  - Shootyz Groove
    - Kasper Gomez – vocals
    - Season – vocals
    - Dose-Big – drums
    - Donny – guitars
    - Paul Freak – bass guitar
  - Machine – producer, mixing
12. "Survival of the Fittest"
  - Mobb Deep
    - Prodigy
    - Havoc
  - Sick of It All
    - Lou Koller – vocals
    - Pete Koller – guitar
    - Armand Majid – drums, producer, mixing
    - Craig Setari – bass guitar
  - John Seymour – producer, mixing
  - Brian Montgomery – engineer
  - Pete Benjamin – engineer
  - Jason Kanter – assistant engineer
13. "Still Not a Player"
  - Big Pun
  - Incubus
    - Brandon Boyd – vocals, producer
    - Michael Einziger – guitar, producer
    - Alex Katunich – bass guitar, producer
    - José Pasillas II – drums, producer
    - Chris Kilmore – DJ, producer
  - Rick Will – mixing
  - Dave Holdredge – mixing, engineer
  - Michael Baskette – engineer

== Charts ==
| Chart (2000) | Peak position |
|---|---|
| German Albums (Offizielle Top 100) | 94 |
| US Billboard 200 | 108 |
| US Top R&B/Hip-Hop Albums (Billboard) | 68 |
