= You Came Up =

Single by Big Pun featuring Noreaga

from the album Capital Punishment
- Released: August 22, 1998
- Genre: East Coast hip-hop; Latin hip-hop
- Length: 3:54
- Label: Loud; RCA; Terror Squad; BMG
- Songwriters: Christopher Rios, Joseph Cartagena, V. Padilla
- Producer: Rockwilder

Big Pun singles chronology
"Banned from T.V." (1998)	"You Came Up" (1998)	"Feelin' So Good" (2000)

Noreaga singles chronology
"Banned from T.V." (1998)	"You Came Up" (1998)	"Superthug" (1998)

Music video
- "You Came Up" on YouTube

"You Came Up" is a song by Puerto Rican rapper Big Pun, released as the third and final single from his album Capital Punishment. The song was produced by Rockwilder and features Noreaga. The song peaked at #49 and 43 on the Hot R&B/Hip-Hop Singles & Tracks and Hot Rap Tracks, respectively. It samples "Don't Ask Me", as performed by Ramon Morris.

== Music video ==
Directed by Darren Grant, the beginning of the video starts off with a brief snippet of "Caribbean Connection". The main video follows a James Bond theme complete with silhouettes of ladies posing and the gun barrel sequence. The video starts with the caption: Somewhere in the Tropics, with Big Pun sitting near a pool with women when he gets a call from his watch. The camera then moves up to show the New York Skyline; revealing that Big Pun is actually in New York, New York, America. It cuts to him meeting his assistant where Big Pun goes by the alias Secret Agent 747 and that his mission is to "get the disk".

It cuts to a mansion where a night party is being held and Big Pun arrives and attracts a woman who tells him something as he goes off with his business. He gets into a room upstairs from the party where he finds a computer and searches through the drawers to find a disk that he broadcasts to people downstairs through a screen. It reveals that the businessman hosting the party was performing a sex act with a male dancer. Big Pun escapes with the disk through the window as the exposed duo go after him, as he jumps off the roof of the mansion and lands. Throughout the video, Noreaga is seen in front of a house rapping the chorus with Fat Joe in the background lip syncing the chorus.

As he fights off the exposed businessman's bodyguards, Noreaga arrives by car to get Big Pun away from the exposed duo who go after them in a van. Big Pun and Noreaga throw them off guard with explosives as their driving and have seem to lost them. The exposed duo later find their car parked near an abandoned warehouse where Big Pun and Noreaga are. They appear to be shocked when they hear broken glass and the exposed duo find Big Pun standing in front of them. It turns out to be a decoy with Big Pun and Noreaga watching from afar as the duo set off a tripwire that releases a butterfly net and traps them.

The video ends with Big Pun back to where he was with the Daily World newspaper covering his face with the headline: Real Estate Developer Caught in Sex Scandal and leaves with the caption: Mission Complete. Fat Joe, Cuban Link and Angie Martinez make cameo appearances in the video.

== Charts ==
Chart (1998)	Peak position
US Bubbling Under Hot 100 (Billboard)	3
US Hot R&B/Hip-Hop Songs (Billboard)	49
US Hot Rap Songs (Billboard)	43
