= It's So Hard (Big Pun song) =

2000 single by Big Pun and Donell Jones

Single by Big Pun featuring Donell Jones

from the album Yeeeah Baby
- B-side: "Leatherface"
- Released: March 14, 2000
- Recorded: 1999
- Genre: East Coast hip-hop; Latin hip-hop
- Length: 3:30
- Label: Terror Squad; Loud
- Songwriters: Richard "Younglord" Frierson; J. Garfield; Christopher Rios
- Producer: Younglord

Big Pun singles chronology
"Feelin' So Good" (2000)	"It's So Hard" (2000)	"100%" (2000)

Donell Jones singles chronology
"U Know What's Up" (1999)	"It’s So Hard" (2000)	"Where I Wanna Be" (2000)

Music video
- "It's So Hard" on YouTube

"It’s So Hard" is the first posthumous single by American rapper Big Pun, from his 2000 second studio album, Yeeeah Baby. It features singer Donell Jones and was produced by Younglord and Jay "Waxx" Garfield, and was released following his sudden death one month prior.

The song peaked at number 75 on the Billboard Hot 100 and at number 19 on the Billboard Hot R&B/Hip-Hop Songs chart.

== Music video ==
The music video of the song was directed by Chris Robinson. The video features various cameos from Cuban Link, Triple Seis, Raekwon, Nas, Puff Daddy, Prodigy, Busta Rhymes, Jennifer Lopez, Mexicano 777 and many others.

== Charts ==
=== Weekly charts ===
Chart (2000)	Peak position
US Billboard Hot 100	75
