= Ángel Salazar =

Cuban-American comedian and actor (1956–2024)

- Salazar in 2022
- Born: March 2, 1956; Cuba
- Died: August 11, 2024 (aged 68); New York City, New York, U.S.
- Occupations: Actor; comedian
- Years active: 1976–2024

Ángel Salazar (March 2, 1956 – August 11, 2024) was a Cuban-American comedian and actor. He was known for saying "Sheck it out" ("check it out") before, during, and after jokes. As an actor, he was best known for his role as Chi-Chi in the film Scarface (1983).

== Early life ==
Salazar was born in Cuba in 1956. He left the country as a teenager, swimming to the Guantanamo Bay Naval Base and eventually settling in New York City.

== Career ==
Salazar first began performing stand-up comedy when he was eighteen, debuting his "check it out" line in his first open-mic appearance, and soon went on to acting. In his most famous role, he played Chi Chi in Scarface (1983); his other film credits included Punchline (1988) and Carlito's Way (1993). Salazar also appeared on Last Comic Standing and many HBO Comedy specials. His last film he was shooting was The Brooklyn Premiere aka "ScarFace Resurrection" by Brooklyn-born director Eric Spade Rivas, which had him reunite in scenes with Steven Bauer (Manolo from Scarface) for one more go as partners in crime. He continued to do stand-up throughout his life, with his last performance at the Reno, Nevada, location of the Laugh Factory in July 2024.

== Personal life and death ==
Salazar divided his time between Florida and New York City. On August 11, 2024, he died in a bathroom while staying at a friend's residence in Brooklyn. He was 68 and had an enlarged heart.

It was later revealed that Salazar's cause of death was the result of combined effects from cocaine, cyclobenzaprine and diphenhydramine, an antihistamine.

== Filmography ==
=== Film ===
Year	Title	Role	Notes
1979	Boulevard Nights	11th Street Gang	
1979	Walk Proud	Angel	
1980	Where the Buffalo Roam	Waiter	
1982	A Stranger Is Watching	Dude at Phone Booth	
1983	Scarface	Chi-Chi	
1984	The Wild Life	Benny	
1985	Sylvester	Tommy John	
1988	Hot to Trot	Snake	
1988	Punchline	Rico	
1990	Maniac Cop 2	Traffic Officer	
1993	Carlito's Way	Walberto	
2003	Harlem Blues	Trainer	Video
2003	Vote for Me	Machito	
2005	Rose Woes and Joe's	Hector	
2007	Made in Brooklyn	Sergio	
2009	Engaging	Angel	
2009	Trust Me	Louis	Short
2010	Crumble	S&M Partygoer	Short
2011	The Last Gamble	Angel	
2012	Da Pinche Code	Rocco	
2012	Ante	Jenti	
2012	Saved by the Pole	Big Daddy Paco	Short
2015	Laugh Killer Laugh	Cricket	
2015	Vamp Bikers Dos	Arestus	
2016	Take it Back	Ceasar	
2016	Vamp Bikers Tres	Priest	
2017	Un Delincuente en Nueva York	Jerry	
2017	The Streetz	Freddie	
2017	Tatalia	Janitor	
2018	Make America Great Again	Rogelio Yola	
2019	Counterpunch	Neighborhood Man	
2019	Japanese Borscht	El Rico	
2020	For NYC	Himself	Short
2020	The Streetz 2	Freddie	
2021	Duke of New York in New Ghost City	Ron King	
2021	Night Rapper	Lion Heart	
2022	The Black Caeser	Nino Diamond	
2023	The Gilbert Diaries: The Movie	Cha Chi	
2026	Scarface Resurrection	Chi-Chi	

=== Television ===
Year	Title	Role	Notes
1986	Heart of the City	Sparrow	Episode: "Cezanne, and Other Dreams"
1992	Showtime at the Apollo	Himself	Episode: "Episode #5.23"
2014	Screen Machines	Himself	Episode: "Scarface Cadillac"
2017	SacTown Underground	Himself	Episode: "Episode #1.11"

=== Documentary ===
Year	Title
2006	The Latin Legends of Comedy

=== Music video ===
Year	Title	Artist
1997	"I'm Not a Player"	Big Pun
