= Yeeeah Baby =

Studio album by Big Pun
- Released: April 4, 2000
- Genres: East Coast hip-hop; hardcore hip-hop; Latin hip-hop
- Length: 52:08
- Labels: Columbia`Terror Squad; SRC; Loud
- Producers: Fat Joe (executive); Just Blaze; Buckwild; L.E.S.; Sean C; DJ Shok; Richard "Younglord" Frierson; Knobody; O.Gee; Mahogany; Minnesota; Guy Boogie; KNS; the Infinite Arkatechz

Big Pun chronology
Capital Punishment (1998)	Yeeeah Baby (2000)	Endangered Species (2001)

Singles from Yeeeah Baby
- 1. "It's So Hard" Released: March 30, 2000; 2. "100%" Released: June 5, 2000

Yeeeah Baby (titled as Yeah Baby on streaming services) is the second and final studio album by rapper Big Pun, released April 4, 2000, through Columbia Records, SRC Records, Loud Records and Fat Joe's Terror Squad Productions. It debuted and peaked at number 3 on the Billboard 200, selling 179,000 units during the first week. It was subsequently certified gold in July 2000, and received platinum certification on October 31, 2017. Fat Joe served as the executive producer of the album.

Struggling with morbid obesity, Pun experienced breathing problems throughout the album's recording process, slowing down his signature flow. He died at 28 years of age, just two months before the album's release. The album, though released, was unfinished at the time of his death.

== Background ==
In his last magazine interview, conducted by Industry Insider only a week before his death, Pun detailed that his approach on Yeeeah Baby was not as "hardcore" as his previous album Capital Punishment, in an attempt to reach out to an even wider fanbase than his debut album already had.

== Reception ==
=== Commercial ===
Yeeeah Baby posted a strong debut on the Billboard 200, the album sold more than 179,000 copies in its first week in stores to take the third slot on the chart. It reached Gold status within three months.

=== Critical ===
Professional ratings
Review scores
Source	Rating
AllMusic	4/5 stars
Billboard	(Favorable)
Robert Christgau	(2-star Honorable Mention)
Entertainment Weekly	C
NME	7/10
Q	3/5 stars
RapReviews	8.5/10
Rolling Stone	3.5/5 stars
The Source	4/5 stars

Yeeeah Baby received favorable reviews from music critics.

- Rolling Stone (4/13/00, p. 128) – 3.5 stars out of 5 – "... [Pun] has gone out with a bang. He attacked standard hip-hop topics with witty, unpredictable elasticity. ... Pun is at his habanero hottest ..."
- Q (7/00, p. 111) – 3 stars out of 5 – "... Would have established [him] as both a radio-friendly commercial force and rebellious icon ..."
- CMJ (4/24/00, p. 30) – "... Beams the spotlight on the Boricua bomber's unparalleled breath control and hilarious jaw-dropping wordplay."
- Vibe (6/00, p. 214) – "... A triumphant final effort for one of the Boogie Down Bronx's favorite super-lyrical sons....[It] showcases Pun's matured artistic vision and newly mastered flows but never ceases to move bodies and minds ..."
- The Source (5/00, p. 186) – 4 mics out of 5 – "... An even more in-depth peep inside the heart and soul of a man in constant struggle with himself. ... a backstage pass to the all-out jam that was Pun's personality: street-wise, intellectually sharp, sex-crazed – and funny as hell ..."
- NME (4/29/00, p. 35) – 7 out of 10 – "... [A] raucous final musical statement. ... like a library of every cool contemporary hip-hop sound squeezed onto one compact disc. ... One for delinquent work experience boys everywhere."

== Track listing ==
Credits adapted from the album's liner notes.

No.	Title	Writer(s)	Producer(s)	Length
1.	"The Creation" (intro)			1:29
2.	"Watch Those"	Christopher Rios; Jerome Foster; Tom Scott	Knobody	3:20
3.	"Off wit His Head" (featuring Prospect and Opera Steve)	Rios; Richard Perez; Justin Smith	Just Blaze	4:06
4.	"It's So Hard" (featuring Donell Jones)	Rios; Richard Frierson; Jay Garfield	Younglord; Jay Garfield^{[a]}	2:52
5.	"We Don't Care" (featuring Cuban Link)	Rios; Felix Delgado; Frierson; Colin Blunstone; David Jones	Younglord	3:12
6.	"New York Giants" (featuring M.O.P.)	Rios; Mark Richardson; Jamal Grinnage; Eric Murray; Anne Dudley; Malcolm McLaren	Minnesota; Mahogany	3:30
7.	"My Dick" (featuring Tony Sunshine)	Rios; K. Streaks; G. Rodriguez; Eric Smith; Eric McCaine; Gino Vannelli	KNS; Guy Boogie	3:19
8.	"Leatherface"	Rios; Michael Dewar; Collin Dewar; Bill Conti; Earl Simmons; Sean Jacobs; Jason Phillips; Mason Betha; David Styles; Damon Blackman	The Infinite Arkatechz	3:25
9.	"Air Pun" (skit)			0:51
10.	"100%" (featuring Tony Sunshine)	Rios; Deleno Matthews; Lalo Schifrin	Sean Cane	3:51
11.	"Wrong Ones" (featuring Sunkiss)	Rios; DeShawn Barzey; J. Smith	Just Blaze	4:07
12.	"Laughing at You" (featuring Tony Sunshine)	Rios; Gary Scott; Steve Schiff; Keith Forsey	Ogee	4:26
13.	"Nigga Shit"	Rios; Anthony Best	Buckwild	1:45
14.	"Ms. Martin" (featuring Remi Martin)	Rios; Michael Gomez	DJ Shok	4:16
15.	"My Turn"	Rios; Leshan Lewis; Al West	L.E.S.; Al West^{[a]}	3:48
16.	"You Was Wrong" (featuring Drag-On, Fat Joe, & Remi Martin)	Rios; Gomez; Melvin Smalls	DJ Shok	3:51

Notes

- ^{^[a]} signifies a co-producer

Sample credits

- "Watch Those" contains a sample of "Gotcha (Theme from Starsky & Hutch)", written and performed by Tom Scott.
- "We Don't Care" contains excerpts from "Exclusively for Me", written by Colin Blunstone and David Jones.
- "New York Giants" contains a sample of "World Famous", written by Anne Dudley and Malcolm McLaren, performed by Malcolm McLaren.
- "My Dick" contains excerpts from "2 Hype", written by Eric Smith and Eric McCaine; and contains samples of "Jo Jo", written and performed by Gino Vannelli.
- "Leather Face" contains excerpts from "Redemption", written and performed by Bill Conti; and contains a sample from "Niggaz Done Started Something", written by Earl Simmons, Sean Jacobs, Jason Phillips, Mason Betha, David Styles, and Damon Blackman, performed by DMX featuring the Lox and Mase.
- "100%" contains samples from "Anita", written and performed by Lalo Schifrin.
- "Laughing at You" contains excerpts from "Don't You (Forget About Me)", written by Steve Schiff and Keith Forsey.

== Album chart positions ==
=== Weekly charts ===
Chart (2000)	Peak position
Canadian R&B Albums (Nielsen SoundScan)	15
US Billboard 200	3
US Top R&B/Hip-Hop Albums (Billboard)	1

=== Year-end charts ===
Chart (2000)	Position
US Billboard 200	123
US Top R&B/Hip-Hop Albums (Billboard)	45

== Singles chart positions ==
Year	Song	Chart positions			
Year	Song	Hot 100	Hot R&B/Hip-Hop Songs	Hot Rap Singles	Rhythmic Top 40
2000	"It's So Hard"	#75	#19	#11	#39
2000	"100%"	#84	#53	#16	-

== Certifications ==
Region	Certification	Certified units/sales
United States (RIAA)	Platinum	1,000,000^{‡}
^{‡} Sales+streaming figures based on certification alone.
