= 100% (Big Pun song) =

2000 single by Big Pun and Tony Sunshine

- CD single

Single by Big Pun featuring Tony Sunshine

from the album Yeeeah Baby
- Released: June 5, 2000
- Genre: Latin hip-hop; pop rap
- Length: 3:51
- Label: Terror Squad; Loud
- Songwriters: Christopher Rios; Deleno Matthews; Lalo Schifrin
- Producer: Sean Cane for The Hitmen

Big Pun singles chronology
"It's So Hard" (2000)	"100%" (2000)	"How We Roll" (2001)

Music video
- "100%" on YouTube

"100%" is the second single by American rapper Big Pun, released posthumously from his second and final studio album Yeeeah Baby (2000).

== Chart performance ==
"100%" debuted at number 79 on the US Billboard Hot R&B/Hip-Hop Songs chart for the chart week dated June 17, 2000; it went on to peak at number 64 on the US Billboard Hot R&B/Hip-Hop Songs chart, spending 16 weeks on the chart in total.

== Charts ==
Chart (2000)	Peak position
US Hot R&B/Hip-Hop Songs (Billboard)	64
