= Loon (album) =

Studio album by Loon
- Released: October 21, 2003
- Recorded: 2001–03
- Genre: Hip hop
- Length: 1:11:00
- Label: Bad Boy
- Producer: Joe Hooker (exec.); P. Diddy (also exec.); 7 Aurelius; Akon; Anthony "Scoe" Walker; Bink!; Buckwild; Conrad "Rad" Dimanche; D Nat; Fredwreck; Loon; Mario Winans; Poke & Tone; Ryan Leslie; Scott Storch; Shaft; Yogi; Younglord

Loon chronology
| Loon (2003) | No Friends (2006) |

Singles from Loon
- 1. "Down for Me" Released: 2003; 2. "How You Want That" Released: 2003

Loon is the debut studio album by American rapper Loon. It was released on October 21, 2003 via Bad Boy Records. Production was handled by Yogi, Ryan Leslie, Younglord, 7 Aurelius, then-unknown Akon, Anthony "Scoe" Walker, Bink!, Buckwild, Conrad "Rad" Dimanche, D Nat the Natural, Fredwreck, Mario Winans, P. Diddy, Shaft, Scott Storch, Trackmasters, and Loon himself. It features guest appearances from P. Diddy, Aaron Hall, Carl Thomas, Claudette Ortiz, Joe Hooker, Kelis, Mario Winans, Missy Elliott, Tammy Ruggeri, Trina and The Letter M.

The album peaked at number six on the Billboard 200 and number two on the Top R&B/Hip-Hop Albums chart. The album sold 80,000 units in its first week. "Down for Me", the single taken from the album, peaked at number 28 on the Hot R&B/Hip-Hop Singles & Tracks and number 14 on the Hot Rap Tracks.

== Critical reception ==
Professional ratings
Review scores
| Source | Rating |
|---|---|
| AllMusic | 3/5 stars |
| RapReviews | 5/10 |
| Rolling Stone | 2/5 stars |

AllMusic's Jason Birchmeier found the album overlong with its romantic hip-hop tracklist but gave credit to the production for being "always fresh, lively, and above all, poppy" concluding that Loon's debut "overall should please long time Bad Boy fans and anyone who relishes the label's refined style of lovers rap". Jon Caramanica from Rolling Stone criticized Loon's delivery for lacking variations in technique and lyrical content, and said that the deviation from R&B into "moral-laden narratives ("Story" and "Don't Wanna Die")" or "joke-poking ("This Ain't Funny")" is where his seduction works the most.

== Track listing ==
| No. | Title | Writer(s) | Producer(s) | Length |
|---|---|---|---|---|
| 1. | "P. Diddy Intro" | Chauncey Lamont Hawkins; Sean Combs; Anthony Walker | Anthony "Scoe" Walker | 0:47 |
| 2. | "How You Want That" (featuring Kelis) | Hawkins; Jeremy A. Graham; V. Jeffrey Smith; Jack Knight; Harve Pierre; Jesse Weaver Jr. | Jeremy "Yogi Bear" Graham | 4:26 |
| 3. | "Do What You Like" (featuring Trina) | Hawkins; Graham; B. Romeo | Jeremy "Yogi Bear" Graham | 3:23 |
| 4. | "Relax Your Mind" | Hawkins; Richard Frierson; Ryan Leslie; August Moon; Tyrone Thomas; Erick Sermon; Parrish Smith | Younglord; Ryan Leslie | 4:17 |
| 5. | "Down For Me" (featuring Mario Winans) | Hawkins; Mario Winans; Combs; Leslie; Shannon Lawrence; Knight; Pierre; C. Forbes | P. Diddy; Ryan Leslie | 4:20 |
| 6. | "Barbershop" (Interlude) | Hawkins; Conrad Dimanche | Loon; Conrad "Rad" Dimanche | 1:15 |
| 7. | "This Ain't Funny" | Hawkins; Jean-Claude Olivier; Samuel Barnes; Richard Martin Lloyd Walters | Poke & Tone | 3:29 |
| 8. | "Story" | Hawkins; Dimitri Christo | The Natural aka D-Nat | 3:16 |
| 9. | "Between Us" (featuring Tammy) | Hawkins; Tammy Ruggeri; LaMenga Kafi Ford; Klenord Raphael; Tijuan Frampton; Louis E. Johnson | Shaft | 4:47 |
| 10. | "Like a Movie" (featuring Claudette Ortiz) | Hawkins; Aliaune Thiam; Kandice Love; Adonis Shropshire | Akon | 4:14 |
| 11. | "Pimpin' Ken (Interlude)" | Hawkins | | 1:40 |
| 12. | "Hey Woo" (featuring Missy Elliott & P. Diddy) | Hawkins; Melissa Elliott; Roosevelt Harrell | Bink! | 3:37 |
| 13. | "Can't Talk To Her" (featuring Joe Hooker) | Hawkins; Pierre; Farid Nassar | Fredwreck | 5:22 |
| 14. | "Things You Do" (featuring Aaron Hall) | Hawkins | Mario "Yellowman" Winans | 4:06 |
| 15. | "Don't Wanna Die" | Hawkins; Frierson | Younglord | 4:28 |
| 16. | "Waiting" (featuring The Letter M) | Hawkins | 7 Aurelius | 3:46 |
| 17. | "You Don't Know" | Hawkins; Scott Storch | Scott Storch | 4:19 |
| 18. | "Friday Night" | Hawkins; Graham; Melvin Glover; Nathaniel Glover; Eddie Morris; Sylvia Robinson; Joseph Robert Saddler; Rebert Keith Wiggins; Guy Lawrence Williams; Douglas Arthur Wimbish | Jeremy "Yogi Bear" Graham | 4:00 |
| 19. | "I'll Be There" (featuring Carl Thomas) | Hawkins; Carlton Neron Thomas; Anthony Best; Harold Beatty; Edward J. Holland; Marcia Woods; Brian Holland | Buckwild | 5:21 |
| Total length: | | | | 1:11:00 |

== Personnel ==
Adapted credits from the album's booklet.

- Sean "P.Diddy" Combs: executive producer
- Harve Pierre: executive producer
- Chris Athens: mastering (Sterling Sound)
- Erik Sorensen: additional Pro Tools engineering
- Mark Pitts: associate executive producer (ByStorm Entertainment)
- Gwendolyn Niles: project manager
- Christopher Stern: creative direction

== Charts ==
Weekly chart performance for Loon
| Chart (2003) | Peak position |
|---|---|
| US Billboard 200 | 6 |
| US Top R&B/Hip-Hop Albums (Billboard) | 2 |
