= Don Cartagena =

Studio album by Fat Joe
- Released: September 1, 1998
- Studio: D&D Studios (New York, NY); Mystic Studios (Staten Island, NY); Marley Marl's House of Hits (Chestnut Ridge, NY); Soundtrack Studios (New York, NY)
- Genre: East Coast hip hop; hardcore hip hop; gangsta rap
- Label: Terror Squad; Mystic; Big Beat; Atlantic
- Producer: Armageddon; Baby Paul; Buckwild; Curt Gowdy; Dame Grease; DJ Premier; JAO; L.E.S.; Mack 10; Marley Marl; Rashad Smith; Ski Beatz; Spunk Bigga; V.I.C.; Younglord

Fat Joe chronology
Jealous One's Envy (1995)	Don Cartagena (1998)	The Album (1999)

Don Cartagena is the third studio album by American rapper Fat Joe. It was released on September 1, 1998 through Atlantic Records, Big Beat, Mystic Entertainment Group and Fat Joe's Terror Squad Productions. Production was handled by Armageddon, Baby Paul, Buckwild, Curt Gowdy, Dame Grease, DJ Premier, JAO, L.E.S., Mack 10, Marley Marl, Rashad Smith, Ski Beatz, Spunk Bigga, V.I.C. and Younglord, with Craig Kallman, Fat Joe and Greg Angelides serving as executive producers. It features guest appearances from fellow Terror Squad members Big Punisher, Armageddon, Prospect, Cuban Link and Triple Seis, as well as Charli Baltimore, Jadakiss, Krayzie Bone, Layzie Bone, Nas, Noreaga, Puff Daddy, Raekwon and Rell.

The album debuted at number seven on the US Billboard 200, selling 106,000 copies in its first week. On October 28, 1998, it was certified Gold by the Recording Industry Association of America for sales of over 500,000 units in the United States.

It was supported with two singles: "Don Cartagena" and "Bet Ya Man Can't (Triz)". Its lead single, "Don Cartagena", peaked at number 2 on the Bubbling Under Hot 100 and number 40 on the Hot R&B/Hip-Hop Songs in the US. The second single from the album, "Bet Ya Man Can't (Triz)", made it to number 54 on the US Hot R&B/Hip-Hop Songs and also marked Fat Joe's first entry on the UK singles chart, reaching number 97. Both singles featured accompanying music videos. Though not released as a single, a music video for John Blaze was made.

== Critical reception ==
Professional ratings
Review scores
Source	Rating
AllMusic	3/5 stars
Entertainment Weekly	A−
Los Angeles Times	3.5/4 stars
The New Rolling Stone Album Guide	2.5/5 stars
The Source	4/5 stars
Spin	7/10
The Village Voice	C+

Don Cartagena received generally favourable reviews from music critics. Matt Diehl of Entertainment Weekly praised the album, writing that Fat Joe's "blunt lyrical flow, infectious Latino pride, and appropriately ominous grooves make these gangsta tales explode like a sonic Scarface". Soren Baker of Los Angeles Times called it "Joe's triumphant return project", adding "Joe largely sticks to ultra-violent lyrics and gangster story lines. The album's appeal rests largely on his ability to effortlessly mix gangsterism and braggadocio. Joe's menacing voice and thunderous production create a masterful musical atmosphere that thrills and intimidates", and resumed: "a superb blend of hard-core sounds and sensibilities, Don Cartagena places Fat Joe among rap's elite".

== Track listing ==
No.	Title	Writer(s)	Producer(s)	Length
1.	"Courtroom Intro"		Mack 10	1:03
2.	"The Crack Attack"	Joseph Cartagena; Leshan Lewis	L.E.S.	2:54
3.	"Triplets" (featuring Big Punisher and Prospect)	Cartagena; Christopher Rios; Richard Perez; Damon Blackmon	Dame Grease	3:48
4.	"Find Out" (featuring Armageddon)	Cartagena; Marlon Williams	Marley Marl	3:25
5.	"Don Cartagena" (featuring Puff Daddy)	Cartagena; Richard Frierson	Younglord	3:50
6.	"My World" (featuring Big Punisher)	Cartagena; Paul Hendricks; Luther Vandross	Baby Paul	3:57
7.	"John Blaze" (featuring Nas, Big Punisher, Jadakiss and Raekwon)	Cartagena; Nasir Jones; Rios; Jason Phillips; Corey Woods; David Willis	Ski	4:50
8.	"Walk on By" (featuring Charli Baltimore and Rell)	Cartagena; Tiffany Lane; Anthony Best	Buckwild	3:58
9.	"Dat Gangsta Shit"	Cartagena; Chris Martin	DJ Premier	3:10
10.	"Bet Ya Man Can't (Triz)" (featuring Big Punisher, Cuban Link and Triple Seis)	Cartagena; Felix Delgado; Sammy Garcia; Rafael Ortiz; Cheryl Lynn; David Paich; David Foster	JAO	5:01
11.	"Misery Needs Company" (featuring Noreaga)	Cartagena; Victor Santiago; Victor Padilla	V.I.C.	4:21
12.	"The Hidden Hand" (featuring the Terror Squad)	Cartagena; Rios; Delgado; Garcia; John Eaddy; Perez; Anthony Blagman	Spunk Bigga	5:06
13.	"My Prerogative" (performed by Armageddon)	Eaddy	Armageddon	4:04
14.	"Good Times" (featuring Layzie Bone and Krayzie Bone)	Cartagena; Steven Howse; Anthony Henderson; Rashad Smith	Rashad Smith	3:46
15.	"Terror Squadians" (featuring the Terror Squad)	Cartagena; Rios; Eaddy; Perez; Richard Pimentel	Kurt Gowdy	5:07

Notes

- Track 11 is produced by Victor "V.I.C." Padilla, who is a member of Ghetto Professionals and The Beatnuts. The production credits are shared between the two production teams (Ghetto Pros & The Beatnuts) in the liner notes.

Sample credits

- Track 6 contains elements from "Don't You Know That?" written and performed by Luther Vandross.
- Track 7 contains a sample from "How High" by Method Man & Redman.
- Track 10 contains samples from "Got to Be Real" performed by Cheryl Lynn and an interpolation of "No Time" written by Kimberly Jones, Sean Combs and Steven Jordan.

== Personnel ==
- Joseph "Fat Joe" Cartagena — vocals, executive producer
- Christopher "Big Pun" Rios — vocals (tracks: 3, 6, 7, 10, 12, 15)
- Richard "Prospect" Perez — vocals (tracks: 3, 12, 15)
- John "Armageddon" Eaddy — vocals (tracks: 4, 12, 13, 15), producer & mixing (track 13)
- Sean "Puffy" Combs — vocals (track 5)
- Nasir "Nas" Jones — vocals (track 7)
- Jason "Jadakiss" Phillips — vocals (track 7)
- Corey "Raekwon" Woods — vocals (track 7)
- Tiffany "Charli Baltimore" Lane — vocals (track 8)
- Gerrell "Rell" Gaddis — vocals (track 8)
- David Anthony "Kid Capri" Love Jr. — voice (track 8)
- Felix "Cuban Link" Delgado — vocals (tracks: 10, 12, 15)
- Sammy "Triple Seis" Garcia — vocals (tracks: 10, 12)
- Lo-Key — additional vocals (track 10)
- Victor "Noreaga" Santiago — vocals (track 11)
- Steven "Layzie Bone" Howse — vocals (track 14)
- Anthony "Krayzie Bone" Henderson — vocals (track 14)
- Rodolfo "DJ Clark Kent" Franklin — scratches (track 2)
- Gerald Flowers — guitar (track 7)
- Martha Mooke — viola (track 7)
- Chris "DJ Spinbad" Sullivan — scratches (track 7)
- Larry Devore — strings arrangement (track 7)
- Barry Salter — guitar (track 8)
- Dinky Bingham — keyboards (track 8)
- Rob "Reef" Tewlow — keyboards and additional programming (track 11), co-executive producer, A&R
- Darryl McClary — keyboards and additional programming (track 11)
- Dedrick "Mack 10" Rolison — producer (track 1)
- Leshan "L.E.S." Lewis — producer & mixing (track 2)
- Damon "Dame Grease" Blackmon — producer & mixing (track 3)
- Marlon "Marley Marl" Williams — producer & engineering (track 4)
- Richard "Younglord" Frierson — producer & mixing (track 5)
- Paul Anthony "Baby Paul" Hendricks — producer & mixing (track 6)
- David "Ski" Willis — producer & mixing (track 7)
- Anthony "Buckwild" Best — producer & mixing (track 8)
- Christopher "DJ Premier" Martin — producer (track 9)
- J. "JAO" Ortiz — producer (track 10)
- Victor "V.I.C." Padilla — producer & mixing (track 11)
- Anthony "Spunk Bigga" Blagmon — producer & mixing (track 12)
- Rashad Smith — producer & mixing (track 14)
- Richard "Curt Gowdy" Pimentel — producer (track 15)
- Christian "Soundboy" Delatour — recording (tracks: 2–6, 8–14), mixing (tracks: 12, 13), mixing assistant (track 6)
- Paul Gregory — recording (track 6), recording assistant (track 8)
- Ken "Duro" Ifill — recording (track 7), mixing (tracks: 2, 7, 8)
- Dexter Thibou — recording & mixing assistant (track 9)
- Gustavo Garces — recording (track 14)
- Rich Keller — recording (track 15), mixing (tracks: 3, 15)
- Rich Travali — mixing (tracks: 5, 6, 10)
- Eddie Sancho — mixing (track 9)
- Phil Pagano — mixing (track 11)
- Romeo Antonio — mixing (track 14)
- Gregory "Gold" Wilson — recording assistant (tracks: 6, 12), mixing assistant (track 12)
- Nikos Teneketzis — recording assistant (tracks: 7, 10, 12, 13), mixing assistant (tracks: 2, 5, 7, 8, 10–14)
- Tom Hughes — recording assistant (track 11)
- Carlisle Young — mixing assistant (track 3)
- Leon Zervos — mastering
- Gregory J. Angelides — executive producer
- Craig Kallman — executive producer
- Eric Altenburger — art direction, design
- Michael Lavine — photography

== Charts ==
=== Weekly charts ===
Chart (1998)	Peak position
UK R&B Albums (OCC)	25
US Billboard 200	7
US Top R&B/Hip-Hop Albums (Billboard)	2

=== Year-end charts ===
Chart (1998)	Position
US Top R&B/Hip-Hop Albums (Billboard)	64

== Certifications ==
Region	Certification	Certified units/sales
United States (RIAA)	Gold	500,000^{^}
^{^} Shipments figures based on certification alone.
