= I'm Not a Player =

Single by Big Pun

from the album Capital Punishment
- B-side: "Wishful Thinking" (featuring Fat Joe, B-Real and Kool G Rap)
- Released: October 14, 1997
- Recorded: 1997
- Genre: East Coast hip-hop; Latin hip-hop; dirty rap
- Length: 3:41
- Label: BMG; RCA; Loud; Terror Squad
- Songwriters: Big Pun; Minnesota
- Producer: Minnesota

Big Pun singles chronology
"Off the Books" (1997)	"I'm Not a Player" (1997)	"Still Not a Player" (1998)

Music video
- "I'm Not a Player" on YouTube

"I'm Not a Player" is the debut single from rapper Big Pun (then known as Big Punisher), produced by Minnesota. The song peaked at number 57 of the Billboard Hot 100. "I'm Not a Player" helped the album become number one on the Billboard Top R&B/Hip-Hop Albums chart, selling more than one million copies in America.

== Music video ==
The video, inspired by Scarface, features Big Pun buying a red Mercedes-Benz and walking through a restaurant. Big Pun is seen dancing with ladies. Fat Joe, Noreaga, Cuban Link, Raekwon, Prodigy, Armageddon, Triple Seis, Prospect, The O'Jays (whose Darling Darling Baby was sampled in I'm Not A Player), and Angel Salazar make cameo appearances.

== Charts ==
Chart (1997)	Peak position
US Hot Rap Songs (Billboard)	3
US Billboard Hot 100	57
US Hot R&B/Hip-Hop Songs (Billboard)	19

Chart (1998)	Peak position
New Zealand (Recorded Music NZ)	34
