= How We Roll (Big Pun song) =

Single by Big Pun featuring Ashanti

from the album Endangered Species
- Released: February 7, 2001
- Recorded: 1998 (Big Pun’s vocals & Basic tracks)
- Genre: East Coast hip hop; Latin hip hop
- Length: 3:39
- Label: Loud
- Songwriters: Christopher Rios, Irv Gotti, P. Walcott
- Producers: Irv Gotti, Tru Stylze

Big Pun singles chronology
"100%" (2000)	"How We Roll" (2001)

Ashanti singles chronology
"Pov City Anthen" (2001)	"How We Roll" (2001)	"Just Like a Thug" (2001)

Music video
- "How We Roll" on YouTube

"How We Roll" is the only single by late American rapper Big Pun from his posthumous compilation album, Endangered Species (2001). It features production by Irv Gotti and guest vocals by his protégé Ashanti, who performs the chorus and outro. The accompanying animated music video serves as a tribute to Pun following his death. The song peaked at number 53 on the Hot R&B/Hip-Hop Singles & Tracks and at number 16 on the Hot Rap Songs.

== Track listing ==
1. "How We Roll" (Radio Version)
2. "How We Roll" (Squeaky Clean)
3. "How We Roll" (Album Version)
4. "How We Roll" (Instrumental)
