= Amy Finnerty (entrepreneur) =

American executive

Amy Finnerty is an American executive. She is the Chief Innovation Officer at The Pattern. Finnerty is cited as getting the music video "Smells Like Teen Spirit" by Nirvana into rotation on MTV.

== Career ==
Finnerty was a coordinator in the MTV music programming department when she started listening to Bleach by Nirvana. She went to see them at the Pyramid Club with music executive Janet Billig in 1989. She said about that night that “it was such an incredible show. It didn’t start till long after midnight and there couldn’t have been more than twenty or thirty people there, but Kurt Cobain still broke his guitar at the end.” In 1991, Nirvana released the album Nevermind and their first single, "Teen Spirit" had an accompanying music video. According to the New York Times, Finnerty championed the music video. "When the video of 'Teen Spirit' came in, I ran around the halls and began showing it to everyone...I took it into the Monday meeting and people responded." “I was still low on the totem pole, but they realized that I was the only one in the demographic they were going for. The other people there had all been there for ten years and thought that artists like Phil Collins were what kids wanted to hear.” Finnerty is quoted in American Songwriter as saying “It made MTV very successful. It gave [MTV] a whole new platform to work from, and a whole new generation to sell to.” It also catapulted Finnerty at work. She became the main liaison for Nirvana with MTV. When Nirvana recorded their MTV Unplugged at the Sony Music Studios in New York City on November 18, 1983, Cobain asked Finnerty to seat their friends in the front row, in the event he got nervous, he could look at them.

Finnerty is also credited with championing bands such as Pearl Jam, Temple of the Dog, Smashing Pumpkins and more. She eventually became the VP of Music Programming at MTV.

Finnerty was the executive producer of Loud Rocks, which was a compilation album featuring Ozzy Osbourne, Wu-Tang Clan and other artists in 2000. Finnerty referred to the project as "anti-establishment music."

In 2012, Finnerty became SVP of Talent at Maker Studios. She worked with YouTubers such as KassemG, PewDiePie, and ShayCarl.

In 2021, she joined her former Maker Studios colleague, Lisa Donovan, to become the Chief Innovation Officer at The Pattern.
