= Still Not a Player =

1998 single by Big Pun

Single by Big Pun featuring Joe

from the album Capital Punishment
- B-side: "Twinz (Deep Cover 98)"
- Released: March 28, 1998
- Recorded: 1997
- Genre: East Coast hip-hop; pop-rap
- Length: 3:56
- Label: Loud; RCA
- Songwriters: Christopher Rios; Jerome Foster
- Producers: Knobody; Dahoud Darien

Big Pun singles chronology
"I'm Not a Player" (1997)	"Still Not a Player" (1998)	"Banned from T.V." (1998)

Joe singles chronology
"Good Girls" (1997)	"Still Not a Player" (1998)	"All That I Am" (1998)

Music video
- "Still Not a Player" on YouTube

"Still Not a Player" is a song by American rapper Big Pun, released on March 28, 1998 as the second single from his debut album Capital Punishment (1998). The song was produced by Knobody and features R&B singer Joe.

== Composition ==
"Still Not a Player" is an East Coast hip-hop and pop-rap song, that remixes Big Pun's debut single, "I'm Not a Player" (1997). The song was produced by Minnesota and contains an interpolation of Joe's "Don't Wanna Be a Player". It also samples "A Little Bit of Love" by Brenda Russell. In addition to samples, the song contains interpolations of Earth, Wind & Fire's "Brazilian Rhyme (Beijo)"; towards the end of the song, the refrain "Punisher...Punisher...Punisher, Big Punisher" is sung to the tune and rhythm of the lead vocals from the track.

== Chart performance ==
The song peaked at No. 24 on the Billboard Hot 100 and at No. 6 on the Billboard Hot R&B/Hip-Hop Songs chart, making it the most successful single released by Big Pun. It was ranked the 108th best song of 1980-2005 by Blender magazine, and was ranked #76 on VH1's list of the 100 Greatest Hip Hop Songs.

== Music video ==
Fat Joe, Cormega, Onyx, the Beatnuts, Guru, Tony Touch and Loud Records R&B artist Davina all made featured appearances in the music video as cameos.

== Critical reception ==
Rolling Stone ranked the song at number 39 on their "The 100 Best East Coast Hip-Hop Songs of All Time", praising its "cheery piano loop" and Pun's "nimble verses" that are "truly impressive." They conclude "Still Not a Player" being repurposed in songs by artists, such as Davido and YoungBoy Never Broke Again, are "a testament to its solid place in the pop-rap canon." Carl Lamarre of Billboard included the song on his "Here Are 20 Hip-Hop Songs That Turn 20 In 2018" list. He credited Pun's "charm" and "swagger" as the "icing on this sweet-sounding track."

== Personnel ==
Credits for Capital Punishment adapted from the album liner notes.

- Denise Barbarita – assistant engineer
- Carlos Bess – mixing
- Big Pun – executive producer, primary artist
- Sean Cane – A&R
- Chris Conway – mixing
- Dr. Dre – producer
- Dahoud – producer
- Danny O – producer
- dead prez – producer
- Domingo – producer
- "E" – mixing
- EQ – producer
- Fat Joe – executive producer
- Paul Gregory – assistant engineer
- Che Harris – A&R coordination
- Daniel "PhotoChop" Hastings
- Troy Hightower – mixing
- Tom Hughes – assistant engineer
- Ken "Duro" Ifil – engineer
- Joe – featured artist
- Ju-Ju – producer
- Jugrnaut – producer
- Knobody – producer
- Ola Kudu – creative direction
- Adam Kudzin – engineer
- L.E.S. – producer
- Matt Life – executive producer
- Laurie Marks – A&R coordination
- Mike D. – A&R
- Minnesota – producer
- Nastee – engineer
- Frank Nitty – producer
- Nomad – producer
- Roc Raida – scratches
- Rockwilder – producer
- RZA – producer
- Schott Free – A&R
- Tony Smalios – engineer, mixing
- Showbiz – producer
- Soundboy – engineer, mixing
- Kevin Stone – assistant engineer
- Nikos Teneketzis – mixing assistant
- Kieran Walsh – engineer
- Gregory "Gold" Wilson – assistant engineer
- Ted Wohlsen – mixing
- Trauma – producer
- Young Lord – producer
- Leon Zervos – mastering
- Mike Zulu – producer

== Charts ==
=== Weekly charts ===
Chart (1998)	Peak position
US Billboard Hot 100	24
US Hot R&B/Hip-Hop Songs (Billboard)	6
US Rhythmic Airplay (Billboard)	5
New Zealand (Recorded Music NZ)	34

=== Year-end charts ===
Chart (1998)	Position
US Billboard Hot 100	85

== Certifications ==
Certifications for "Still Not a Player"
Region	Certification	Certified units/sales
New Zealand (RMNZ)	3× Platinum	90,000^{‡}
^{‡} Sales+streaming figures based on certification alone.

== Big Pun and Incubus version ==
"Still Not a Player"

Song by Big Pun and Incubus

from the album Loud Rocks
- Released: September 5, 2000
- Recorded: 1999–2000
- Genre: Rap rock; nu metal; rap metal
- Length: 4:12
- Label: Loud
- Songwriters: Christopher Rios; Jerome Foster
- Producers: Brandon Boyd; Michael Einziger; Alex Katunich; José Pasillas II; Chris Kilmore

American rock band Incubus remixed the song with Big Pun's vocals on the rap rock compilation album, Loud Rocks, released seven months after his death on September 5, 2000. As with his other collaboration on the album, "Caribbean Connection", there are no new vocals from Pun, only samples from the original two songs. "Still Not a Player" was produced by five all members of Incubus, and is one of the last examples of their hip-hop influenced nu metal sound, going in a softer, alternative rock and pop rock direction on their following albums.

=== Critical reception ===
"Still Not a Player" received mixed reviews from music critics; Sophie Maughan of Loudwire included the remix on her "20 Nu-Metal Covers of Popular Songs" list, calling it proof "rap and rock can successfully collide to create some magic." Complex also included the song on their "The Best Rap-Rock Songs" list, praising the "scintillating version of this Pun classic" as a highlight of Loud Rocks.

David Browne of Entertainment Weekly was less impressed, feeling the remix's "generic rap-metal" was a downgrade from the "big-poppa flow" of Big Pun's original.

=== Personnel ===
- Big Pun
- Incubus
  - Brandon Boyd – vocals, producer
  - Michael Einziger – guitar, producer
  - Alex Katunich – bass guitar, producer
  - José Pasillas II – drums, producer
  - Chris Kilmore – DJ, producer
- Rick Will – mixing
- Dave Holdredge – mixing, engineer
- Michael Baskette – engineer

== Cover versions and samples ==
In the Up in Smoke Tour in 2000, Snoop Dogg and Dr. Dre played this song as a tribute to Big Pun.

A demo version of the song featuring former Terror Squad member Cuban Link leaked 14 years after the song's initial release.

The song was sampled in Ariana Grande's 2013 single "The Way", which also samples Brenda Russell's "A Little Bit of Love".
