= Knobody =

American record producer

- Born: Jerome Foster
- Origin: New York City, U.S.
- Genres: R&B, hip hop
- Occupations: Record producer, A&R
- Years active: 1993–present

Jerome Foster, better known as Knobody, is an American music producer and A&R. Knobody has produced records across different genres including soul, R&B, hip hop and rock for several multi-platinum artists including Jay-Z, Ne-Yo, Akon, The Game, Big Pun, Mýa and R.E.M. Knobody worked as an A&R at SRC Records/Universal. Due to the enormous success Akon experienced following the release of his debut album, Knobody was recognized as a World Top 10 A&R. He is not to be confused with Bay Area rapper/producer and Hieroglyphics crew affiliate who also goes by the name Knobody.

== Recognition ==
Knobody has helped launching careers of artists like Jay-Z, Akon Big Pun. His contributions to these artists' careers has had an enormous impact on the world of hip hop and R&B.

=== Jay-Z ===
Knobody produced the classic single "Can't Knock the Hustle" for Jay-Z, the first track on the artist's debut album Reasonable Doubt. "Can't Knock the Hustle" was Jay-Z's first chart single, bringing the rapper into the limelight and jump starting a career that has resulted in millions of album sales worldwide. Since 1996, Jay-Z has released hundreds of records, yet "Can't Knock the Hustle" - praised by many as a "classic" - lives on to be recognized as one of the greatest songs he has ever recorded. As Steve Juon of RapReviews.com describes, "Knobody put together an incredibly smooth opening track for Jay that became the mantra of his career."

=== Big Pun ===
Knobody produced "Still Not a Player", the lead single from Big Pun's first album, Capital Punishment, which debuted at #5 on the Billboard 200 charts and became the first album by a solo Latino rap artist to reach the platinum sales mark. "Still Not a Player" is credited with taking Big Pun from underground obscurity into super-stardom. MTV's Andrea Duncan writes, "Big Pun made his name in the hip-hop underground, and then, in 1998, rode the made-for-radio vibe of 'Still Not a Player' to the top of the R&B chart and full-blown rap stardom." As stated in All Music Guide to Hip Hop by Vladimir Bogdanov, "Big Pun's solo debut, 'Capital Punishment', was released in 1998 and debuted in the Top Five thanks to 'Still Not a Player,' a club-ready remix of 'I'm Not a Player' that proved massively popular." Riding the wave of success created by "Still Not a Player", Big Pun's debut album "Capital Punishment" was nominated for Rap Album of the Year at the 1999 GRAMMY Awards. In the May/June 2006 issue of Scratch Magazine, "Still Not a Player" was named one of hip hop's 25 greatest remixes of all time.

=== Akon ===
During his time as an A&R at SRC Records/Universal, Knobody was responsible for breaking Akon as an artist and developing his first album, Trouble. Knobody produced Akon's radio hit, "Locked Up" (Remix) featuring Styles P, a contribution that proved to have an enormous impact on the success of the album and the artist. Johnny Loftus of All Music Guide proclaims, "The success of the song 'Locked Up' raised Akon's profile..." Trouble was certified platinum by the RIAA on April 27, 2005, as Akon became a bona fide R&B star. Due to the enormous success Akon experienced following the release of his debut album, Knobody was recognized as a World Top 10 A&R in 2005.

== Production credits ==
=== Singles ===
1993: "So Whatcha Want?" (MF Grimm)
1995: "Funky Piano" (E. Bros) New Jersey Drive Soundtrack
1996: "Can't Knock the Hustle" (Jay-Z f/Mary J. Blige)
1997: "How You Want It" (Jungle Brothers f/De La Soul & Q-Tip)
1998: "Still Not a Player" (Big Pun f/Joe)
1998: "Movin' Out" (Mýa f/ Raekwon & Noreaga)
2002: "I've Been High" (R.E.M.)
2004: "Locked Up (Remix)" (Akon f/Styles P)
2004: "Coo Coo Chee" (Ric-A-Che)
2006: "Feels So Good" (Remy Ma f/Ne-Yo)
2008: "Game's Pain" (The Game f/Keyshia Cole)

=== Songs ===
Artist	Song title	Album	Record label
Akon f/Styles P	"Locked Up" (Remix)	Trouble	SRC/Universal
Angie Martinez f/Jadakiss, Styles P, Beanie Sigel, Bret & Kool G Rap	"Live from the Streets"	Up Close and Personal	Elektra Records
Angie Martinez f/Busta Rhymes	"Gutter 2 the Fancy Ish"	Up Close and Personal	Elektra Records
BarberShop 2: Back in Business Soundtrack	"Thing's Come & Go"	BarberShop 2: Back in Business Soundtrack	Interscope
Big Pun	"Watch Those"	Yeeeah Baby	Loud Records
Big Pun f/Joe	"Still Not a Player"	Capital Punishment	Loud Records
Black Eye	"Blue Black"	n/a	H-Bomb Records
Bounty Killer f/Noreaga	"Next Millennium"	Next Millennium	VP Records/TVT Records
Call O' Da Wild	"Clouds of Smoke"	Bad Boys Soundtrack	Columbia
E. Bros	"Funky Piano"	New Jersey Drive Soundtrack	Tommy Boy Records
Flo Rida f/Ludacris & Gucci Mane	"Why You Up In Here"	The Only One	Poe Boy/Atlantic
Funkmaster Flex f/Ginuwine	"How Would You Like It"	60 Minutes of Flex, Vol. 4	Loud Records
The Game f/Keyshia Cole	"Game's Pain"	L.A.X.	Geffen/Interscope
G. Dep	"Keep It Gangsta"	Child of the Ghetto	Bad Boy
Grenique	"Love Within"	Black Butterfly	UMG
Jay-Z f/Mary J. Blige	"Can't Knock the Hustle"	Reasonable Doubt	Roc-A-Fella
Joell Ortiz f/Fat Joe	"One Shot"	Free Agent	SRC Records/Universal Motown
Jungle Brothers f/De La Soul & Q-Tip	"How You Want It"	Raw Deluxe	Priority
Kelis	"Like You"	Kelis Was Here	Jive
Kool G Rap f/Havoc	"Thug Chronicals"	The Giancana Story	Rawkus
Lil' Kim	"Who's Number One"	The Notorious K.I.M.	Atlantic
Mýa	"Fear of Flying"	Fear of Flying	Interscope
Mýa f/Raekwon & Noreaga	"Moving Out"	Belly Soundtrack	Def Jam
Mýa f/Sean Paul	"Things Come & Go"	Moodring	Interscope
Ne-Yo f/Jennifer Hudson	"Leaving Tonight"	Because of You	Def Jam
O.G.C.	"Boot Camp MFC Eastern Conference"	The M-Pire Strikez Back	Duck Down
Paula Perry	"Paula's Jam" remix	Paula's Jam	Loose Cannon/Polygram
Queen Pen	"The Set Up"	My Melody	Interscope
Rah Digga	"The Intro"	Dirty Harriet	Elektra Records
R.E.M.	"I've Been High"	r.e.m.IX	Warner Bros.
R.E.M.	"The Lifting"	r.e.m.IX	Warner Bros.
Remy Ma f/Ne-Yo	"Feels So Good"	There's Something about Remy: Based on a True Story	SRC/Universal
Ric-A-Che	"Belve"	Lack of Communication	SRC/Universal
Ric-A-Che	"Coo Coo Chee"	Lack of Communication	SRC/Universal
Ric-A-Che	"Dirty Midwest"	Lack of Communication	SRC/Universal
Ric-A-Che	"Hustla Til"	Lack of Communication	SRC/Universal
Ric-A-Che	"Lil Bro"	Lack of Communication	SRC/Universal
Ric-A-Che	"Ugly"	Lack of Communication	SRC/Universal
Ric-A-Che	"War Times"	Lack of Communication	SRC/Universal
Ric-A-Che	"Who Want To Do"	Lack of Communication	SRC/Universal
Ric-A-Che	"So Cold"	Lack of Communication	SRC/Universal
Rough House Survivors	"You Got It (Remix)"	n/a	MCA
Tash f/Carl Thomas	"The Game"	Rap Life	Loud Records
Toshinobu Kubota f/Caron Wheeler	"Just the Two of Us"	n/a	Columbia
X-Ecutioners f/M.O.P.	"Let It Bang"	Built From Scratch	Loud Records

== Awards ==
Hit Quarters named Knobody a "World Top 10 A&R" in 2005 as a result of his involvement in Akon's career-launching album Trouble. In 2008, Knobody was awarded a GRAMMY for "Leaving Tonight", his contribution to Ne-Yo's Because of You album, which won the 2007 GRAMMY Award for Best Contemporary R&B Album.
