= Richard Frierson =

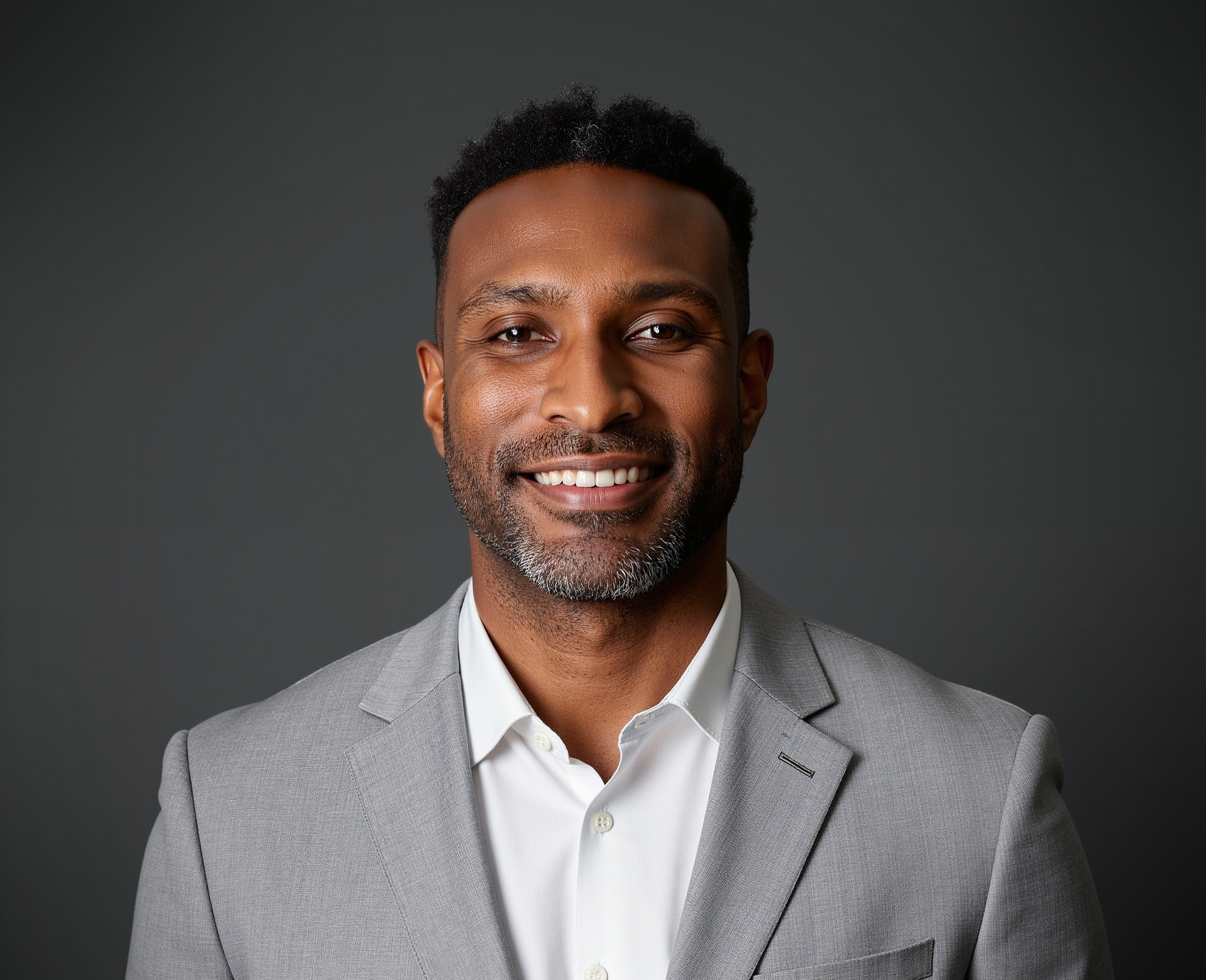
- Frierson in 2025

Background information
- Also known as: Younglord
- Born: Richard Frierson; July 9, 1978 (age 47); New York City, U.S.
- Origin: New York City, U.S.
- Genres: R&B; hip hop
- Occupations: Record producer; entrepreneur; business strategist; executive coach
- Years active: 1996–present
- Labels: Belltree Hitz; Bad Boy; Young World Industries; The 1080 Corp.
- Member of: The Hitmen
- Website: www.unstuckglobal.com/richard-frierson

Richard Frierson (born July 9, 1978), known professionally as Younglord, is an American record producer and entrepreneur. He was an early member of The Hitmen, the in-house production team for Puff Daddy's Bad Boy Records, contributing to albums including No Way Out (1997) by Puff Daddy and Harlem World (1997) by Mase, both of which reached number one on the Billboard 200. In the later years, he founded the music licensing company License to Rock. In 2025, Frierson expanded into business consulting and executive coaching with the launch of Unstuck Global.

== Career ==
=== Music Production ===
Frierson began his career as a teenager in New York City when he joined Sean Combs’ Hitmen production team in 1994. He produced tracks for artists including Mase, The Lox, Faith Evans, and 112. In 2000, he was the credited producer of Big Pun’s posthumous single "It's So Hard", which reached the Billboard Hot 100. He later co-produced Puff Daddy’s 2006 single "Come to Me", which peaked at number 9 on the U.S. Billboard Hot 100 Singles Sales chart.

=== Mentorship and Talent Development ===
Beyond production, Frierson has been involved in developing emerging talent. He was among those who helped introduce Ryan Leslie to Sean Combs following their collaboration on "Keep Giving Your Love to Me" for the Bad Boys II soundtrack. He also worked with songwriters and producers such as Keith Harris and Chris Henderson, who later achieved mainstream success.

=== Music Licensing ===
In 2014, Frierson founded The Truth Music Licensing. The Truth controls a catalog of over 5,000 songs and has licensed music to major movie studios, networks, and high-profile brands.

License To Rock is the rebranding of The Truth Music Library. This rebranding consists of a major expansion and a partnership with a high profile music label. These changes put LTR in position to build a massive catalog and become a dominant force in the licensing space. Some of License To Rock's placements have been with Mona Scott's "Love & Hip Hop" franchises, Lee Daniels' "STAR" & "EMPIRE" and commercials for brands including Gatorade, Pepsi, and AT&T.

=== Business Consulting ===
In 2025, Frierson expanded his work in leadership and organizational strategy by formally launching Unstuck Global, described in business media coverage as a performance advisory firm for executives and entrepreneurs. Outlets such as The Globe and Mail and AP News reported on the firm's focus on leadership coaching, organizational performance, and executive development.

== Discography ==
=== 1990s ===
- 1997: Puff Daddy – No Way Out
- 1997: Mase – Harlem World
- 1997: Big Pun – You Ain't A Killer
- 1997: Soul in the Hole soundtrack
- 1997: Big Pun – Caribbean Connection
- 1997: The Notorious B.I.G.- Hypnotize
- 1998: Big Pun – Capital Punishment
- 1998: Fat Joe – Don Cartagena
- 1998: Faith Evans – Keep The Faith
- 1998: 112 – Room 112
- 1998: The Lox – Money, Power, Respect
- 1999: Tash – Rap Life
- 1999: Black Rob – I Dare You

=== 2000s ===
- 2000: Lil Kim – The Notorious K.I.M.
- 2000: Big Pun – Yeeeah Baby
- 2000: Big Pun – It's So Hard
- 2000: Girlfight Soundtrack
- 2000: LL Cool J – Leave It On The Floor (Gatorade Commercial)
- 2001: Fat Joe – J.O.S.E.
- 2001: Fat Joe – He's Not Real
- 2002: Grand Theft Auto: Vice City
- 2002: LL Cool J – Big Mama Remix
- 2002: Kool G Rap – The Giancana Story
- 2003: LL Cool J – 10
- 2003: Loon – Loon
- 2003: Beyoncé – Keep Giving Your Love To Me
- 2003: Bad Boys Soundtrack
- 2004: New Edition – One Love
- 2004: Virtue – Nothing But The Hits
- 2004: Pitch Black Law
- 2005: Ginuwine – Back II da Basics
- 2006: Diddy – Press Play
- 2006: Lloyd Banks – Gilmore's
- 2006: Diddy – Come To Me
- 2006: Lloyd Banks – Rotten Apple
- 2006: Blowin Up: The Album
- 2007: Consequence – Don't Quit Your Day Job
- 2007: Cheri Dennis – In And Out Of Love
- 2007: Paula DeAnda – Easy
- 2008: Dem Franchise Boyz – Our World, Our Way
- 2009: Notorious (Original Soundtrack)

=== 2010s ===
- 2010: Big Tunes: Destination Dance
