= Tony Sunshine =

Singer

- Born: April 23, 1977 (age 49); New York City, New York, U.S.
- Genres: R&B, hip hop
- Occupation: Singer
- Years active: 1998–present
- Formerly of: Terror Squad

Antonio Cruz (born April 23, 1977), known professionally as Tony Sunshine, is an American R&B singer of Puerto Rican descent. He is best known as a member of Fat Joe's hip hop group Terror Squad in the late 1990s, and notably guest appeared on group cohort Big Pun's 2000 single, "100%" and also appeared on Cuban Link's single "Still Telling Lies" that same year. His guest appearance alongside Armageddon on Fat Joe's 2003 single, "All I Need" peaked at number 54 on the Billboard Hot 100, while his guest appearance on Lumidee's 2007 cover "She's Like the Wind" peaked at number 43 on the chart. He was led by Joe to sign with Jive Records to release his 2004 debut single "Oh My God" (featuring Diddy and Dirtbag), which failed to chart.

== Early life ==
Raised in the Bronx, Cruz was discovered by fellow Bronx native Fat Joe at the age of thirteen, who attempted to secure a recording contract for the teen. Cruz then adopted the name Tony Sunshine, and ultimately became a member of Terror Squad. Fat Joe, the group's leader, said he respected and understood Cruz's talent.

== Career ==
Cruz performed vocals for Terror Squad cohort Big Pun, on his songs "100%", "Laughin at You", and "My Dick". He has also appeared on Fat Joe's songs "TS Piece" and "All I Need". Terror Squad's self-titled debut album was released in 1999, on which Cruz made numerous appearances. Cruz has also appeared on Cuban Link's 24K album, contributing vocals to the tracks "Freak Out", "Still Telling Lies", "Hey Mama", and "Taste of Pastry".

Cruz signed with Jive Records to release his 2004 single "Oh My God", which failed to chart. Fat Joe was then able to finalize a record deal for Cruz in 2005 with Epic and Sony BMG, although he was dropped in May of the following year and subsequently signed to Urban Box Office. In November 2006, the label collapsed and left Cruz as an independent artist. In 2007, he guest featured on fellow New York singer Lumidee's single, "She's Like the Wind". As well as the English version, a Spanglish version was also recorded.

In 2010, he independently released the single "Say Hey" (featuring Swizz Beatz) in July of that year. In 2015, Cruz released the mixtape No Filter. In 2016, Cruz reunited with Fat Joe and Terror Squad, although this resulted in no major releases.

== Discography ==
=== Singles ===
- 2003: "Grey Goose" (featuring Fat Joe)
- 2004: "Oh My God" (featuring Diddy and Dirtbag)
- 2010: "Say Hey"
- 2011: "#1 Baby"
- 2013: "Don't Deserve"
- 2015: "Crying"
- 2016: "Danger" (featuring Chris Rivers)
- 2017: "Talk About it"
- 2018: "Take Me Away"
- 2019: "Bruce Leroy"
- 2019: "Shots Fired"
- 2020: "Wandas Son" (featuring Dre of Cool & Dre)
- 2021: "You Said"

=== Featured singles ===
- 1999: "Spanish Fly" (Dyme featuring Cuban Link and Tony Sunshine)
- 2000: "100% (Big Pun featuring Tony Sunshine)
- 2000: "Still Telling Lies" (Cuban Link featuring Tony Sunshine)
- 2003: "All I Need" (Fat Joe featuring Tony Sunshine and Armageddon)
- 2004: "Talkin' Gangsta" (AZ featuring Tony Sunshine)
- 2007: "She's Like the Wind" (Lumidee featuring Tony Sunshine)
- 2025: "Let Me Know" (Bun B featuring Tony Sunshine)

=== Mixtapes ===
- 2015: No Filter
