= Terror Squad: The Album =

The Album

Studio album by Terror Squad
- Released: September 21, 1999
- Recorded: 1998–1999
- Genre: Hip-hop
- Length: 66:31
- Label: Terror Squad; Mystic; Big Beat; Atlantic
- Producer: Alchemist; Arkatech Beatz; Armageddon; Buckwild; Dirtman; DJ Noodles; Don "A.P." Sellers; JuJu; LA' Smouve; Ron "Amen-Ra" Lawrence; V.I.C.; Yogi "Sugar Bear" Graham; Younglord

Terror Squad chronology
The Album (1999)	True Story (2004)

Singles from The Album
- 1. "Whatcha Gon Do" Released: August 10, 1999

Professional ratings
Review scores
Source	Rating
AllMusic	3/5 stars
Entertainment Weekly	B+
Rap Pages	B
RapReviews	7.5/10
The Source	3.5/5 stars
Vibe	(Mixed)

Terror Squad: The Album is the debut studio album by American hip-hop group Terror Squad. It was released on September 21, 1999, through Fat Joe's Terror Squad Productions, Mystic Entertainment, Big Beat Records, and Atlantic Records. Production was handled by Armageddon, The Alchemist, Buckwild, Dirtman, DJ Noodles, Don "A.P." Sellers, JuJu, LA' Smouve, Ron "Amen-Ra" Lawrence, The Infinite Arkatechz, V.I.C., Yogi "Sugar Bear" Graham and Younglord, with Craig Kallman, Fat Joe and Greg Angelides serving as executive producers. It features guest appearances from Buju Banton, Keith Nut and The Bleach Brothers, as well as contributions from Tony Sunshine, who later joined the group's line-up.

The album debuted at number 22 on the Billboard 200 and number 4 on the Top R&B/Hip-Hop Albums charts in the United States.

== Track listing ==
No.	Title	Writer(s)	Producer(s)	Length
1.	"In for Life"	Christopher Rios; Samuel Garcia; Richard Perez; Felix Delgado; Ronald Lawrence	Ron "Amen-Ra" Lawrence	4:29
2.	"Pass the Glock"	Garcia; Delgado; John Eaddy; Perez; Rios; Joseph Cartagena; Jeremy Graham	Yogi "Sugar Bear" Graham	4:00
3.	"'99 Live"	Perez; Alan Maman	Alchemist	4:13
4.	"Whatcha Gon Do?"	Rios; Jerry Tineo	JuJu	3:20
5.	"Triple Threat"	Eaddy; Rios; Delgado; Michael Dewar; Collin Dewar	The Infinite Arkatechz	4:03
6.	"War"	Garcia; Victor Padilla	V.I.C.	3:05
7.	"Bring It On"	Cartagena; Maman	Alchemist	3:54
8.	"As the World Turns"	Delgado; Perez; Garcia; E. Lora	DJ Noodles	4:32
9.	"Gimme Dat"	Eaddy	Armageddon	3:37
10.	"Feelin' This"	Eaddy; Perez; Rios	Armageddon	4:20
11.	"All Around the World"	Delgado; Don Sellers	Don "A.P." Sellers	3:59
12.	"Tell Me What U Want"	Cartagena; Eaddy; Delgado; Richard Frierson	Younglord	4:45
13.	"Rudeboy Salute" (featuring Buju Banton)	Cartagena; Mark Myrie; Rios; Anthony Best	Buckwild	4:14
14.	"My Kinda Girls"	Antonio Cruz; Delgado; J. Wilson	LA' Smouve	3:56
15.	"Payin' Dues" (featuring Keith Nut)	John Eaddy; Keith Joynes	Armageddon	3:51
16.	"www.thatsmyshit.com" (featuring The Bleach Brothers)	Cartagena; Garcia; G. Rado; J. Noack	Dirtman	6:13
Total length:				66:31

== Personnel ==
Terror Squad

- Felix "Cuban Link" Delgado – vocals (tracks: 1, 2, 5, 8, 11, 12, 14), mixing (track 11)
- Christopher "Big Pun" Rios – vocals (tracks: 1, 2, 4, 5, 10, 13)
- John "Armageddon" Eaddy – vocals (tracks: 2, 5, 9, 10, 12, 15), producer (tracks: 9, 10, 15)
- Richard "Prospect" Perez – vocals (tracks: 1–3, 8, 10)
- Sammy "Triple Seis" Garcia – vocals (tracks: 1, 2, 6, 8, 16)
- Joseph "Fat Joe" Cartagena – vocals (tracks: 2, 7, 12, 13, 16), executive producer
- Antonio "Tony Sunshine" Cruz – vocals (tracks: 8, 12, 14)

Additional personnel

- Mark "Buju Banton" Myrie – vocals (track 13)
- Keith Keith/Keith Nut – vocals (track 15)
- Dirtman – vocals & producer (track 16)
- Reka – vocals (track 16)
- Ron "Amen-Ra" Lawrence – keyboards & producer (track 1)
- Moise Laporte – keyboards & piano (track 1)
- Chauncey Mahan – keyboards (track 13)
- Jeremy A. "Yogi Bear" Graham – producer & mixing (track 2)
- Alan "The Alchemist" Maman – producer & mixing (tracks: 2, 7)
- Jerry "JuJu" Tineo – producer & mixing (track 4)
- Michael "Mike Trauma D" Dewar – producer (track 5)
- Collin "Jugrnaut" Dewar – producer (track 5)
- Victor "V.I.C." Padilla – producer (track 6)
- DJ Noodles – producer & mixing (track 8)
- Don "A.P." Sellers – producer (track 11)
- Richard "Younglord" Frierson – producer & mixing (track 12)
- Anthony "Buckwild" Best – producer & mixing (track 13)
- J. "LA' Smouve" Wilson – producer (track 14)
- Rob "Reef" Tewlow – mixing (track 11), co-executive producer, A&R
- Charles McCrorey – mixing
- Chris Conway – mixing
- Christian "Soundboy" Delatour – mixing
- Christos Tsantilis – mixing
- Doug Wilson – mixing
- Jason Goldstein – mixing
- Ken "Duro" Ifill – mixing
- Mark Mitchell – mixing
- Nikos Teneketzis – engineering
- Eric Smith – engineering assistant
- Shane Stoneback – mixing assistant
- Tim Butler – mixing assistant
- Leon Zervos – mastering
- Gregory J. Angelides – executive producer
- Craig Kallman – executive producer
- Ola Kudu – artwork
- Jonathan Mannion – photography

== Charts ==
Chart (1999)	Peak position
US Billboard 200	22
US Top R&B Albums (Billboard)	4
