= Jealous One's Envy =

Studio album by Fat Joe
- Released: October 24, 1995
- Recorded: November 1994 – August 1995
- Genre: East Coast hip-hop; hardcore hip-hop
- Length: 47:54
- Label: Relativity; Violator
- Producer: Diamond D; DJ Premier; Domingo; Fat Joe; Joe Fatal; L.E.S.

Fat Joe chronology
Represent (1993)	Jealous One's Envy (1995)	Don Cartagena (1998)

Singles from Jealous One's Envy
- 1. "Success" Released: 1995; 2. "Envy" Released: February 13, 1996

Professional ratings
Review scores
Source	Rating
AllMusic	3/5 stars
Muzik	3.5/5 stars
Pitchfork	7.6/10
Rolling Stone	3/5 stars
The New Rolling Stone Album Guide	3/5 stars
The Source	4/5 stars

Jealous One's Envy is the second solo studio album by American rapper Fat Joe, who had previously released his first album under the name Fat Joe da Gangsta. It was released on October 24, 1995, via Relativity Records. Production was handled by Domingo, Diamond D, Joe Fatal, L.E.S., DJ Premier, and Fat Joe himself. It features guest appearances from Armageddon, Doo Wop, Keith Nut, KRS-One, Raekwon, and first ever appearance of fellow New York rapper Big Punisher.

The album debuted at number 71 on the Billboard 200 and number 7 on the Top R&B/Hip-Hop Albums charts in the United States. It was supported with two singles: "Success" and "Envy". The latter made it to number 76 on the Billboard Hot 100 and number 44 on the Hot R&B/Hip-Hop Songs charts.

== Track listing ==
No.	Title	Lyrics	Music	Producer(s)	Length
1.	"Bronx Tales" (featuring KRS-One)	Joseph Cartagena; Lawrence Parker	Joseph Kirkland; Samuel Louis Nistico	Diamond D	3:55
2.	"Success"	Cartagena	Domingo Padilla; Herb Ohta	Domingo	3:50
3.	"Envy"	Cartagena	Leshan Lewis; Marvin Gaye; David Ritz; Odell Brown	L.E.S.	4:11
4.	"Gangbang" (Interlude)				0:54
5.	"Fat Joe's in Town" (featuring Doo Wop)	Cartagena	Lewis; Charles Ray Wiggins; Timothy Christian Riley; Rokusuke Ei; Hachidai Nakamura	L.E.S.	3:42
6.	"Part Deux"	Cartagena	Padilla	Domingo	3:15
7.	"King NY"				1:01
8.	"The Shit Is Real" (DJ Premier Remix)	Cartagena	Chris Martin	DJ Premier	4:36
9.	"Fat Joe's Way"				1:01
10.	"Respect Mine" (featuring Raekwon)	Cartagena	Joe Burgos	Joe Fatal	3:20
11.	"Watch Out" (featuring Armageddon, Big Punisher and Keith Nut)	Cartagena	Kirkland	Diamond D	3:38
12.	"Say Word"	Cartagena	Padilla; William Collins; George Clinton; Garry Shider; Gary Cooper	Domingo	3:29
13.	"Success" (DJ Premier Remix)	Cartagena	Padilla; Ohta	DJ Premier	4:10
14.	"Dedication"	Cartagena	Darryl Ellis; Paul Richmond; Ruben Locke Jr.	Domingo; Fat Joe	3:24
15.	"Bronx Keeps Creating It"	Cartagena	Burgos; David Axelrod	Joe Fatal	3:28
Total length:					47:54

Leftover Tracks

- "Big Apple Gone Rotten" (featuring Armageddon) (produced by Showbiz)
- "Firewater" (featuring Raekwon, Armageddon & Big Punisher) (produced by Showbiz)

Sample credits

- Track 1 contains elements from "Shoreline Drive" performed by Sammy Nestico.
- Tracks 2 and 13 contain elements from "Living in Dreams" performed by Herb Ohta.
- Track 3 contains elements from "Sexual Healing" performed by Marvin Gaye.
- Track 5 contains elements from "Ask of You" performed by Raphael Saadiq.
- Track 6 contains elements from "Love Serenade" performed by Barry White.
- Track 10 contains elements from "Holy Are You" performed by The Electric Prunes.
- Track 12 contains elements from "Munchies for Your Love" performed by Bootsy Collins.
- Track 14 contains elements from "In the Mood" performed by Tyrone Davis.
- Track 15 contains elements from "Holy Thursday" performed by David Axelrod.

== Charts ==
Chart (1995)	Peak position
US Billboard 200	71
US Top R&B Albums (Billboard)	7
