= Capital Punishment (Big Pun album) =

Studio album by Big Pun
- Released: April 28, 1998
- Recorded: 1997–1998
- Genres: Hip-hop; hardcore hip-hop; Latin rap; R&B
- Length: 71:53
- Labels: Terror Squad; Loud
- Producers: Big Pun; Fat Joe; Ju-Ju; Rockwilder; Knobody; Dahoud; Nomad; Mike Zulu; Domingo; Frank Nitty; Younglord; L.E.S.; the Infinite Arkatechz; Minnesota; dead prez; V.I.C.; RZA; Danny O & EQ; Showbiz

Big Pun chronology
| Capital Punishment (1998) | Yeeeah Baby (2000) |

Singles from Capital Punishment
- 1. "I'm Not a Player" Released: August 7, 1997; 2. "Still Not a Player" Released: March 28, 1998; 3. "You Came Up" Released: August 22, 1998

Capital Punishment is the debut album by the American rapper Big Pun, released by Loud Records and by Fat Joe's Terror Squad Productions—their first product. Released on April 28, 1998, it is the only album released during Big Pun's lifetime as he died two months before his second album, Yeeeah Baby.

It is regarded as a hip-hop classic, described by Black Thought of the Roots as "super groundbreaking" upon release. The album peaked at number 5 on the Billboard 200 charts and number 1 on the Top R&B Albums chart for two weeks, eventually becoming the first solo Latin hip-hop record to go Platinum. It was nominated for Best Rap Album at the 1999 Grammy Awards, but lost to Jay-Z's Vol. 2... Hard Knock Life.

== Background ==
In 1995, Big Pun met fellow Puerto Rican and Bronx rapper Fat Joe. He would make his debut on Fat Joe's second album, Jealous One's Envy, on the eleventh track, "Watch Out".

In 1997, Big Pun began recording songs for the album. The album was preceded by two singles: I'm Not a Player, and its remix, Still Not a Player, which would prove to be the commercial breakthrough for both Pun and the songs' producer, Knobody, peaking at No. 57 and 24 on the Billboard Hot 100, respectively.

== Release ==
The album was released on April 28, 1998. It was a commercial success, peaking at No. 5 on the Billboard 200 and topping the R&B/Hip Hop Albums charts. The album would be certified Gold in Canada and Platinum in the United States, becoming the first solo album by a Latin rapper to go Platinum.

=== Clean version ===
A clean version of the album was released. It has 22 tracks, with both skits, "Taster’s Choice" and "Pakinamac Pt. I", removed (due to sexual content and violence), and the skits "Pakinamac Pt. II" and "Uncensored" retitled as "Pakinamac" and "Censored".

== Critical reception ==
Professional ratings
Review scores
| Source | Rating |
|---|---|
| AllMusic | 4/5 stars |
| Christgau's Consumer Guide | (3-star Honorable Mention) |
| Entertainment Weekly | B+ |
| The Indianapolis Star | 3/4 stars |
| Los Angeles Times | 3/4 stars |
| Q | 4/5 stars |
| RapReviews | 9.5/10 |
| Rolling Stone | 4/5 stars |
| The Rolling Stone Album Guide | 3.5/5 stars |
| The Source | 4/5 stars |

The album has received generally positive reviews since its release. The Indianapolis Star said that "as a character, Punisher often falls into routine street posturing but the personality is as solid as big body that accompanies it." Entertainment Weekly stated: "Everything about this Bronx-bred Puerto Rican rapper is generous, his 400-pound girth, his multiple rhyming within each line, and his talent for spewing out verses without stopping for breath." Q wrote: "Displaying huge lyrical prowess and the requisite 'sensitive' side...[the album] established Pun as a serious rival to Biggie Smalls and something of a ladykiller to boot... Outrageously good." The Source determined that "he'll rhyme every possible word in a line because he wants to be twice as nice... Capital Punishment's all about execution." Rap Pages concluded that "Big Pun is at his best with all barrels firing bullets lacing the air like embroidery on grandmama's quilt."

=== Legacy ===
Rolling Stone included Capital Punishment on its list of "The 200 Greatest Hip-Hop Albums of All Time", at number 128.

== Track listing ==
| No. | Title | Writer(s) | Producer(s) | Length |
|---|---|---|---|---|
| 1. | "Intro" | | | 0:33 |
| 2. | "Beware" | Christopher Rios; Jerry Tineo | JuJu | 3:15 |
| 3. | "Super Lyrical" (featuring Black Thought) | Rios; Tariq Trotter | Rockwilder; DJ Iroc (scratches) | 3:28 |
| 4. | "Taster's Choice" (skit, not included on the clean version) | | | 1:20 |
| 5. | "Still Not a Player" (featuring Joe) | Rios; Jerome Foster | Knobody; Dahoud (co.); Nomad (co.) | 3:56 |
| 6. | "Intermission" | | Mike Zulu | 0:21 |
| 7. | "The Dream Shatterer" | Rios | Domingo | 3:33 |
| 8. | "Punish Me" (featuring Miss Jones) | Rios; Frank Pimentel | Frank Nitty | 4:15 |
| 9. | "Pakinamac Pt. I" (skit, not included on the clean version) | | | 1:35 |
| 10. | "You Ain't a Killer" | Rios; Richard Frierson | Young Lord | 4:14 |
| 11. | "Pakinamac Pt. II" (skit) | | | 0:57 |
| 12. | "Caribbean Connection" (featuring Wyclef Jean) | Rios; Frierson; Wyclef Jean | Young Lord | 3:24 |
| 13. | "Glamour Life" (featuring Cuban Link, Triple Seis, Fat Joe and Armageddon) | Rios; Felix Delgado; Sammy Garcia; Joe Cartagena; John Eaddy; Leshan Lewis | L.E.S. | 4:43 |
| 14. | "Capital Punishment" (featuring Prospect) | Rios; Richard Perez; Michael Dewar; Collin Dewar | The Infinite Arkatechz | 4:20 |
| 15. | "Uncensored" (skit) (featuring DJ Funkmaster Flex) | | | 2:12 |
| 16. | "I'm Not a Player" | Rios; Kenny Gamble; Leon Huff | Minnesota | 3:41 |
| 17. | "Twinz (Deep Cover '98)" (featuring Fat Joe) | Rios; Joseph Cartagena | Big Pun & Fat Joe | 3:49 |
| 18. | "The Rain & the Sun" (Interlude) (featuring dead prez) | Rios; Clayton Gavin; Lavonne Alford | dead prez | 1:49 |
| 19. | "Boomerang" | Rios; Cartagena; Vic Padilla | V.I.C. | 3:35 |
| 20. | "You Came Up" (featuring Noreaga) | Rios; Stinson | Rockwilder | 3:54 |
| 21. | "Tres Leches (Triboro Trilogy)" (featuring Prodigy and Inspectah Deck) | Rios; Albert Johnson; Jason Hunter; Robert Diggs; Eric Barrier; William Griffin, Jr. | RZA; DJ Roc Raida (scratches) | 4:19 |
| 22. | "Charlie Rock Shout" (skit) | | | 0:26 |
| 23. | "Fast Money" | Rios | Danny O & EQ | 3:48 |
| 24. | "Parental Discretion" (featuring Busta Rhymes) | Rios; Rodney Lemay | Showbiz | 4:33 |
| Total length: | | | | 1:11:53 |

"Still Not a Player" is edited on all pressings. The original uncensored version can be found on the promo single.

Sample credits

- "Intro" samples a dialogue clip from the 1994 film Fresh.
- "Beware" samples "Theme for the Losers" by Henry Mancini, "Shook Ones Part I" by Mobb Deep, and interpolates "Hot Potato" by Naughty by Nature.
- "Super Lyrical" contains vocal samples from "One More Chance / Stay with Me (Remix)" by The Notorious B.I.G., "It's Logic" by Canibus, and dialogue clips from the 1985 film Rocky IV.
- "Still Not a Player" samples "A Little Bit of Love" by Brenda Russell and interpolates "Brazilian Rhyme (Bejio Interlude)" by Earth, Wind & Fire.
- "The Dream Shatterer" samples "Funk & Wagner" by Don "Sugarcane" Harris.
- "Punish Me" contains a vocal sample from "Not Gonna Be Able to Do It" by Double XX Posse.
- "You Ain't a Killer" samples "With a Child's Heart" by Michael Jackson.
- "Caribbean Connection" samples "Ready or Not" by Johnny Osbourne, "Moshitup" by Just-Ice, and "It's All About the Benjamins" by Puff Daddy.
- "Glamour Life" samples "The World Is a Ghetto" by George Benson.
- "I'm Not a Player" samples "Darlin' Darlin' Baby" by The O'Jays, "Singers" by Eddie Murphy, "Darlin', Darlin', Baby (Sweet, Tender, Love)" by Steve Khan.
- "Boomerang" samples "Le Bracelet" by Alain Goraguer.
- "You Came Up" samples "Don't Ask Me" by Ramon Morris and interpolates "Hail Mary" by 2Pac.
- "Tres Leches (Triboro Trilogy)" samples "Las Vegas Tango" by Gary Burton, "The Start of Your Ending (41st Side)" by Mobb Deep, "Method Man" by Wu-Tang Clan, "I Ain't No Joke" by Eric B. & Rakim, and "Guillotine (Swordz)" by Raekwon.
- "Parental Discretion" samples "Hydra" by Grover Washington, Jr.

== Personnel ==
Credits for Capital Punishment adapted from the album liner notes.

- Armageddon – featured artist
- Denise Barbarita – assistant engineer
- Carlos Bess – mixing
- Big Pun – executive producer, primary artist
- Black Thought – featured artist
- Busta Rhymes – featured artist
- Sean Cane – A&R
- Chris Conway – mixing
- Cuban Link – featured artist
- Dr. Dre – producer
- Dahoud – producer
- Danny O – producer
- dead prez – producer, featured artist
- Domingo – producer
- "E" – mixing
- EQ – producer
- Fat Joe – executive producer, featured artist
- Funkmaster Flex – featured artist
- Paul Gregory – assistant engineer
- Che Harris – A&R coordination
- Daniel "PhotoChop" Hastings
- Troy Hightower – mixing
- Tom Hughes – assistant engineer
- Ken "Duro" Ifil – engineer
- Wyclef Jean – featured artist
- Inspectah Deck – featured artist
- Joe – featured artist
- Ju-Ju – producer
- Jugrnaut – producer
- Knobody – producer
- Ola Kudu – creative direction
- Adam Kudzin – engineer
- L.E.S. – producer
- Matt Life – executive producer
- Laurie Marks – A&R coordination
- Mike D. – A&R
- Minnesota – producer
- Miss Jones – featured artist
- Nastee – engineer
- Frank Nitty – producer
- Nomad – producer
- Prodigy – featured artist
- Prospect – featured artist
- Roc Raida – scratches
- Rockwilder – producer
- RZA – producer
- Schott Free – A&R
- Tony Smalios – engineer, mixing
- Triple Seis – featured artist
- Showbiz – producer
- Soundboy – engineer, mixing
- Kevin Stone – assistant engineer
- Nikos Teneketzis – mixing assistant
- Kieran Walsh – engineer
- Gregory "Gold" Wilson – assistant engineer
- Ted Wohlsen – mixing
- Trauma – producer
- Young Lord – producer
- Leon Zervos – mastering
- Mike Zulu – producer

== Album chart positions ==
| Year | Album | Chart positions | | |
| Year | Album | Billboard 200 | Top R&B/Hip Hop Albums | Top Canadian Albums |
|---|---|---|---|---|
| 1998 | Capital Punishment | 5 | 1 | 11 |

=== Singles ===
| Year | Song | Hot 100 | Hot R&B/Hip-Hop Singles & Tracks | Hot Rap Singles | Rhythmic Top 40 | Hot Dance Music/Maxi-Singles Sales |
|---|---|---|---|---|---|---|
| 1997 | "I'm Not a Player" | 57 | 19 | 3 | - | 7 |
| 1998 | "Still Not a Player" | 24 | 6 | 13 | 5 | 1 |
| 1998 | "You Came Up" | - | 49 | 43 | - | - |

== Certifications ==
| Region | Certification | Certified units/sales |
|---|---|---|
| Canada (Music Canada) | Gold | 50,000^{^} |
| United States (RIAA) | Platinum | 1,000,000^{^} |
^{^} Shipments figures based on certification alone.

== See also ==
- List of number-one R&B albums of 1998 (U.S.)
