= Terror Squad Entertainment =

American hip hop record label

- Parent company: The Warner Music Group (1997—2006); Sony Music Entertainment (Big Pun); EMI
- Founded: 1997; 29 years ago
- Founder: Fat Joe
- Status: Active
- Distributors: RED (Capital Punishment); Columbia Records (Yeeeah Baby); Atlantic Records (1997—2006); Virgin Records
- Genre: Hip Hop
- Country of origin: United States

Terror Squad Productions (later Terror Squad Entertainment) is an American hip hop and rap record company founded by Fat Joe on April 2, 1996. The label has been distributed by Atlantic, Virgin Records, and Columbia Records. The label's flagship artist was Big Pun.

== History ==
=== 1997—1999: Early years, Big Pun, Terror Squad ===
Dissatisfied with the commercial performance of his previous albums under Relativity Records, Fat Joe departed the label and signed with Atlantic Records under the leadership of Craig Kallman. Following his move, he established his own imprint, Terror Squad Productions, with Atlantic providing the financial backing, promotion, and distribution for its releases. Under the arrangement, Fat Joe was responsible for developing the label's artists and overseeing the production of their albums. Serving as the label's A&R representative and director was Felix "Full Flex" Cabrera, a longtime friend of Fat Joe who died in 2015.

In addition to himself, Fat Joe signed his hip-hop collective, Terror Squad, along with its members Armageddon, Prospect, Triple Seis, Cuban Link, and Big Pun. The label's first release was Big Pun's debut studio album, Capital Punishment, released on April 28, 1998. Executive produced by Fat Joe and Big Pun, the album featured guest appearances from Fat Joe and Terror Squad. It peaked at number 5 on the Billboard 200 and was subsequently certified platinum by the RIAA. The label's second release was Fat Joe's third studio album, Don Cartagena, released in September 1998. Executive produced by Fat Joe, the album featured guest appearances from Big Pun and Terror Squad. It peaked at number 7 on the Billboard 200 and was certified gold by the RIAA.

Terror Squad released its self-titled debut album, The Album, on September 21, 1999. The project featured production contributions from group member Armageddon. Although it failed to achieve the same commercial success as the group's earlier label releases, the album received generally favorable reviews from music critics and was meant to be the foundation for other members to release their solo albums.

On February 7, 2000, Big Pun died of heart failure at the age of 28, just two months before the scheduled release of his second studio album, Yeeeah Baby. The album was released as planned posthumously on April 4, 2000, through Loud Records, Columbia Records, and Terror Squad Productions. Executive produced by Fat Joe, it featured guest appearances from Prospect, Cuban Link, and Fat Joe. It also marked the recording debut of Remy Ma, then known as Remy Martin, who was a protégé of Big Pun and appeared on the track "Ms. Martin." Yeeeah Baby debuted and peaked at number 3 on the Billboard 200, selling approximately 179,000 copies in its first week. It also reached number one on the Top R&B/Hip-Hop Albums chart. Although initially certified gold in July 2000, it was eventually certified platinum by the Recording Industry Association of America (RIAA) on October 31, 2017.

=== 2000—2005: Life after Big Pun and Terror Squad reformation ===
Shortly after Big Pun's death, Triple Seis left Terror Squad Productions and parted ways with the Terror Squad group. Cuban Link would follow suit shortly thereafter after his long-awaited debut studio album that was scheduled for a summer 2000 release, 24K, was shelved due to bootlegging, problems with Atlantic Records, and issues with Fat Joe.

On December 4, 2001, Fat Joe released his fourth studio album Jealous Ones Still Envy (J.O.S.E.) through Terror Squad Productions. It featured the hit singles "We Thuggin'" and "What's Luv", and featured guest appearances from Armageddon (who co-executive produced the album along with Fat Joe), Prospect, and Remy Ma. The following year in 2002, Fat Joe released Loyalty. The album was a commercial disappointment, only peaking at number 31 on the Billboard 200 and failing to achieve a RIAA certification. In 2004, Terror Squad released its second and final studio album True Story through Steve Rifkind's SRC Records, Universal Records and Terror Squad Entertainment. The album peaked at number 7 on the Billboard 200. Though Prospect, Tony Sunshine, and Armageddon had made guest appearances on Fat Joe's albums and Terror Squad albums, they never released solo debut studio albums, and they all left by 2006.

In 2005, Fat Joe released All or Nothing. The album did better than his previous album but was still a commercial failure, and it was Fat Joe's final album on Atlantic Records.

=== Later years & Signing of DJ Khaled (2005-present) ===
In August 2006, Fat Joe announced and confirmed that he signed a distribution deal with Virgin Records America and Imperial Records. In 2006, Fat Joe released Make It Rain. A top 15 single on the Billboard Hot 100, Make It Rain was certified Platinum by the RIAA. The label also released the debut album from DJ Khaled & PRO's Super Produced Listennn... the Album that year on Koch. The label followed the success of these two albums into 2007, which led to the 2nd album from DJ Khaled We The Best which featured the hit single "We Takin' Over", which had guest appearances from Akon, T.I., Rick Ross, Fat Joe, Baby, and Lil Wayne.

== Discography ==
- 1998: Big Pun - Capital Punishment
- 1998: Fat Joe - Don Cartagena
- 1999: Terror Squad - The Album
- 2000: Big Pun - Yeeeah Baby
- 2001: Fat Joe - Jealous Ones Still Envy
- 2002: Fat Joe - Loyalty
- 2004: Terror Squad - True Story
- 2005: Fat Joe - All or Nothing
- 2006: Remy Ma - There's Something About Remy: Based on a True Story
- 2006: DJ Khaled - Listennn... the Album
- 2006: Fat Joe - Me, Myself & I
- 2007: DJ Khaled - We the Best
- 2008: Fat Joe - The Elephant in the Room
- 2008: DJ Khaled - We Global
- 2009: Fat Joe - Jealous Ones Still Envy 2
- 2010: Fat Joe - The Darkside Vol. 1
- 2011: Fat Joe - The Darkside Vol. 2
- 2013: Fat Joe - The Darkside III

== Roster ==
Artists

- Fat Joe
- Big Pun (deceased)
- Cuban Link
- Prospect
- Armageddon
- Triple Seis
- Remy Ma

Executives

- Fat Joe (Founder, CEO)
- Felix Cabrera (A&R, director)
