= Cuban Link =

Cuban American rapper

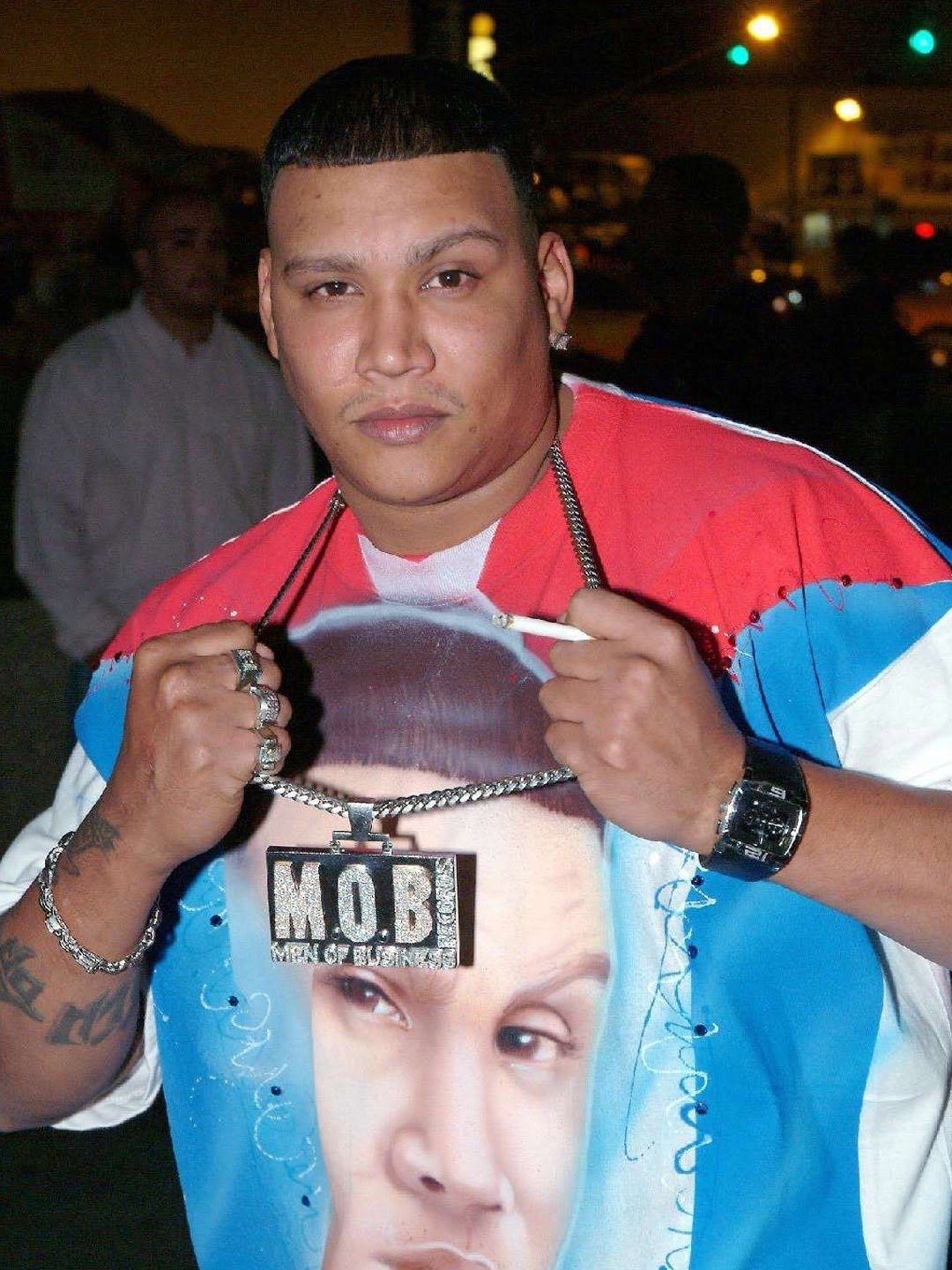
- Cuban Link in 2005

Background information
- Also known as: CLK; Lyrical Assassin
- Born: Felix Delgado; December 18, 1974 (age 51); Havana, Cuba
- Origin: The Bronx, New York City, U.S.
- Genres: East Coast hip-hop; Latin hip-hop; Mafioso rap; hardcore hip-hop; reggaeton
- Occupations: Rapper; songwriter; actor; record producer
- Years active: 1994–present
- Labels: Atlantic; Terror Squad; M.O.B.; CLK
- Formerly of: Terror Squad; Bang Bang Boogie

Felix Delgado (born December 18, 1974), better known by his stage name Cuban Link, is a Cuban-American rapper. Emerging from the underground hip-hop scene in the Bronx, Cuban Link made his first on-record performance on the Beatnuts' 1997 single "Off the Books". Link was then discovered and mentored by fellow Bronx rappers Fat Joe and Big Pun, guest appearing on the latter's album Capital Punishment (1998). He is also a member of Joe's hip-hop group Terror Squad.

== Early life ==
Delgado was born in Havana, Cuba, on December 18, 1974. He and his family emigrated to the United States in 1980 during the Mariel boatlift, settling in the South Bronx in New York City in 1984 when he was nine years old. At the end of the Boatlift, he originally arrived in Miami, Florida and also settled in Puerto Rico for a unspecified amount of time, until he permanently settled in The Bronx.

While on the Mariel Boatlift, Cuban and his family sailed from Cuba to Miami, Florida for six months from April 15 to October 31, 1980. When Cuban arrived, he was in a concentration camp on 95 North where they had all the other Cubans. Cuban lived in Miami for six months before settling in Puerto Rico for three years and then moving to the South Bronx, settling in the Morrisania neighborhood.

== Career ==
When Delgado was growing up, he primarily lived around Puerto Ricans, Dominicans, and African Americans. At the same time, hip hop music was rising in popularity in his neighborhood.

In 1986, at age 12, Cuban started writing rhymes after being drawn into hip-hop culture and has named his influences as Juice Crew, Big Daddy Kane, Kool G Rap, KRS-One, Nas, and later on in life, Big Pun.

At age 15, in 1989, Delgado started rapping under the moniker Lyrical Assassin, which led him to meet his future partners-in-rhyme Christopher Rios and Samuel Garcia, who at the time were known as Big Moon Dawg and Joker Jamz. This led them to form the underground rap group Full-A-Clips. Throughout the early 90s, Full-A-Clips became a well-known group throughout the Bronx, earning them radio freestyles and live performances. Their fourth member, Toom, joined the group in 1994.

In 1995, Delgado and his partners Rios and Garcia were freestyling at a bodega in The Bronx, when Fat Joe stops by the bodega to buy some groceries. Pun spots Joe and recognizes him and goes up to him to spit a verse for him. When Pun spit his verse, he left Joe so impressed that he offered Pun a ride in his limousine. After hearing Pun, he recruited Delgado and Garcia as well.

=== The Terror Squad formation ===
After Fat Joe discovered Full-A-Clips, signed to Atlantic Records and launched Terror Squad Productions in 1997, he signed Big Pun, which led to the formation of the Bronx-based rap group Terror Squad, which consisted of Fat Joe, Big Pun, Cuban Link, Triple Seis, Prospect and Armageddon. Following this, Cuban Link was signed to Atlantic and Terror Squad and contributed guest appearance vocals to Fat Joe's September 1998 album Don Cartagena on the songs "Bet Ya Man Can't (Triz)", "The Hidden Hand", and "Terror Squadians".

=== The Terror Squad collaboration album ===
On September 21, 1999, Link and the Terror Squad released their self-titled debut album which reached number 20 on the Billboard 200. Cuban contributed vocals on seven tracks, some of them being "In For Life", "Pass the Glock", "As the World Turns", and "Tell Me What U Want". After signing to Atlantic and Terror Squad, Cuban Link continued recording for his debut LP 24K which he originally started working on in 1997.

=== 1997–2001: Signing with Atlantic, 24K album, feud with Fat Joe, cancelled Scarface sequel ===
In 1997, Cuban began recording songs for his debut album 24K. One of the first songs he recorded was "Toe to Toe" with Big Pun. He recorded songs with Pun, Angie Martinez, SunKiss, Ja Rule, Triple Seis, Kool G Rap, and many other artists. During the process, Big Pun died on February 7, 2000, due to a heart attack caused by weight issues. This led to Cuban writing and releasing "Flowers For The Dead" in Pun's honor. Three singles were released from the album: "Flowers For The Dead", "Still Telling Lies", and "Why Me?". The songs "Play How You Want" and "Toe to Toe" were released as promotional singles by Atlantic Records. In addition, "Why Me?" was featured in the 2000 action-comedy film Bait and another song from the album, "Project Party" was featured in the 2000 sports drama film Girlfight. The album was scheduled to be released in the summer of 2000 but changed to January 2001. However, without Pun's mediation, personal tension between Fat Joe and Cuban Link, problems with Atlantic and bootlegging prevented the release of 24K. 24K is now available for digital download on Amazon Music, but has not been released physically. Cuban Link's feud with Fat Joe led to him being blacklisted from the music industry and forced to go underground.

In 2001, plans were made for Cuban Link to star in the sequel to the legendary crime film Scarface, titled Scarface 2: Son of Tony. The plan drew both praise and criticism. The sequel was ultimately cancelled due to film rights issues and creative control.

=== 2001–2004: Released Broken Chains series with his DJ Dren Starr & Roy P. Perez ===
After being sliced in the face three times at an Angie Martinez release party and performance for a song called: "Live At Jimmy's" featuring Cuban Link on Angie Martinez's album, Cuban alongside his DJ Dren Starr and executive Roy P. Perez this led Cuban Link to sign with Universal/MOB for $2 Million for one album making it the largest independent deal at the time.

=== 2004–2005: Signing with M.O.B. Records, Chain Reaction ===
After his career derailed, Link was still recording music despite the 24K album being shelved by Joe and Atlantic Records. In addition, Cuban guest appeared on Triple Seis' debut studio album Only Time'll Tell, which was released on July 20, 2004 through Madd Records. Cuban featured on the tracks "Drinks Up", "Hustler" and "Be About It".

In 2004, a few years after leaving Terror Squad, Cuban joined independent label Men of Business and released Chain Reaction on August 16, 2005. It included singles "Sugar Daddy" (featuring Mýa) and "Scandalous" (featuring Don Omar) with influence from reggaeton. It was the largest independent deal ($2MM) for a single album and an unsigned act at the time and a joint venture with Universal. Cuban linked up with several producers and artists such as Eliel, Swizz Beatz, Mr. Porter and Syleena Johnson. In addition, Cuban released two promotional singles: "Shakedown" and "Talk About It" featuring Jadakiss.

=== 2007-2011: Spanish album, Bang Bang Boogie formation ===
In 2007, Cuban started working on his first spanish album, Hijo De La Calle, starting off by releasing the song "Nos Tienen Miedo" which is a diss song towards rapper Pitbull and Cuban's former protege Don Dinero. The song featured several other rappers of Latin descent. During the process, Cuban recorded songs with Poe Rilla, Zaturno, Melymel, Temperamento, MC Ceja and many other artists. He released various Spanish singles such as "Nos Tienen Miedo", "Nos Tienen Miedo 2", "Libertad" and "Loco Callejero".

In late 2007 or early '08, Cuban joined the underground hip hop group Bang Bang Boogie, which consisted of him, Mysonne, Lord Tariq, Hocus 45th and S-One. The group was created mainly to bring The Bronx back to the forefront, bringing awareness to the Bronx neighborhoods. The group released two mixtapes in 2008 but disbanded in 2010 due to Hocus and S-One being falsely incarcerated and also due to the group and a lack of mainstream support without major label backing, which made it hard to gain national recognition. The remaining members went on to focus on their solo careers. Cuban eventually released his mixtape Chain Gang Bully in 2011 and a follow-up Chain Gang Bully 2 in 2012 but never released his Spanish LP.

== Discography ==
Studio albums

- 24K (2000) (unreleased)
- Chain Reaction (2005)
- Hijo De La Calle (2026)

Collaboration albums

- Terror Squad: The Album with Terror Squad (1999)

== Filmography ==
Year	Title	Role	Notes
2000	106 & Park	Himself	Episode 52
2001	Blazin'	Pete	
2002	Big Pun: Still Not a Player	Himself	
2004	106 & Park	Himself	
2004	The Drop	Himself	3 episodes
2005	Showtime at the Apollo	Himself	Episode: "Cuban Link with Mya/Lady Saw"
2005	Soul Train	Himself	Episode: "Vivian Green/Cuban Link Featuring Mya/Pretty Ricky"
2005	Law and Order: Criminal Intent	Enrique	Episode: "Acts of Contrition"
2008	Big Pun: The Legacy	Himself	Video
