= Big Pun =

American rapper (1971–2000)

- Big Pun in 1999

Background information
- Also known as: Big Punisher; Big Dog The Punisher; Big Moon Dawg
- Born: Christopher Lee Rios; November 10, 1971; New York City, New York, U.S.
- Died: February 7, 2000 (aged 28) White Plains, New York, U.S.
- Genres: East Coast hip-hop; Latin hip-hop; gangsta rap; hardcore hip-hop
- Occupations: Rapper; songwriter; actor
- Years active: 1992–2000
- Labels: RED; Columbia; SRC; Loud; Terror Squad
- Formerly of: Terror Squad
- Children: 3, including Christopher Jr.
- Website: officialbigpun.com

Christopher Lee Rios (November 10, 1971 – February 7, 2000), better known by his stage name Big Pun (short for Big Punisher), was an American rapper. Emerging from the underground hip-hop scene in the Bronx, he came to prominence upon discovery by fellow Bronx rapper Fat Joe, alongside Cuban Link and Triple Seis, and thereafter guest appeared on his 1995 album Jealous One's Envy.

Big Pun signed with Fat Joe's label, Terror Squad Productions and Loud Records in 1997 to release his debut studio album, Capital Punishment (1998) the following year. Met with critical acclaim and commercial success, the album earned a nomination for Best Rap Album at the 41st Annual Grammy Awards, peaked at number five on the Billboard 200, and became the first hip hop recording by a Latino solo act to receive platinum certification by the Recording Industry Association of America (RIAA). His second album, Yeeeah Baby (2000) peaked at number three on the Billboard 200, although Pun died two months before its release.

== Early life ==
Rios was born in the South Bronx in New York City to parents of Puerto Rican descent. He grew up in the Soundview neighborhood and had at least two sisters and one brother. He regularly played basketball and trained in boxing.

He moved out of his mother's house at age 15 and was homeless for a period of time in the late 1980s. Later, he received a large personal injury settlement from the city stemming from an incident in 1976, where Rios broke his leg while playing in a park. After receiving the settlement money, Rios married his high school sweetheart, Liza, in 1990 and the two moved into a house together.

Rios struggled with depression stemming from his turbulent childhood, and he coped with it by overeating. Between the ages of 18 and 21, Rios's weight rocketed from 180 lb (82 kg) to 300 lb (140 kg).

== Career ==
During the late 1980s, he began writing rap lyrics. He later formed the underground group Full-A-Clips with Lyrical Assassin, Joker Jamz, and Toom. Rios made a number of recordings with the group in the 1990s, which have not been released. At this point, Rios was operating under the alias Big Moon Dawg. After changing his stage name to Big Punisher, Rios met fellow Puerto Rican and Bronx rapper Fat Joe in 1995 and made his commercial debut on Fat Joe's second album, Jealous One's Envy, in addition to appearing on the song, "Watch Out". He also appeared in The Beatnuts' song "Off the Books".

=== Capital Punishment (1997–1998) ===
In 1997, Big Pun began recording songs for his debut album Capital Punishment. In 1997, producer Knobody's production partner Sean C took advantage of his new role as A&R at Loud Records to play Knobody's tracks to Big Pun. Suitably impressed, the rapper hired Knobody to remix "I'm Not a Player". The remixed song, featuring Joe and titled "Still Not a Player", became Big Pun's first major mainstream hit and major breakthrough for Knobody. The full-length debut Capital Punishment followed in 1998, and became the first album by a solo Hispanic rapper to go platinum, peaking at No. 5 on the Billboard 200. Capital Punishment was also nominated for the Grammy Award for Best Rap Album.

=== The Terror Squad collaboration album and other collaborations (1999–2000) ===
Big Pun became a member of Terror Squad, a New York–based group of rappers founded by Fat Joe, with most of the roster supplied by the now-defunct Full-A-Clips who released their debut album The Album in 1999. The album did not fare well commercially but it was well received critically and the album was meant to start the foundation for all other Terror Squad members to release their solo projects.

Big Pun also contributed vocals to the song "Piña Colada" with rapper Sheek Louch from the compilation album Ryde or Die Vol. 1, and appeared as a featured artist on Jennifer Lopez’s 1999 debut single "Feelin’ So Good", alongside Fat Joe.

== Health problems and death ==
Rios struggled with weight issues his entire adult life. He weighed 180 pounds (82 kg) at age 18, which increased to 300 pounds (140 kg) at 21. His weight fluctuated in the early 1990s between obese and morbidly obese. Shortly after the release of Capital Punishment in April 1998, Rios was ordered by a doctor to rest for two weeks, after he showed signs of exhaustion while doing promotional work. Rios enrolled in a weight-loss program at Duke University in the summer of 1999 at 600 pounds (272 kg), and shed 100 pounds (45 kg), but he prematurely quit the program and within four months regained the weight. His weight was a constant topic of argument among him and his friends, to the point that Rios did not like to eat around them. Around two weeks before his death, Liza noticed that his body began to deteriorate from the obesity, and that when he ate, he frequently vomited, and his skin appeared unhealthy.

On February 5, 2000, Rios withdrew from a planned Saturday Night Live performance with Fat Joe and Jennifer Lopez due to illness. Two days later while staying at the Crowne Plaza Hotel with his family in White Plains, New York, he suffered a heart attack and respiratory failure and was rushed to White Plains Hospital, where he died at the age of 28 after paramedics were unable to revive him. His weight had reached a peak of 698 pounds (317 kg) at the time of his death. Rios was survived by his wife, Liza, and their three children, Star, Vanessa, and Christopher Jr.

Thousands of fans showed up in what amounted to a block party outside of Ortiz Funeral Home, and a funeral procession was held for him. Rios was cremated and buried at Woodlawn Cemetery near Woodlawn Heights, Bronx.

== Posthumous works and legacy ==
Big Pun's second album, Yeeeah Baby, completed after his death, was released in April 2000. It peaked at No. 3 on the Billboard charts and earned gold record status within three months of its release. A posthumous compilation album, Endangered Species, was released in April 2001. Endangered Species collected some of Pun's greatest hits, previously unreleased material, numerous guest appearances, and remixed "greatest verses." As with his other albums, it also peaked in the top ten of the Billboard 200, reaching No. 7, but didn't sell as much as the previous Big Pun albums had. He collaborated with Fat Joe on Duets: The Final Chapter, an album of tracks featuring The Notorious B.I.G., also deceased. The track "Get Your Grind On" begins with a Big Pun radio interview in which he said he would perform a duet with Biggie at the gates of heaven. Pun was also featured on a track from the revived Terror Squad's second album, True Story, on the track "Bring 'Em Back" with Big L, another deceased rapper.

In addition, Big Pun featured on the tracks "Toe to Toe" and "Cheat On Her" from Cuban Link's debut studio album 24K.

On June 6, 2000, Cuban Link released "Flowers for the Dead", a tribute song to Pun, which was released as the lead single to Cuban's album 24K. The official music video was directed by Chris Robinson and was filmed in The Bronx, NY and debuted on Rap City.

On May 2, 2001, the New York City Council stalled plans to rename a small portion of Rogers Place as a tribute, due to distaste over Big Pun's lyrics that "include[d] profanity and references to violence and drug dealing".

In 2002, a documentary about Big Pun, entitled Big Pun: Still Not a Player was released, which revealed that he was homeless as an adolescent and abused as a child. The film includes footage of him pistol-whipping Liza Rios.

In 2004, Triple Seis released the track "Harsh Reality", which samples Big Pun's "You Ain't a Killer" and credits Pun as a featured artist. In 2005, Cuban Link released "Letter to Pun" which was Cuban's second tribute song to Pun, the previous being "Flowers for the Dead" from Cuban's 24K album. A video was made for the song and was included in Cuban's Chain Reaction CD packaging. Seis has a cameo in the video.

A second posthumous album was planned for release by Sony Music Entertainment in 2006 but was shelved due to a dispute with producer John "Jellybean" Benitez, who owned the publishing rights to many of the intended album's tracks. In June 2005, Liza Rios put her husband's $100,000 custom Terror Squad medallion up for auction on eBay, citing financial hardship due to receiving no royalties from Pun's album sales.

On March 22, 2021, the intersection of East Fordham Rd and Grand Concourse in his native Bronx was named "Big Pun Plaza" in Pun's honor. A ceremony including family, friends, and local politicians preceded the street naming.

In 2022, Cuban Link released "Letter to Pun, Pt. 2 (3 Sides to a Story)", the long-awaited sequel to "Letter to Pun". The single was eventually followed by an official video in 2025.

== Discography ==
Studio albums

- Capital Punishment (1998)
- Yeeeah Baby (2000)

Collaboration album

- Terror Squad: The Album with Terror Squad (1999)

Posthumous compilation album

- Endangered Species (2001)

== Filmography ==
Year	Title	Role	Notes
1998	Moesha	Himself	Credited as Big Punisher
1999	Thicker than Water	Punny	
1999	Urban Menace	Crow	
1999	Whiteboyz	Don Flip Crew	Uncredited
2000	Boricua's Bond	Himself	Credited as Big Punisher; Posthumous release
2002	Big Pun: Still Not a Player	Himself	Archival footage Posthumous release
2002	Big Pun Live	Himself	Archival footage Posthumous release
2007	Rap Sheet: Hip-Hop and the Cops	Himself	Archival footage Posthumous release
2008	Big Pun: The Legacy	Himself	Archival footage Posthumous release
2010	Big Pun's Legacy: The Lost Files	Himself	Archival footage Posthumous release

== Awards and nominations ==
=== Grammy Awards ===
Year	Nominated work	Award	Result
1999	Capital Punishment	Grammy Award for Best Rap Album	Nominated
