= Fat Joe discography =

Hip hop recording artist discography

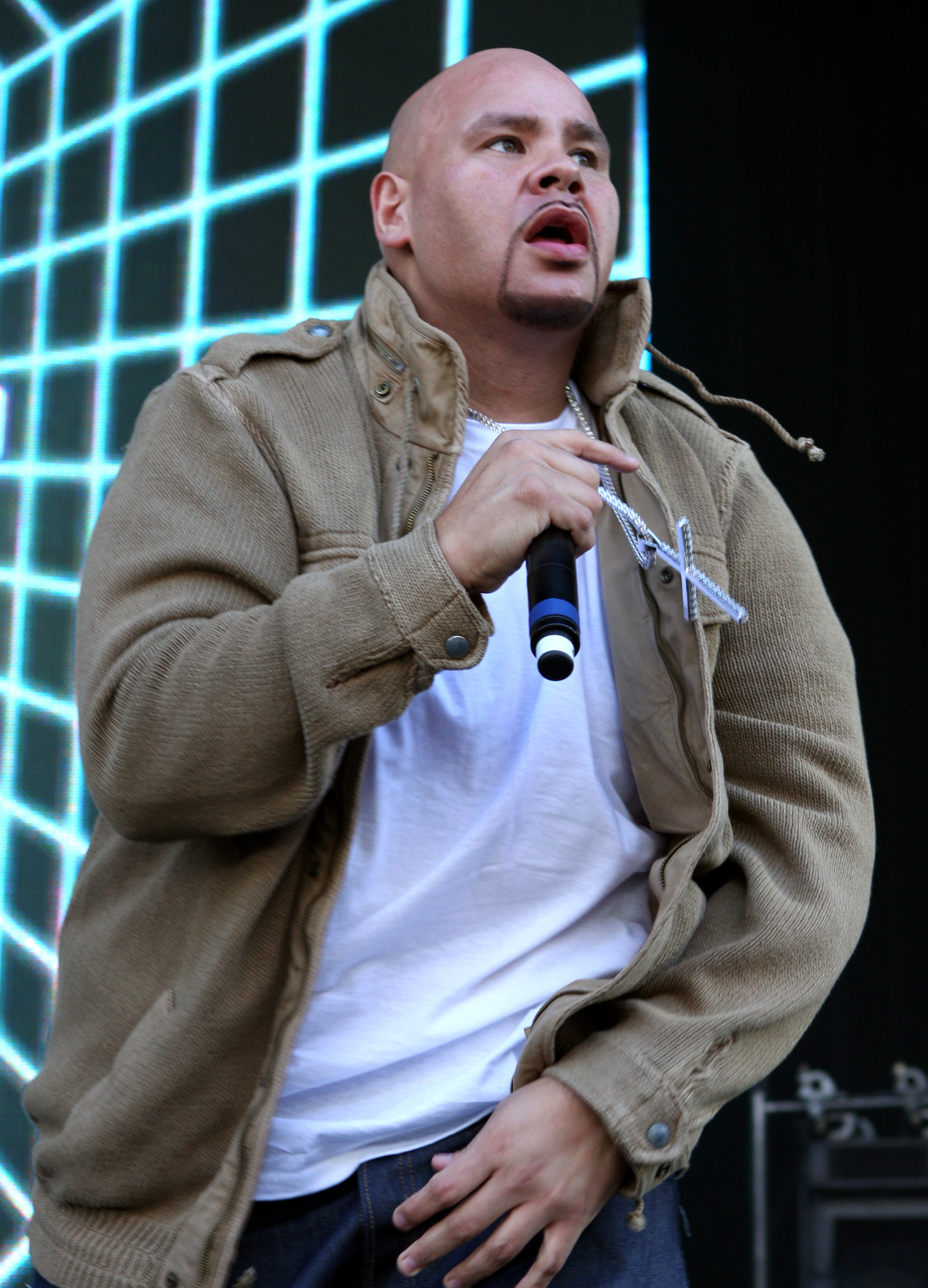
- Fat Joe performing in April 2011
- Studio albums: 12
- Singles: 22
- Collaborative albums: 2
- Mixtapes: 3

The discography of American rapper Fat Joe consists of twelve studio albums, two collaborative albums, three mixtapes and twenty-two singles, as well as other artists' singles in which Fat Joe did a guest performance. Fat Joe is an American rapper known for his solo work and membership in the rap groups D.I.T.C. (Diggin' in the Crates) and Terror Squad. His first solo album was Represent, released in 1993, followed by Jealous One's Envy in 1995. From 1998 to 2006, he was signed to Atlantic Records, releasing four albums under the label, Don Cartagena in 1998, Jealous Ones Still Envy (J.O.S.E.) in 2001, Loyalty in 2002, and All or Nothing in 2005. Starting in 2006, when his album Me, Myself, & I was released, Fat Joe was signed to Imperial Records, which distributes through Terror Squad Entertainment. His follow-up album was The Elephant in the Room, which was released in 2008; Jealous Ones Still Envy 2 (J.O.S.E. 2), the sequel to his successful album Jealous Ones Still Envy (J.O.S.E.), was released in 2009.

On July 27, 2010, Fat Joe released his tenth album titled The Darkside Vol. 1.

The debut album of D.I.T.C. was released in 2000. Fat Joe participated in both Terror Squad albums: Terror Squad (1999) and True Story (2004). Terror Squad had a number-one hit, "Lean Back", in 2004. He has an album with Dre called Family Ties which was released on December 6, 2019.

== Albums ==
=== Studio albums ===
List of studio albums, with selected chart positions and certifications
Title	Album details	Peak chart positions									Certifications
Title	Album details	US	US R&B	US Rap	FRA	GER	NL	NZ	SWI	UK	Certifications
Represent (as Fat Joe da Gangsta)	Released: July 27, 1993; Label: Relativity, Violator; Format: CD, LP, cassette, digital download, streaming	—	46	—	—	—	—	—	—	—	
Jealous One's Envy	Released: October 24, 1995; Label: Relativity, Violator; Format: CD, LP, cassette, digital download, streaming	71	7	—	—	—	—	—	—	—	
Don Cartagena	Released: September 1, 1998; Label: Terror Squad, Mystic, Big Beat, Atlantic; Format: CD, LP, cassette, digital download, streaming	7	2	—	—	—	—	—	—	179	RIAA: Gold
Jealous Ones Still Envy (J.O.S.E.)	Released: December 4, 2001; Label: Terror Squad, Atlantic; Format: CD, LP, cassette, digital download, streaming	21	6	—	79	27	87	32	43	19	RIAA: Platinum; BPI: Silver
Loyalty	Released: November 12, 2002; Label: Terror Squad, Atlantic; Format: CD, LP, cassette, digital download, streaming	31	11	—	—	—	—	—	—	—	
All or Nothing	Released: June 14, 2005; Label: Terror Squad, Atlantic; Format: CD, LP, digital download, streaming	6	2	1	127	—	—	—	59	172	
Me, Myself & I	Released: November 14, 2006; Label: Terror Squad, Virgin, Imperial; Format: CD, LP, digital download, streaming	14	3	2	—	—	—	—	—	—	
The Elephant in the Room	Released: March 11, 2008; Label: Terror Squad, Virgin, Imperial; Format: CD, LP, digital download, streaming	6	3	3	—	—	—	—	—	—	
Jealous Ones Still Envy 2 (J.O.S.E. 2)	Released: October 6, 2009; Label: Terror Squad, Virgin, Imperial; Format: CD, digital download, streaming	73	9	4	—	—	—	—	—	—	
The Darkside Vol. 1	Released: July 27, 2010; Label: Terror Squad, E1 Music; Format: CD, digital download, streaming	27	9	7	—	—	—	—	—	—	
The World Changed On Me	Released: December 13, 2024; Label: RNG, Empire; Format: Digital download, streaming	—	—	—	—	—	—	—	—	—	
Organized Rhyme	Released: August 28, 2026; Label: RNG, Empire; Format: Digital download, streaming	—	—	—	—	—	—	—	—	—	
"—" denotes a recording that did not chart or was not released in that territory.

=== Collaborative albums ===
List of collaborative albums, with selected chart positions
Title	Album details	Peak chart positions		
Title	Album details	US	US R&B	US Rap
Plata O Plomo (with Remy Ma)	Released: February 17, 2017; Label: RNG, Empire; Format: CD, digital download, streaming	44	19	12
Family Ties (with Dre)	Released: December 6, 2019; Label: RNG, Empire; Format: CD, digital download, streaming	81	39	—
What Would Big Do 2021 (with DJ Drama)	Released: August 13, 2021; Label: Self-released; Format: CD, digital download, streaming	—	—	—

== Mixtapes ==
Title	Mixtape details
The Crack Era	Released: January 21, 2008; Label: Bulldog Kid; Format: CD, digital download
The Darkside Vol. 2	Released: October 31, 2011; Label: Terror Squad; Format: CD, digital download
The Darkside III	Released: August 26, 2013; Label: Terror Squad; Format: CD, digital download

== Singles ==
=== As lead artist ===
List of singles as lead artist, with selected chart positions and certifications, showing year released and album name
Title	Year	Peak chart positions										Certifications	Album
Title	Year	US	US R&B/HH	US Rap	AUS	FRA	GER	NL	NZ	SWI	UK	Certifications	Album
"Flow Joe" (as Fat Joe da Gangsta)	1993	89	62	1	—	—	—	—	—	—	—		Represent
"Watch the Sound" (as Fat Joe da Gangsta) [featuring Grand Puba and Diamond D]	1993	—	108	—	—	—	—	—	—	—	—		Represent
"The Shit Is Real" (as Fat Joe da Gangsta)	1994	—	102	38	—	—	—	—	—	—	—		Represent
"Success"	1995	—	125	—	—	—	—	—	—	—	—		Jealous One's Envy
"Envy"	1996	76	44	8	—	—	—	—	—	—	—		Jealous One's Envy
"Don Cartagena" (featuring Puff Daddy)	1998	— (Note: "Don Cartagena" did not enter the Billboard Hot 100, but peaked at number two on the Bubbling Under Hot 100 Singles chart.)	40	21	—	—	—	—	—	—	—		Don Cartagena
"Bet Ya Man Can't Triz" (featuring Big Pun, Triple Seis and Cuban Link)	1998	—	54	37	—	—	—	—	—	—	97		Don Cartagena
"Why Me?" (with Cuban Link)	2000	—	—	—	—	—	—	—	—	—	—		Bait/ 24K
"We Thuggin'" (featuring R. Kelly)	2001	15	5	7	37	—	70	—	—	—	48		Jealous Ones Still Envy (J.O.S.E.)
"Opposites Attract (What They Like)" (featuring Remy Ma)	2001	—	59	—	—	—	—	—	—	—	—		Jealous Ones Still Envy (J.O.S.E.)
"What's Luv?" (featuring Ja Rule and Ashanti)	2002	2	3	1	4	27	10	7	5	2	4	ARIA: Gold; BPI: Platinum; RMNZ: 3× Platinum	Jealous Ones Still Envy (J.O.S.E.)
"Crush Tonight" (featuring Ginuwine)	2002	77	29	17	—	—	92	—	—	—	42		Loyalty
"All I Need" (featuring Armageddon and Tony Sunshine)	2003	56	35	21	—	—	—	—	—	—	—		Loyalty
"So Much More"	2005	81	34	18	—	—	—	—	—	—	—		All or Nothing
"Get It Poppin'" (featuring Nelly)	2005	9	17	6	30	—	48	—	24	28	34	RIAA: Gold	All or Nothing
"Make It Rain" (featuring Lil Wayne)	2006	13	6	2	—	—	—	—	14	—	—	RIAA: Platinum; MC: Platinum	Me, Myself & I
"I Won't Tell" (featuring J. Holiday)	2007	37	12	3	—	—	—	—	—	—	—		The Elephant in the Room
"Ain't Sayin' Nothin'" (featuring Plies and Dre)	2008	—	93	—	—	—	—	—	—	—	—		The Elephant in the Room
"One" (featuring Akon)	2009	—	74	—	—	—	—	—	—	—	—		Jealous Ones Still Envy 2 (J.O.S.E. 2)
"Aloha" (featuring Pleasure P and Rico Love)	2009	—	86	—	—	—	—	—	—	—	—		Jealous Ones Still Envy 2 (J.O.S.E. 2)
"(Ha Ha) Slow Down" (featuring Young Jeezy)	2010	—	54	23	—	—	—	—	—	—	—		The Darkside Vol. 1
"If It Ain't About Money" (featuring Trey Songz)	2010	—	57	25	—	—	—	—	—	—	—		The Darkside Vol. 1
"Another Round" (featuring Chris Brown)	2011	80	5	6	—	—	—	—	—	—	—	RIAA: Gold	Non-album singles
"Pride N Joy" (featuring Kanye West, Miguel, Jadakiss, Mos Def, DJ Khaled, Roscoe Dash and Busta Rhymes)	2012	—	81	—	—	—	—	—	—	—	—		Non-album singles
"Instagram That Hoe" (featuring Juicy J and Rick Ross)	2012	—	—	—	—	—	—	—	—	—	—		Non-album singles
"Yellow Tape" (featuring Lil Wayne, ASAP Rocky and French Montana)	2012	—	57	—	—	—	—	—	—	—	—		Non-album singles
"Ballin'" (featuring Wiz Khalifa and Teyana Taylor)	2013	—	—	—	—	—	—	—	—	—	—		Non-album singles
"Love Me Long Time" (featuring Future)	2013	—	—	—	—	—	—	—	—	—	—		Non-album singles
"Your Honor" (featuring Action Bronson)	2013	—	—	—	—	—	—	—	—	—	—		Darkside Vol. 3
"Another Day" (featuring Rick Ross, French Montana and Tiara Thomas)	2014	—	—	—	—	—	—	—	—	—	—		Non-album singles
"Stressin'" (featuring Jennifer Lopez)	2014	—	—	—	—	—	—	—	—	—	—		Non-album singles
"All the Way Up" (with Remy Ma featuring French Montana and Infared)	2016	27	9	5	—	85	—	—	—	—	157	RIAA: 2× Platinum; BPI: Gold; RMNZ: Platinum	Plata o Plomo
"Cookin" (with Remy Ma and French Montana featuring RySoValid)	2016	—	—	—	—	—	—	—	—	—	—		Plata o Plomo
"Money Showers" (with Remy Ma featuring Ty Dolla Sign)	2016	— (Note: "Money Showers" did not enter the Billboard Hot 100, but peaked at number 10 on the Bubbling Under Hot 100 Singles chart.)	46	—	—	—	—	—	—	—	—		Plata o Plomo
"Heartbreak" (with Remy Ma featuring The-Dream, Vindata)	2017	—	—	—	—	—	—	—	—	—	—		Plata o Plomo
"So Excited" (featuring Dre)	2017	— (Note: "So Excited" did not enter the Billboard Hot 100, but peaked at number 20 on the Bubbling Under Hot 100 Singles chart.)	— (Note: "So Excited" did not enter the Hot R&B/Hip-Hop Songs chart, but peaked at number five on the Bubbling Under R&B/Hip-Hop Singles chart.)	—	—	—	—	—	—	—	—		Non-album singles
"Pick It Up" (featuring Dre)	2018	—	—	—	—	—	—	—	—	—	—		Non-album singles
"Momma" (with Dre and Big Sean)	2018	—	—	—	—	—	—	—	—	—	—		Non-album singles
"Attention" (with Dre featuring Chris Brown)	2018	—	—	—	—	—	—	—	—	—	—		Non-album singles
"Pullin" (with Dre and Lil Wayne)	2019	—	—	—	—	—	—	—	—	—	—		Family Ties
"Yes" (with Cardi B and Anuel AA)	2019	— (Note: "Yes" did not enter the Billboard Hot 100, but peaked at number 15 on the Bubbling Under Hot 100 chart.)	— (Note: "Yes" did not enter the Hot R&B/Hip-Hop Songs chart, but peaked at number two on the Bubbling Under R&B/Hip-Hop Singles chart.)	—	—	—	—	—	—	—	—		Family Ties
"Deep" (with Dre)	2019	—	—	—	—	—	—	—	—	—	—		Family Ties
"Sunshine (The Light)" (featuring DJ Khaled and Amorphous)	2021	— (Note: "Sunshine (The Light)" did not enter the Billboard Hot 100, but peaked at number 11 on the Bubbling Under Hot 100 chart.)	46	—	—	—	—	—	— (Note: "Sunshine (The Light)" did not enter the NZ Top 40 Singles Chart, but peaked at number nine on the NZ Hot Singles Chart.)	—	53	BPI: Silver; RMNZ: Platinum	What Would Big Do 2021
"The Game" (with The Lox & Rick Ross)	2023	—	—	—	—	—	—	—	—	—	—		Non-album singles
"I Got You" (with Babyface)	2024	—	—	—	—	—	—	—	—	—	—		The World Changed On Me
"—" denotes a title that did not chart, or was not released in that territory.

=== As featured artist ===
List of singles as featured artist, with selected chart positions and certifications, showing year released and album name
Title	Year	Peak chart positions					Certifications	Album
Title	Year	US	US R&B	US Rap	CAN	UK	Certifications	Album
"1, 2 Pass It" (The D&D All-Stars)	1995	—	—	—	—	—		The D&D Project
"Boriquas on the Set" (Frankie Cutlass featuring Fat Joe, Evil Twins & Doo Wop)	1996	—	—	—	—	—		Politics & Bullshit
"Out for the Cash" (DJ Honda featuring Fat Joe, Common, Al' Tariq, The Beatnuts, Problemz)	1996	—	—	—	—	—		DJ Honda / Relativity Urban Assault
"Rise" (Veronica featuring Fat Joe)	1997	—	—	—	—	—		Rise
"Let the Games Begin" (Mack 10 featuring Fat Joe, Big Pun, CJ Mac)	1998	—	—	—	—	—		The Recipe
"Feelin' So Good" (Jennifer Lopez featuring Fat Joe and Big Pun)	2000	51	44	—	7	15	ARIA: Gold	On the 6
"Live Big" (Remix) (Sacario featuring Angie Martinez and Fat Joe)	2002	—	—	—	—	—		The Transporter (soundtrack)
"Shorty (Put It On the Floor)" (Busta Rhymes featuring Fat Joe, Chingy and Nick Cannon)	2003	—	101	—	—	—		Love Don't Cost a Thing (soundtrack)
"I Want You" (Thalía featuring Fat Joe)	2003	22	61	—	29	—		Thalía
"Not Your Average Joe" (DJ Kayslay featuring Fat Joe, Joe and Joe Budden)	2004	—	63	—	—	—		The Streetsweeper, Vol. 2
"New York" (Ja Rule featuring Fat Joe and Jadakiss)	2004	27	14	10	—	17		R.U.L.E.
"Hold You Down" (Jennifer Lopez featuring Fat Joe)	2005	64	—	—	—	6		Rebirth
"I Don't Care" (Ricky Martin featuring Amerie and Fat Joe)	2005	65	—	—	—	11		Life
"Holla at Me" (DJ Khaled featuring Lil Wayne, Paul Wall, Fat Joe, Rick Ross and Pitbull)	2006	59	24	15	—	—		Listennn... the Album
"Más Maíz" (N.O.R.E. featuring Nina Sky, Big Mato, La Negra of LDA, Fat Joe, Lumidee, Chingo Bling and Lil Rob)	2006	—	—	—	—	—		N.O.R.E. y la Familia...Ya Tú Sabe
"We Takin' Over" (DJ Khaled featuring Akon, T.I., Rick Ross, Fat Joe, Birdman and Lil Wayne)	2007	28	26	11	92	—	RIAA: Platinum; MC: Gold	We the Best
"All We Know" (DJ Absolut featuring Ace Hood, Ray J, Swizz Beatz, Bow Wow and Fat Joe)	2013	—	—	—	—	—		Non-album singles
"Nadie Como Tú" (Spanglish version) (Leslie Grace featuring Fat Joe)	2014	—	—	—	—	—		Non-album singles
"No Regrets" (DJ Kay Slay featuring Bun B, Fat Joe & Mc Gruff)	2017	—	—	—	—	—		The Big Brother
"Almost Like Praying" (Lin-Manuel Miranda featuring Puerto Ricans)	2017	20	—	—	—	—		Non-album singles
"God Bless" (Maino featuring Fat Joe & Fresh)	2017	—	—	—	—	—		Party & Pain
"Don't Know" (N.O.R.E. featuring Fat Joe)	2018	—	—	—	—	—		5E
"Basquiat" (Statik Selektah & Bun B featuring Fat Joe & Smoke DZA)	2019	—	—	—	—	—		TrillStatik
"Survive or Die" (Diamond D featuring Fat Joe, Fred the Godson & Raekwon)	2019	—	—	—	—	—		The Diam Piece 2
"New York Shit" (Sheek Louch featuring Havoc & Fat Joe)	2019	—	—	—	—	—		Beast Mode Vol. 3
"NYC" (Jim Jones featuring Fat Joe)	2019	—	—	—	—	—		El Capo
"Saturday Night Special" (LL Cool J featuring Rick Ross & Fat Joe)	2024	—	—	—	—	—		The Force
"—" denotes a title that did not chart, or was not released in that territory.

=== Promotional singles ===
List of promotional singles, showing year released and album name
Title	Year	Album
"I'm So Hood" (Remix) (DJ Khaled featuring Young Jeezy, Ludacris, Busta Rhymes, Big Boi, Lil Wayne, Fat Joe, Birdman and Rick Ross)	2007	We the Best
"All I Do Is Win" (Remix) (DJ Khaled featuring T-Pain, Diddy, Nicki Minaj, Rick Ross, Busta Rhymes, Fabolous, Jadakiss, Fat Joe and Swizz Beatz)	2010	Non-album single
"Welcome to My Hood" (Remix) (DJ Khaled featuring Ludacris, T-Pain, Busta Rhymes, Mavado, Twista, Birdman, Ace Hood, Fat Joe, Jadakiss, Bun B, Game and Waka Flocka Flame)	2011	We the Best Forever

== Other charted songs ==
List of songs, with selected chart positions, showing year released and album name
Title	Year	Peak chart positions				Album
Title	Year	US	US R&B	US Rap	NZ Hot	Album
"Fire Water" (Big Pun featuring Fat Joe, Raekwon and Armageddon)	1996	—	114	—	—	Endangered Species
"Who's That" (R. Kelly featuring Fat Joe)	2003	—	65	—	—	Chocolate Factory
"Girl I'm a Bad Boy" (featuring P. Diddy and Dre)	2003	122	69	25	—	Bad Boys II soundtrack
"Safe 2 Say (The Incredible)"	2005	—	101	—	—	All or Nothing
"My Fofo"	2005	—	103	—	—	All or Nothing
"Damn"	2006	—	112	—	—	Me, Myself, & I
"Jealousy"	2006	—	125	—	—	Me, Myself, & I
"Breathe and Stop" (featuring The Game)	2007	—	109	—	—	Me, Myself, & I
"No Problems" (featuring Rico Love)	2010	—	101	—	—	The Darkside Vol. 1
"Lord Above" (with Dre featuring Eminem and Mary J. Blige)	2019	97	44	—	33	Family Ties

== Guest appearances ==
List of non-single guest appearances, with other performing artists, showing year released and album name
Title	Year	Other artist(s)	Album
"Best-Kept Secret" (as Fat Joe da Gangsta)	1992	Diamond D, Bonita, LaReese, Whiz One	Stunts, Blunts and Hip Hop
"Pass Dat Shit" (as Fat Joe da Gangsta)	1992	Diamond D, Whiz One, Maestro, Mike G.Q.	Stunts, Blunts and Hip Hop
"A View from the Underground" (as Fat Joe da Gangsta)	1992	Diamond D	Stunts, Blunts and Hip Hop
"Beg No Friends" (as Fat Joe da Gangsta)	1993	Strickly Roots, Grand Puba	Beg No Friends
"The Rhythm"	1994	Bas Blasta, JuJu, Godfather Don, Lord Finesse	Dangerous 12"
"I'm Tryin' to Tell 'Em"	1994	—N/a	I Like It Like That (soundtrack)
"I Get Lifted"	1995	Barrio Boyzz	How We Roll
"De Automatic"	1995	KRS-One	KRS-One
"El Gran Combo"	1995	Main One, Joe Fatal, Kurious, Prince	Birth of the Ghetto Child
"Freestyle"	1995	Funkmaster Flex, Big Pun	The Mix Tape, Vol. 1
"I Shot Ya" (Remix)	1995	LL Cool J, Keith Murray, Prodigy, Foxy Brown	Mr. Smith
"Stay Away from the Nasty Hoes"	1996	Sadat X, Diamond D	America Is Dying Slowly
"You Don't Have to Worry" (Remix)	1996	New Edition	12"
"No Mercy"	1996	Flesh-n-Bone, Big Pun	T.H.U.G.S. (Trues Humbly United Gatherin' Souls)
"It's Too Late" (Remix)	1997	Tito Nieves	I Like It Like That
"5 Fingas of Death"	1997	Diamond D, Big L, A.G., Lord Finesse	Hatred, Passions and Infidelity
"Session"	1997	Blackface	Long Enough
"Internationally Known"	1997	D.I.T.C.	12"
"Wishful Thinking"	1997	Big Pun, B-Real, Kool G Rap	12"
"No Mas Tregua"	1997	Boricua Guerrero, Mexicano	First Combat
"Glamour Life"	1998	Big Pun, Cuban Link, Triple Seis, Armageddon	Capital Punishment
"Twinz (Deep Cover 98)"	1998	Big Pun	Capital Punishment
"Cross Bronx Expressway	1998	Lord Tariq and Peter Gunz, Big Pun	Make It Reign
"Freestyle ("At the Speed of Life")	1998	Funkmaster Flex, Big Pun, Terror Squad, Xzibit	The Mix Tape, Vol. III
"They Got Me"	1998	John Forté	Poly Sci
"All Love" {same verse as Blackface "Session"}	1998	D.I.T.C.	2"
"None Like You" (Remix)	1998	Aaron Hall, Big Pun, Cuban Link, Unique	Inside of You
"Tequila Sunrise (Remix)"	1998	Cypress Hill	12"
"Terror Squadians"	1998	Terror Squad	Rush Hour (soundtrack) / Don Cartagena
"What's Ya Point"	1998	Mia X, Snoop Dogg	Mama Drama
"Quiet on tha Set"	1998	Big Pun, Cuban Link	Straight Outta Compton: N.W.A 10th Anniversary Tribute
"When I Die"	1999	Krayzie Bone, Big Pun, Cuban Link	Thug Mentality 1999
"Heavy Weights"	1999	Big Pun, 8Ball	Violator: The Album
"Hea"	1999	CJ Mac, WC	Platinum Game
"Top of the World" (Remix)	1999	Brandy, Big Pun	Non-album single
"Underground Life"	1999	A.G., Party Arty, D-Flow	The Dirty Version
"Thicker than Blood"	1999	Terror Squad	Thicker than Water (soundtrack)
"Livin' La Vida Loca" (Remix)	1999	Ricky Martin, Big Pun, Cuban Link	Non-album single
"Get Breaded"	1999	E-40, Sauce Money	Charlie Hustle: The Blueprint of a Self-Made Millionaire
"Make the Crowd Roar"	1999	Big Pun, Armageddon	WCW Mayhem: The Music
"You Was Wrong"	2000	Big Pun, Drag-On, Remy Martin	Yeeeah Baby
"Love Don't Cost a Thing" (RJ Schoolyard Remix)	2000	Jennifer Lopez	12"
"U Know What's Up" (Millennium Rapdown Remix)	2000	Donell Jones, Xzibit, Pharoahe Monch, 50 Cent, Cuban Link, Treach	—N/a
"Get Yours"	2000	D.I.T.C.	D.I.T.C.
"The Enemy" {same track from '97}	2000	Big L	The Big Picture
"The Triboro"	2000	Big L, O.C., Remy Martin	The Big Picture
"Want Beef"	2000	C-Murder	Trapped in Crime
"My Lifestyle" (Remix)	2001	Funkmaster Flex, Jadakiss, Remy Martin	—N/a
"Ay Papi"	2001	Run–D.M.C.	Crown Royal
"Thug Love"	2001	Angie Martinez, Layzie Bone	Up Close and Personal
"Hustlin'"	2001	Armageddon	The Fast and the Furious (soundtrack)
"U Feel Me/Options"	2001	Havoc, Remy Martin, Capone	Violator: The Album, V2.0
"Come to the Temple"	2002	KRS-One, Rah Goddess, Rampage, Smooth B	Spiritual Minded
"South Park/South Bronx"	2002	Lone Star Ridaz, South Park Mexican	40 Dayz, 40 Nightz
"Nahmeanuheard" (Remix)	2002	N.O.R.E., Capone, Cam'ron, Cassidy	God's Favorite
"A Piece of Me"	2002	Luniz	Silver & Black
"Play No Games"	2002	Lil Jon & the East Side Boyz, Trick Daddy, Oobie	Kings of Crunk
"Salute Me" (Remix)	2002	Nas, Cassidy	Swizz Beatz Presents G.H.E.T.T.O. Stories
"Who's That"	2003	R. Kelly	Chocolate Factory
"C2G"	2003	Young N Restless	Cradle 2 the Grave (soundtrack)
"Good Times"	2003	Buju Banton, Beres Hammond	Friends for Life
"Chasing Papi"	2003	Huey Dunbar	Chasing Papi (soundtrack)
"I Never Like Ya Ass"	2003	DJ Kay Slay, Raekwon, Scarface	The Streetsweeper, Vol. 1
"Take a Look At My Life" (Remix)	2003	DJ Kay Slay, Remy Martin, A-Bless	The Streetsweeper, Vol. 1
"We Ridin'"	2003	—N/a	2 Fast 2 Furious (soundtrack)
"Back to Work"	2003	PMD, K-Solo	The Awakening
"Impatient"	2003	Blu Cantrell, Lil' Kim	Bittersweet
"Who Got Gunz"	2003	Gang Starr, M.O.P.	The Ownerz
"Me Pones Sexy (I Want You)"	2003	Thalía	Thalía
"Dirt"	2003	Mack 10, Damizza	Ghetto, Gutter & Gangsta
"Girl I'm a Bad Boy"	2003	P. Diddy, Dre	Bad Boys II (soundtrack)
"What Is Sexy"	2003	Ruben Studdard	Soulful
"Clientele Kidd"	2003	Raekwon, Ghostface Killah, Polite	The Lex Diamond Story
"Amor, Familia, Respect"	2004	K1	Nuestro Turno
"Capicu"	2004	Tony Touch, N.O.R.E., JuJu	The Piece Maker 2
"We Roll Deep"	2004	3 Way Funk, MC Ren	3 Way Funk
"The Truth"	2004	The X-Ecutioners, Aasim	Revolutions
"That's Nasty"	2004	Pitbull, Lil Jon	M.I.A.M.I.
"Grand Hang Out"	2004	Nelly, Jung Tru, Remy Martin	Sweat
"Quitate Two"	2004	Ivy Queen	Real
"It's the Pee Back 2 Work"	2004	Hit Squad, Mobb Deep	Zero Tolerance
"Live & Let Die"	2005	Diamond D	The Diamond Mine
"Take It Off"	2005	Loose Cannon, Tony Sunshine	Who Do U Think U R?
"Keep Sweatin'"	2005	Ray J	Raydiation
"Terremoto"	2005	Tito Nieves, Miguel Play	Hoy, Manana y Siempre
"Get Your Grind On"	2005	The Notorious B.I.G., Big Pun, Freeway	Duets: The Final Chapter
"Reggaetón Latino" (Chosen Few Remix)	2005	Don Omar, N.O.R.E., LDA	Da Hitman Presents Reggaetón Latino
"Tight"	2006	Remy Ma	There's Something About Remy: Based on a True Story
"Pop U"	2006	Juvenile, Ludacris	Reality Check
"Watch Out"	2006	DJ Khaled, Akon, Styles P, Rick Ross	Listennn... the Album
"Yomo Dele"	2006	Hector "El Father", Yomo	Los Rompe Discotekas
"Dirty N.Y."	2006	Lake & Cormega	My Brother's Keeper
"Fighting Over Me"	2006	Paris Hilton, Jadakiss	Paris
"In the Ghetto"	2006	DJ Kay Slay & Greg Street, Cassidy, Jim Jones, Sheek Louch, Shaquille O'Neal, Busta Rhymes	The Champions: North Meets South
"Ya'Meen"	2006	Method Man, Styles P	4:21... The Day After
"Cohiba"	2006	Mario Vazquez, Knox	Mario Vazquez
"About All That"	2006	Birdman & Lil Wayne	Like Father, Like Son
"Qué Tú Sabes D'eso"	2006	Pitbull, Sinful	El Mariel
"Stay Up"	2006	Miss Issa	Hurt No More
"You Don't Really Wanna"	2006	DJ Clue?, Remy Ma	The Professional 3
"I Can See Them"	2007	Ace Mac	All Ace's Mixtape Vol. 1
"Never Gonna Change"	2007	Ace Mac	All Ace's Mixtape Vol. 1
"Touch Your Toes"	2007	Armand Van Helden, BL	Ghettoblaster
"Brown Paper Bag"	2007	DJ Khaled, Young Jeezy, Dre, Juelz Santana, Rick Ross, Lil Wayne	We the Best
"New York Is Back"	2007	DJ Khaled, Jadakiss, Ja Rule	We the Best
"Me Odio" (Hip-Hop Remix)	2007	Gloria Estefan	"Me Odio"
"Jangueo"	2007	Wisin & Yandel, Erick Right	Wisin vs. Yandel: Los Extraterrestres
"Make Way"	2007	Birdman, Lil Wayne	5 ★ Stunna
"Rubber Grip"	2008	Sheek Louch, Styles P	Silverback Gorilla
"Drop It-N-Rock It"	2008	Mr. Criminal, Fingazz	Rise 2 Power
"Come and Party with Me"	2008	LL Cool J, Sheek Louch	Exit 13
"Go Ahead"	2008	DJ Khaled, Fabolous, Lloyd, Rick Ross, Flo Rida	We Global
"We Global"	2008	DJ Khaled, Trey Songz, Ray J	We Global
"Intro"	2008	Diamond D	The Huge Hefner Chronicles
"Mafia Music" (Remix)	2009	Rick Ross, The Game, Ja Rule	—N/a
"Oh Baby"	2009	K.A.R.	Joe Crack & Pistol Pete Present: K.A.R.
"This Is the X"	2009	K.A.R., Hell Rell	Joe Crack & Pistol Pete Present: K.A.R.
"What You Gonna Do to Me"	2009	K.A.R.	Joe Crack & Pistol Pete Present: K.A.R.
"Witness tha Realest"	2009	Tha Realest	Witness Tha Realest
"It's Over" (Remix)	2010	Armageddon, N.O.R.E., DJ Doo Wop	The Journal Vol. 1: Rebirth
"Philly" (Mega Mix)	2011	Game, Young Chris, Eve, Black Thought, Money Malc, Fred the Godson, Diggy Simmons, Jermaine Dupri	Purp & Patron
"One Shot (Killed for Less)"	2011	Joell Ortiz	Free Agent
"One Hundred and Ten"	2011	Jamie Drastik	Champagne And Cocaine
"Greystone"	2012	The Game, Young Chris, Sam Hook	California Republic
"Gun Game"	2012	Fred the Godson	Gordo Frederico
"In This Bitch"	2012	DJ Christion, Ace Hood, Famous Kid Brick	—N/a
"Goodbye" (Remix)	2012	Slaughterhouse	—N/a
"Games and Things"	2012	Chi Ali	—N/a
"Don't Go Over There"	2012	French Montana, Wale	Mac & Cheese 3
"Hip-Hop"	2012	French Montana	Mac & Cheese 3
"Hello Love" (Remix)	2013	T. Rone, Juicy J, Jim Jones, Raheem Devaughn	—N/a
"Take It to the Bronx"	2013	Tony Touch, KRS-One, Sadat X	The Piece Maker 3: Return of the 50 MC's
"Free Again"	2014	DJ Kay Slay, 50 Cent	The Rise of a City
"It's Not a Game"	2014	DJ Kay Slay, Ghostface Killah, Raekwon, Sheek Louch, McGruff, N.O.R.E., Lil' Fame, Prodigy, Rell	The Rise of a City
"It's Nothin'"	2014	Diamond D, Chi Ali, Freddie Foxxx	The Diam Piece
"Tranquila"	2014	Thalía	Amore Mio
"Dime A Mi Quien"	2015	Ivy Queen	Vendetta
"Im Bout It"	2015	Troy Ave	Major Without a Deal
"Don't Ever Play Yourself"	2016	DJ Khaled, Jadakiss, Fabolous, Busta Rhymes, Kent Jones	Major Key
"Billy Ocean"	2017	DJ Khaled, Raekwon	Grateful
"Cocaine White"	2018	Freeway	Think Free
"Kelly's Corner"	2019	Westside Gunn	HWH VII
"A Star Is Born"	2019	David Bars	The Bar Code
"Talkin' Back"	2021	Harry Fraud, Benny the Butcher	The Plugs I Met 2
"Apeshit"	2022	Sheek Louch	Beast Mode 5
"How We Get It"	2023	AZ	Truth Be Told
"Cape Fear"	2024	Ghostface KIllah	Set the Tone (Guns & Roses)
"God's Child"	2024	Mary J Blige	Gratitude
