= Fight the Power =

Fight the Power may refer to:

- "Fight the Power (Part 1 & 2)", a 1975 song by the Isley Brothers
- "Fight the Power" (Public Enemy song) (1989)
- Fight the Power... Live!, a 1989 music video compilation by Public Enemy
- Fight the Power: Greatest Hits Live!, a 2007 live album by Public Enemy
- "Fight the Power", a 2008 eighth season episode of DeGrassi: The Next Generation
- ECW Fight the Power, a 1996 professional wrestling event
- Fight the Power: How Hip-Hop Changed the World, 2023 history of rap documentary
