= Amorphous (DJ) =

- Born: Jimir Reece Davis; December 31, 1997 (age 28)
- Genres: R&B; pop; mashup; hip hop
- Instruments: Laptop, turntables
- Years active: 2017—present

Jimir Reece Davis (born December 31, 1997), known professionally as Amorphous, is an American record producer and disc jockey. He is best known for his guest appearance alongside DJ Khaled on Fat Joe's 2021 single "Sunshine (The Light)", which entered the Bubbling Under Hot 100 chart. He is noted for the use of mashups in his production; his viral mashup of Rihanna's "Kiss It Better" and Luther Vandross's "Never Too Much" is heard in the aforementioned single.

== Early life and education ==
Davis was raised in Huntingdon Valley, near Philadelphia. He attended Abington Friends School, Lower Moreland High School and graduated with his bachelor's degree in film from Full Sail University in 2018.

He began producing music in his youth with the Timbaland PsP game Beaterator. He worked as a DJ a few times as a college student but primarily produced music at home. Amorphous moved to Los Angeles after college to pursue a professional music career. He experienced financial troubles due to his inability to find work, which prompted him to move back home.

== Career ==
Amorphous gained wide prominence in 2020 after posting a mashup of the Luther Vandross song "Never Too Much" and Rihanna’s "Kiss It Better" to Twitter. The clip was viewed approximately three million times and led to a collaboration with DJ Khaled and Fat Joe, who used the track in the song "Sunshine (The Light)." The song peaked at number 6 on Billboard's Rhythmic Airplay chart.

Amorphous released his debut EP Things Take Shape featuring Kelly Rowland, James Fauntleroy, Kehlani, RAYE and Brandy in July 2021. He also worked with Mariah Carey for the "Butterfly" 25th Anniversary Club Remix. In 2023, Amorphous worked on the musical arrangement team for Beyoncé's Renaissance World Tour.

== Personal life ==
He is gay.

== Discography ==
=== EPs ===
- Things Take Shape (2021)

=== Singles ===
- "Sunshine (The Light)" (with Fat Joe, DJ Khaled) (2021)
- "Finally (Cannot Hide It)" (with Kelly Rowland) (2021)
- "Back Together" (with Kehlani) (2021)
