= Ain't Sayin' Nothin' =

"Ain't Sayin' Nothin"

Single by Fat Joe featuring Plies and Dre

from the album The Elephant in the Room
- Released: May 5, 2008
- Recorded: 2007
- Genre: Hip hop
- Length: 3:34
- Label: Terror Squad/Imperial/Virgin
- Songwriters: Joseph Cartagena, Dre (producer), Eddie Montilla, Marcello Valenzano, Algernod Washington
- Producer: Cool & Dre

Fat Joe singles chronology
"I Won't Tell" (2007)	"Ain't Sayin' Nothin" (2008)	"One" (2009)

Plies singles chronology
"Bust It Baby Pt. 2" (2007)	"Ain't Sayin' Nothin'" (2008)	"Out Here Grindin" (2008)

Dre singles chronology
"100 Million" (2007)	"Ain't Sayin' Nothin'" (2008)	"Hot Revolver" (2009)

"Ain't Sayin' Nothin'" is the second single from Fat Joe's album The Elephant in the Room. It also has a sample of Cocababy at the end of the video. The song features Plies and Dre. Lil Wayne, Ace Hood, Rocko, DJ Khaled, Rick Ross, Cool (of Cool & Dre), Birdman, Danja & Pitbull made appearances in the video. The song peaked at number 93 on the US Hot R&B/Hip-Hop Songs chart.

== Remix ==
The official remix was made, featuring rappers The Game and Lil Wayne with a new verse by Fat Joe himself and Dre still on the chorus. In the remix, Fat Joe mocks his rival, G-Unit rapper 50 Cent, by saying, "You heard Game his enemies' my enemy Young Buck callin me say he wanna be a friend of me." This is in reference to both The Game and Young Buck leaving G-Unit.

== Charts ==
Chart (2009)	Peak position
US Hot R&B/Hip-Hop Songs (Billboard)	93
