= We the Best =

Studio album by DJ Khaled
- Released: June 12, 2007
- Recorded: 2006–2007
- Studio: Terror Squad Studios The Bronx, New York City, New York, North Miami, Florida, Dade
- Genre: Hip-hop
- Length: 65:49
- Label: Terror Squad; Koch
- Producer: DJ Khaled; Cool & Dre; Jim Jonsin; Diaz Brothers

DJ Khaled chronology
Listennn... the Album (2006)	We the Best (2007)	We Global (2008)

Singles from We the Best
- 1. "We Takin' Over" Released: March 27, 2007; 2. "I'm So Hood" Released: August 28, 2007; 3. "Brown Paper Bag" Released: Oct.15, 2007

We the Best is the second studio album by American disc jockey and record producer DJ Khaled. It was released on June 12, 2007, by Terror Squad Entertainment and Koch Records. Khaled, alongside fellow American rapper Fat Joe, handled as the executive producers on the album. The album also was produced by The Runners, Drumma Boy, Cool & Dre, J.U.S.T.I.C.E. League, Diaz Brothers, and Jim Jonsin; as well as this record features guest appearances from T-Pain, Akon, Rick Ross, Brisco, Flo Rida, Fat Joe, Cool & Dre, Juelz Santana, Jim Jones, Plies, Birdman, Lil Wayne, Trick Daddy, Bone Thugs-n-Harmony, Game, Ja Rule, Jadakiss, Trina, Paul Wall, Bun B, T.I., and Young Jeezy, among others.

Upon its release, We the Best received a mixed reception from critics, who found some of the tracks enjoyable and engaging, but felt it was bloated with lesser tracks and Khaled's persistent ad-libbing throughout the album. The record debuted at number eight on the US Billboard 200. As of January 2008, the album has sold 440,000 copies in the United States. It was supported by two singles: "We Takin' Over" (featuring T.I., Akon, Rick Ross, Fat Joe, Birdman, and Lil Wayne), and the other Rick Ross-featured track, "I'm So Hood", alongside T-Pain, Trick Daddy, and Plies.

== Singles ==
The album's lead single, called "We Takin' Over" was released on April 1, 2007. The song features guest vocals from American rappers T.I., Rick Ross, Fat Joe, Birdman, and Lil Wayne, alongside the musician Akon. The song was produced by Danja.

The album's second single, "I'm So Hood" was released on August 28, 2007. The song features guest vocals from American recording artist T-Pain, alongside fellow American rappers Trick Daddy, Plies, and Rick Ross (whom recently featured on the track and its previous single, "We Takin' Over"). The song was produced by The Runners.

The album's promotional singles features two of the album's tracks—"I'm From The Ghetto" and "Brown Paper Bag"—in which has been released sometime in 2007.

== Reception ==
=== Critical reception ===
Professional ratings
Review scores
Source	Rating
AllMusic	3/5 stars
DJBooth	2/5 stars
Entertainment Weekly	C
HipHopDX	3/5 stars
Pitchfork	4.8/10
RapReviews	7.5/10
Rolling Stone	3/5 stars

We the Best received a generally mixed reception from music critics. Steve 'Flash' Juon of RapReviews praised the album for showcasing great lyricism and production from some of the best rappers and producers working at the time but found Khaled's repeated trademark phrases annoying, concluding with: "Other than that though this album is good - hell it's even summer banger ride in your Jeep with it 'til October good. Just don't fool yourself into thinking that Khaled had anything to do with it other than putting the right people together in the right place at the right time." Rolling Stone's Christian Hoard said that Khaled's beats weren't anything innovative but were used well thanks to a huge list of guest artists and tracks like "Hit Them Up" and "Brown Paper Bag" that he credited for being "big, dumb pleasures, just begging to blast from your SUV." AllMusic editor David Jeffries also praised the album for collecting a lot of capable guest artists to deliver great lyricism but found some of Khaled's catchphrases and geographical jumping through his producers as the album's shortcomings, concluding that, "Much more frustrating than a failure, We the Best earns a slight thumbs up if you think of it as a disjointed soundtrack or four-hit mixtape."

Andres Tardio of HipHopDX commented on the various tracks throughout the album, saying that some of them can grab the attention of the listeners but others will feel tiring with the overabundance of guest artists and their lack of focus in the lyrics. Pitchfork contributor Tom Breihan said that after the first single, the album starts to sound rote and generic with tracks that deliver more swagger-rap and less thought-provoking substance, concluding that "We the Best, it turns out, is indicative of one of the major problems with mainstream rap lately: too many rappers seem unwilling to drop their defenses and speak plainly." Nathan Slavik of DJBooth gave credit to the first two singles for having great production and solid artists performing on them but felt the rest of the track listing can get overbloated, saying "We the Best will hit at the charts, but as soon as the next major release comes around it will be forgotten."

=== Commercial performance ===
The album debuted at number 8 on the US Billboard 200, selling 79,000 copies in its first week. As of January 2008, the album has sold 440,000 copies in the United States.

== Track listing ==
No.	Title	Writer(s)	Producer(s)	Length
1.	"Intro (We the Best)" (featuring Rick Ross)	Khaled Khaled; William Roberts II	DJ Khaled	1:57
2.	"The Movement (Skit)" (featuring K. Foxx)	Kim "K. Foxx" Jefferson		0:22
3.	"We Takin' Over" (featuring Akon, T.I., Rick Ross, Fat Joe, Birdman, and Lil Wayne)	Khaled; Clifford Harris, Jr.; Aliaune Thiam; Roberts II; Joseph Cartagena; Bryan Williams; Dwayne Carter, Jr.; Floyd Nathaniel Hills	Danja	4:24
4.	"Brown Paper Bag" (featuring Dre, Young Jeezy, Juelz Santana, Fat Joe, Rick Ross, and Lil Wayne)	Khaled; Jay Jenkins; LaRon James; Roberts II; Carter, Jr.; Cartagena; Barry Gibb; Maurice Gibb; Robin Gibb; Marcello Valenzano; Andre Lyon	Cool & Dre	4:57
5.	"I'm So Hood" (featuring T-Pain, Trick Daddy, Rick Ross, and Plies)	Khaled; Faheem Najm; Maurice Young; Roberts II; Algernod Washington	The Runners	4:15
6.	"Before the Solution" (featuring Beanie Sigel and Pooh Bear)	Khaled; Dwight Grant; Jason "Pooh Bear" Boyd	Khaled	4:29
7.	"I'm from the Ghetto" (featuring Dre, The Game, Jadakiss, and Trick Daddy)	Khaled; Jayceon Taylor; Jason Phillips; Young; Valenzano; Lyon	Cool & Dre; Khaled	5:06
8.	"Hit 'Em Up" (featuring Bun B and Paul Wall)	Khaled; Bernard Freeman; Paul Slayton; Harr; Jackson	Khaled	3:20
9.	""S" on My Chest" (featuring Birdman and Lil Wayne)	Khaled; Williams; Carter, Jr.; Daniel Johnson	Kane Beatz; Khaled	4:10
10.	"Bitch I'm from Dade County" (featuring Dre, Trick Daddy, Trina, Rick Ross, Brisco, Flo Rida, and C-Ride)	Khaled; Lyon; Young; Katrina Taylor; Roberts II; British Mitchell; Tramar Dillard; Christian "C-Ride" Coates	Khaled	5:48
11.	"The Originators" (featuring Bone Thugs-n-Harmony)	Khaled; Anthony Henderson; Byron McCane; Charles Scruggs; Stanley Howse; Steve Howse	Khaled	6:18
12.	"New York" (featuring Ja Rule, Fat Joe, and Jadakiss)	Khaled; Jeffrey Atkins; Cartagena; Phillips; Valenzano; Lyon	Cool & Dre	5:54

Wal-Mart edition (bonus tracks)
No.	Title	Writer(s)	Producer(s)	Length
13.	"I'm So Hood (Remix)" (featuring T-Pain, Young Jeezy, Ludacris, Busta Rhymes, Big Boi, Fat Joe, Birdman, Rick Ross, and Lil Wayne)	Khaled; Najm; Jenkins; Christopher Bridges; Trevor Smith; Antwan Patton; Williams; Roberts II; Carter, Jr.; Cartagena; Harr; Jackson	Khaled	5:42

Best Buy bonus tracks
No.	Title	Writer(s)	Producer(s)	Length
13.	"The Streets" (featuring Shareefa and Willy Northpole)	Khaled; Sharieefah Cooper; William Adams; Harr; Jackson	Khaled	3:46
14.	"No Hook" (featuring Jim Jones, Styles P, Cassidy, and Rob Cash)	Khaled; Joseph Jones; David Styles; Barry Reese; Steve Morales	Morales	3:55
15.	"Choppers" (featuring Dre, Joe Hound, and C-Ride)	Khaled; Valenzano; Lyon	Cool & Dre; Khaled	4:47
16.	"Make It Rain (Remix)" (performed by Fat Joe featuring Lil Wayne, R. Kelly, T.I., Birdman, Rick Ross, and Ace Mac)	Cartagena; Carter, Jr.; Robert Kelly; Harris, Jr.; Williams; Roberts II; Khaled	Storch	7:00
17.	"Sexy Lady (Remix)" (performed by Yung Berg featuring Jim Jones and Rich Boy)	Christopher Ward; Jones; Marece Richards	Rob Holladay; Khaled	4:46

Notes

- On the Wal-Mart edition of the album, "Hit 'Em Up", was being removed from its track listing on the album.
- "Intro (We the Best)" and "**** I'm from Dade County" do not include the vocals from Rick Ross in some markets and only his vocals included on the Best Buy edition.
- Tracks "187" and "Hit 'Em Up" are not included in the digital version.

Sample credits

- "We Takin' Over" contains a sample of "C.R.E.A.M." as performed by Wu-Tang Clan.
- "Brown Paper Bag" contains a sample of "If I Can't Have You" as performed by Yvonne Elliman.
- "S" on My Chest" contains a sample of "Get Your Shine On" as performed by Birdman.

== Personnel ==
Credits for We the Best adapted from AllMusic.

- Robert "Big Briz" Brisbane – engineer
- Ryan Deaunovich – mixing assistant
- Luis Diaz – mixing
- Ben Diehl – assistant engineer, mixing assistant
- Jeff Edwards – engineer
- John Franck – video producer
- Abel Garibaldi – engineer, programming
- Paul Grosso – creative director
- Thomas "T" Hatcher – bass guitar
- Terrell Jones – stylist
- Andrew Kelley – art direction, design
- Ian Mereness – Pro Tools
- Eddie Montilla – piano
- Regena Ratcliffe – print production
- Leroy Barbie Romans – keyboards
- Douglas Sadler – producer
- Paul Alfonso – SEIR
- Gina Victoria – assistant engineer

== Charts ==
=== Weekly charts ===
Weekly chart performance
Chart (2007)	Peak position
Canadian Albums (Nielsen SoundScan)	38
US Billboard 200	8
US Independent Albums (Billboard)	1
US Top R&B/Hip-Hop Albums (Billboard)	2
US Top Rap Albums (Billboard)	2

=== Year-end charts ===
2007 year-end chart performance
Chart (2007)	Position
US Billboard 200	193
US Independent Albums (Billboard)	11
US Top R&B/Hip-Hop Albums (Billboard)	56

2008 year-end chart performance
Chart (2008)	Position
US Independent Albums (Billboard)	50
