= Make It Rain (Fat Joe song) =

2006 single by Fat Joe

Single by Fat Joe featuring Lil Wayne

from the album Me, Myself & I
- Released: October 31, 2006
- Studio: The Hit Factory Miami (Miami, Florida)
- Genre: Hip hop
- Length: 4:11
- Label: EMI; Virgin; Terror Squad
- Songwriters: J. Cartagena; S. Storch; D. Carter
- Producer: Scott Storch

Fat Joe singles chronology
"I Don't Care" (2005)	"Make It Rain" (2006)	"Make It Rain (Remix)" (2007)

Lil Wayne singles chronology
"You" (2006)	"Make It Rain" (2006)	"Leather So Soft" (2006)

"Make It Rain (Remix)"

Single by Fat Joe featuring R. Kelly, T.I., Lil Wayne, Birdman, Rick Ross and Ace Mac

from the album We the Best
- Released: March 13, 2007
- Recorded: December 2006
- Genre: Hip hop
- Length: 5:44 (main remix version); 7:04 (original extended remix version)
- Label: Terror Squad
- Songwriters: Joseph Cartagena; Robert Sylvester Kelly; Clifford Joseph Harris Jr.; Dwayne Michael Carter, Jr.; Bryan Williams; William Leonard Roberts II; Ace Mac; Scott Storch
- Producer: Scott Storch

Fat Joe singles chronology
"Make It Rain" (2007)	"Make It Rain (Remix)" (2007)	"We Takin' Over" (2007)

R. Kelly singles chronology
"I'm a Flirt (Remix)" (2007)	"Make It Rain (Remix)" (2007)	"Same Girl" (2007)

T.I. singles chronology
"I'm a Flirt (Remix)" (2007)	"Make It Rain (Remix)" (2007)	"We Takin' Over" (2007)

Lil Wayne singles chronology
"Hollywood Divorce" (2006)	"Make It Rain (Remix)" (2007)	"We Takin' Over" (2007)

Birdman singles chronology
"Leather So Soft" (2007)	"Make It Rain (Remix)" (2007)	"We Takin' Over" (2007)

Rick Ross singles chronology
"Born-N-Raised" (2006)	"Make It Rain (Remix)" (2007)	"We Takin' Over" (2007)

Ace Mac singles chronology
"Out of Town" (2007)	"Make It Rain (Remix)" (2007)	"Hold Up" (2008)

"Make It Rain" is a song by American rapper Fat Joe, released in 2006 as the first single from his seventh album Me, Myself & I. It features American rapper Lil Wayne, who only raps the chorus (but contributes a verse on the remix), and was produced by Scott Storch. The song peaked at number 13 on the US Billboard Hot 100. It was released through EMI, Virgin Records, and Fat Joe's Terror Squad Entertainment.

It was nominated for a Best Rap Performance by a Duo or Group at the 50th Annual Grammy Awards. The Exclusive Def Jam Version, which does not feature Lil Wayne and instead has a hook by Fat Joe, is featured in the game Def Jam: Icon and is Fat Joe's fighting song.

== Composition ==
Fat Joe was on a tour stop in Memphis, he decided he wanted to make a southern style hip-hop song after hearing what the local clubs were playing. He also realized there was no popular songs for strip clubs with lyrics of throwing money. Fat Joe enlisted Storch to make a southern sounding beat which the producer was initially opposed to. Producer Irv Gotti recommended to have Lil Wayne, who was from the southern U.S., instead to match the regional sound of the record. Fat Joe having already written the chorus, sent the demo to Lil Wayne who sent back the final version of the song the next day.

== Chart performance ==
Make It Rain debuted at number 55 on the US Billboard Hot 100 chart, on the week of November 18, 2006. After climbing the chart for 13 weeks, the song reached its peak at number 13 on the chart dated February 17, 2007. On May 15, 2007, the single was certified platinum by the Recording Industry Association of America (RIAA) for sales of over a million downloads in the United States.

== Music video ==
DJ Khaled, Cool & Dre, Scott Storch, Birdman, Diddy, Rick Ross, Trina, Oliver Coats, Triple C, Hennessi, Emry L Moore and Young Money make cameo appearances in the video. Some of the scenes of the video pay homage to the late Big Pun's classic video "Still Not a Player". The video was directed by Chris Robinson and VinCock and produced by Nicole Acacio for production company Robot Films.

== Remix ==
A remix was recorded in December 2006 and released as a single in 2007. It features American singer R. Kelly and American rappers T.I., Lil Wayne, Birdman, Rick Ross and Ace Mac, as well as uncredited vocals by DJ Khaled, and was produced by Scott Storch. There is also an official video for the remix. Sean Kingston has made his own version.

=== Music video ===
The video was directed by R. Malcolm Jones and features guest appearances by Fonzworth Bentley, Scott Storch, DJ Khaled and Trina.

=== Track listing ===
Promo CD single

1. "Make It Rain" (remix; edited)
2. "Make It Rain" (remix; explicit)

Digital download single

1. "Make It Rain" (remix)

== Charts ==
=== Weekly charts ===
Chart (2006–2007)	Peak position
Deutsche Black Charts	11
New Zealand (RIANZ)	14
US Billboard Hot 100	13
US Hot R&B/Hip-Hop Songs (Billboard)	6
US Hot Rap Tracks (Billboard)	2
US Pop 100 (Billboard)	26
US Rhythmic Airplay (Billboard)	8

=== Year-end charts ===
Chart (2007)	position
US Billboard Hot 100	43
US Hot R&B/Hip-Hop Songs (Billboard)	32
US Rhythmic (Billboard)	40

== Certifications ==
Region	Certification	Certified units/sales
Canada (Music Canada) Ringtone	Platinum	40,000^{*}
United States (RIAA)	Gold	500,000^{*}
United States (RIAA) (Mastertone)	Platinum	1,000,000^{*}
^{*} Sales figures based on certification alone.
