= Represent (Fat Joe album) =

Studio album by Fat Joe da Gangsta
- Released: July 27, 1993
- Recorded: 1992–1993
- Genre: Hip hop
- Length: 49:34
- Labels: Relativity; Violator
- Producers: Diamond D; Lord Finesse; the Beatnuts; Showbiz; Chilly Dee

Fat Joe da Gangsta chronology
Represent (1993)	Jealous One's Envy (1995)

Singles from Represent
- 1. "Flow Joe" Released: May 20, 1993; 2. "Watch the Sound" Released: 1994; 3. "The Shit Is Real" Released: 1994

Represent is the debut studio album by American rapper Fat Joe da Gangsta. The album's lead single "Flow Joe" peaked number 82 on the Billboard Hot 100 by late 1993. In mid-1994, he released his second single "Watch the Sound" followed by "The Shit Is Real", featuring a remix by DJ Premier, which would appear on Joe's second album.

== Critical reception ==
Professional ratings
Review scores
Source	Rating
AllMusic	2.5/5 stars
The Philadelphia Inquirer	2.5/4 stars
RapReviews	7.5/10
Rolling Stone	3/5 stars
Rolling Stone Album Guide	2.5/5 stars
The Source	3.5/5 stars

The Philadelphia Inquirer wrote that, "as a gangsta, Fat Joe's tough delivery is convincing, but he doesn't exhibit anything approaching the lyrical complexity or narrative skills of such OGs as the two Ices from LA."

== Track listing ==
No.	Title	Producer(s)	Length
1.	"A Word to da Wise"		0:20
2.	"Livin' Fat"	Lord Finesse	3:39
3.	"My Man Ski"		0:50
4.	"Bad Bad Man"	Diamond D	3:50
5.	"Watch the Sound" (featuring Grand Puba and Diamond D)	Diamond D	4:22
6.	"Flow Joe"	Diamond D	4:17
7.	"Da Fat Gangsta"	Diamond D	4:07
8.	"Shorty Gotta Fat Ass"	Diamond D	3:19
9.	"This Shit Is Real"	The Beatnuts	4:45
10.	"You Must Be Out of Your Fuckin' Mind" (featuring Apache and Kool G Rap)	Diamond D	3:57
11.	"I Got This in a Smash"	Showbiz	4:12
12.	"Another Wild Nigger from the Bronx" (featuring Gismo, Keith Keith, and King Sun)	Chilly Dee	5:32
13.	"Get On Up"	Diamond D	4:06
14.	"I'm a Hit That"	Showbiz	2:25
Total length:			49:34

== Credits ==
- Recorded at Jazzy Jay's Recording Studio
- Mixed at Powerplay by Chris Conway
- Producers: Diamond D, Lord Finesse, the Beatnuts, Showbiz, Chilly Dee
- Executive Producers: Chris Lighty and Fat Joe
- Scratches: DJ Roc Raida, DJ Rob Swift
- Mastered: Michael Sarsfield

== Charts ==
Chart (1993)	Peak position
US Top R&B/Hip-Hop Albums (Billboard)	46
