= We Takin' Over =

Single by DJ Khaled featuring Akon, T.I., Rick Ross, Fat Joe, Baby and Lil Wayne

from the album We the Best
- Released: March 27, 2007
- Recorded: 2006
- Genre: Hip hop
- Length: 4:31
- Label: Terror Squad; Koch
- Songwriters: Aliaune Thiam; Clifford Harris, Jr.; Jose Cartagena; William Roberts II; Bryan Williams; Dwayne Carter; Nathaniel Hills; Khaled Khaled
- Producer: Danja

DJ Khaled singles chronology
"Born-N-Raised" (2006)	"We Takin' Over" (2007)	"I'm So Hood" (2007)

Akon singles chronology
"I Tried" (2007)	"We Takin' Over" (2007)	"The Way She Moves" (2007)

T.I. singles chronology
"Make It Rain (Remix)" (2007)	"We Takin' Over" (2007)	"Big Shit Poppin' (Do It)" (2007)

Rick Ross singles chronology
"Make It Rain (Remix)" (2007)	"We Takin' Over" (2007)	"Get That Bread" (2007)

Fat Joe singles chronology
"Make It Rain (Remix)" (2007)	"We Takin' Over" (2007)	"I Won't Tell" (2007)

Baby singles chronology
"Make It Rain (Remix)" (2007)	"We Takin' Over" (2007)	"Pop Bottles" (2007)

Lil Wayne singles chronology
"Make It Rain (Remix)" (2007)	"We Takin' Over" (2007)	"You Ain't Know" (2007)

"We Takin' Over" is the first single from American record producer DJ Khaled's second album, We the Best. Akon, T.I., Rick Ross, Fat Joe, Baby, and Lil Wayne are all featured on this hip hop track. Nate "Danja" Hills assisted the artists in writing the song and is also the producer.

The song was released through the iTunes Store on March 27, 2007. The song debuted at number 51 on the US Hot R&B/Hip-Hop Songs chart and has since peaked at number 26 on the chart. It debuted on the US Billboard Hot 100 on the issue date of April 14, 2007, at number 75, and has since peaked at number 28 on the chart.

== Music video ==
Cameos in the video are made by Pitbull, Bun B, Junior Reid, Brisco, DJ Infamous, Freeway, Triple C's, Dolla, Johnny Dang, T-Pain, Trina, Curren$y, and Cool & Dre among others. The video was inspired by Crime Mob's video for "Rock Yo Hips". The video was styled by Armend Cobi and directed by Gil Green.

== Critical reception ==
VIBE selected Lil Wayne's guest appearance in "We Takin' Over" to be his best of 2007, ranking the song at No. 1 on their list of the 77 best Lil Wayne songs and appearances.

== Remix ==
- "We Takin' Over" (Official Remix) (featuring R. Kelly, Akon, T-Pain, Lil' Kim and Young Jeezy)

Lil' Wayne recorded a remix/freestyle of 'We Takin' Over', known to some as 'My Daddy' for his mixtape, Da Drought 3. Nicki Minaj also recorded a remix/freestyle of 'We Takin' Over', titled 'Playtime Is Over' for her mixtape, Playtime Is Over. Female rappers Trina, Remy Ma and Jacki-O, and singers Lil' Mo, and DJ Lazy K recorded a remix for Remy Ma's mixtape, Shesus Khryst, which was also featured on Trina's mixtape, Rockstarr Royalty, albeit slightly edited. Flo Rida also has a remix called the "Poe Boy Remix" from his Mr. Birthday Man mixtape. It features Brisco, Triple C's, and Ashley Ross. The song was also re-released in 2011 as a single by singer Akon, who was also featured on the original release in 2007.

== Charts ==
=== Weekly charts ===
Chart (2007)	Peak position
Canada Hot 100 (Billboard)	92
Germany (Deutsche Black Charts)	19
US Billboard Hot 100	28
US Hot R&B/Hip-Hop Songs (Billboard)	26
US Hot Rap Songs (Billboard)	11
US Pop 100 (Billboard)	36
US Rhythmic Airplay (Billboard)	30

=== Year-end charts ===
Chart (2007)	Position
US Hot R&B/Hip-Hop Songs (Billboard)	93

== Certifications ==
Region	Certification	Certified units/sales
Canada (Music Canada)	Gold	20,000^{*}
United States (RIAA)	Platinum	1,000,000^{^}
^{*} Sales figures based on certification alone.^{^} Shipments figures based on certification alone.
