= Flow Joe =

Single by Fat Joe da Gangsta

from the album Represent
- B-side: "Livin' Fat"
- Released: May 20, 1993
- Recorded: 1993
- Genre: Hip hop
- Length: 4:17
- Label: Relativity
- Songwriters: J. Cartagena; Joseph Kirkland
- Producer: Diamond D

Fat Joe singles chronology
"Flow Joe" (1993)	"Watch the Sound" (1993)

Music video
- "Flow Joe" on YouTube

"Flow Joe" is the debut single by American rapper Fat Joe da Gangsta, from his debut album, Represent (1993). It contains samples of "Get Out of My Life, Woman" by Lee Dorsey and "The Long Wait" by Morton Stevens. The music video for the single depicts Fat Joe and his posse in an alley, also standing on a fire escape at the side of a building. The video flashes from black and white, to color.

== Charts ==
Chart (1993)	Peak position
US Billboard Hot 100	89
US Hot R&B/Hip-Hop Singles & Tracks (Billboard)	62
US Hot Rap Singles (Billboard)	1
US Maxi-Singles Sales (Billboard)	38
