= Fight the Power: Greatest Hits Live! =

Live album by Public Enemy
- Released: February 6, 2007
- Genre: Hip hop, East Coast hip hop, hardcore hip hop, political hip hop
- Label: Titan/Pyramid

Public Enemy chronology
Rebirth of a Nation (2006)	Fight the Power: Greatest Hits Live! (2007)	How You Sell Soul to a Soulless People Who Sold Their Soul? (2007)

Fight the Power: Greatest Hits Live! is a live album by Public Enemy.

Professional ratings
Review scores
Source	Rating
Allmusic	link

== Track listing ==
1. "Brothers Gonna Work It Out"
2. "Welcome to the Terrordome"
3. "Bring the Noise"
4. "Son of a Bush"
5. "Shut 'Em Down"
6. "Black Steel in the Hour of Chaos"
7. "He Got Game"
8. "Revolverlution"
9. "911 Is a Joke"
10. "Public Enemy No. 1"
11. "D.J. Lord Solo"
12. "Give It Up"
13. "Don't Believe the Hype"
14. "Rebel Without A Pause"
15. "Arizona (Ball of Confusion)"
16. "Fight the Power (Soul Power)"
