= The Elephant in the Room (album) =

Studio album by Fat Joe
- Released: March 11, 2008
- Recorded: 2007
- Genre: Hip hop
- Length: 42:47
- Label: TS
- Producers: Fat Joe (Executive Producer); Scott Storch; Cool and Dre; Danja; DJ Khaled; DJ Premier; Swizz Beatz; The Alchemist; The Individualz; Streetrunner; The Hitmen (Including LV, Sean C, & Mario Winans)

Fat Joe chronology
Me, Myself & I (2006)	The Elephant in the Room (2008)	Jealous Ones Still Envy 2 (2009)

Singles from The Elephant in the Room
- 1. "I Won't Tell" Released: November 8, 2007; 2. "Ain't Sayin' Nothin'" Released: May 5, 2008

The Elephant in the Room is the eighth studio album by American rapper Fat Joe. The album was released on March 11, 2008, by Terror Squad, Virgin Records, and Imperial Records. Production for the album was done by Scott Storch, Cool and Dre, Danja, DJ Khaled, DJ Premier, Swizz Beatz, The Alchemist, Streetrunner, and The Hitmen, and guest contributions came from artists like Beatz, Plies, Lil Wayne, J. Holiday, and KRS-One.

The album received a generally positive reception but critics felt it was inconsistent in its mixture of production and lyricism. The Elephant in the Room spawned two singles: "I Won't Tell" and "Ain't Sayin' Nothin'". The album debuted at number six on the US Billboard 200, selling 47,000 copies in its first week.

== Critical reception ==
Professional ratings
Review scores
Source	Rating
AllHipHop	3.5/5 stars
AllMusic	3.5/5 stars
Billboard	(favorable)
DJBooth	3.5/5 stars
HipHopDX	3/5 stars
The Phoenix	2.5/4 stars
RapReviews	(5.5/10)
Vibe	(favorable)

The Elephant in the Room garnered positive reviews but music critics were divided by the production and lyrical content. Nathan Slavik of DJBooth praised the album's varied production for allowing Joe to deliver different topics through various regional flows, saying that, "While Joe has never produced a truly classic album, Elephant In The Room proves that his contributions to the game have been significant and long-lasting." AllMusic editor David Jeffries also praised Joe for changing his flow when switching from street tracks to radio singles, despite finding the drug talk monotonous and a lack of cohesion between him and the producers, concluding with, "Still, Joe warns the listener right at the beginning that he's more Eazy-E than Ice Cube -- and for three-fourths of the album, he's spot on." Latifah Muhammad of AllHipHop found a lack of cohesion between Joe and the producers on the record but felt that he managed to deliver tracks both commercially and artistically, saying that it "manages to show off Joes' clever mixture of street anthems and radio shiny tunes."

HipHopDX staff writer Mcooper found a lack of consistency throughout the album, praising some tracks for its mixture of new-school production and lyrics reminiscent of old-school hip-hop but found the rest of it weak and hollow, saying that "Joe has the talent to put out a classic caliber album, but as long as he wants to stay current with the downloads and ringtones, that vision may not come to pass." Ben Westhoff of The Phoenix was mixed about the record, finding the lyrical content generic but felt that Joe added some needed empathy in his material, saying that "What makes it work is his vulnerability, a rare commodity in hip-hop. Unlike associate Rick Ross, who keeps letting you know that he’s the “boss,” Joe just wants to entertain you." Jesal Padania of RapReviews felt that Joe copied the formula from Me, Myself & I for the album, criticizing the production for being mediocre at best and not allowing him to make good use of them, saying that "In other words, can I really recommend you purchasing this album? Not really - and I would class myself as a Fat Joe fan. I will recommend that you purchase a few of the songs from iTunes, but that is the best I can do."

== Commercial performance ==
The Elephant in the Room debuted at number six on the US Billboard 200 chart, selling 47,125 copies in its first week. This became Joe's third US top-ten debut. The album also debuted at number three on the US Top R&B/Hip-Hop Albums chart, becoming Joe's sixth top-ten album on this chart. In its second week, the album dropped to number 56 on the chart. In its third week, the album dropped to number 74 on the chart and left the chart the following week.

== Track listing ==
No.	Title	Writer(s)	Producer(s)	Length
1.	"The Fugitive"	Joseph Cartagena; Nicholas Warwar; Jerry Harris; George Kerr	Streetrunner	3:58
2.	"Ain't Sayin' Nothin'" (featuring Dre and Plies)	Cartagena; Marcello Valenzano; Andre Lyon; Algernod Washington	Cool & Dre	3:38
3.	"The Crackhouse" (featuring Lil Wayne)	Cartagena; Dwayne Carter; Steve Morales; Jesus Bobe; Keithin Pittman; Brett Bouldin; Eugene Dixon; Earl Edwards; Louis Freese; Larry Muggerud; Bernice Williams	Steve Morales	3:33
4.	"Cocababy" (featuring Jackie Rubio)	Cartagena; Nate Hills	Danja	3:26
5.	"Get It for Life" (featuring Poo Bear)	Cartagena; Khaled Khaled; Jason Boyd	DJ Khaled	3:28
6.	"Drop" (featuring Swizz Beatz and Jackie Rubio)	Cartagena; Kasseem Dean	Swizz Beatz	3:00
7.	"I Won't Tell" (featuring J. Holiday)	Cartagena; Levar Coppin; Mario Winans; Delano Matthews	LV; Sean C; Mario Winans	3:47
8.	"K.A.R. (Kill All Rats)"	Cartagena; Warwar; Robert Miller; Marlena Shaw; Richard Evans	Streetrunner	4:00
9.	"300 Brolic" (featuring Opera Steve)	Cartagena; Coppin; Matthews	LV; Sean C	3:11
10.	"Preacher on a Sunday Morning" (featuring Poo Bear)	Cartagena; Scott Storch; Boyd	Scott Storch	3:28
11.	"My Conscience" (featuring KRS-One)	Cartagena; Alan Maman; Lawrence Parker	The Alchemist	4:11
12.	"That White"	Cartagena; Christopher Edward Martin; Bob Crewe; Kenny Nolan	DJ Premier	3:12

iTunes bonus track
No.	Title	Producer(s)	Length
12.	"Whatchuu Got" (featuring Rick Ross and Oz Fox)	The Runners	4:20

== Personnel ==
Credits for The Elephant in the Room adapted from AllMusic.

- Angelo Aponte – engineer, vocal engineer
- Marcella Araica – vocal engineer, vocal producer
- Jesus Bobe – programming
- Flex Cabrera – management
- Brian "Big Bass" Gardner – mastering
- Ed "Wolverine" Goldstein – bass
- Jayne Grodd – administration
- Infamous – keyboards
- Derrick Jenner – assistant engineer
- Chad Jolley – mixing assistant
- Jeff "Gemcrates" Ladd – engineer
- Ed Lidow – assistant engineer, mixing assistant
- Jonathan Mannion – photography
- Fabian Marasciullo – mixing
- Raul Pena – engineer
- Kiethen Pittman – keyboards
- Adrian "Drop" Sanpalla – vocal engineer, vocal producer
- Brian Springer – vocal engineer
- Javier Valverde – engineer, vocal engineer, vocal producer
- Danny Zook – sample clearance

== Charts ==
=== Weekly charts ===
Chart (2008)	Peak position
US Billboard 200	6
US Top R&B/Hip-Hop Albums (Billboard)	3

=== Year-end charts ===
Chart (2008)	Position
US Top R&B/Hip-Hop Albums (Billboard)	79
