= Me, Myself & I (album) =

Studio album by Fat Joe
- Released: November 14, 2006
- Studio: Panic Room Studios (Miami, FL); Circle House Studios (Miami, FL); Record One (Sherman Oaks, CA); Hit Factory Studios (Miami, FL)
- Genre: Hip-hop
- Length: 49:53
- Label: TS
- Producer: DJ Khaled; Grind Music; Nu Jerzey Devil; Scott Storch; Streetrunner; The Runners

Fat Joe chronology
All or Nothing (2005)	Me, Myself & I (2006)	The Elephant in the Room (2008)

Singles from Me, Myself & I
- 1. "Make It Rain" Released: October 31, 2006

Me, Myself & I is the seventh solo studio album by American rapper Fat Joe. It was released on November 14, 2006, through Terror Squad Entertainment. Recording sessions took place at Panic Room Studios, Circle House Studios and Hit Factory Studios in Miami and at Record One in Sherman Oaks. Produced by Grind Music, StreetRunner, DJ Khaled, Scott Storch, Nu Jerzey Devil and The Runners, it features guest appearances from Lil Wayne, H-Mob and The Game.

In the United States, the album debuted at number 14 on the Billboard 200, number 3 on the Top R&B/Hip-Hop Albums and number 2 on the Top Rap Albums charts, selling 60,000 units in its first week. It was supported by the single "Make It Rain", which peaked at number 13 on the US Billboard Hot 100 chart. As of September 2007, the album has sold a total of 206,000 copies in the United States.

== Critical reception ==
Professional ratings
Review scores
Source	Rating
AllMusic	3.5/5 stars
Entertainment Weekly	C
HipHopDX	3/5
Los Angeles Times	3/4 stars
Now	2/5 Ns
RapReviews	6.5/10
Stylus	C−
USA Today	3/4 stars

Me, Myself & I received mixed reviews from music critics who found it to be of less quality compared to All or Nothing. AllMusic's David Jeffries praised the album for toning down on featured artists to focus more on Joe's deep street lyricism backed by ear-grabbing production, concluding that "hearing this high-profile thug so boldly reclaiming his street cred without any concessions is exciting and makes it easy to shrug off this driven full-length's one-track mind". Soren Baker of the Los Angeles Times praised the album for balancing out the street bangers with contemplative tracks like "Bendicion Mami" and "Story to Tell", saying that it makes "Joe's latest a well-rounded affair". Andrew Kameka of HipHopDX found some of the lyrical content wearing thin but praised Joe for sticking with his gut of performing gruff street tracks with aggressive production, saying that "Fat Joe doesn't hold his weight on a few of the album's songs, but he delivers enough strength to silence anyone who questions his place in Hip Hop.

Steve 'Flash' Juon of RapReviews found the lyrical content to be samey because of Joe's lack of energy and that they were more suited for Rick Ross and Pitbull, concluding with, "That personality is completely absent from Me, Myself & I, which may make this the most ironically titled album of his career". Jody Rosen of Entertainment Weekly said that despite two Lil Wayne collaborations, the album suffers from generic brag raps and southern production that are more slave to trends than imaginative, concluding with, "If only Joe’s CD had less of he, himself, and him". Evan McGarvey of Stylus Magazine criticized the album for showcasing Joe's worst tendencies of borrowing regional hip hop beats and delivering sex and street lyrics that sound more humorous, concluding with "Don’t buy it. He'll be back next year saying the same thing, synth-de-jour in tow".

== Track listing ==
No.	Title	Writer(s)	Producer(s)	Length
1.	"Pendemic"	Joseph Cartagena; Nicholas Warwar	Streetrunner	3:25
2.	"Damn"	Cartagena; Levar Coppin	Grind Music	3:50
3.	"The Profit" (featuring Lil' Wayne)	Cartagena; Dwayne Carter; Khaled Khaled	DJ Khaled	5:07
4.	"No Drama (Clap & Revolve)"	Cartagena; Andrew Harr; Jermaine Jackson	The Runners	3:58
5.	"Breathe and Stop" (featuring The Game)	Cartagena; Jayceon Taylor; Anthony Torres	Nu Jerzey Devil	3:44
6.	"She's My Mama" (featuring H-Mob)	Cartagena; Harold Easterling; Warwar	Streetrunner	4:23
7.	"Make It Rain" (featuring Lil' Wayne)	Cartagena; Carter; Scott Storch	Scott Storch	4:07
8.	"Jealousy"	Cartagena; Coppin	Grind Music	4:55
9.	"Think About It"	Cartagena; Storch	Scott Storch	3:31
10.	"Hard Not 2 Kill"	Cartagena; Coppin	Grind Music	2:55
11.	"Bendicion Mami"	Cartagena; Warwar	Streetrunner	4:41
12.	"Story to Tell"	Cartagena; Khaled	DJ Khaled	5:17
Total length:				49:53

Sample credits

- Track 2 contains excerpts from "Excursion With Complications" written and performed by Bo Hansson.
- Track 5 contains sampled portions from "War" written by Allan Cole and Carlton Barrett and performed by Bob Marley and the Wailers.
- Track 6 features samples from "Keep On Runnin'" written by Lee Goldsmith, Ray Thompson and Jimmy Douglass and performed by Black Heat.
- Track 8 contains samples from "Ike's Mood" written and performed by Isaac Hayes.
- Track 10 contains samples of "Jan" written by Marvin Gaye and performed by The Intruders.
- Track 11 contains elements from "Maria (You Were The Only One)" written by Lawrence Brown, Horgay Gordy, Allen Story and Linda Glover and performed by Michael Jackson.

== Charts ==
=== Weekly charts ===
Chart (2006)	Peak position
US Billboard 200	14
US Top R&B/Hip-Hop Albums (Billboard)	3
US Top Rap Albums (Billboard)	2

=== Year-end charts ===
Chart (2007)	Position
US Top R&B/Hip-Hop Albums (Billboard)	74
