= I Won't Tell =

Single by Fat Joe featuring J. Holiday

from the album The Elephant in the Room
- Released: November 8, 2007
- Recorded: 2007
- Genre: Hip hop, R&B
- Length: 3:47
- Label: Terror Squad/Imperial/Virgin
- Songwriters: Deric Angelettie, Joseph Cartagena, Levar Coppin, Nahum Thorton Grymes, Delano Matthews, Mario Winans
- Producer: The Hitmen

Fat Joe singles chronology
"We Takin' Over" (2007)	"I Won't Tell" (2007)	"Ain't Sayin' Nothin'" (2008)

J. Holiday singles chronology
"Suffocate" (2007)	"I Won't Tell" (2007)	"It's Yours" (2009)

"I Won't Tell" is a song by American rapper Fat Joe. It was released as the first single of his eight album The Elephant in the Room (2008), and features R&B singer J. Holiday. It was released on November 8, 2007 on Fat Joe's MySpace page. It was released through iTunes on December 4, 2007. It is a hip hop and contemporary R&B song.

The song received a mixed reception from critics. The single peaked at number 37 on the US Billboard Hot 100. The accompanying music video for the single was directed by Gil Green.

== Critical reception ==
"I Won't Tell" received mixed reviews from music critics. Reviewing the album, David Jeffries of AllMusic praised the song for being one of the album's better radio singles that bring "sweet relief." Jesal Padania of RapReviews found the lyrics middling but praised J. Holiday's appearance and The Hitmen's production for being soothing. HipHopDX staff writer Mcooper criticized the song along with "You Ain't Sayin Nothin'" for targeting mainstream radio, saying that, "These songs find Joe short on creativity, but eager for radio spins."

== Chart performance ==
"I Won't Tell" peaked at number 37 on the US Billboard Hot 100, giving Joe his fifth top 40 hit on the chart. The song also peaked at numbers three and 12 on the US Hot Rap Songs and US Hot R&B/Hip-Hop Songs charts respectively.

== Music video ==
The music video for "I Won't Tell" (directed by Gil Green) was released on December 18, 2007 on Fat Joe's MySpace video page. Cameo appearances include Bow Wow, LL Cool J, Diddy, Christina Milian, LeToya Luckett, Junior Reid, Mario Winans, Pitbull, Scott Storch, Flo Rida, E-Class (Poe Boy Entertainment Manager), Akon, DJ Khaled, Slim Thug, Sheek Louch, Dre, and Brisco.

== Charts ==
=== Weekly charts ===
Chart (2008)	Peak position
US Billboard Hot 100	37
US Hot R&B/Hip-Hop Songs (Billboard)	12
US Hot Rap Songs (Billboard)	3
US Rhythmic Airplay (Billboard)	18
US Pop 100 (Billboard)	68

=== Year-end charts ===
Chart (2008)	Position
US Hot R&B/Hip-Hop Songs (Billboard)	51

== Release history ==
Release dates and formats for "I Won't Tell"
Region	Date	Format	Label(s)	Ref.
United States	February 11, 2008	Mainstream airplay	Capitol	
