= Relativity Urban Assault =

Compilation album by Various artists
- Released: September 10, 1996
- Recorded: January – July 1996
- Genre: Hardcore hip hop, East Coast hip hop, West Coast hip hop, Midwest hip hop
- Length: 54:52
- Label: Relativity
- Producer: Big Jaz, The Beatnuts, Pete Rock, No I.D., Showbiz, DJ Honda, Cold 187um, Julio G, Tony G, Lev Berlak, Chris Hicks, 8-Off, Born Lords, Frankie Cutlass, Bishop "Stick" Burrell

Professional ratings
Review scores
Source	Rating
Allmusic	2/5 stars

Relativity Urban Assault is a compilation album released by Relativity Records on September 10, 1996. The album's best known song is Common's "The Bitch in Yoo", which is a diss song aimed at rapper, Ice Cube and his group Westside Connection.

== Track listing ==
1. "World Famous"- 4:01 (M.O.P.)
2. "Find That" (The Beatnuts)
3. "The Bitch in Yoo" (Common)
4. "Firewater"- 4:14 (Fat Joe)
5. "The Real Weight"- 3:36 (No I.D.)
6. "Rugged-N-Raw"- 3:34 (PMD)
7. "Games People Play"- 4:24 (Frankie Cutlass)
8. "Out for the Cash"- 3:49 (DJ Honda, The Beatnuts & Fat Joe)
9. "Blood Bath"- 4:25 (The Dayton Family)
10. "Choppin' It Up"- 3:04 (Dru Down)
11. "Opening Doors"- 4:40 (Mac Mall, Cold 187um & Kokane)
12. "Baby I Love You"- 6:12 (H-Town)
13. "La Raza II"- 5:13 (Frost)
