= Fat Joe =

American rapper (born 1970)

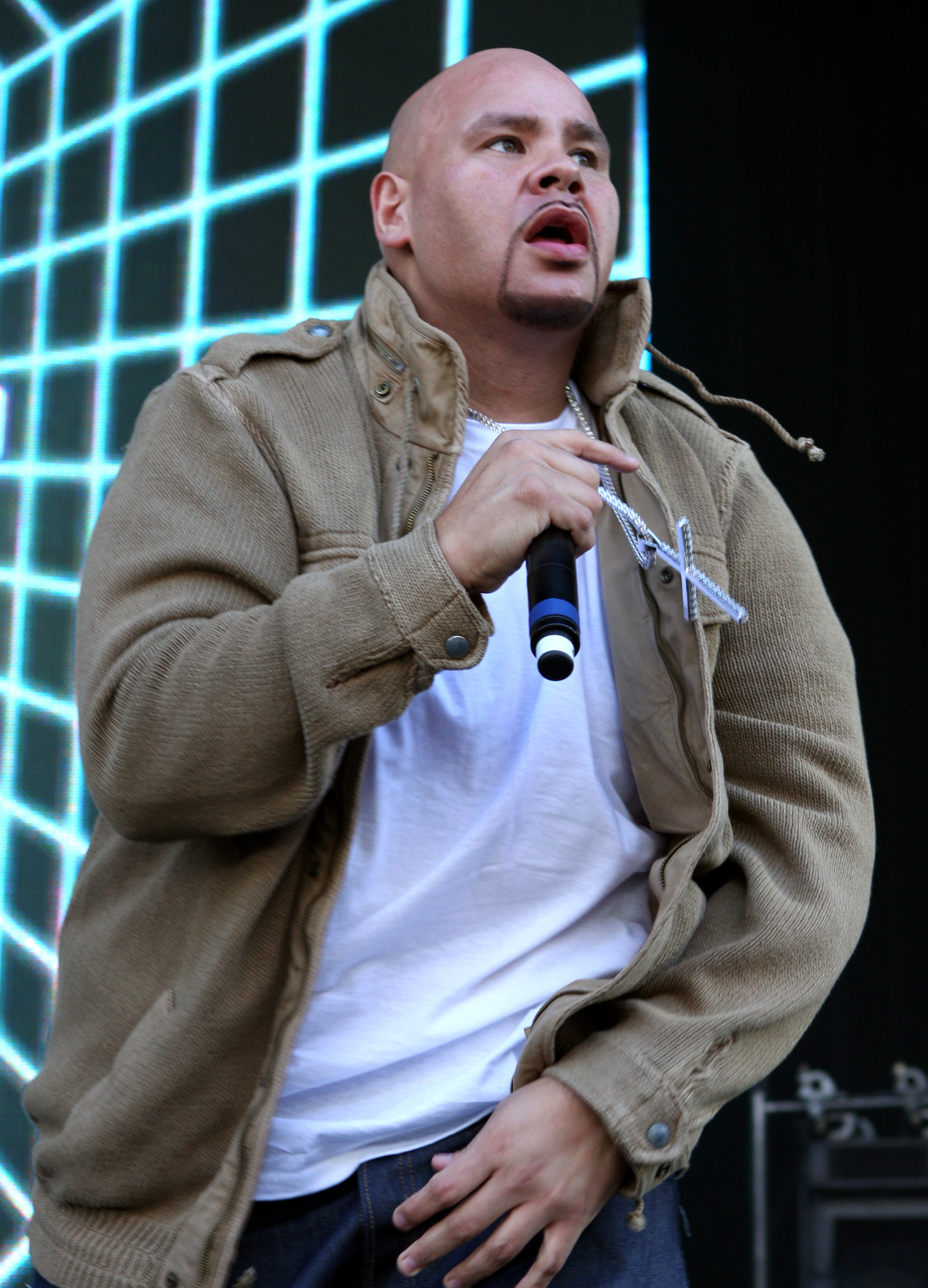
- Fat Joe in 2011

Background information
- Also known as: Fat Joe da Gangsta; Joey Crack
- Born: Joseph Antonio Cartagena; August 19, 1970 (age 56); New York City, U.S.
- Genres: East Coast hip-hop; gangsta rap; hardcore hip-hop
- Occupations: Rapper; songwriter; actor; record executive
- Works: Fat Joe discography
- Years active: 1991–present
- Labels: EMPIRE; R.N.G.; R4 So Valid; E1; Mr. 305 Inc.; Warner Bros.; Imperial; Terror Squad; Virgin; Atlantic (former); Big Beat (former); Mystic (former); Violator; Relativity
- Formerly of: Diggin' in the Crates Crew (D.I.T.C.); Terror Squad
- Spouse: Lorena Cartagena (m. 1995)
- Children: 3

Signature
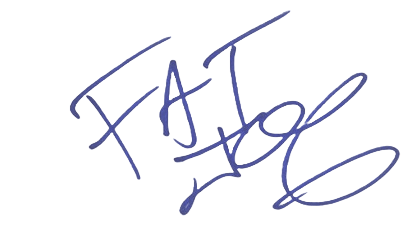

Joseph Antonio Cartagena (born August 19, 1970), better known by his stage name Fat Joe, is an American rapper. He began recording as a member of hip hop group Diggin' in the Crates Crew (D.I.T.C.) in 1991, and pursued a solo career with the release of his debut studio album, Represent (1993) the following year. Cartagena formed the hip hop group Terror Squad and its namesake record label in the late 1990s, through which he has signed fellow New York artists including Big Pun, Remy Ma, Tony Sunshine, Cuban Link, Triple Seis, as well as then-unknown producers DJ Khaled and Cool & Dre.

Represent was preceded by his debut single "Flow Joe", which entered the Billboard Hot 100 and peaked atop the Hot Rap Songs chart. The album was followed by Jealous One's Envy (1995), Don Cartagena (1998), and Jealous Ones Still Envy (J.O.S.E.) (2001)—the latter received platinum certification from the Recording Industry Association of America (RIAA) and yielded the hit single, "What's Luv?" (featuring Ja Rule and Ashanti). The song peaked at number two on the Billboard Hot 100, while his 2004 single "Lean Back" (with Terror Squad) peaked atop the chart and remains his most commercially successful release. Cartagena has also released the top 40 singles "Make It Rain" (featuring Lil Wayne) in 2006, and "All the Way Up" (with Remy Ma featuring French Montana and Infared) a decade later.

Cartagena has appeared in several films, including Scary Movie 3 and Happy Feet, as well as Spike Lee's Netflix series She's Gotta Have It.

== Early life ==
Joseph Antonio Cartagena was born on August 19, 1970 to a Cuban father and a Puerto Rican mother, in the Bronx, New York City, where he was raised. Living in the Forest Houses, a public housing project in the Morrisania neighborhood, Cartagena began stealing at a young age to support his family. He also admits that he was a bully in his childhood. His older brother, Angel (died 2024), introduced him to hip hop music. At the time, Cartagena had been kicked out of his family's apartment following a fight with his father and began dealing drugs.

== Music career ==
=== 1992–1995: Early years, Represent and Jealous One's Envy ===
Cartagena began performing music under the alias, Fat Joe da Gangsta, and became part of the rap group D.I.T.C., formed by producer Diamond D. After performing at the Apollo Theater's Amateur Night even in 1991, Cartagena was represented by music executive Chris Lighty of Violator and then, signed to Relativity Records in the early 1990s, recording material for his debut studio album and working with many artists whom he would later sign to his own label.

On July 27, 1993, his debut album Represent was released, featuring production from The Beatnuts, Diamond D, Lord Finesse, and others. Its lead single, "Flow Joe", peaked at number one on the Billboard Hot Rap Singles chart. Other singles from the album included "Watch the Sound" and "This Shit Is Real".

On October 24, 1995, Cartagena released his second studio album, Jealous One's Envy, which peaked at number 71 on the Billboard 200 and at number seven on the Top R&B/Hip Hop Albums chart. The album featured a guest appearance from KRS-One and production from Diamond D. The lead single was "Success", which failed to chart. His second single, "Envy" peaked at number eight on the Hot Rap Tracks chart.

One day while writing for the album at Chung King Studios, Cartagena happened to find that his rap idol and friend, LL Cool J, was in another room with Poke and Tone, known together as the production duo, the Trackmasters. They were working on the remix version of LL's single, "I Shot Ya". After being welcomed to contribute a verse, Cartagena appeared on the remix, along with Foxy Brown, Keith Murray, and Prodigy of Mobb Deep. The track is considered by Cartagena to be one of his career highlights. A video, directed by Hype Williams, was shot for the remix.

During the recording of Jealous One's Envy, Cartagena discovered fellow Latino rapper and New Yorker Big Pun, who was later featured on the song, "Watch Out". Cartagena later explained the rapper's influence on him: "Latinos before us who had the opportunity to do it just didn't know how to do it. They came in trying to do this black music, waving flags. [But] we're trying to kick in the doors for other Latinos and represent our people, and it shows."

=== 1996–1999: Signing with Atlantic, Don Cartagena and Terror Squad ===
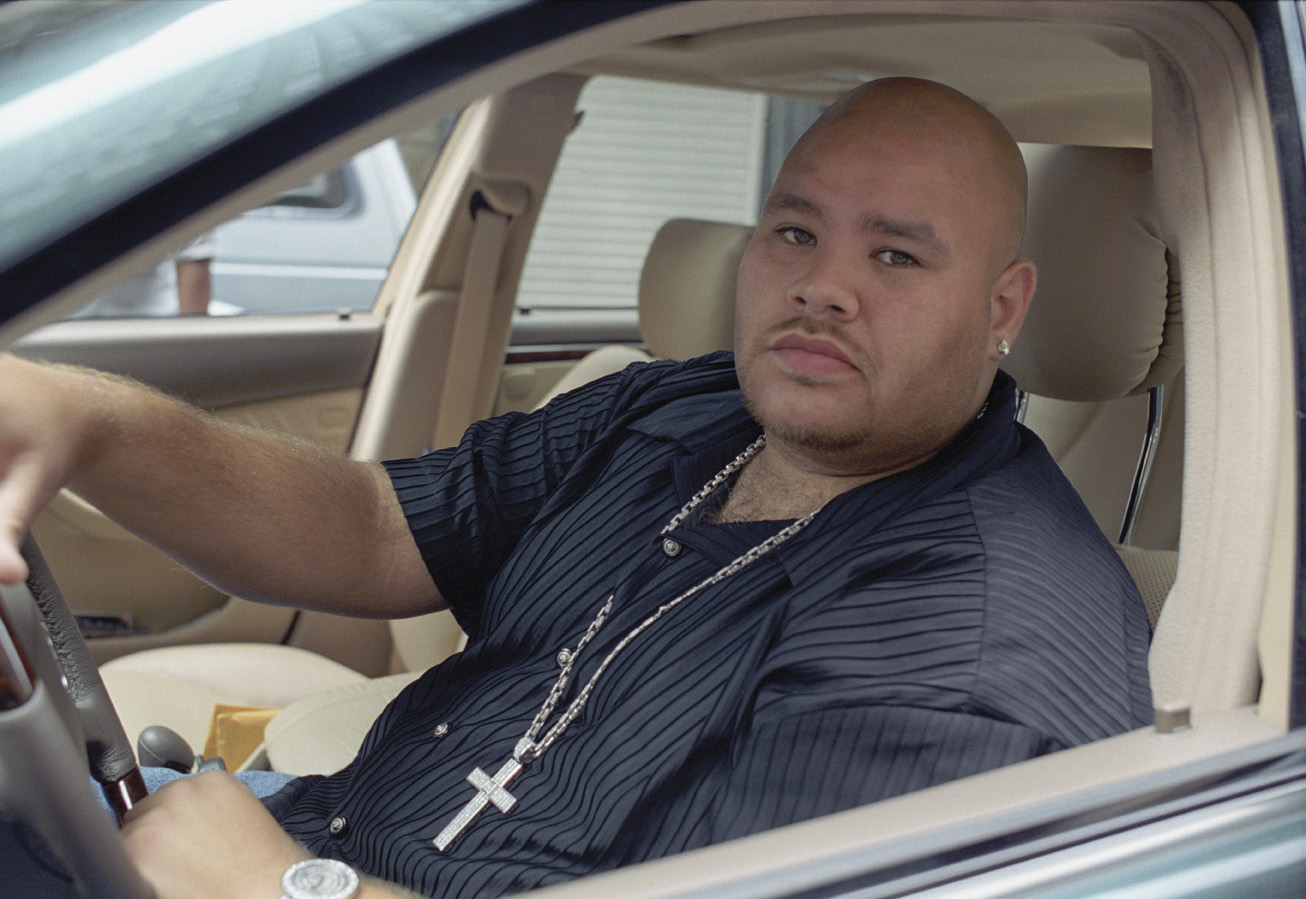
Fat Joe in 1999

In 1996, Cartagena left Relativity, after discovering that the label had underpromoted him. However, he is still featured on the label's compilation, Relativity Urban Assault on the track, "Firewater".

In 1997, Cartagena attempted to sign with Sean "Diddy" Combs' imprint, Bad Boy Records, but later signed with Atlantic Records after the label offered him his own music label, Terror Squad Entertainment. Combs blessed Cartagena to join Atlantic after he denied him permission to launch Terror Squad under Bad Boy. Rapper Eminem sent Cartagena a demo for him to join his Terror Squad imprint under Atlantic, but Cartagena rejected it six times. He executive produced and also was featured on Big Pun's 1998 debut album, Capital Punishment.

He subsequently began recording his third studio album, Don Cartagena, which was released on September 1, 1998. His first under Terror Squad and Atlantic through a joint venture with Mystic Entertainment Group and Atlantic's Big Beat Records, it debuted on the Billboard 200 at number seven and number two on the Top R&B/Hip-Hop Albums chart (it was prevented from topping the latter chart by The Miseducation of Lauryn Hill), eventually being certified gold by the RIAA (Recording Industry Association of America) a month after its release for shipping 500,000 copies in the United States. The album featured three singles with accompanying music videos, "Bet Ya Man Can't Triz", "John Blaze", and "Don Cartagena". Guest appearances included Nas, Puff Daddy, Big Pun, Raekwon, Jadakiss, and Bone Thugs-N-Harmony members Krayzie Bone and Layzie Bone. On Don Cartagena, he debuted his own group, Terror Squad (1998-2006), consisting of Big Pun, Cuban Link, Triple Seis, Prospect, Armageddon, Tony Sunshine and later, Remy Ma. Triple Seis claimed that he and Pun were ghostwriters for Don Cartagena, and asserts that Cartagena continues to hire ghostwriters.

In 1999, he and Big Pun appeared on Jennifer Lopez's single, "Feelin' So Good", from her album, On the 6. Also that year, Terror Squad released a compilation album, Terror Squad: The Album. The compilation sold below commercial expectations.

=== 2000–2005: Personal crisis, continued music career and "Lean Back" ===
In 2000, Cartagena's friend and Terror Squad artist Big Pun died that February of a heart attack. That same year, he lost his older sister and grandfather. The aftermath of his family and Big Pun's deaths sent Cartagena into a clinical depression. He began drinking heavily to cope with the pain. Around the same time, Triple Seis left Terror Squad and Cuban Link have parted ways with Cartagena's Terror Squad imprint due to internal conflicts with him and Atlantic Records. Cartagena began seeking therapy for his depression issues with the help of his wife, Lorena.

Cartagena then released his fourth studio album, Jealous Ones Still Envy (J.O.S.E.), on December 4, 2001. A sequel to his 1995 album, Jealous One's Envy, the album featured guest appearances by Ashanti, Ja Rule, N.O.R.E., Busta Rhymes, Petey Pablo, M.O.P., Ludacris, R. Kelly, Buju Banton, and various artists from his Terror Squad label. The lead single, "We Thuggin'", featuring R. Kelly was a hit single, but would not reach the superior level of its follow-up single, the Irv Gotti-produced song, "What's Luv?", featuring Ja Rule and Ashanti, which was released in early 2002. "What's Luv?" would chart at number two on the Billboard Hot 100, becoming Cartagena's second biggest commercial hit single in his career. It was also included on the soundtrack to the 2002 dramedy film, Juwanna Mann. At the time of the album's release, Cartagena's management transition to the Squad Music, a management wing of Terror Squad Entertainment after parting ways with Mick Bentson and Chris Lighty's Violator company. Jealous Ones Still Envy is Cartagena's biggest selling album in his career to date, having been certified platinum by the RIAA in May 2002 for the shipment over a million copies. During this period, Cartagena's wife, Lorena, became his stylist for the time being, also being credited for half-dressing her husband in a sleeveless jacket with his chest being nearly shown to the crowd while performing "What's Luv?" at MTV's annual Spring Break concert in 2002.

However, despite the continuing success of "What's Luv?", his fifth studio album, Loyalty, released on November 12, 2002, was not as successful as Jealous Ones Still Envy. It debuted at number 31 on the Billboard 200. Its first single, "Crush Tonight" featuring Ginuwine, was also a commercial disappointment, peaking at number 77 on the Billboard Hot 100. Cartagena later appeared on Lil Jon and the Eastside Boyz's single, "Play No Games", alongside Oobie and Trick Daddy. Tony Sunshine filled in for Ginuwine as the chorus performer for "Crush Tonight" when he and Cartagena performed the song on a 2003 episode of the Comedy Central program Chappelle's Show. Also in 2003, he was featured in the pop single "I Want You" by Mexican singer Thalía.

Throughout October 2003 and April 2004, Cartagena reunited with his group Terror Squad to record a second compilation album. He also setup a studio session with record producer Scott Storch, which would end up producing the song, "Lean Back". He began singing a melody for the beat to Storch, who later materialized the production. Originally a Fat Joe solo track for the Terror Squad compilation, Remy Ma overheard the session and demanded that she appear on the second verse of the track upon recording it. Jason Birchmeier of AllMusic called the song "a perfect club-ready duet between Joe and Remy Ma that boasts a trademark Scott Storch beat and a memorable singalong hook and dance-along step". "Lean Back" debuted at number one on the Billboard Hot 100 for three weeks before being ousted from the top position by singer Ciara's single, "Goodies". It was also certified gold by the RIAA in January 2005. However, the Terror Squad compilation, True Story, released on July 7, 2004, did not fare well commercially. It sold 90,000 units in its first week, though it was a commercial success on Billboard, debuting at number seven on the Billboard 200 and number one on the Top R&B/Hip-Hop Albums chart respectively.

He then began recording material for Ivy Queen's debut English-language album, Real, in support of her goal to compete in the world of English-language hip hop music. Cartagena portrayed himself and provided his own voice and likeness for the September 2004 video game, Def Jam: Fight For NY. The video game also featured Cartagena's 2002 song "Take A Look At My Life" from Loyalty.

That November, Cartagena appeared on Ja Rule's single, "New York", alongside rapper and the Lox member, Jadakiss. This was what provoked a feud between Cartagena, Jadakiss and 50 Cent, due to 50's disapproval of the former two appearing on a Ja Rule song, and the fact that 50 Cent himself had a violent feud with the rapper since 1999. Cartagena dissed 50 Cent on the track, "My Fofo", which later appeared on his sixth studio album, All or Nothing, which was released on June 14, 2005. Despite the inclusion of "My Fofo", All or Nothing spawned the singles, "So Much More" and "Get It Poppin" featuring Nelly, also with guest appearances from Eminem, Mase, Remy Ma, Mashonda (the ex-wife of producer Swizz Beatz), and R. Kelly; the album also included a remix of "Lean Back" as a bonus track. Despite favorable reviews from critics, the album was yet another commercial failure for Cartagena, debuting at number six on the Billboard 200, with 106,000 copies sold in its first week, the lowest first-week sales for a Fat Joe album and the lowest-selling studio album in Cartagena's music career.

=== 2006–2008: Departure from Atlantic Records, seventh and eighth studio albums ===
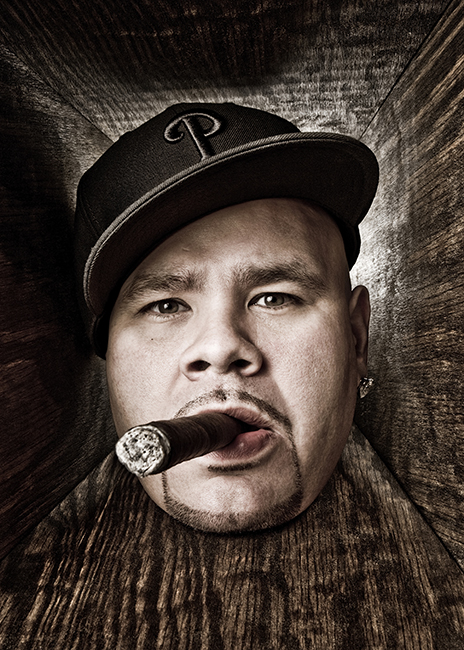
Fat Joe in 2008

In 2006, with the disappointment of the commercial and critical reception of All or Nothing, Cartagena parted ways with Atlantic Records and bought back the rights and trademark to his Terror Squad imprint. In 2024, Cartagena repaid eighteen-year advances back to Atlantic and its parent company, Warner Music Group, after which he called the major music label industry a "Ponzi scheme". As of April 2018, his music catalog for Atlantic Records is no longer under ownership of Warner Music Group, being divested in 2017 to RT Industries, a company founded by Razor & Tie founders. However, Warner Music retains the digital distribution rights, now under its ADA division. This divestment was required as effect of a deal with IMPALA and the Merlin Network, related to Warner Music's acquisition of Parlophone Records from the now-defunct EMI.

In early 2006, Cartagena hired Troy Carter as his new manager for his seventh studio album. He then appeared in a freestyle cipher segment for VH1's "Freestyle 59" competition in October 2006, prior to the VH1 Hip Hop Honors featuring New Jersey rapper Neuse. Cartagena also featured on N.O.R.E.'s single, "Mas Maiz", which appeared on the latter's first Spanish-language album, N.O.R.E. y la Familia...Ya Tú Sabe.

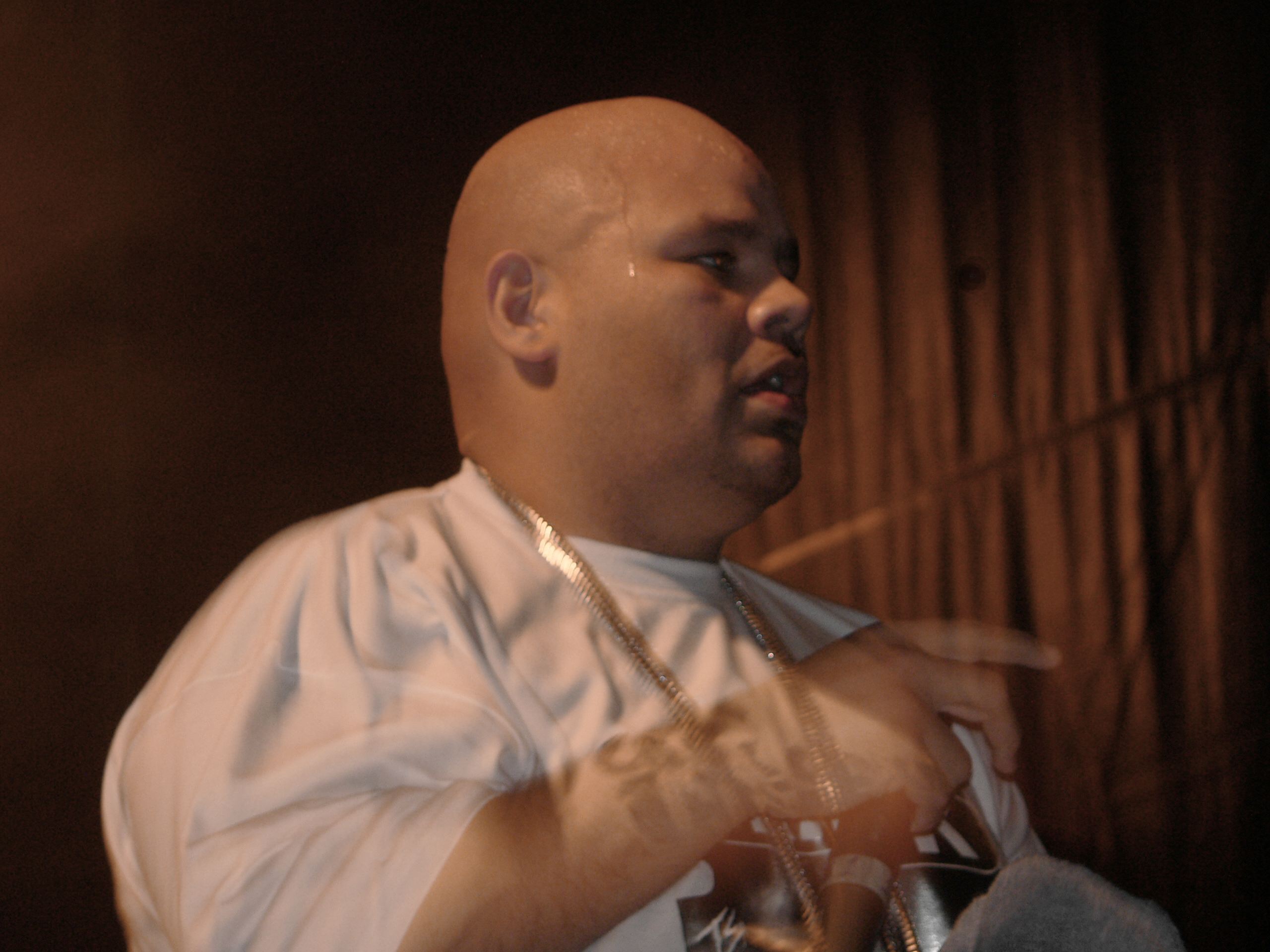
Fat Joe performing in Portugal in 2006

Me, Myself & I, released on November 14, 2006, is Cartagena's seventh studio album. It was also his first album, released under his new deal with Imperial Records, a division of Caroline Records, itself a subsidiary of the independent division of Virgin Records (now Virgin Music Group). It featured the hit single "Make It Rain" featuring rapper Lil Wayne, followed by "No Drama (Clap and Revolve)". "Make It Rain", however, made a dominant placement in the new era of New York City's hip-hop scene, which was overshadowed by the birth of Atlanta-based trap music, which the song's production was based on. The song peaked at number thirteen on the Billboard Hot 100, went platinum (also in mastertone form) for selling a million copies the following year and in 2008, was nominated for a Grammy Award for Best Rap Performance by a Duo or Group.

The day of his seventh album's release, photos circulated online when he appeared on MTV's Total Request Live alongside rapper the Game, who coincidentally released his sophomore studio album, Doctor's Advocate, the same day. Both rappers bought copies of their albums together at a Virgin Megastores in New York City's Times Square. The budding friendship between Cartagena and the Game also infuriated their longtime rival, 50 Cent.

In June 2007, Catholic priest Michael Pfleger targeted Cartagena as among several rappers he believed promoted misogyny in his billboard campaign, "Stop Listening to Trash", which was launched on June 18, throughout Chicago, where Pfleger preached. Also that month, Cartagena was featured on DJ Khaled's single, "We Takin' Over", alongside Akon, T.I., Rick Ross, Birdman, and Lil Wayne and the remix to Khaled's "I'm So Hood" with Lil Wayne, Young Jeezy, Rick Ross, Busta Rhymes, Big Boi, Ludacris, and Birdman. At the end of January 2008, Cartagena and his longtime accountant, Brian Dittrich, both denied rumors spreading on the internet that the rapper owed the IRS taxes; Cartagena was later convicted of federal tax charges in 2013.

Cartagena's eighth solo studio album, The Elephant in the Room, and released on March 11, 2008; its lead single was "I Won't Tell" featuring singer J. Holiday. The album debuted at the number six on the Billboard 200 with 47,000 copies sold in its first week. "Ain't Sayin' Nuthin'", featuring Plies, followed.

=== 2009–2011: Jealous Ones Still Envy 2, new record deal, guest appearances and non-album singles ===
Cartagena's ninth solo studio album, J.O.S.E. 2, was released on October 6, 2009, and sold 11,000 copies in its first week. It debuted on the Billboard 200 at number 73. The project reprises the title of Cartagena's respective second and fourth studio albums, Jealous One's Envy (1995) and Jealous Ones Still Envy (J.O.S.E.) (2001), and marked his third release since bringing his Terror Squad imprint to the Caroline/EMI family in 2006. The album featured guest appearances by Ron Browz, Fabolous, Lil' Kim, T-Pain, Lil Wayne, and Akon. Producers include Jim Jonsin, The Inkredibles, and frequent collaborator StreetRunner. "One", featuring Akon, was the first single, with "Aloha" featuring Pleasure P and Rico Love following up.

In January 2010, Cartagena announced that he was working on his tenth studio album, The Darkside Vol. 1. MTV News reported that he intended "all the material to be much harsher" than his previous albums. On March 28, 2010, Cartagena signed a record deal with E1 Music (now MNRK Music Group). On that label, he reunited with music executives Alan Grunblatt and Steve Lobel, who previously worked with Cartagena while he was signed to Relativity Records. The album was released on July 27, 2010, and sold approximately 12,000 copies in the first week and entered the Billboard 200 at number 27. Production comes from The Alchemist, Cool & Dre, Streetrunner, DJ Premier, Scoop DeVille, Just Blaze, Scram Jones, Raw Uncut and DJ Infamous with guest appearances by Busta Rhymes, Trey Songz, Lil Wayne, R. Kelly, Clipse, Cam'ron, Rico Love, Too $hort, TA, and Young Jeezy. The first single from The Darkside Vol. 1 is "(Ha Ha) Slow Down", which features Young Jeezy and contains a sample of Soul II Soul's "Back to Life". It was followed up by its second single, "If It Ain't About Money", which features Trey Songz.

On April 7, 2011, Jamie Drastik released his second mixtape, Champagne and Cocaine, which included the song "One Hundred and Ten", featuring Cartagena. Cartagena was also featured on the remix to DJ Khaled's song "Welcome to My Hood", which also features Ludacris, T-Pain, Busta Rhymes, Twista, Mavado, Birdman, Ace Hood, the Game, Jadakiss, Bun B, and Waka Flocka Flame. It is included as the final track on Khaled's fifth studio album We the Best Forever.

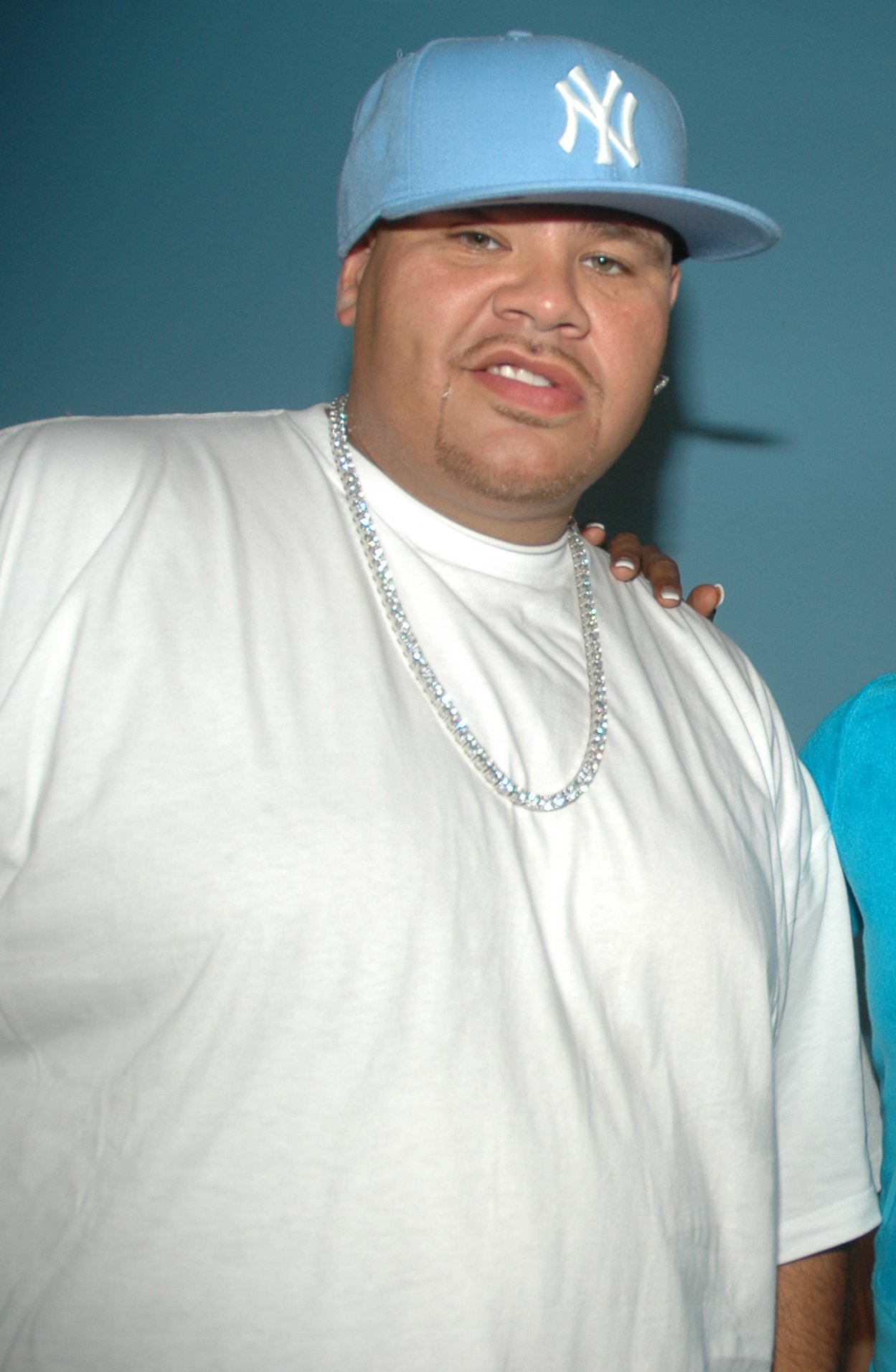
Fat Joe in July 2005

In an interview with XXL Magazine on September 21, 2011, Cartagena stated the Darkside Vol. 2 would be his "first ever official mixtape" and would feature the Mark Henry-produced songs "Massacre on Madison" and "Drop a Body", both of which were released earlier in the year. He confirmed to have started working on his eleventh studio album. Ultimately, the Darkside, Vol. 2 was released on Halloween 2011 (October 31). Only "Drop a Body" was included on the mixtape. On October 19, 2011, a non-album single by Cartagena, "Another Round", was released on iTunes. The single, produced by Cool and Dre and Young Lad, features R&B singer Chris Brown.

=== 2012–2016: Continued non-album singles and "All the Way Up" ===
In August 2012, Cartagena continued another non-album single titled "Pride N Joy". Controversial musician Kanye West had Cartagena re-record his verses "300 times" causing the single's release to see a delay until its release. In September 2012, He was featured on Grammy Award winner Alejandro Sanz's album, La Música No Se Toca, on a track called "Down". A month later, he performed with LL Cool J, former rival 50 Cent, Q-Tip, Busta Rhymes and Missy Elliott as part of a BET Hip Hop Awards tribute to their manager, Chris Lighty, who took his life on August 30 that year.

On November 4, 2012, his third non-album single, "Yellow Tape" which features Lil Wayne, ASAP Rocky, and French Montana, was released. Cartagena would then release another single, "Ballin'" on March 18, 2013. The song features Wiz Khalifa and Teyana Taylor. His music career was put on hiatus after he was sentenced to federal prison for four months following his conviction for tax evasion that year. His mixtape, The Darkside III, was released the day he began his prison sentence.

In March 2016, Cartagena reunited with Remy Ma to release their collaborative single, "All the Way Up", featuring Infared and French Montana. The single peaked at number 27 on the Billboard Hot 100, becoming his first top 40 hit in nearly a decade. "All the Way Up" also spawned four remixes with Jay-Z, Snoop Dogg, the Game, E-40, David Guetta, Glowinthedark, Jay Park, AK-69, Daboyway, SonaOne and Joe Flizzow of rap duo Too Phat, respectively. In February 2021, the song was certified double platinum by the RIAA for sales and streams of over two million single-equivalent units.

=== 2016–2020: Reunion with D.I.T.C., Plata O Plomo, Family Ties and other ventures ===
Cartagena reunited with his former group, D.I.T.C., for their album, Sessions. The album, released in October 2016, was preceded by the lead single, "Rock Shyt". He also revealed that he and Remy Ma were working on a collaborative album, Plata O Plomo, which was released on February 17, 2017 under Empire Distribution and RNG, a label launched by Cartagena and Andre "Dre" Lyon, one-half of the production duo Cool & Dre, who had previously produced music for Cartagena since 2001. Plata O Plomo includes a guest appearance by Stephanie Mills and two follow-up singles, "Cookin'" and "Money Showers", the latter which features Ty Dolla Sign. Earlier in January 2017, Cartagena signed with Jay-Z's company, Roc Nation, in an artist management deal.

On August 2, 2017, Cartagena released "So Excited" with Dre, who co-produced the track with StreetRunner. The song features a sample of Dennis Edwards and Siedah Garrett's "Don't Look Any Further" (1984). On July 24, 2018, he and Dre released "Attention" with Chris Brown. The track appears on Cartagena and Dre's collaborative album, Family Ties, which was released on December 6, 2019. The album also featured the promotional single, "Lord Above", featuring Eminem and Mary J. Blige. On this song, Eminem calls out Nick Cannon, alleging he had sexual relations with Cannon's then-wife Mariah Carey.

In 2018, he created and hosted the Coca Vision podcast on Tidal, where he discusses music, friendships, and pop culture with various celebrity guests. In 2022, following Block's acquisition of Tidal, Coca Vision ended.

Cartagena then appeared on the We TV reality television series, Growing Up Hip Hop: New York, with his son, Ryan.

In July 2020, Cartagena launched the Fat Joe Show on Revolt; the series did not premiere until August 11. In December 2020, he appeared in the ComplexLand virtual event and talked about the best sneakers of the year.

=== 2021–2024: Non-album singles, Verzuz with Ja Rule, guest appearances and the World Changed on Me ===
On January 21, 2021, Cartagena released the non-album single, "Sunshine (The Light)", containing a mashup between Luther Vandross' "Never Too Much" and an acapella version of Rihanna's "Kiss It Better" with a feature credited by Amorphous and DJ Khaled. That same year, he and DJ Drama released a "Gangsta Grillz" exclusive mixtape titled What Would Big Do 2021.

On September 15, 2021, Cartagena reunited with Ja Rule to engage in an online single battle via Verzuz. Their Verzuz battle (curated by co-creators Timbaland and Swizz Beatz) ended when Jadakiss appeared and the three performed their 2004 single, "New York", which was what ignited Cartagena and Jadakiss' mutual feud with Ja Rule's nemesis, 50 Cent, who also reacted to the battle with praise for Cartagena. Cartagena also made controversial comments toward former background singer, Lil' Mo, who previously collaborated with Ja Rule in the 2000s; she responded with scathing online statements.

Throughout 2022, he appeared on two songs: "The Essence" alongside Flee Lord, Mephux and LordMobb and "JOE CRACK", a track produced by Diamond D from his album, The Rear View.

In 2023, Cartagena appeared on Shab's single "Voodoo", which entered the Top 40 on both the Rhythmic and Pop charts. The track interpolates Terror Squad's "Lean Back".

In 2024, Cartagena released another non-album single with Remy Ma, "Outta Control". He then appeared on LL Cool J's single, "Saturday Night Special", alongside Rick Ross; the track appeared on LL's album, The FORCE. In August, Starz announced Cartagena's talk show, Fat Joe Talks; the series premiered October 4 following the series finale of Power Book II: Ghost, whose executive producer, 50 Cent, was once again Cartagena's former rival. That December, he released his long-awaited eleventh studio album, the World Changed on Me. The album was dedicated to his older brother, Angel, who died the previous November. The album included guest appearances by Remy Ma, Chris Rock, Dre, Karma Nova and DJ Khaled, along with two singles, "Paradise" with Anitta and "I Got You" with Babyface.

=== 2025–present: Joe and Jada ===
Maryland governor Wes Moore and Baltimore mayor Brandon Scott on the Joe and Jada podcast, 2026

On May 5, 2025, Cartagena reunited with Jadakiss to form a podcast in partnership with The Volume and sponsorship with Roc Nation and Boost Mobile titled Joe and Jada, which they explore topics related to music, entrepreneurship and sports. This was the recent reunion between the two rappers since 2021 and their first major collaboration of 2025 following their 20-year feud with 50 Cent.

== Business ventures ==
On November 15, 1995, Fat Joe launched an urban clothing line, FJ560. By late 1999, FJ560 was dissolved.

In 2016, Cartagena opened up a sneaker store called Up NYC in Harlem. The company has now expanded to 3 locations. In 2023, he partnered with It's a 10 Haircare to launch an at-home beard and hair coloring collection for men.

== Personal life ==
On June 12, 2022, Cartagena sold his mansion in Miami for $3.25 million.

=== Family ===
Cartagena has been married to his wife, Lorena, since 1995. They met in 1993 at a Miami nightclub where he was performing after former Relativity executive Steve Lobel introduced Cartagena to her. The couple welcomed their only child together, a daughter named Azariah, on May 12, 2006.

Cartagena has two sons from previous relationships: Joey, who was born when Cartagena was 19, and Ryan, who was born in the mid-90s. His son, Joey, has autism and down syndrome; he has discussed raising him as a young single father.

Cartagena's father, mother, sister, brother and grandfather have died.

=== Friends ===
Cartagena's list of friends include Kool DJ Red Alert, Funkmaster Flex (who introduced him to Angie Martinez), LL Cool J, N.O.R.E., Jennifer Lopez, Jadakiss, French Montana, Mary J. Blige, Nas and Ja Rule.

Allies including Charlie Rock LD, Kato, Raul, Cartagena's fellow D.I.T.C. cohort Big L, Big Pun, Chris Lighty, David Stern, Nipsey Hussle, DMX and Irv Gotti have died.

=== Community work ===
In December 2016, Cartagena returned to his old school in the Bronx to donate computers for students with support from Microsoft.

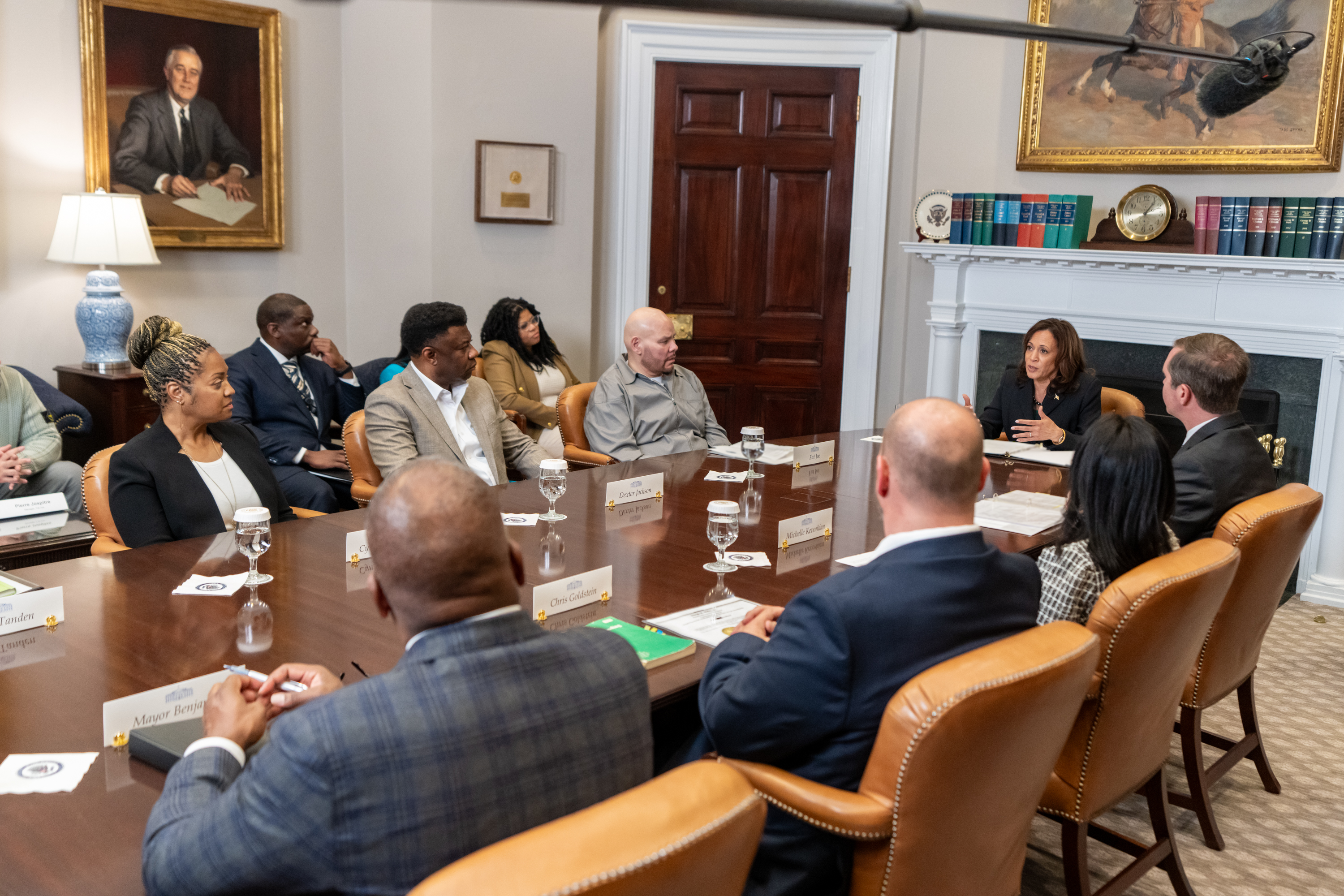
Fat Joe at the White House to discuss cannabis reform in March 2024

In 2008, he attended the grand opening of the Hip Hop Soda Shop in Miami which was a community outreach project set up by Ben Chavis for the youth to hang out and do things such as record music, use the computers and play on Xbox 360s.

At a "School is Cool" assembly in Public School 5 in Jersey City, New Jersey on June 11, 2009, Cartagena was a speaker.

On January 23, 2011, he appeared with Newark mayor Cory Booker and fitness expert Jeff Halevy at an event to promote the Newark branch of Michelle Obama's Let's Move! initiative against childhood obesity.

In March 2024, Cartagena attended a roundtable discussion with former U.S. vice president Kamala Harris at the White House to discuss cannabis policy reform. On November 4, 2024, the day prior to election day, he spoke at a Harris presidential rally in Allentown, Pennsylvania.

On August 8, 2024, to heavy backlash, Cartagena was awarded the key to the city of New York.

=== Weight loss ===
By 1996, he weighed 300 pounds (140 kg). In 2005, ContactMusic.com profiled Cartagena's weight loss efforts.

In 2011, he unveiled his latest weight loss efforts in the video for his song "Drop a Body" after losing 88 pounds (40 kg) off his previous weight of 350 pounds (160 kg). Furthermore, he follows a low-carb approach, eating sweet potatoes but not eating certain carbohydrates such as white bread, white rice, and white pasta.

In 2022, Cartagena said that he would not change his stage name from Fat Joe despite his weight loss, because it would not be a good marketing move.

In 2024, he revealed that he uses the GLP-1 agonist drug Ozempic to help maintain a healthy weight.

=== Legal issues ===
On September 8, 1998, Cartagena and Big Pun were arrested on assault charges for hitting a man with a baseball bat and stealing the man's gold chain on June 14 that year. Cartagena was arrested again on May 12, 2002, for allegedly fighting with another man at B.B. King's Blues Club in Times Square, but the charges were dropped on January 10, 2003.

In two murder cases, Cartagena has been named a witness:

- His former bodyguard, Jose Mulero (also known as Sing Sing), was arrested on September 17, 2004, for the April 15, 1994, shooting death of 16-year-old Ernesto Rivera at a Bronx nightclub. Responding to a subpoena, Cartagena claimed to have heard the shooting and seen people fleeing the scene, but investigators argued that he was standing closer to Mulero, by a door.
- Miami Beach police also named Cartagena as a witness in a 2007 Memorial Day double murder outside David's Cafe II in South Beach. Jermaine "Wufgang" Chamberline of Miami Gardens was accused of shooting Lessli Paz and Joey Navarro to death on that morning; Cartagena and the two victims were sitting in a rented Cadillac Escalade parked outside the restaurant when a fight broke out between passengers and another man.

In August 2014, Liza Rios, widow of Big Pun, filed a $2.3 million lawsuit against Cartagena and Steve Rifkind, founder of Loud Records, regarding unpaid royalties for two of the rapper's studio albums, Capital Punishment (1998) and Yeeeah Baby (2000). Music producer and disc jockey Jellybean Benitez was also named as a co-defendant, due to his ownership in Big Pun's publishing. Rios additionally stated through her attorney that she was not paid any royalties from Cartagena nor Rifkind since 2005. On June 22, 2016, both parties settled out-of-court for undisclosed reasons. Cartagena and Liza Rios are no longer on speaking terms, due to the severity of the lawsuit. In 2021, their dispute resurfaced. That March, Cartagena was absent from an event in the Bronx, with a street being renamed in Pun's honor. Cartagena admitted that his ongoing dispute with Pun's estate was what caused him not to attend the ceremony. Then, in September, Liza Rios claimed Cartagena "robbed" Big Pun's estate of the royalties he was supposedly owed up until his death in 2000. Cartagena responded that Rios refused to approve of a Big Pun biographical film. Rapper N.O.R.E., who also hosted the podcast, Drink Champs, also defended Cartagena against Rios' allegation. Cartagena and Rios also argued over a Big Pun documentary that was released in 2002, with the former claiming that the latter had used half the money he paid her with the intent to settle the royalty dispute, but instead to finance the documentary, which included a camera footage of Rios being assaulted by Pun. On December 22, 2024, Liza Rios stormed out of an interview on the Uppercut podcast when she was asked about Cartagena.

In 2019, Cartagena, Remy Ma and French Montana were filed suit by rapper Fly Havana over songwriting royalties regarding their 2016 single, "All the Way Up". On January 8, 2022, the lawsuit was dismissed. In October 2023, the United States Court of Appeals for the Ninth Circuit reopened the plaintiff's claims, with a circuit panel stating in a 30-page opinion that the "lower court abused its discretion". Cartagena's request to dismiss the lawsuit was rejected by a judge.

On April 29, 2025, Cartagena filed a lawsuit against his former hype man, Terrance "T.A." Dixon, for defamation and extortion after the defendant made false accusations against him, regarding child sexual abuse or calling Cartagena a pedophile. On June 19, 2025, Dixon filed a $20 million lawsuit with the complaint alleging Fat Joe engaged in sex acts with minors and repeatedly coerced Dixon into more than 4,000 sexual acts to maintain his standing within Cartagena's enterprise.

==== Tax evasion ====
In December 2012, Cartagena pleaded guilty to tax evasion for not paying income tax on over $3 million from 2007 to 2010. On June 24, 2013, he was sentenced to four months in prison for tax evasion. He began the sentence on August 26, 2013, and was released on November 28, 2013.

=== Feud with 50 Cent ===
50 Cent ignited a feud with Cartagena when the latter collaborated with Ja Rule, a well-known rival of 50 Cent and G-Unit. The feud took aim at him following his 2002 single, "What's Luv?", which featured Ja Rule. Cartagena continued his collaborations with Ja Rule on the latter's 2004 single, "New York" (which also featured Jadakiss), prompting 50 Cent to release a diss track aimed at both Cartagena and Jadakiss titled "Piggy Bank", a track on 50 Cent's sophomore studio album, The Massacre (2005). Cartagena later responded with "My Fofo", a track from his sixth studio album, All or Nothing (2005), which released later that same year.

Cartagena subsequently attacked 50's street credibility and called him a "coward" on a phone interview with DJ Kay Slay via Hot 97. Tensions boiled over during the 2005 MTV Video Music Awards when Cartagena presented the award for Best Hip Hop Video, during which he told the audience "I feel so safe tonight with all this police protection courtesy of G-Unit". 50 Cent later retaliated with a profanity-laden diatribe following his performance of the song, "So Seductive" with former G-Unit artist Tony Yayo, exclaiming "Fat Joe's a pussy man! Pussy boy, fuck boy, nigga what?!". The feud later affected Cartagena financially as he sought to secure a $20 million contract endorsing Air Jordan sneakers in early 2005; Michael Jordan himself later cancelled the contract following the VMA incident as he was in fear of conflict with 50 Cent or other affiliates. Verbal disputes between Cartagena and 50 Cent continued during this time period: in September 2007, on the BET program Rap City, 50 Cent accused Cartagena of being cowardly for not willing to confront him, but Cartagena dismissed this claim as "nonsense". Later, in January 2008, 50 Cent released another diss towards Cartagena, called "Southside Nigga (I'm Leaving)". On March 20, 2008, shortly after sales were revealed, regarding Cartagena's eighth album, The Elephant in the Room, 50 Cent released a video via YouTube, which features the "funeral" of Cartagena, which shows 50 Cent crying in the fake footage. 50 Cent then talks about Cartagena's record sales and states that he ended his career (contrary to popular belief and in similarity towards Ja Rule) and that his mixtape "blew out" Cartagena's album, referring to G-Unit's Elephant in the Sand (Volume II).

Following this, little action was taken on either side as the feud seemed to calm down by 2011. Murder Inc. Records co-founder Irv Gotti (1970-2025) later expressed anger at Cartagena following his proposal to quell their longstanding feud with G-Unit in 2010. In 2012, 50 Cent approached Cartagena in talks of ending the feud following the two agreeing to perform at a memorial ceremony for deceased music executive, Chris Lighty, who also served as a manager and mentor for both artists. The feud was finally squashed when Cartagena and 50 Cent performed at the 2012 BET Hip Hop Awards in Lighty's honor. Despite the prior history between the two, they became close friends and business associates shortly thereafter despite Cartagena's lengthy connections with Ja Rule.

DJ Kay Slay mixed a track titled "Free Again", featuring both Cartagena and 50 Cent, unbeknownst to both rappers. The song was released in 2014. Ten years later, in 2024, 50 Cent admitted regret for starting the feud with Cartagena.

=== Feud with Cuban Link ===
In the early 2000s, Cartagena started feuding with rapper Cuban Link after the former allegedly shelved the latter's planned debut studio album, 24K, which was set to be released on Atlantic Records and Terror Squad Entertainment. This caused Cuban to leave Terror Squad and go solo; he also alleged that Cartagena had him blackballed from the industry which forced Cuban to go underground. In May 2001, Cartagena got into an altercation with rapper SunKiss at a release party for Angie Martinez's debut studio album, Up Close and Personal. Cuban tried to stop the fight but it resulted in him getting his face cut which left long-lasting scars on his face.

=== LGBT beliefs and support ===
During an interview with Vlad TV, Cartagena stated that he believes that people in the LGBTQ community should not hide their sexuality and should stand by who they are. He mentioned that it is possible that he has done songs with gay rappers and that there are likely several gay people besides rappers in the hip hop industry who are in the closet, describing it as a "Gay Mafia".

His comments came after he was asked to comment on radio personality Mister Cee (1966-2024) being arrested for public lewdness with a transgender prostitute.

=== Professional allegations ===
In November 2022, Rolling Stone reported musician Cedric Baldwin alleged that Fat Joe used a supportive direct message on Instagram to solicit payment for professional opportunities. Baldwin stated that after receiving an unsolicited message from Joe telling him to "keep grinding," Joe followed up by asking what Baldwin's "budget" was to "make moves." Baldwin characterized the interaction as "instant deflation" and cited it as an example of the "dirty game" within the music industry. A representative for Fat Joe did not respond to requests for comment.

== Discography ==
Studio albums

- Represent (1993)
- Jealous One's Envy (1995)
- Don Cartagena (1998)
- Jealous Ones Still Envy (J.O.S.E.) (2001)
- Loyalty (2002)
- All or Nothing (2005)
- Me, Myself & I (2006)
- The Elephant in the Room (2008)
- Jealous Ones Still Envy 2 (J.O.S.E. 2) (2009)
- The Darkside Vol. 1 (2010)
- The World Changed On Me (2024)
- Organized Rhyme (2026)

Collaborative albums

- Terror Squad: The Album (with Terror Squad) (1999)
- True Story (with Terror Squad) (2004)
- Plata O Plomo (with Remy Ma) (2017)
- Family Ties (with Dre) (2019)
- What Would Big Do 2021 (with DJ Drama) (2021)

== Filmography ==
=== Film ===
Year	Title	Role	Notes
1994	I Like It Like That	Biker Inmate	
1999	Urban Menace	Terror	Video
1999	Whiteboyz	Don Flip Crew #2	
1999	Thicker Than Water	Lonzo	
2001	Blazin'	Big Jay	
2001	Prison Song	Big Pete	
2002	Empire	Tito Severe	
2003	Scary Movie 3	Himself	
2006	Happy Feet	Seymour (voice)	
2009	Breathe	Eddie Cortes	Short
2011	The Cookout 2	Bookie	
2011	Narx	Big Ed	
2015	Supermodel	Xavier	
2016	Checkmate	Freddie "Flash" Morales	
2017	Lady Rider	Freddie "Flash" Morales	
2018	Night School	Bobby	
2020	Fearless	DJ (voice)	
2022	Hustle	Himself	
2024	This Is Me... Now: A Love Story	Therapist	

=== Television ===
Year	Title	Role	Notes
2003	Chappelle's Show	Himself	Episode: "Great Moments In Hookup History & Ask A Black Dude"
2003	Intimate Portrait	Himself	Episode: "Ashanti"
2004	MTV Cribs	Himself	Episode: "21 November 2004"
2005	Unique Whips	Himself	Episode: "Lincolns, Strippers and Bentleys, Oh My"
2005	The Apprentice	Himself	Episode: "Bling It On"
2005	It's Showtime at the Apollo	Himself	Episode: "Fat Joe"
2005	Top of the Pops	Himself	Episode: "Episode #42.18 & #42.21"
2005	Diary	Himself	Episode: "Fat Joe and Friends"
2005	The Andy Milonakis Show	Himself	Episode: "Episode #1.6"
2006	Driven	Himself	Episode: "LL Cool J"
2006	Fuse Celebrity Playlist	Himself	Episode: "Fat Joe"
2008	SBC Blue Room	Himself	Episode: "Fat Joe"
2008	The Greatest	Himself	Episode: "100 Greatest Hip Hop Songs"
2016	Inside the Label	Himself	Episode: "Terror Squad Entertainment"
2016	Live from the Streets	Himself	Episode: "MIA, feat. Rara Kuyu, Fat Joe, DJ Brace and TonTon"
2017	Unsung	Himself	Episode: "Fat Joe"
2017	Celebrity Sweat	Himself	Episode: "Episode #3.2"
2017	So Cosmo	Himself	Episode: "Vol. 1, No. 4: Fun Fearless Money"
2017–18	Hip Hop Squares	Himself	Recurring Guest: Season 3 & 5
2017–19	She's Gotta Have It	Winny Win Winford	Recurring Cast
2018	Remy & Papoose: Meet the Mackies	Himself	Episode: ""Dadchelor Party"
2019	Hip-Hop Evolution	Himself	Recurring Cast: Season 3
2019	Rhythm + Flow	Himself/Guest Judge	Episode: "New York Auditions"
2019	Growing Up Hip Hop: New York	Himself	Recurring Cast
2021–22	The Wendy Williams Show	Himself/Guest Co-Host	Recurring Guest Co-Host: Season 14
2022	30 for 30	Himself	Episode: "The Greatest Mixtape Ever"
2022	Origins of Hip Hop	Himself	Recurring Guest
2022	The Captain	Himself	Recurring Guest
2022	Murder Inc Records Docu	Himself	Recurring Guest
2022–24	BET Hip Hop Awards	Himself/Host	Main Host
2023	Fight the Power: How Hip-Hop Changed the World	Himself	Main Guest
2023	Leguizamo Does America	Himself	Episode: "New York"
2023	Celebrity Game Face	Himself/Contestant	Episode: "Music Hitmakers Edition"
2023	Hip Hop Treasures	Himself	Recurring Guest
2024	Celebrity Family Feud	Himself/Contestant	Episode: "Episode #11.6"
2024	Fat Joe Talks	Himself/Host	Main Host
2025	Hell's Kitchen	Himself	Episode: "The Heat is Coming to Hell's Kitchen"
2025	Godfather of Harlem	Slim Lou	Episode: "The Pawn Goes First"

=== Music videos ===
Year	Song	Artist
1994	"Heaven & Hell"	Raekwon featuring Ghostface Killah
1994	"Suckas Need Bodyguards"	Gang Starr
1994	"Put It On"	Big L featuring Kid Capri
1995	"Danger"	Blahzay Blahzay
1995	"MC's Act Like They Don't Know"	KRS-One
1996	"Actual Facts"	Lord Finesse featuring Grand Puba, Large Professor & Sadat X
1997	"I'm Not a Player"	Big Pun
1998	"Still Not a Player"	Big Pun featuring Joe
1999	"Notorious B.I.G."	The Notorious B.I.G. featuring Puff Daddy & Lil' Kim
2000	"It's So Hard"	Big Pun featuring Donell Jones
2000	"Still Telling Lies"	Cuban Link
2001	"Feelin' on Yo Booty"	R. Kelly
2001	"Fight Music"	D12
2002	"Full Mode"	N.O.R.E.
2003	"Where the Hood At?"	DMX
2005	"Nasty Girl"	The Notorious B.I.G. featuring Diddy, Nelly, Jagged Edge & Avery Storm
2006	"Smack That"	Akon featuring Eminem
2007	"Speedin'"	Rick Ross featuring R. Kelly
2007	"Get Buck in Here"	DJ Felli Fel featuring Diddy, Akon, Ludacris & Lil Jon
2007	"100 Million"	Birdman featuring Young Jeezy, Rick Ross & Lil Wayne
2008	"The Boss"	Rick Ross featuring T-Pain
2008	"Cash Flow"	Ace Hood featuring T-Pain and Rick Ross
2008	"Krazy"	Pitbull featuring Lil Jon
2008	"Throw Them Staxxx"	Benisour featuring Billy Blue & Clete
2010	"B.M.F. (Blowin' Money Fast)"	Rick Ross featuring Styles P
2011	"Hustle Hard (Remix)"	Rick Ross featuring Rick Ross & Lil Wayne
2012	"Amen"	Meek Mill featuring Drake
2023	"Fever"	Nas

=== Video Games ===
Year	Title	Role	Notes
2004	Def Jam Fight For NY	Crack	Voice role and likeness
2006	Def Jam Fight for NY: The Takeover	Crack	Voice role and likeness
2007	Def Jam: Icon	Himself	Voice role and likeness

=== Documentary ===
Year	Title	Notes
2006	Rap Sheet: Hip-Hop and the Cops	

=== Commercials ===
Year	Title	Brand	Role	Notes
2024	"Dunkin’ ‘The DunKings’ ft Ben Affleck, Matt Damon, Tom Brady, Jack Harlow, Jennifer Lopez, & Fat Joe"	Dunkin' Brands	Himself	Super Bowl commercial

== Awards and nominations ==
=== ASCAP Rhythm & Soul Music Awards ===
Year	Nominated work	Award	Result
2005	What's Luv?	Top Soundtrack Song of the Year	Won

=== Billboard Latin Music Awards ===
Year	Nominated work	Award	Result
2006	I Don't Care/Que Mas Da (Dance Remixes)	Latin Dance Club Play Track of the Year	Won

=== Grammy Awards ===
Year	Nominated work	Award	Result
2003	"What's Luv?" (featuring Ashanti)	Best Rap/Sung Collaboration	Nominated
2005	"Lean Back" (Terror Squad)	Best Rap Performance by a Duo or Group	Nominated
2008	"Make It Rain" (featuring Lil Wayne)	Best Rap Performance by a Duo or Group	Nominated
2017	"All the Way Up" (with Remy Ma featuring French Montana & Infared)	Best Rap Performance	Nominated
2017	"All the Way Up" (with Remy Ma featuring French Montana & Infared)	Best Rap Song	Nominated

=== iHeartRadio Music Awards ===
Year	Nominated work	Award	Result
2017	"All the Way Up" (with Remy Ma featuring French Montana & Infared)	Hip-Hop Song of the Year	Nominated

=== BET Awards ===
Year	Nominated work	Award	Result
2005	Lean Back	Viewer's Choice	Nominated
2017	Fat Joe & Remy Ma	Best Group	Nominated

=== MTV Video Music Awards ===
Year	Nominated work	Award	Result
2002	What's Luv?	Best Hip-Hop Video	Nominated

== See also ==
- List of Puerto Ricans
- Latin hip hop
- List of number-one dance hits (United States)
- List of artists who reached number one on the US Dance chart
- List of Cubans
