= Fight the Power: How Hip-Hop Changed the World =

2023 documentary miniseries

- Genre: Documentary
- Directed by: Yemi Bamiro
- Starring: Chuck D will.i.am Sister Souljah; Ice-T; Warren G Dead Prez; Public Enemy
- Country of origin: United States
- Original language: English
- No. of episodes: 4

Production
- Producers: Chuck D, Lorrie Boula
- Running time: 240 minutes
- Production companies: BBC Studios, PBS

Original release
- Network: PBS, BBC Studios
- Release: January 31 – February 21, 2023

Fight the Power: How Hip-Hop Changed the World is a 2023 BBC Studios television documentary production in collaboration with PBS, presented by Chuck D of Public Enemy. It was broadcast as a four-part miniseries starting in late January 2023 on BBC Studios' BBC2, with a series run through Black History Month in February 2023. How Hip-Hop Changed the World was occasioned to coincide with the 50th anniversary of hip hop music.

== Overview ==
The documentary concerned the history of rap music and hip-hop culture in the United States, from its origins in the Bronx to mainstream stardom at the turn of the 20th century, to the present day. The documentary focuses a lens on the political aspects and ramifications of Hip-hop music in a reactionary culture.

== Episodes ==
Each 55 minute episode of the four episodes of How Hip-Hop Changed the World covered a different era and its politically charged history.

No.	Title	Time period	Themes	Original release date
1	"The Foundation"	1960s - 70s	Beginning of rap music, New York City in the 60s and 70s	January 31, 2023
Bronx, Grandmaster Flash, Furious Five
2	"Under Siege"	1980s	Riots and criminal reform activism	January 31, 2023
L.A. riots, Ice-T, illmatic, Nas
3	"Culture Wars"	2000s	From 9/11 to rap mainstream superstardom	January 31, 2023
Artists: will.i.am, Jay-Z, Atlanta hip hop, Dead Prez
4	"Still Fighting"	2010s	'New activism	January 31, 2023
Artists: J. Cole

== Reception ==
The review of the BBC's production debut by The Guardian states, "with ambitions to inform as well as entertain... a trade-off between sociology and musicology: the records say this and sound like that because this is what was happening in the world at the time. In the case of hip-hop, the scene was a more direct response to political circumstances than any popular music before it." According to the Decider, this documentary will remind viewers of Summer of Soul (...Or, When the Revolution Could Not Be Televised), and "as riots, social injustice, the rise of the Black Power movement, and the voices of Black political and religious leaders raised consciousness, so too did music pick up the narrative." Writing for Billboard.com, Gail Mitchell concluded: "Overall, Fight the Power: How Hip Hop Changed the World, is a vital living history lesson that can't be found in any school history books."

== See also ==
- Hip-Hop: Beyond Beats and Rhymes (2006)
- Summer of Soul (...Or, When the Revolution Could Not Be Televised) (2021)
- Something from Nothing: The Art of Rap (2012)
