= Rico Love discography =

- Studio albums: 2
- Extended plays: 1
- Singles: 7
- Music videos: 4
- Guest appearances: 20

The discography of record producer, songwriter, singer, and rapper Rico Love consists of two studio albums and one EP, and seven singles (as a lead artist).

== Albums ==
=== Studio albums ===
List of studio albums, with selected chart positions and certifications
Title	Album details	Peak chart positions	
Title	Album details	US	US R&B/HH
Turn the Lights On	Released: May 19, 2015; Label: Division 1, Interscope Records; Format: CD, digital download	175	16
Even Kings Die	Released: December 3, 2018; Label: Division 1; Format: Digital download	—	—

=== Miscellaneous ===
List of miscellaneous albums, with selected information
Title	Album details	Notes
The 5th Element	Released: (US) (unreleased); Label: Division 1, Crown World, US Records, J Records; Format: Bootleg, digital download	Originally meant to be released as Rico Love's debut studio album, its release was canceled after Love decided to focus on his songwriting and not release the recordings

== EPs ==
Title	Album details	Peak chart positions
Title	Album details	US R&B/HH
Discrete Luxury	Released: August 27, 2013; Re-Released: February 27, 2014; Label: Division 1, Interscope Records; Format: CD, digital download	48

== Mixtapes ==
Rico Love's mixtapes and details
Title	Mixtape details
El Presidente	Released: December 9, 2013; Label: Division 1
I Sin	Released: August 27, 2014; Label: Division 1

== Singles ==
=== As lead artist ===
List of singles, with selected chart positions, showing year released and album name
Title	Year	Peak chart positions				Album
Title	Year	US	US R&B/HH	US R&B	US Rap	Album
"Settle Down"	2005	—	—	—	—	In the Mix
"Don't Stop"	2007	—	—	—	—	The 5th Element
"What You Saying" (featuring Usher)	2007	—	—	—	—	The 5th Element
"They Don't Know"	2013	60	14	13	—	Discrete Luxury (EP)
"Bitches Be Like"	2014	—	—	—	—	Discrete Luxury (EP)
"Somebody Else"	2015	—	—	—	—	TTLO
"Days Go By"	2015	—	—	—	—	TTLO
"—" denotes a recording that did not chart or was not released in that territory.

=== As featured artist ===
List of singles, with selected chart positions, showing year released and album name
Title	Year	Peak chart positions		Album
Title	Year	US	US R&B/HH	Album
"Aloha" (Fat Joe featuring Pleasure P and Rico Love)	2009	—	86	Jealous Ones Still Envy 2 (J.O.S.E. 2)
"Bananaz" (Ray J featuring Rico Love)	2011	—	63	Non-album single
"Faithful" (Plies featuring Rico Love)	2013	—	—	Purple Heart
"Keep Calm" (DJ Kay Slay featuring Juicy J, Jadakiss, 2 Chainz and Rico Love)	2013	—	—	Non-album single
"Not Mines" (Yung Berg featuring Rico Love, Juicy J and MarVo)	2015	—	—	Love Project 2
"Real One" (Trina featuring Rico Love)	2015	—	—	Non-album single
"—" denotes a recording that did not chart or was not released in that territory.

== Guest appearances ==
List of non-single guest appearances, with other performing artists, showing year released and album name
Title	Year	Other performer(s)	Album
"Seen The Light"	2005	Chris Brown	—N/a
"I'm Out Chere"	2009	Juvenile	Cocky & Confident
"Girl Like This"	2009	Mams Taylor	King Amongst Men - The Lost Album
"Lay Me Down"	2010	T.I.	No Mercy
"Freak"	2010	Jamie Foxx	Best Night of My Life
"Party Girls"	2010	Ya Boy	—N/a
"Break Em Down"	2010	Young Chris	The Re-Introduction
"Take a Picture"	2010	Young Chris	The Re-Introduction
"None of Dem"	2010	Young Chris, Emjay	The Re-Introduction
"All Of The Night"	2011	Kelly Rowland	Here I Am
"It's Gon Be On"	2011	Trey Songz	—N/a
"A$$-ETS"	2011	Young Chris	—N/a
"That's All Me"	2011	DJ T. Neal, Teairra Marí	—N/a
"Faithful"	2013	Plies	—N/a
"Fuck Sleep"	2013	Kid Ink	Almost Home
"Pay Attention"	2014	Big K.R.I.T.	Cadillactica
"Complaining"	2014	Kevin Gates	Luca Brasi 2
"Not Mines"	2015	Yung Berg, Juicy J, MarVo	Love Project 2
"Little Hood"	2015	Waka Flocka Flame	Salute Me or Shoot Me 5
"Give It To Her"	2015	Dave East	Hate Me Now
"What About the Rest of Us"	2015	Action Bronson, Joey Badass	Southpaw: Original Motion Picture Soundtrack
"Celebrate"	2016	Wiz Khalifa	Khalifa
"Of Course"	2016	Giggs	Landlord
"Let It Be Love"	2016	Jessica Sutta	Feline Resurrection
"I Say Yes"	2017	Jessica Sutta	I Say Yes
"Miss My Woe"	2017	Gucci Mane	Mr. Davis
"Water"	2019	Trina	The One
"Flash It"	2021	KSI	All Over the Place
