= (Ha Ha) Slow Down =

Single by Fat Joe featuring Young Jeezy

from the album The Darkside Vol. 1
- Released: February 2010 (radio); April 13, 2010 (iTunes)
- Recorded: 2009
- Genre: Hip hop; hardcore hip hop
- Length: 3:26
- Label: E1; Terror Squad
- Songwriters: Joseph Cartagena; Jay Jenkins; Trevor Beresford Romeo
- Producers: Scoop DeVille; Jonathan Nemr

Fat Joe singles chronology
"Aloha" (2009)	"(Ha Ha) Slow Down" (2010)	"If It Ain't About Money" (2010)

Young Jeezy singles chronology
"Put Your Hands Up" (2010)	"(Ha Ha) Slow Down" (2010)	"Lose My Mind" (2010)

"(Ha Ha) Slow Down" is the first single from Fat Joe's tenth studio album The Darkside Vol. 1. The song features rapper Young Jeezy. It also contains a short sample of Soul II Soul's "Back to Life (However Do You Want Me)" (a capella version) throughout the entire beat.

== Remixes ==
Several rappers have recorded freestyles over the song's instrumental, including The Lox, Talib Kweli, Shyne, Jae Millz, Game, Rick Ross, Nipsey Hussle, Capone-N-Noreaga, Raekwon, Uncle Murda, Jim Jones, Rayne Storm and French Montana. More elements of "Back to Life (However Do You Want Me)" are sampled on Maino's version.

== Music video ==
The music video was produced by Parris and features a cameo by Diddy, Trina, Waah (Ruff Ryders Entertainment CEO) & Al Harrington (professional NBA player from the Denver Nuggets).

== Charts ==
Chart (2010)	Peak position
US Hot R&B/Hip-Hop Songs (Billboard)	54
US Hot Rap Songs (Billboard)	23
