= The Darkside Vol. 1 =

Studio album by Fat Joe
- Released: July 27, 2010
- Recorded: 2009–2010
- Genres: Hip hop; hardcore hip hop
- Length: 49:11
- Labels: TS; E1
- Producers: Cool & Dre (also exec.); Macho TS (exec.) (also exec.); DJ Premier; Dope Boyz; I.L.O.; Infamous; Just Blaze; Laurent "Slick" Cohen; Raw Uncut, Scram Jones; Scoop DeVille; Streetrunner

Fat Joe chronology
Jealous Ones Still Envy 2 (J.O.S.E. 2) (2009)	The Darkside Vol. 1 (2010)	The Darkside Vol. 2 (2011)

Singles from The Darkside Vol. 1
- 1. "(Ha Ha) Slow Down" Released: April 13, 2010; 2. "If It Ain't About Money" Released: June 30, 2010

The Darkside Vol. 1 is the tenth studio album by American rapper Fat Joe. The album was released July 27, 2010 by Terror Squad Entertainment and E1 Music. Its production was handled by Cool & Dre, Streetrunner, DJ Infamous, Just Blaze, Scram Jones, DJ Premier, Raw Uncut, and Scoop DeVille, among others, while guest appearances include Trey Songz, Too Short, R. Kelly, Cam'ron, Clipse, Lil Wayne and Young Jeezy.

== Background ==
The album was announced in January 2010 by Fat Joe saying that "he was working on a new album, The Darkside: Volume 1". MTV News reported that Fat Joe intended "all the material...to be much harsher" than his previous album. On March 28, 2010, Fat Joe signed a record deal with E1 Music and announced that he would release The Darkside Vol. 1 through the label in July. Fat Joe stated The Darkside Vol. 1 is all about: showin' the world that I'm a legend, and just furtherin' the legacy." Fat Joe stated that he returned to his hardcore hip hop roots and considers this album to be a classic.

== Singles ==
The first single from The Darkside is "(Ha Ha) Slow Down", which features rapper Young Jeezy. The song peaked at number 54 on US Hot R&B/Hip-Hop Songs and number 23 on their Hot Rap Songs chart. The second single is "If It Ain't About Money" featuring Trey Songz. The song charted on US Hot R&B/Hip-Hop Songs, peaking at number 57, and also charted at 25 on the US Hot Rap Songs chart.

== Critical reception ==
Professional ratings
Aggregate scores
Source	Rating
Metacritic	70/100
Review scores
Source	Rating
AllHipHop	8/10
Allmusic	3.5/5 stars
DJBooth	3.5/5 stars
Entertainment Weekly	B+
Now	2/5 stars
The Phoenix	2.5/4 stars
RapReviews	7/10
Spin	7/10
USA Today	2.5/4 stars
XXL	(XL)

The Darkside Vol. 1 received positive reviews from music critics. On Metacritic, the album has a score of 70 out of 100, based on 6 critics, indicating "generally favorable reviews". Allmusic gave it 3½ out of 5 stars, stating "instead of sounding uninspired on topics he's visited, revisited, and then some, he sounds on fire, as if this were his grand debut." HipHopDX gave the album 4 out of 5 stars, praising its "Hardcore lyricism backed by the conviction that has been lacking since the '90s," also calling it his "best-produced album in over a decade." RapReviews gave it a 7/10 rating, writing "Reputation now restored, Joe finds himself comfortably back in the role of narrator to the streets." ThaCorner gave it 3½ out of 5 stars, noting "at the end of the thirteen track album you'll find that Joe impresses more with his skill to put together a hot album than his actual skills as a rapper."

== Commercial performance ==
The Darkside Vol. 1 debuted at number 27 on the US Billboard 200 chart, selling 12,300 copies in the first week. The album also debuted number nine on the US Top R&B/Hip-Hop Albums and number seven on US Top Rap Albums charts respectively. The album made it to number two on the US Top Independent Albums chart.

== Track listing ==
This complete track list was published by Amazon.

No.	Title	Producer(s)	Length
1.	"Intro"	Scram Jones	2:24
2.	"Valley of Death"	Cool & Dre; Zeferiah	3:39
3.	"I Am Crack"	Just Blaze	3:43
4.	"Kilo" (featuring Clipse & Cam'ron)	Infamous; Laurent "Slick" Cohen (co.)	4:01
5.	"Rappers Are in Danger"	Infamous	3:16
6.	"(Ha Ha) Slow Down" (featuring Young Jeezy)	Scoop DeVille	3:25
7.	"If It Ain't About Money" (featuring Trey Songz)	Cool & Dre; Zeferiah	3:53
8.	"No Problems" (featuring Rico Love)	Scoop DeVille	2:57
9.	"How Did We Get Here" (featuring R. Kelly)	Raw Uncut	4:20
10.	"Money Over Bitches" (featuring Too Short & TA)	Raw Uncut	3:59
11.	"Heavenly Father" (featuring Lil Wayne)	Streetrunner; I.L.O. (add.)	4:05
12.	"I'm Gone"	DJ Premier	6:21
13.	"At Last Supremacy" (featuring Busta Rhymes) (Bonus Track)	Cool & Dre; Dope Boyz; Zeferiah	3:54

Sample credits

- "Intro" – Contains a sample of "Just a Memory" by The Notorious B.I.G. featuring Clipse
- "Valley of Death" – Contains a sample of "Do I Stand a Chance" by The Montclairs
- "Kilo" – Contains a sample of "I Weigh With Kilos" by Jimmy Van & Richard Hieronymus
- "Rappers Are in Danger" – Contains a sample of "Time's Up" by O.C.
- "(Ha Ha) Slow Down" – Contains a sample of "Back to Life (A cappella)" by Soul II Soul
- "No Problems" – Contains samples of "Flash's Theme" by Queen and "Terminator X to the Edge of Panic" by Public Enemy
- "Heavenly Father" – Contains a sample of "Pray to the Lord" by Lil Wayne

== Charts ==
Chart (2010)	Peak position
US Billboard 200	27
US Top Independent Albums (Billboard)	2
US Top R&B/Hip-Hop Albums (Billboard)	9
US Top Rap Albums (Billboard)	7
