= Aloha (Fat Joe song) =

Single by Fat Joe featuring Pleasure P & Rico Love

from the album Jealous Ones Still Envy 2 (J.O.S.E. 2)
- Released: August 25, 2009
- Recorded: 2009
- Genre: Hip hop
- Length: 3:58
- Label: Imperial; Terror Squad
- Songwriters: Rico Love; Fat Joe; Marcus Cooper; Eric Goudy; Earl Hood
- Producers: Rico Love; Earl & E

Fat Joe singles chronology
"One" (2009)	"Aloha" (2009)	"(Ha Ha) Slow Down" (2010)

"Aloha" is the second single by American rapper Fat Joe from his album Jealous Ones Still Envy 2 (J.O.S.E. 2). It features American singers Pleasure P and Rico Love.

== Music video ==
The music video for "Aloha" was filmed in the middle of August 2009 and released on September 11, 2009. It was directed by Dayo.

== Track listing ==
1. Aloha (radio version)
2. Aloha (explicit version)
3. Aloha (instrumental)

== Charts ==
Chart (2009)	Peak position
US Hot R&B/Hip-Hop Songs (Billboard)	86
