= The Darkside Vol. 2 =

Mixtape by Fat Joe
- Released: October 31, 2011
- Recorded: 2010–2011
- Genres: Hip hop; hardcore hip hop
- Length: 34:57
- Label: Terror Squad
- Producers: Mark Henry; Hype; RoJ; TwinkiE

Fat Joe chronology
The Darkside Vol. 1 (2010)	The Darkside Vol. 2 (2011)	The Darkside Vol. 3 (2013)

The Darkside Vol. 2 is the second mixtape by rapper Fat Joe. The mixtape was released October 31, 2011. The mixtape's production was primarily handled by Mark Henry, Hype and RoJ & TwinkiE.

== Background ==
Originally after the release of The Darkside Vol. 1, Fat Joe stated during an interview with Sway on MTV RapFix Live in August 2010 that he planned to release another two volumes of The Darkside, then retire. However, in December 2010 during an interview with GlobalGrind, Fat Joe stated that he was working on a new album which wasn't a Darkside album and was going to release The Darkside Vol. 2 as a mixtape.

== Promotion ==
In June 2011, Drop a Body was released for the debuted as a music video on World Star Hip-Hop.
On October 24, 2011, "Welcome To The Darkside" featuring French Montana was premiered by DJ Green Lantern on Hip-Hop Nation.
On October 30, 2011, a day before the release of the mixtape, "Dopeman" featuring Jadakiss and Dre was released.

A music video for "Welcome To The Darkside" was released on November 5, 2011.
On January 18, 2012, the music video for "So Fly" was released. It features exterior shots of Fat Joe's house in Miami.

== Track listing ==
#	Title	Featured guest(s)	Producer	Length
1	"Welcome to the Darkside"	French Montana	RoJ; TwinkiE	4:53
2	"Dopeman"	Jadakiss; Dre	Hype	4:33
3	"So Fly"	Arland	Mark Henry	3:24
4	"Big Business"		Mark Henry	2:28
5	"Angels Say"		Mark Henry	3:27
6	"Pushing Keys"	Raekwon	Mark Henry	4:22
7	"Drop a Body"		Mark Henry	3:21
8	"My Lord"		Mark Henry	1:46
9	"Fuck Them Other Niggas"		Mark Henry	2:59
10	"Around the World"	Arland	Mark Henry	3:44
