= The Darkside III =

Darkside III

Mixtape by Fat Joe
- Released: August 26, 2013
- Recorded: 2012–2013
- Genres: Hip hop, hardcore hip-hop
- Length: 26:42
- Label: Terror Squad
- Producers: 9th Wonder, Cool & Dre, Diamond D, DJ Premier, iLLA, Streetrunner, Sap

Fat Joe chronology
The Darkside Vol. 2 (2011)	Darkside III (2013)	Plata O Plomo (2017)

Darkside III is the third volume in the Darkside series by rapper Fat Joe. The mixtape was released August 26, 2013 via DatPiff.

== Background ==
On December 3, 2012 the sequel to The Darkside Vol. 2 track Angel Sings was released with Fat Joe announcing Darkside III was in the works at the end of the song.

On December 20, 2012 he pleaded guilty to tax evasion and was released on bail.

The video for Angels Say 2 produced by Eif Rivera was released on January 7, 2013. On February 21, 2013 a new track with accompanying video directed by Mind Muscle CX was released titled Ceilings 2 The Sky.

On June 24, 2013 Joe was sentenced to 4 months in prison to begin on August 26, 2013 for tax evasion.

After a tweet from a fan on July 9, 2013 he confirmed the Darkside III release date. On July 4, 2013 he revealed on Twitter that he had been given a beat by 9th Wonder then on July 29, 2013 he further revealed on Twitter that Darkside Vol. 3 would also have beats by Cool & Dre, Diamond D, Illa Da Producer and Streetrunner.

== Promotion ==
=== Interviews ===
On August 3, 2013 Fat Joe appeared on the Power 105 Breakfast Club and spoke about ending the beef with 50 Cent amongst other things. He also appeared on 106 & Park on August 6, 2013 mainly to promote his Love Me Long time single but also spoke briefly about Darkside III. On August 9, 2013 he was interviewed on MTV News and spoke exclusively about Darkside Vol. 3 and reuniting with old friend Diamond D who was responsible for Joe joining the 1990s hip hop group Diggin' in the Crates.

=== Singles ===
"Angel Sings 2" was the first song released off the mixtape on December 20, 2012

The first official single from Darkside III, "Your Honor" featuring Action Bronson and produced by DJ Premier, was premiered on SiriusXM's Hip-Hop Nation on August 23, 2013 and released shortly after.

=== Videos ===
On the day of the mixtape release, a video for the first song on Darkside III was released on WorldStarHipHop.

== Critical reception ==
Darkside III was met with generally positive reviews from music critics. HipHopDX called it "EP-worthy" saying, "As legendary and respected as Fat Joe has become as an emcee through years of gaining stock in the game, he also attempts mightily to paint an environment that darts and dashes between decadence and sophistication. At times he succeeds, and at others he unwittingly falters, but the beats never let him down."

== Track listing ==
#	Title	Featured guest(s)	Producer	Length
1	"Darkside III"	Cool & Dre	Streetrunner	2:31
2	"Madison Squares"		Sap and Cool & Dre	2:32
3	"MGM Grand"		Streetrunner	2:56
4	"Pain"		iLLA	1:59
5	"Your Honor"	Action Bronson	DJ Premier	3:23
6	"9th Wonder"		9th Wonder	2:24
7	"Cypher"	Nick Shades	Diamond D	2:40
8	"Grimy in The Early 90s"		Illa Da Producer	2:08
9	"Bass"	Nick Shades	Cool and Dre	2:41
10	"Angel Sings 2"		Young Hype	3:28
