= Throwback (song) =

Song by Usher

from the album Confessions
- Released: 2004
- Genre: R&B
- Length: 4:46
- Label: Arista
- Songwriters: Richard Butler; Lamont Dozier; Brian Holland; Edward Holland; Justin Smith; Patrick Smith; Richard Wylie
- Producer: Just Blaze

"Throwback" is a song by American recording artist Usher, taken from his fourth studio album, Confessions (2004). It was written by Rico Love, Patrick "J. Que" Smith, and Just Blaze, while production was handled by the latter. "Throwback" is influenced by 1970s funk and rock music. An R&B and soul song, it is built on a hip hop and jazzy beat, and samples Dionne Warwick's song "You're Gonna Need Me", written by Holland–Dozier–Holland.

== Writing and production ==
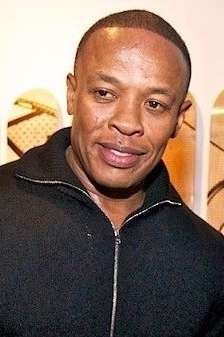
"Throwback" was initially intended for Dr. Dre's unreleased Detox album.

"Throwback" was composed by Just Blaze, Patrick "J. Que" Smith, and Rico Love. Blaze initially produced the song for Dr. Dre's unreleased Detox, which was expected to be his final album. With Dre announcing his retirement from recording, Blaze suggested they create an "exit record" which would have left Dre's fans yearning for a comeback, prompting him to build a track around a sample of Dionne Warwick's song "You're Gonna Need Me" from her 1973 album Just Being Myself, which includes the lyrics 'You're going to want me back'. In 2003, Blaze and songwriter Jon B were consulted to work with singer Usher on his fourth studio album. However, creative differences regarding the sound of their songs resulted in reportedly uninspired collaborations, and while the pair came up with several ideas "nothing really panned out".

As it became apparent that Detox would not materialize due to Dre's shifting commitments, Blaze decided to give the record to Usher, who was looking for a hip hop track to record. The material was left unused at first, and it was not until late into the album's production that Usher's team approached Blaze again to resume work on "Throwback". In the studio, he was joined by Smith and Love, who had one day to finish the song. "Throwback" marked the first major placement from Love, who came on board to finalize the lyrics of the song. With the hook ('You're gonna want me back') already set and Usher going through a very public breakup with TLC member Rozonda "Chilli" Thomas in late 2003, Love felt the "direction of the song was kind of obvious" when he sat down to pen additional lyrics for "Throwback".

Rapper Jay-Z was originally supposed to appear on the song, but scheduling conflicts prevented him from recording in time to meet the mastering deadline of Confessions. Next, rapper Jadakiss, who was putting finishing touches on his second album Kiss of Death at that time, was approached,. He also declined due to scheduling conflicts. Following the album's release, Jadakiss admitted in an interview with New York City radio station WQHT that he had "slept on it". Soon after, the rapper recorded vocals for a remix version, which he later sent Usher and his team. His version was included on the re-issue of Confessions, released in October 2004.

== Critical reception ==
Andy Kellman of Allmusic felt that "Throwback" sounds "like it was made for the sole purpose of trailing Alicia Keys's "You Don't Know My Name." Like the latter's song, it's "sensitively treated soul sample provides a nostalgic tint that complements the wistful, regret-filled tone of the lyrics."

== Charts ==
Weekly chart performance for "Throwback "
Chart (2005)	Peak position
US Bubbling Under Hot 100 (Billboard)	14
US Hot R&B/Hip-Hop Songs (Billboard)	36
US R&B/Hip-Hop Airplay (Billboard)	35
