= Turn the Lights On (album) =

2015 album by Rico Love

TTLO

Studio album by Rico Love
- Released: May 18, 2015
- Recorded: 2014–2015
- Genres: R&B; hip hop; pop
- Length: 47:17
- Labels: Division 1; Interscope
- Producers: Rico Love (also exec.); MADE (exec.); Benny Blanco; Danja; Diego Ave; DJ Dahi; DtownThaGreat; Earl & E; Jake One; Jim Jonsin; FNZ; Jack Splash; Robopop; Tiago Carvalho

Rico Love chronology
| Discrete Luxury (2013) | TTLO (2015) |

Singles from Turn the Lights On
- 1. "Somebody Else" Released: December 9, 2014

Turn the Lights On (also known under the acronym TTLO) is the debut studio album by American singer, rapper and record producer Rico Love. It was released on May 18, 2015, by Division 1 and Interscope. The production on the album was handled primarily by Love, Danja, Jim Jonson, Jack Splash, DJ Dahi and his own orchestra, TTLO.

== Background ==
Starting his career as a rapper signed to Usher's short-lived record label US Records, he began recording a studio album, which was later shelved. Love, being a successful songwriter and producer is stepping to the forefront as an artist. Love got his start in the writing songs like “Throwback” and “Seduction” on Usher's 2004 Grammy Award-winning album, Confessions. Love continued success features Usher's "There Goes My Baby", "Hey Daddy (Daddy's Home)" and "Dive", Nelly's "Just a Dream" and "Gone", Beyoncé's "Sweet Dreams", and Kelly Rowland's "Motivation".

== Track listing ==
Credits adapted from the album's liner notes.

Turn the Lights On
| No. | Title | Writer(s) | Producer(s) | Length |
|---|---|---|---|---|
| 1. | "TTLO" | Rico Love; Earl Hood; Eric Goudy II; Dwayne Nesmith; Diego Avendaño; Thurston McCrea | Rico Love; Earl & E; DtownThaGreat; Diego Ave | 3:34 |
| 2. | "Bad Attitude" | Love; Dacoury Natche; Corey Woods; Armani Caesar; Adrian Younge; William Hart | DJ Dahi; Love^{[a]} | 4:08 |
| 3. | "Trifling" | Love; Floyd Hills; Marcella Araica; McCrea | Danja; Love | 4:24 |
| 4. | "Ride" | Love; Hills; Araica; McCrea | Danja | 3:10 |
| 5. | "For the Kids" | Love; James Scheffer; Michael Mule; Isaac De Boni; Nikolas Marzouca; McCrea | Jim Jonsin; FNZ; Love | 3:10 |
| 6. | "The Affair" | Love; Scheffer; Mule; De Boni; Alfred Darlington; Amir Yaghmai | Jim Jonsin; FNZ; Love | 3:48 |
| 7. | "Days Go By" | Love; Hills; Araica; McCrea | Danja | 5:19 |
| 8. | "Somebody Else" | Love; Jacob Dutton; Benjamin Levin; Dan Omelio; Matt Corby | Benny Blanco; Robopop; Jake One | 4:44 |
| 9. | "Run From Me" | Love; Jack Splash; McCrea | Jack Splash | 2:30 |
| 10. | "Happy Birthday" | Love; Hood; Goudy II; Nesmith; Avendaño; McCrea | Love; Earl & E; DtownThaGreat | 3:55 |
| 11. | "Amsterdam" | Love; Hood; Goudy II; Nesmith; Avendaño; McCrea | Love; Earl & E; DtownThaGreat | 4:08 |
| 12. | "The Proposal" | Love; Natche; Tiago Carvalho; McCrea | DJ Dahi; Tiago Carvalho | 3:49 |

Notes

- ^{^[a]} signifies an additional producer.
- "TTLO" features additional vocals from Waka Flocka Flame
- "Bad Attitude" features additional vocals from Raekwon, Armani Caesar and Dyrana Mcintosh
- "Somebody Else" features additional vocals from Tiara Thomas and Ginette Claudette
- "Happy Birthday" features additional vocals from Salome Berrebi

Sample credits

- "Bad Attitude" contains excerpts from "Stop and Look (And You Have Found Love)", written by Adrian Younge and William Hart and performed by The Delfonics
- "The Affair" contains excerpts from "Onward", written by Alfred Darlington and Amir Yaghmai and performed by Daedelus
- "Somebody Else" contains portions of "Brother", written by Matt Corby

== Credits and personnel ==
- Primary Artist - Rico Love
- Executive Producer - Rico Love
- Production - Jim Jonsin, Rico Love, Danja, DJ Dahi, Benny Blanco
- Composers – Adrian Younge, Alfred Darlington, Amir Yaghmai, Armani Caesar, Benjamin Levin, Corey Woods, Dacoity Natche, Dan Omelio, Diego Ave, Dwayne Nesmith, Earl Hood, Eric Goudy II, Flloyd Nataniel Hills, Isaac de Boni, Jack Splash Jacob Dutton, James Scheffer, Marceilia Araica, Matt Corby, Michael Mule, Nokolas Marzouca, Rico Love, Thurston McCrea, Tiago Carvalho, William Hurt.
- Featured Artist - Raekwon, Armani Caesar
- A&R - Shawn Suggs, Alicia Caesar
