= If It Ain't About Money =

Single by Fat Joe featuring Trey Songz

from the album The Darkside Vol. 1
- Released: June 30, 2010
- Recorded: 2009–2010
- Genre: East Coast hip-hop, R&B
- Length: 3:53
- Label: E1, Terror Squad
- Songwriters: Tremaine Neverson, Joseph Cartegena, Marcello Valenzano, Andre Christopher Lyon, August Rigo, Eddie Montilla
- Producer: Cool and Dre

Fat Joe singles chronology
"(Ha Ha) Slow Down" (2010)	"If It Ain't About Money" (2010)	"Welcome to My Hood (Remix)" (2011)

Trey Songz singles chronology
"Already Taken" (2010)	"If It Ain't About Money" (2010)	"Bottoms Up" (2010)

"If It Ain't About Money" is a song by American rapper Fat Joe, released by Terror Squad Entertainment and Entertainment One on June 30, 2010 as the second single from his tenth studio album, The Darkside Vol. 1 (2010). It features R&B singer Trey Songz and was produced by Joe's frequent producers, Cool & Dre.

On May 22, 2010, Cool & Dre announced on Twitter that "If It Ain't About Money" would debut on Funkmaster Flex's radio show on May 24. In the tweet, a link to a video was provided where Fat Joe confirmed the news while a portion of the song was heard in the background.

== Music video ==
The video, which was directed by Parris and stars Fat Joe and Trey Songz with cameo appearances by Waka Flocka Flame, Cool & Dre and DJ Khaled, was premiered on BET's 106 & Park on July 3, 2010

== Charts ==
Chart (2010)	Peak position
German Black Charts	9
US Hot R&B/Hip-Hop Songs (Billboard)	57
US Hot Rap Songs (Billboard)	25
