= Jealous Ones Still Envy 2 (J.O.S.E. 2) =

Studio album by Fat Joe
- Released: October 6, 2009
- Genre: Hip hop
- Length: 47:54
- Label: TS
- Producer: Rico Love and Stanley; Ron Browz; The Inkredibles; Eric Hudson; T-Weed; Andrews "Drew" Correa; Jim Jonsin; DJ J-Buttah; Laurent "Slick" Cohen; DJ Infamous; Schife & OhZee

Fat Joe chronology
The Elephant in the Room (2008)	Jealous Ones Still Envy 2 (J.O.S.E. 2) (2009)	The Darkside Vol. 1 (2010)

Singles from Jealous Ones Still Envy 2
- 1. "One" Released: February 24, 2009; 2. "Aloha" Released: July 29, 2009

Jealous Ones Still Envy 2 (J.O.S.E. 2) is the ninth solo studio album by American rapper Fat Joe, and is a sequel to his platinum-selling album Jealous Ones Still Envy (2001). It is also the third album in his Jealous One's Envy series. After several delays, the album was released on October 6, 2009. The album's production was done by Rico Love, Ron Browz, the Inkredibles, Eric Hudson, Jim Jonsin and DJ Infamous, and features guest contributions from rappers Lil Wayne, Lil' Kim, Raekwon, Rico Love, T.A. and Swizz Beatz and R&B singers Akon, T-Pain and Pleasure P.

The album garnered a mixed reception from critics who felt it borrowed too much from current hip-hop trends to regain both commercial success and relevancy for Joe. Jealous Ones Still Envy 2 debuted and peaked at number 73 on the US Billboard 200 and spawned two singles: "One" and "Aloha".

== Background ==
The album release was delayed several times before Joe announced on his Twitter feed that the album would be released on October 6. Fat Joe explained to XXL on May 22 that he delayed the album due to a lack of promotion. The day of the label's announcement, Fat Joe held a listening party for the album. Prior to the release of the album on October 6, rival 50 Cent, issued a number of viral videos poking fun at the album as it was about to be released. Fat Joe replied with messages via his Twitter page, saying; "50 is sick that my album is so hot. That real music! Not that wack stuff him and his clowns are making."

== Singles ==
The first single was "One" featuring Akon, Fat Joe commented that his marriage inspired this song. "One" peaked at number 74 on the US Billboard Hot R&B/Hip-Hop Songs chart. The second single is "Aloha" featuring Pleasure P and Rico Love.

== Critical reception ==
Professional ratings
Review scores
Source	Rating
AllMusic	3/5 stars
Billboard	4/5 stars
HipHopDX	2.5/5 stars
RapReviews	6/10
XXL	3/5 stars

Jealous Ones Still Envy 2 received mixed reviews from music critics who found Joe trying too hard to recapture J.O.S.E.'s commercial success while appealing to a younger hip-hop audience. Mariel Concepcion of Billboard praised the production for being energetic and versatile for Joe to rap over, saying that "the Bronx-bred rapper again proves that he's got a knack for infectious beats." Sean A. Malcolm of XXL said that despite some tracks feeling dull and monotonous, he praised Joe for maintaining his New York roots while mixing it with his newfound Miami influence through his performance, concluding that "Sequels rarely live up to the original, and J.O.S.E. 2 is no exception. But, in the end, with his string of hits, Fat Joe still remains one to envy." AllMusic's David Jeffries said that the album follows the same formula as J.O.S.E., noticing the tracks' high-end production and star-worthy featured artists saying, "The track list is right-sized and the rhymes are amusing the whole way through, making the title the only thing left to gripe about."

Steve 'Flash' Juon of RapReviews was mixed towards the album, noting that Joe goes back and forth delivering sub-standard lyrics over production that's commercially tasteful, saying that, "I suppose Joe can't be blamed for trying to stay trendy so he doesn't become irrelevant, but in working hard to combat his complacency he's gone the opposite direction and become the one thing no rapper should ever be - the old dude in the room everybody's snickering at because he thinks he's being cool when he's not." Andres Tardio of HipHopDX said that despite tracks like "Congratulations", "One" and "Joey Don't Do It" having eclectic production and sharp lyricism, the album falters with an overabundance of Auto-Tune over anonymous club tracks, saying that, "Though J.O.S.E. 2 shines when Joe is not chasing formulaic records, the cookie cutter style he often uses makes this album lose its impact."

In 2012, Vibe added the album in its list of twelve rap album sequels that should have never happened. Vibe editor Chris Yuscavage found it inferior to Joe's 2001 commercial breakthrough saying, "With J.O.S.E. 2, he tried to emulate that feeling by selecting a host of commercially-viable producers (Jim Jonsin, Rico Love and–gulp–Ron Browz, included) and failed miserably by deviating away from his core fan base. J.O.S.E. 2 was too much of a bad thing."

== Commercial performance ==
Jealous Ones Still Envy 2 (J.O.S.E. 2) debuted at number 73 on the US Billboard 200 chart, selling 8,300 copies in its first week. The album ended up leaving the chart the following week. The album also debuted at number nine on the US Top R&B/Hip-Hop Albums chart, becoming Joe's seventh top-ten album on this chart. By June 2010, the album had sold 20,000 copies in the United States.

== Track listing ==
No.	Title	Producer(s)	Length
1.	"Winding on Me" (featuring Lil Wayne and Ron Browz)	Ron Browz	4:01
2.	"Joey Don't Do It"	DJ Infamous	2:18
3.	"One" (featuring Akon)	The Inkredibles	3:52
4.	"Aloha" (featuring Pleasure P and Rico Love)	Rico Love; Earl & E	3:57
5.	"Put Ya in Da Game" (featuring T-Pain and OZ)	Schife & OhZee	4:22
6.	"Congratulations" (featuring Rico Love and TA)	Eric Hudson	4:37
7.	"Porn Star" (featuring Lil' Kim)	Jim Jonsin	3:56
8.	"Cupcake" (featuring Benisour)	Schife & OhZee	4:45
9.	"Ice Cream" (featuring Raekwon and TA)	T-Weed	4:34
10.	"Okay Okay"	Andrews "Drew" Correa; G-Boi	4:02
11.	"Blackout" (featuring Swizz Beatz and Rob Cash of KAR)	DJ J-Buttah	3:42
12.	"Music" (featuring Cherlise)	DJ Infamous; Laurent "Slick" Cohen	4:24

== Personnel ==
Credits for Jealous Ones Still Envy 2 (J.O.S.E. 2) adapted from AllMusic.

- Angela Aponte – engineer
- Miguel Angel Mendoza Bermudez – assistant, mixing assistant
- Ron Browz – audio production
- Eric Hudson – instrumentation
- The Inkredibles – audio production
- Jim Jonsin – audio production
- Sat-Kartar Kaur Khalsa – assistant, mixing assistant
- Rico Love – executive producer
- Fabian Marasciullo – mixing
- Jason Martin – engineer
- Vlado Meller – mastering
- Will Ragland – art direction
- Raw Uncut – audio production
- Luis Salazar – guitar
- Adrian "Drop" Santalla – engineer
- Schife – audio production
- Armando Soler – maracas
- The Streetrunnerz – audio production
- James M. Wisner – engineer, vocal engineer
- Oscar Zayas – engineer

== Charts ==
Chart (2009)	Peak position
US Billboard 200	73
US Top R&B/Hip-Hop Albums (Billboard)	9
