= Rayne Storm =

American rapper

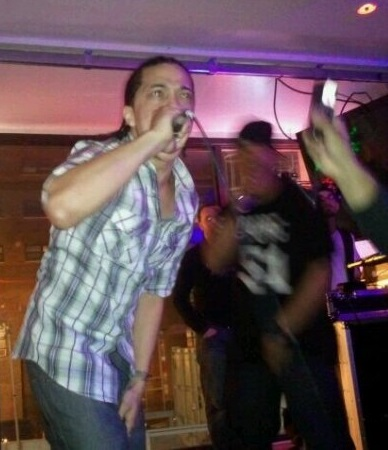
- Rayne Storm Live At The VSOP Party

Background information
- Born: Adi Ladson; Harlem, Manhattan, New York City, New York, US.
- Genre: Hip hop
- Occupations: Rapper, Producer
- Works: Supreme EP, Uptown Baby, Summer In The City EP, Audiocity, Audiocity II, Storms Coming EP, Audiocity II: The Remixes, Audiocity III,
- Years active: 2006–present
- Label: Monopolyhouse
- Website: http://www.raynestorm.com

Adi Ladson better known by his stage name Rayne Storm, is an American rapper and producer from Harlem, New York. He initially gained attention in 2006 with the release of his first mixtape Storms Coming. Since his debut on Storms Coming, Rayne has founded the independent label Monopolyhouse, released several remixes to chart-topping or viral songs and has made a number of guest appearances. On January 1, 2016, Rayne released his EP titled Supreme with features from Tash (rapper) of Tha Alkaholiks, DecadeZ, L.I.V.E.Wire, iLL Drew, Profane Remy, Black Silver, Perelini and Harlem Hitman. Supreme EP was re-released in 2018 with "All Black (Black Panther Remix)" inspired by the Marvel movie Black Panther as well as a new song "Work (Who Gettin' It)" and intro/outro skits.

== Early life ==
Rayne, who is of African American and Native American descent, was raised in Harlem and spent most of his childhood growing up in New York City. He began writing rhymes while a sophomore in high school after a competition with friends. As a senior, Rayne became a television and radio show host for Teen Talk Productions. As a host of the television show, he won a PASS Award for an episode about the September 11 attacks. As a radio show host he interviewed "World Hop" artist Don Yute and 90s R&B singer Horace Brown. After graduating Rayne joined Art Start's Hip-Hop Project, which collaborated with Russell Simmons and others, leading to the documentary The Hip Hop Project, executive produced by Bruce Willis and Queen Latifah. Rayne later spent a few years recording with the independent label Ravenel Records before pursuing a career as an independent artist and producer.

== Career ==
In 2006, Rayne released his first mixtape Storms Coming which gained him a small buzz and recognition. He later released The Unkrowned King (2008), Storms Coming TWS Edition (2010) and Supreme: The Mixtape (Dec 2015). On January 1, 2016, he released his first official EP, Supreme, which was re-released in 2018. The first "Remixes" mixtape was released in 2017 with next 2 installments coming back to back in October and November 2018. "Remixes IV" was released in March 2019 and the next installment, "Remixes V" on October 17, 2020. "The Classic Collection" is a 3 mixtape compilation of freestyles, remixes and features released individually between June and July 2018. On December 7, 2020, Rayne released his long-awaited debut album Uptown Baby, which topped the iTunes charts in Denmark at #41 in Hip-Hop/Rap with the single "Yada Yada" ft. Pudgee Tha Phat Bastard & Kazzy Raxx. The sequel to his first mixtape, Storms Coming II was released on April 3, 2021.

Rayne's next EP "Summer In The City" was released on Sept 21, 2021, and featured a music video for the title track. The song "Prolly Me" ft. DecadeZ reached #81 on Planet Radio in Germany. Rayne Storm's sophomore album "AudioCity" is his most successful to date gaining over 150,000 Spotify streams in its first year of release. "AudioCity" debuted on February 22, 2022, and contained high profile features such as DMC, Sticky Fingaz & Canibus. The album topped the iTunes charts in Bahrain (#4 in Hip-Hop and #21 in All Genres) with the single "Revenge" ft. Jarren Benton & Kony Brooks and South Africa (#35 in Hip-Hop) with "Dive Bar" ft. Killah Priest and KingFsorrow. "Remixes 6" was released on December 22, 2022, and included original songs such as "Armageddon" ft. Killah Priest & KingFsorrow, "Verzuz (Run This Shit)" and "Just Gettin' Warm". On Nov 10, 2023, Rayne released his latest album, "Audiocity II" with major features from Cam'ron, Benny The Butcher, Jadakiss and others.

== Artistry ==
Rayne is best known for his cadence, flow and unique production style. His rap influences include Big L, Jay Z, The Lox (Styles P, Jadakiss & Sheek Louch), Mobb Deep (Prodigy & Havoc), Nas, The Notorious B.I.G. & Tupac. He names producers Dr. Dre, Pharrell Williams, DJ Premier, Kanye West, Timbaland, Ryan Leslie & Frank Zappa as inspiration for his production.

== Discography ==
=== Mixtapes ===
| Title | Released |
|---|---|
| Remixes X | TBD |
| Remixes 9 | 2026 |
| Remixes 8 | 2025 |
| Remixes 7 | 2024 |
| Remixes 6 | 2022 |
| Storms Coming II | 2021 |
| Remixes V | 2020 |
| Remixes IV | 2019 |
| Remixes III | 2018 |
| Remixes II | 2018 |
| Features: The Classic Collection | 2018 |
| Remixes: The Classic Collection | 2018 |
| Freestyles: The Classic Collection | 2018 |
| Remixes | 2017 |
| Supreme: The Mixtape | 2015 |
| Storms Coming: TWS Edition | 2010 |
| The Unkrowned King | 2008 |
| Storms Coming | 2006 |

=== Albums ===
| Title | Released |
|---|---|
| Audiocity IV | TBD |
| Audiocity III | March 13, 2026 |
| Audiocity II | November 10, 2023 |
| Audiocity | February 22, 2022 |
| Uptown Baby | December 7, 2020 |

=== EP's ===
| Title | Released |
|---|---|
| Storms Coming EP | May 17, 2024 |
| Summer In The City EP | September 21, 2021 |
| Supreme (EP) (Re-Release) | August 22, 2018 |
| Supreme (EP) | January 1, 2016 |

=== Compilations ===
| Title | Released |
|---|---|
| Audiocity II: The Remixes | September 27, 2024 |
| No Threats: The Uptown Remixes | September 20, 2024 |
| Boom: The Sugar Hill Remixes | July 23, 2024 |
| All Black (All Versions) | August 8, 2018 |

=== Guest appearances ===
List of guest appearances, with other performing artists, showing year released and album name
| Title | Year | Other artist(s) | Album |
|---|---|---|---|
| "Broadway" | 2025 | Rose Jay | Broadway (Single) |
| "Harlem Heat" | 2025 | Dizzy $padez | #Hustlemania |
| "Blunts & Apologies" | 2024 | Rose Jay | Blunts & Apologies (Single) |
| "Pretend" | 2022 | DecadeZ | Ice Cold |
| "Monopoly (Full House)" | 2022 | Dizzy $padez, Qing Screw Face | #AccessHollywood |
| "You Don't Know" | 2022 | S-Type, Dayo | You Don't Know (Single) |
| "Metamorphosis" | 2021 | KingFsorrow | The Hellstrym Chronicle |
| "Black Widow Luv" | 2021 | KingFsorrow | The Hellstrym Chronicle |
| "Unlinkable" | 2021 | Rose Jay | Unlinkable (Single) |
| "Money Heist" | 2021 | Dizzy $padez, Qing Screw Face, Kxng Chxno | #DegreeOfDifficulty |
| "Goonies" | 2021 | Dizzy $padez, Soulebrity, Big Dawg K | #DegreeOfDifficulty |
| "I'll Kill Em" | 2020 | Millie Wong, Dezaihr | I'll Kill Em (Single) |
| "Pilot" | 2020 | Loudpack Dash | Pilot (Single) |
| "Unpretty" | 2020 | Rose Jay | Unpretty (Single) |
| "Groovy" | 2020 | Millie Wong | Groovy (Single) |
| "We Don't Play" | 2019 | Soulebrity | We Don't Play (Single) |
| "Been Dope" | 2019 | Path P | Revolution & Legacy Vol. 2 |
| "My Story (Remix)" | 2018 | Phoenixx, Gully Got Em | The Stu Vol. 2 |
| "Downfall" | 2018 | Kazzy Raxx, Nick Notez | Raskal |
| "On Me" | 2017 | John Frank, Fr33 Tha Sinner, Arson360 | On Me (Single) |
| "The Favorite" | 2017 | 3ckiss | The Favorite (Single) |

=== Singles ===
List of singles, with other performing artists, showing year released and single name
| Title | Year | Featured artist(s) |
|---|---|---|
| "Turn It Up (Higher)" | 2026 | The Game |
| "Hussle" | 2026 | Nipsey Hussle, Verse Akalp |
| "Come Real" | 2026 | Drake |
| "Off That (10-4)" | 2026 | Nicki Minaj |
| "I'm Alive" | 2026 | Nas |
| "Your Love" | 2026 | T.I. |
| "Old Ye" | 2026 | Kanye West |
| "Crazy" | 2026 | Eminem, Dizzy $padez, Verse Akalp |
| "Revenge II" | 2026 | Jarren Benton |
| "DTA" | 2026 | Boosie Badazz, Verse Akalp |
| "Crash Out (Crashed Out Remix)" | 2026 | Lil Wayne, Nola Layne |
| "Low" | 2026 | Drake |
| "Crash Out (Chilled Out Remix)" | 2026 | Lil Wayne, Nola Layne |
| " Weather" | 2026 | |
| "KABOOM!" | 2026 | Lil Flip, Kony Brooks, Mankind Music Academy, Scribe The Verbalist, Loudpack Dash, D-Vour |
| "Stick Em Up" | 2025 | Hussein Fatal |
| "Get Money Year" | 2025 | Desiigner |
| "TTT" | 2025 | Lil Yachty |
| "All On Me" | 2025 | Mac Dre |
| "Do What I Do" | 2025 | DMX |
| "Uptown Getdown" | 2025 | Big Pun, Kony Brooks |
| "Soft Shxt" | 2025 | Sean Price, Dizzy $padez |
| "Crash Out" | 2024 | Lil Wayne, Nola Layne |
| "No Threats" | 2024 | Jim Jones, Loudpack Dash |
| "Late Night With The Devil" | 2024 | Bizarre, D-Vour |
| "Boom (Edgecombe Remix)" | 2024 | Juelz Santana |
| "Boom (St Nicholas Remix)" | 2024 | Juelz Santana |
| "Boom (Riverside Remix)" | 2024 | Juelz Santana |
| "Boom (Broadway Remix)" | 2024 | Juelz Santana |
| "Boom (Amsterdam Remix)" | 2024 | Juelz Santana |
| "Pockets Hurtin' (Legion Beats Remix)" | 2024 | Rick Ross, Giovonni Pratt, Verse Akalp |
| "Pockets Hurtin' (Anno Domini Remix)" | 2024 | Rick Ross, Giovonni Pratt, Verse Akalp |
| "Boom" | 2024 | Juelz Santana |
| "Up Up Away" | 2024 | Roy Dean, Scribe The Verbalist |
| "Scorchers" | 2024 | Mankind Music Academy |
| "Revolution" | 2024 | Path P |
| " No Tomorrow" | 2024 | Sunny Lucas, Streatz Merdah |
| "Much More" | 2024 | Loudpack Dash |
| "Gettin' Bizzy" | 2024 | |
| "Audacity (Unscrewed Version)" | 2024 | |
| "Beat It (Remix)" | 2024 | Stunna 4 Vegas |
| "Dead Body (Westside Remix)" | 2023 | iLL Drew, Kurupt |
| "Dead Body (Eastside Remix)" | 2023 | iLL Drew, Kurupt |
| "Outside (Oskar Mike Remix)" | 2023 | Jadakiss, Kony Brooks, Loudpack Dash |
| "Outside (Sentury Status Remix)" | 2023 | Jadakiss, Kony Brooks, Loudpack Dash |
| "Addiction" | 2023 | Project Pat, Perelini |
| "Pockets Hurtin'" | 2023 | Rick Ross, Giovanni Pratt, Verse Akalp |
| "Audacity" | 2023 | |
| "No Fear" | 2023 | Young Buck, Dizzy $padez |
| "Dead Body" | 2023 | iLL Drew, Kurupt |
| "Rambo" | 2023 | Avery Storm |
| "Even If It Rains (Remix)" | 2023 | Benny The Butcher |
| "Even If It Rains" | 2023 | Benny The Butcher |
| "Rap Rap" | 2023 | Planet Asia, G.Fisher |
| "Beat It" | 2023 | Stunna 4 Vegas |
| "Jump (2Deep Remix)" | 2023 | Cam'ron |
| "Outside" | 2023 | Jadakiss, Kony Brooks, Loudpack Dash |
| "Jump (Scarebeatz Remix)" | 2023 | Cam'ron |
| "Hard (Remix)" | 2023 | Tragedy Khadafi, KnowItAll |
| "Hard" | 2023 | Tragedy Khadafi, KnowItAll |
| "Greenberry" | 2023 | Tragedy Khadafi |
| "Is It Real?" | 2023 | Ras Kass, Kazzy Raxx |
| "KKK" | 2023 | Yukmouth |
| "Let It Fly" | 2023 | Krizz Kaliko |
| "Jump" | 2023 | Cam'ron |
| "Up 2 God" | 2022 | |
| "Chill" | 2022 | Kazzy Raxx, Loudpack Dash, DecadeZ |
| "Kxng Talk" | 2022 | KXNG Crooked, Kxng Chxno |
| "Forex" | 2022 | Loudpack Dash, Soulebrity |
| "On My Own" | 2022 | |
| "Flashlight" | 2022 | Kony Brooks |
| "Dive Bar" | 2022 | Killah Priest, KingFsorrow |
| "Revenge" | 2022 | Jarren Benton, Kony Brooks |
| "Hip Hop Love" | 2022 | Cappadonna |
| "Doin' A Lot" | 2022 | Dizzy $padez |
| "Audiocity" | 2022 | |
| "Alone" | 2022 | Big Twins |
| "All Along" | 2022 | Swifty McVay |
| "Old School New School" | 2021 | DMC |
| "La La La" | 2021 | Sticky Fingaz |
| "TKO" | 2021 | Canibus |
| "Ready To Live" | 2021 | HËS |
| "Links" | 2021 | Dizzy $padez |
| "Treesh" | 2021 | iLeeyah Breeze |
| "I Got It" | 2021 | Kony Brooks, Dizzy $padez |
| "Blicky Bop" | 2021 | |
| "Body By The Summer" | 2021 | Dizzy $padez |
| "Summer In The City" | 2021 | Qing Screw Face |
| "Armageddon" | 2021 | Killah Priest, KingFsorrow |
| "Verzuz (Run This Shit)" | 2021 | |
| "Prolly Me" | 2021 | DecadeZ |
| "Grow" | 2021 | |
| "Dirty 30" | 2021 | |
| "Dogecoin (Run It Up)" | 2021 | |
| "Go Off" | 2020 | Mankind Music Academy |
| "Whoop" | 2020 | Soulebrity |
| "Stir It (Wok)" | 2020 | Buddha718, Soulebrity |
| "1000Naire" | 2020 | Dizzy $padez |
| "Murda" | 2020 | Verse Akalp, Mickey Factz |
| "Give It 2 U" | 2020 | Millie Wong |
| "Lookin' At Me" | 2020 | DecadeZ, Kony Brooks, Dxnny Dolphin, Millie Wong |
| "Cuttin' Up" | 2020 | Kelly Grinz |
| "Automatic (Battle Remix)" | 2020 | Soulebrity |
| "Automatic" | 2020 | Soulebrity |
| "Off My Corna" | 2020 | Loudpack Dash |
| "Latifah" | 2020 | Phoenixx |
| "Emotions" | 2020 | |
| "Hotbox Anthem" | 2020 | |
| "B.I.G. Boy" | 2020 | Dizzy $padez, Buck Madoff |
| "City In The Sky" | 2020 | McGruff, Stan Spit, Phoenixx |
| "Reminisce" | 2019 | Harlem Hitman, Perelini |
| "YNMM" | 2019 | Loudpack Dash |
| "Yada Yada" | 2019 | Pudgee Tha Phat Bastard, Kazzy Raxx |
| "Imagination" | 2019 | RoseJay |
| "All I Wanna Know" | 2019 | Kazzy Raxx, Benji, MDolla The Don |
| "Pull" | 2019 | |
| "Kill It" | 2019 | Luch Love |
| "Gettin' Right" | 2019 | Fever GT |
| "Circuits" | 2018 | L.I.V.E.Wire, DecadeZ |
| "Crazyouttacontrol" | 2018 | |
| "Work (Who Gettin' It)" | 2018 | |
| "All Black (Black Panther Remix)" | 2018 | |
| "All Black (DubTrap Remix)" | 2016 | |
| "West Coast Love" | 2016 | iLL Drew, Tash, Profane Remy, Black Silver |
| "All Black" | 2016 | |
| "Champagne" | 2013 | Perelini |
