= One (Fat Joe song) =

Single by Fat Joe

from the album Jealous Ones Still Envy 2 (J.O.S.E. 2)

"One" is the first single from rapper Fat Joe's album Jealous Ones Still Envy 2 (J.O.S.E. 2).

== Background ==
"One" was released as the first single from Fat Joe's album J.O.S.E. 2. Fat Joe has stated the song was inspired by his marriage.

== Charts ==
Chart (2009)	Peak position
US Hot R&B/Hip-Hop Songs (Billboard)	74
