= Confessions (Usher album) =

Studio album by Usher
- Released: March 23, 2004
- Recorded: 2003–2004
- Studios: Baseline (New York City, New York); Brandon's Way (Los Angeles, California); Circle House (Miami, Florida); Doppler (Atlanta, Georgia); Flyte Tyme West (Santa Monica, California); Hitland (Atlanta, Georgia); Larabee North (North Hollywood, California); Larrabee Sound West (West Hollywood, California); Record One (Los Angeles, California); Right Track (New York City, New York); Rondor (Los Angeles, California); Sony (New York City, New York); Southside (Atlanta, Georgia); The Village (Los Angeles, California); Zac Digital (Atlanta, Georgia)
- Genre: R&B
- Length: 60:30; 77:22 (special edition)
- Label: Arista
- Producers: Jermaine Dupri; Destro Music; Lil' Jon; Rich Harrison; Jimmy Jam and Terry Lewis; Robin Thicke; Bryan-Michael Cox; Just Blaze; Dre & Vidal; Bobby Ross Avila; James "Big Jim" Wright

Usher chronology
8701 (2001)	Confessions (2004)	Here I Stand (2008)

Singles from Confessions
- 1. "Yeah!" Released: January 27, 2004; 2. "Burn" Released: March 21, 2004; 3. "Confessions Part II" Released: June 1, 2004; 4. "Caught Up" Released: January 3, 2005

Special edition cover

Singles from Confessions (Special Edition)
- 1. "My Boo" Released: August 29, 2004

Confessions is the fourth studio album by American singer Usher. It was released on March 23, 2004, by Arista Records. Recording sessions for the album took place from 2003 to 2004, with its production on the album being handled by his longtime collaborator Jermaine Dupri, along with Jimmy Jam and Terry Lewis and Lil Jon, among others. Primarily an R&B album, Confessions showcases Usher as a crooner through a mixture of ballads and up-tempos, incorporating musical genres of dance-pop, hip-hop, and crunk. The album's themes generated controversy about Usher's personal relationships. However, the album's primary producer Jermaine Dupri claimed the album reflects Dupri's own personal story.

In the United States, the album sold 1.1 million copies in its first week. To boost sales amid threats of bootlegging, a special edition was released which included the single "My Boo" (a duet with Alicia Keys). Confessions earned Usher various awards, including the Grammy Award for Best Contemporary R&B Album. According to Billboard, it is the second-best selling album of the 2000s decade in the United States, behind NSYNC's No Strings Attached. With over eight million copies sold in 2004, the album was viewed as a sign of recovering album sales in the United States, following three years of decline. It was also exemplary of urban music's commercial peak and dominance of the Billboard charts in 2004.

Confessions has been certified fourteen-times platinum by the Recording Industry Association of America (RIAA). As of 2006, the album has sold over 10.3 million copies in the US and over 15 million copies worldwide, making it the best-selling R&B album of the 21st century. Usher would also promote it with the Truth Tour the same year as the album's release, marking his first international tour. Confessions' concept, production and Usher's vocal delivery received acclaim since upon its release, and in 2020 the album was ranked number 432 on Rolling Stone's 500 Greatest Albums of All Time list.

== Background and recording ==
When he began recording Confessions in 2003, Usher claimed he did not want to work with any new producers. Production began between Usher and Jermaine Dupri, who produced his last two albums, My Way (1997) and 8701 (2001). In spite of his vision, Usher stated, "With this album I chose some new producers who I figured would definitely allow me to really articulate myself in a different way ... Every album you gotta grow. You gotta look for something different." Dupri also invited his frequent collaborator Bryan-Michael Cox. The album features productions by Jimmy Jam and Terry Lewis, Just Blaze, Usher's brother James Lackey, Dre and Vidal, among others.

When Usher felt that the album was completed, with forty recorded songs, he submitted the album to his record label, Arista. However, he and the company's then-president, L. A. Reid, who listened to the record, thought something was missing in it, sharing the sentiment "You know what, there's like one or two more records that we just gotta get." Usher was displeased with the decision; he felt returning to the studio was the hardest part and needed to re-motivate himself. He went on recording a few more tracks with help from fellow Atlantans Lil Jon and Ludacris. Eventually, the team was able to produce songs like "Red Light" and "Yeah!". He also recorded songs with P. Diddy and the Neptunes during one of those sessions, but those songs were not released.

== Composition ==
One of Usher's first steps in recording Confessions was deciding to reveal "his own little secrets". Friend and former A&R rep named Kawan "KP" Prather thought the album would let the public know Usher personally. Prather said, "The music has never been the question, but people tend to buy into the artist. The more they know about you, the more they feel like they're there with you." Primarily because of the album's personal content, Usher said that this is his chance to be real. He named the album Confessions because he felt it is his most personal record to date: "All of us have our Pandora's boxes or skeletons in our closets. I let a few of them out, you know. I've got a lot to say. I've got a lot of things and stuff built in me that I just want to let go of." He wrote more songs than he contributed to his previous album.

Several of the songs in this album were conceptually based on a situation. For instance, "Burn" was built around the winding down of Usher's two-year relationship with Rozonda "Chilli" Thomas from American R&B-Hip-hop girl group TLC. Dupri and Cox were talking and felt that there was a song in it, and started writing. Similarly, with the title track "Confessions Part II", they were conversing about an impregnated mistress, and its concept was written down. Usher recorded "Confessions Part II" during July 2003 recording sessions in New York City. When Usher sang the song's lyrics, the theme of cheating inspired him and Dupri to create two parts; "Confessions Part I" and "Confessions Part II". "Confessions Part I" can be heard at the beginning of the video for "Confessions Part II".

=== Music and style ===
"Confessions Part II"
The song is set in common time and has a moderate groove. Its lyrics centers on the narrator's confession about impregnating his mistress.

Confessions falls mainly in the R&B genre. Usher commented that he chose to work with collaborators who know "... how to interpret R&B from a jazz standpoint, an old school throwback standpoint, a new school point, a traditional classic standpoint ..." With producers and Usher set to produce such an album, however, other musical genres including hip-hop were incorporated. While he wanted to do R&B, Usher also wanted his fans to experience hip-hop at the same time: "I try to think outside the box." When Lil Jon came on the scene, crunk was introduced to the R&B-centered album, specifically on the Sean Garrett-penned song "Yeah!". Usher said, "'Yeah!' could be called the first consciously styled "crunk R&B" record." The album also includes various slow jams.

This record also introduces a new style for Usher, focusing on his voice and technique. Andre "Dre" Harris and Vidal Davis listened to 8701 and felt that "Usher really needs to sing hard and let people know his vocal ability". With efforts focused on the record to demonstrate his vocal ability to listeners, songs such as "Superstar" and "Follow Me" exhibited Usher in a type of "crooner mode". The ballad-oriented "Burn" also showcases his vocal aptitude.

Usher credits Eminem with the album's reputation of being transparent, and Bone Thugs-n-Harmony with the hip-hop sound of the album, stating in an interview with Sway:

I have Eminem to thank for that...well, in a time where I felt like music was in transition, and R&B specifically was in a place where it could go older, or it could kind of be what it was. Right? You had all these great, you know, artists that were either performers, dancers, singers, whatever...but I felt like there, the honesty. The honesty of hip-hop, and what Eminem was saying on his records, it motivated me. Like, yo if he could be that honest, you know through hip-hop - and there've been other stories, storytellers, but never quite as vivid as his. So I was like, we need to keep it real like Em. I wanna go all the way in, so lemme talk about the unspoken, the shit that people don't want to talk about and don't want to have to deal with. So, that's what Confessions kinda kicked in. And I got that Cleveland, because, you know with the Bone Thugs-n-Harmony, you know what I'm saying is to just understanding that the rhythm and the flip of it to make it be able to make it be at least, you know, hip-hop appropriate. You know what I'm saying? That's what it was. And that kinda recreated what I felt R&B was and what it is to day, in some ways.

== Release ==
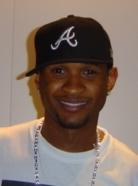
Usher on April 23, 2004.

Confessions was slated for release on November 6, 2003. However, due to marketing issues, the scheduled date was moved to March 23 of the following year. With several songs recorded, Usher faced the challenge of determining the final track listing. Usher, Dupri, Reid, and then-A&R rep Mark Pitts each had their favorites among the forty, but decided to choose those which "came up consistently more". The collective was able to settle on fifteen of them, with two interludes completing the seventeen track list. Many songs were set aside for future use, including "Red Light" and a remix of "Yeah!". Usher and Arista held advance listenings for the album, a few months before its actual release; he also appeared on television to promote Confessions.

With the music theft on the internet threatening to undermine sales following the release, Usher and his management readied a follow-up release of Confessions with an additional marketing blitz, to boost sales. The idea was considered "musically driven" after Zomba, who absorbed Arista, management was excited about "My Boo", a song that was recorded for the original version of the album but failed to meet deadline. However, it actually began when American R&B and soul singer Alicia Keys, who is featured on the track, "brought in that the talk of repackaging started". With the inclusion of "My Boo", they thought of the album as complete. While they knew of other artists releasing special editions of their albums, the label felt that Confessions had the edge because of its previous success and its physical changes, including new cover art, an expanded CD booklet, a pullout poster and a letter to fans from Usher. The new version includes "My Boo" and "Red Light", which were leaked alongside other songs that did not appear in the album, and a remix of "Confessions Part II", and "Seduction"; original tracks were also improved like the extended version of "Confessions Part I" and a rap added by American rapper Jadakiss in "Throwback". The label itself treated the version a new album, with full media advertisements. The album was re-issued in October 2004, seven months after its initial release.

A 20th anniversary expanded edition of the album was released on November 1, 2024.

=== Marketing ===
In selecting which single to release first, Usher and the label considered various marketing strategies. While there were many potential lead singles that could fare well in music markets, the choice narrowed to "Yeah!" and "Burn". Even though "Burn" was just what the label was looking for, they believed that "Yeah!" would be a blockbuster. Meanwhile, they felt "Burn" also failed to meet their expectations: "'Burn' being a great song is one thing, but it's one of them things where people said, 'It's strong, but can we make history with that?' At the end of the day, you want an event."

Usher was skeptical about whether "Yeah!"—which is largely composed around crunk—would be a good choice, given his mindset envisioning "Confessions" as an R&B record. KP recalled, "Everybody was scared to make that first step."

With much debate between two songs, "Burn" was originally chosen as the lead single, with plans for filming its music video in late 2003. Meanwhile, Lil Jon leaked "Yeah!" to DJs across the United States in November 2003. Originally, the label did not intend "Yeah!" as a proper single. Released to street DJs and mixtapes, it was meant to cultivate fans who waited for three years since the release of 8701. While record labels stayed idle during the Christmas season, "Yeah!" was getting favorable and quick response from radio stations though nobody was promoting; it was finally released as the lead single in January 2004. "Yeah" was followed by single releases of "Burn" and "Confessions Part II", in March and June respectively.

To keep the album atop the chart, "My Boo" was targeted for release after "Confessions Part II" was diminishing on the Hot 100. The b-side of the UK release includes "Red Light" and "Sweet Lies". The single again topped the US Hot 100, giving the album its fourth consecutive number-one. "Caught Up" was released as the album's fifth and final single, and reached number eight in the United States.

=== Tour ===
Usher supported the album with a two-month concert tour called the Truth Tour. The tour set featured a small stage up on top of the main stage, where the band played with Usher and his supporting dancers left with enough room to perform. The smaller stage had a mini platform attached to it—which lowered to the main stage—and had two big staircases on both sides of it. To the left, a group of circular staircases climbed to the top, and to the right, there was a fire escape replete with steps and an elevator. Kanye West, who had finished his own headlining tour for his 2004 album The College Dropout, was the opening act for the Truth Tour.

Preceding Usher's entrance was a short movie showing him getting dressed, following on with him performing the opening song "Caught Up", with Usher dressed in all white. The second song performed was "You Make Me Wanna...", where two dancers stayed on the top stage with Usher while two male dancers came out to the lower level with two chairs each in their hands. Each dancer threw one chair up to the top, with Usher already in hand with his own chair, with everyone following a set dance routine. Following this, Usher performed "U Remind Me", where he danced by himself during a breakdown of the track. He then sang "That's What It's Made For", following on with the song "Bad Girl", where Usher was dressed up in a lavender suit and came out in a chrome chair. During the song, Usher picked out a female from the crowd, transitioning to "Superstar", singing to the fan. Usher continued singing to the fan, performing "Can U Handle It?", closing the song by kissing the fan who then left the stage. Usher closed his performance with Confessions' lead single "Yeah!".

The American leg of the tour commenced on August 5, 2004, in Hampton, Virginia, and concluded on October 7, 2004, in New York. It was ranked as one of the highest-grossing tours of 2004, grossing $29.1 million.

== Public reaction ==
After Usher and his label held a few listening parties for the album, controversies spread about the mistress-impregnating concept of "Confessions Part II". Although Usher did not foresee such a reaction to the album, Dupri already guessed, while making the album, what the public's reaction would be: "People are gonna question [Usher] on a couple of little lyrics ..." Coincidentally, Usher ended his relationship with Chilli early in 2004. People speculated about their breakup given the content of the album and Usher's early interviews about its themes. With lyrics Usher admitted to have written because of his guilty conscience, people assumed that he and Chilli broke up because he was unfaithful. In a February 2004 radio interview, Chilli claimed that Usher "cheated" on her, and that caused their relationship to split.

Amidst widespread rumors, Usher stated, "People assume things, because as I said, I pull from my personal experiences to make my music." He added that he loved Chilli, however, "... it just didn't work out. But cheating is not what caused the relationship to collide and crash ..." Although "Burn" is a reference to his dying relationship with Chilli—hence the title—Usher answered the press that the impregnating issue was not taken from a specific situation in his life. He also revealed that his friends who went through similar situations inspired him to write those songs: "... it's just something that I collectively got energy from everybody around me that had been through it." In early 2006, Dupri revealed that the story behind the album is his: "... me cheating on my steady girlfriend, having a baby with that other woman and having to confess to everything that happened to my main girl."

== Critical reception ==
Professional ratings
Aggregate scores
Source	Rating
Metacritic	71/100
Review scores
Source	Rating
AllMusic	5/5 stars
Blender	3/5 stars
Entertainment Weekly	B+
The Guardian	2/5 stars
Los Angeles Times	3/4 stars
The New Zealand Herald	4/5 stars
Pitchfork	9.0/10
Q	3/5 stars
Rolling Stone	3/5 stars
USA Today	3.5/4 stars
Vibe	3.5/5

Confessions was met with generally positive reviews. At Metacritic, which assigns a normalized rating out of 100 to reviews from professional publications, the album received an average score of 71, based on 13 reviews.

Matt Cibula of PopMatters wrote that it "might be the best English-language pop album of the year". Entertainment Weekly's Jem Aswad said that Usher "reveals his new-found maturity by opening with the grittiest song he's ever done." Laura Checkoway of Vibe said that, "Though Confessions doesn't bring Usher all the way to the artistic maturity one might hope for, tracking this star's progression definitely has its satisfactions." Q magazine observed "addictive R&B hooks and all-dancin', all-lovin' subject matter boosted with hot production tweaks." Amy Linden of The Village Voice commented that "Usher's (alleged) character flaws are easily forgiven, though, because he can sing his cheating ass off," and concluded, "Like 2002's big-selling but underrated 8701, Confessions is a top-of-the-line pop-soul showcase that ... manages to be commercially savvy without coming off as too desperate. Sorta like Usher himself." Kelefa Sanneh of The New York Times said that near the end, the songwriting "fails" Usher on a "heavily front-loaded" R&B album, but felt that his performance is solid throughout:

The pleasure of listening to Usher is the pleasure of listening to a singer who knows exactly what he's doing. 'Truth Hurts,' a seemingly innocent (if plaintive) 1970s throwback, turns nasty when the narrator suddenly reveals that the first two verses were full of lies. Which raises the question: are these supposed 'confessions' true? He loves toying with his audience this way, loves telling us exactly how bad he is, then daring us to believe him.

In a mixed review, Caroline Sullivan of The Guardian criticized its "production gloss" and said that, although Usher's "fluid delivery" redeems weak tracks, there are only two "great songs"—"Yeah!" and the title track—and "17 less so." Rolling Stone writer Laura Sinagra said that he "is coming of age, again", but "still doesn't quite cut it as a horny roughneck". Jon Caramanica of Blender viewed that Usher's songwriting "isn't a strength, and his ballads often drown in their own inanity". The Washington Post's Elizabeth Mendez Berry called Confessions "Usher's strongest recording to date" but found the more sexual songs mundane. Robert Christgau from The Village Voice named "Confessions Part II" and "Bad Girl" as "choice cuts", indicating "a good song on an album that isn't worth your time or money".

=== Accolades ===
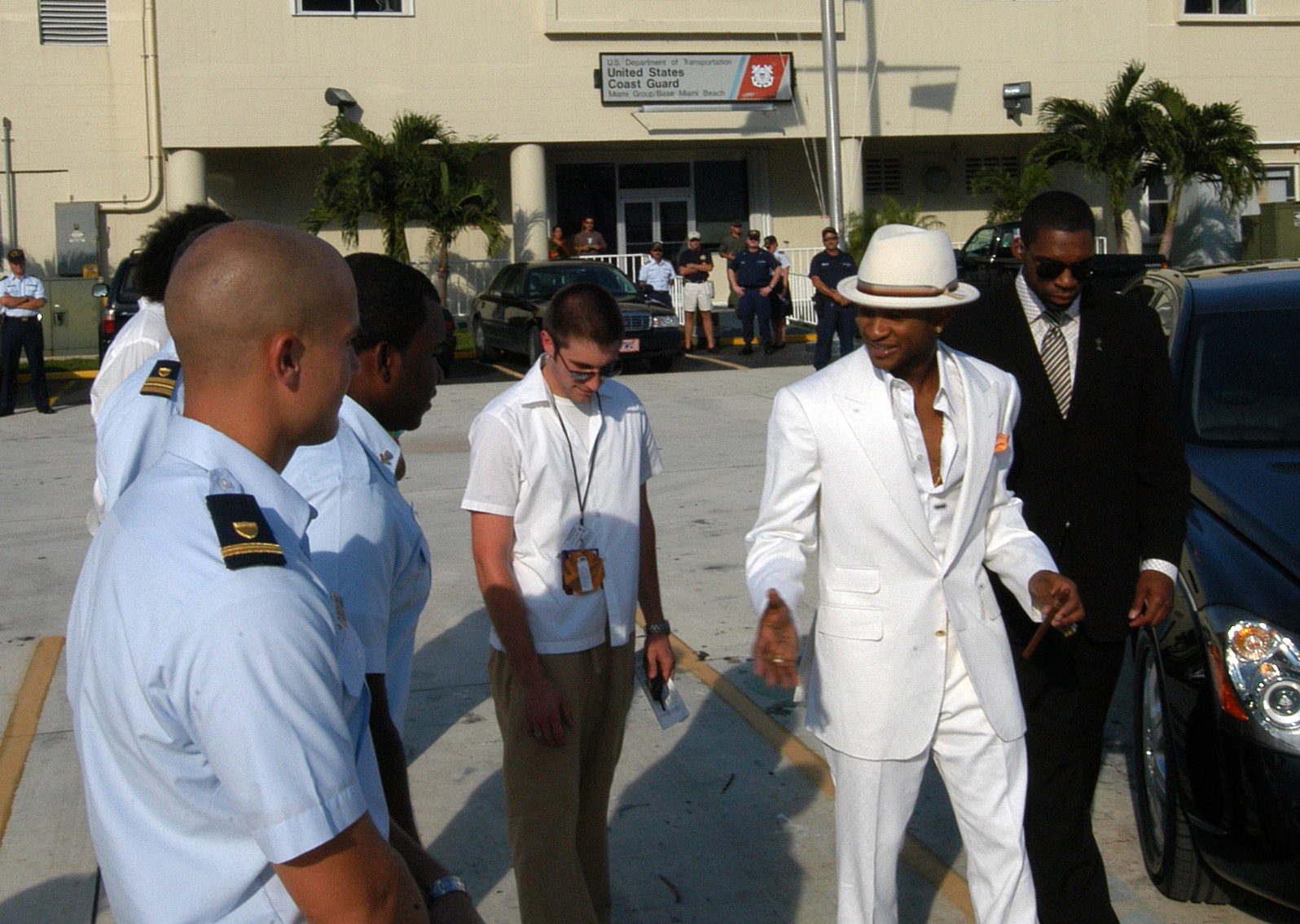
Usher at the 2004 MTV Video Music Awards before winning his first two awards.

The album earned Usher numerous accolades. At the 47th Grammy Awards, he was nominated for eight categories and won three: Best Contemporary R&B Album, Best R&B Performance by a Duo or Group with Vocal (for "My Boo") and Best Rap/Sung Collaboration (for "Yeah!"). Usher won awards at the 2005 Soul Train Music Awards: R&B/Soul Album, Male (for Confessions); R&B/Soul Single, Male for ("Confessions Part II"); R&B/Soul Single, Group, Band or Duo (for "My Boo"); and R&B/Soul or Rap Dance Cut (for "Yeah!"). At the 2004 American Music Awards, he won four, including Favorite Soul/R&B Album and Favorite Male Soul/R&B Artist. At the 2004 Billboard Music Awards, Usher racked up eleven awards, more than any other artist in one night at the time. These include Artist of the Year, Male Artist of the Year, and Hot 100 Song of the Year for "Yeah!". In December 2009 it was ranked as the best solo album and second best overall album of the 2000–2009 decade. Its singles "Yeah!", "Burn, and "My Boo" were all ranked as some of the best songs of the 2000–2009 decade, respectively placing in order at number two, number 21, and number 36.

== Commercial performance ==
Confessions was commercially successful, selling 1.096 million copies in the United States in its first week of release. It became the highest-ever first week sales by an R&B artist, the second-highest first week sales for a male artist, and the seventh-highest first week sales of the recorded album charts history by SoundScan at the time of its release. It also equates the combined first-week sales of his four previous album releases, including his live album called Live. The feat also carved history in Arista records having the first in any of their released albums to reach such sales. The success of the thirty-year-old record label, however, was attributed to its merging with Zomba Records. As of March 2013 it has the tenth highest first week album sales in history.

The album debuted at number one on the US Billboard 200, becoming Usher's first number-one album. Confessions also hit number-one on the Canadian Albums Chart and the US Top R&B/Hip-Hop Albums. Its early, and successive, progress on the chart was said to be partly sustained by its strong single releases and plenty of press appearances and promotions. With "Yeah!" propelling the album's debut atop the chart, "Burn", the second single off the album, facilitated Confessions's continuing dominance as well. The first two released singles were competing on the Billboard Hot 100; the latter ended the twelve-week number-one chart run of the former. As the album's third single, "Confessions Part II", was about to top the chart and Usher to join with English pop and rock group the Beatles as the only acts to achieve three consecutive number-one singles, American R&B singer Fantasia Barrino's debut single "I Believe" prevented it from happening. Despite this, Usher became the first artist to top the Billboard Hot 100 Airplay with three consecutive number-one singles. "Burn" achieved only eight non-consecutive weeks on the Hot 100 after "Confessions Part II" topped the chart; it became Usher's second time to replace his own single at the top. "Yeah!" and "Burn" were 2004's top best-selling singles in the United States, placing at number one and two respectively on the Billboard Chart Year-Ender. Again, it honored Usher being the first act to achieve the feat since 1964 with the Beatles' "I Want to Hold Your Hand" and "She Loves You".

The album continued its dominance on the chart. D12 World by D12 ended its five consecutive weeks run at the top spot; however, Confessions reclaimed the position the following week. The album spent a total 9 non-consecutive weeks at number one on the Billboard 200, becoming the longest-running number one album of the millennium until 2009, when country singer Taylor Swift spent 11 weeks atop the charts with Fearless. Over one month after its release, Confessions was certified triple-platinum by the Recording Industry Association of America for three million US shipments. Confessions topped the list of the most-shipped albums of 2004 in the United States and was the best selling album of the year with 7,978,594 copies sold. Confessions was the sixth best-selling album of the 2000s decade in the US. In February 2024, it reached 14 million shipments in the US, according to the Recording Industry Association of America. Confessions sold over 15 million copies worldwide, making it the best-selling R&B album and best-selling album by a Black artist of the 21st century.

== Legacy ==
=== Music industry ===
With sales of nearly eight million in 2004, Confessions was the most-shipped album of the year in the US. Along with the success of the American singer Norah Jones's second album, Feels like Home (2004), as well as breakthroughs albums by many new and old artists, it was seen as a sign that US record sales were slowly recovering after three straight years of decline due to competing DVDs and video games and the prevalent music piracy. By the end of 2004, the industry had sold 667 million albums, an increase of about 1.6 percent, as recorded by Nielsen SoundScan. Compared with sales records in 2003, the figures showed eight percent increase. The album's success also exemplified urban music's commercial dominance during the early 2000s, which featured massive crossover success on the Billboard charts by R&B and hip-hop artists. In 2004, all 12 songs that topped the Billboard Hot 100 were by African-American recording artists and accounted for 80% of the number-one R&B hits that year. Along with Usher's streak of singles, Top 40 radio and both pop and R&B charts were topped by OutKast's "Hey Ya!", Snoop Dogg's "Drop It Like It's Hot", Terror Squad's "Lean Back", and Ciara's "Goodies". Chris Molanphy of The Village Voice later remarked that "by the early 2000s, urban music was pop music."

In a year-end article for The New York Times, writer Ben Sisario dubbed 2004 "the year of Usher". The success of the album put Usher in the mainstream, becoming the biggest artist of 2004. Others also said that Usher might be the successor of Michael Jackson. Uproxx says Confessions "has gone on to establish itself as one of the landmark albums in pop culture", describing it as "an irreplaceable pillar in R&B lore". According to Vibe magazine, the album is credited for having "birthed" many contemporary albums such as Adele's 21, Miguel's Kaleidoscope Dream, Drake's So Far Gone, Omarion's O, Jason Derulo's self-titled debut and others.

Bryan-Michael Cox, who co-wrote and co-produced "Burn", earned credibility in the music industry for his role in the album. Cox had been producing records for several American artists, including Alicia Keys, B2K, Mariah Carey and Destiny's Child, among others, but he considered "Burn" as his crowning moment, which earned him two Grammy Award nominations. With 2004 deemed to be his introduction to a larger, more mainstream audience, Cox stated in an interview for MTV that many people were starting to recount what he had done. A songwriter was awarded $44 million in a lawsuit involving a song from Usher's diamond-certified album Confessions after a jury sided with Daniel Marino in a claim that his "Club Girl" became Usher's hit "Bad Girl"

Confessions ranked 2nd best album of the 2000s on the Billboard Top 200 Albums of the Decade 2000s list, higher than any other solo album. The album is also ranked as the 16th best album on the Billboard Top 200 Albums of All Time. In 2020, the album was ranked number 432 on the Top 500 Albums of All-Time by Rolling Stone. With global sales exceeding 15 million, Confessions is the best-selling album by a black artist in the 21st century. Confessions makes Usher the only male solo R&B artist to sell 10 million copies of a single album in the United States during the Soundscan era and the first of only two black artists to reach this mark since the year 2000 (the other artist being American rapper Nelly with his debut album Country Grammar). After Confessions was certified diamond by the Recording Industry Association of America for shipments of 10 million copies in the US, no new album was certified diamond until Adele's 2011 album 21 reached diamond-status, the longest between any two new diamond albums since the inception of the association.

=== Pop culture ===
In 2020, music industry magazine Billboard' ranked Usher the "Greatest Pop Star of 2004". Referring to a 2008 article from MTV, writer Shaheem Reid declared that "with Confessions, Usher has made the Big Connection [...]. That connection our parents felt when Marvin Gaye sang on the Here, My Dear album." Billboard pointed out how most of the secrets revealed and storytelling in the album was inspired by Jermaine Dupri's situation, but they also noted Usher's marketing and "dalliances outside of his public relationship with TLC's Chilli that provided the material for Confessions". The writer praised Usher's commercial power during the Confessions era, as he would influence future pop stars: "Even if you didn't listen to R&B, you knew this album. And if you did listen to R&B, this was the blueprint for all your favorite stars to come: Drake, Justin Bieber, Miguel, Chris Brown and Omarion have all cited Usher's influence. And though Beyoncé spoke about Thriller as the touchstone for her career-defining self-titled release in 2013, the way the lyrics tease revelations about her personal life with her husband, both good and bad, feels more indebted to Confessions than anything Michael Jackson wrote."

15 years after the album was released, A. Harmony of Bustle wrote it was "the catalyst that propelled him to superstardom" and "forever changed the landscape of music". Harmony noted the album's impact on R&B and pop music with the success of "Yeah!" leading "countless R&B stars, from Ciara to T-Pain, to launch careers on the foundation of Crunk&B". The writer also noted the album's influence on trap music and future generations of R&B and hip-hop artists.

Think of trap soul as Crunk&B's mellowed, more subdued successor. Like crunk, it's punchy and heavily steeped in hip-hop influences. But like Usher's take on songs like "Yeah!" and "Follow Me," trap soul has contoured edges and smoother textures. From 6LACK's acerbic laments on love to H.E.R.'s dark, smoky vocals, current trends in R&B can be traced back to Usher's techniques. In this regard, Usher's mark on R&B is indelible; he not only inspired countless artists in the early 2000s, but also charted a course for today's stars.

Harmony also pointed out the album's influence on the music industry and pop culture as a whole, as Confessions changed how albums are marketed and "proved that gossip can sell records". Later albums such as Beyoncé's Lemonade, which was fueled by infidelity and divorce rumors with her rapper husband Jay-Z, relationship rumors around Janelle Monáe's Dirty Computer, and Ariana Grande's Thank U, Next coming off the heels of her public break up with comedian Pete Davidson were used as examples of how Usher's Confessions brought "the relationship between the gossip pages and the album charts... stronger than before".

== Track listing ==
Confessions track listing
No.	Title	Writer(s)	Producer(s)	Length
1.	"Intro"		James Lackey; Usher Raymond	0:46
2.	"Yeah!" (featuring Lil Jon and Ludacris)	Jonathan Smith; Sean Garrett; Patrick "J. Que" Smith; Christopher Bridges; Robert McDowell; James Phillips; LaMarquis Jefferson	Lil Jon; Garrett^{[a]}	4:10
3.	"Throwback"	Richard P. Butler, Jr.; Justin Smith; Que Smith; Lamont Dozier; Brian Holland; Edward Holland; Richard Wylie	Just Blaze	4:01
4.	"Confessions (Interlude)"		Raymond; Valdez Brantley; Juan Johnny Najera; Aaron Spears; Arthur Strong	1:15
5.	"Confessions Part II"	Jermaine Dupri; Bryan-Michael Cox; Raymond	Dupri; Cox^{[b]}	3:49
6.	"Burn"	Dupri; Cox; Raymond	Dupri; Cox^{[b]}	4:16
7.	"Caught Up"	Andre Harris; Vidal Davis; Jason "Poo Bear" Boyd; Ryan Toby	Dre & Vidal	3:44
8.	"Superstar (Interlude)"		Raymond; Brantley; Najera; Spears; Strong	1:04
9.	"Superstar"	Harris; Davis; Boyd; Toby; Nyticka Hemingway	Dre & Vidal	3:29
10.	"Truth Hurts"	James Harris III; Terry Lewis; Raymond; Bobby Ross Avila; Issiah J. Avila	Jimmy Jam & Terry Lewis; Bobby Ross Avila & IZ^{[b]}	3:51
11.	"Simple Things"	Harris III; Lewis; Raymond; B. Avila; I. Avila	Jimmy Jam & Terry Lewis; Bobby Ross Avila & IZ^{[b]}	4:58
12.	"Bad Girl"	Harris III; Lewis; Raymond; Danté Barton; Wil Guice; B. Avila; I. Avila	Dante "Destro Music" Barton; Jimmy Jam & Terry Lewis; Bobby Ross Avila & IZ^{[b]}	4:21
13.	"That's What It's Made For"	Harris III; Lewis; Raymond; B. Avila; I. Avila; James Q. Wright	Jimmy Jam & Terry Lewis; Bobby Ross Avila & IZ^{[b]}; Wright^{[b]}	4:37
14.	"Can U Handle It?"	Robin Thicke; James Gass; Robert Daniels; Raymond	Thicke; Pro J	5:45
15.	"Do It to Me"	Dupri; Cox; Raymond	Dupri; Cox^{[b]}	3:53
16.	"Take Your Hand"	Rich Harrison; Raymond; Leon Huff; Gene McFadden; John Whitehead	Harrison	3:03
17.	"Follow Me"	Harris; Davis; Boyd; Toby	Dre & Vidal; Toby^{[a]}; Boyd^{[a]}	3:30

UK edition bonus tracks
No.	Title	Writer(s)	Producer(s)	Length
18.	"Whatever I Want"	Harrison; Raymond; Johnny Otis; Maxwell Davis; Shuggie Otis	Harrison	3:11
19.	"Confessions Part I"	Dupri; Cox; Raymond	Dupri; Cox^{[b]}	4:21

Special edition Version
No.	Title	Writer(s)	Producer(s)	Length
3.	"Throwback" (featuring Jadakiss)	Butler; J. Smith; P. Smith; Dozier; B. Holland; E. Holland; Wylie; Jason Phillips	Just Blaze	4:46
4.	"Confessions Part I"	Dupri; Cox; Raymond	Dupri; Cox^{[b]}	4:21
5.	"Confessions Part II" (Confessions Special Edit Version)	Dupri; Cox; Raymond	Dupri; Cox^{[b]}	3:30
6.	"Burn" (Confessions Special Edit Version)	Dupri; Cox; Raymond	Dupri; Cox^{[b]}	3:51
9.	"Superstar" (Confessions Special Edit Version)	Harris; Davis; Boyd; Toby; Hemingway	Dre & Vidal	3:10
18.	"My Boo" (Duet with Alicia Keys)	Dupri; Manuel Seal; Adonis Shropshire; Raymond; Keys	Dupri; Seal^{[b]}	3:43
19.	"Red Light"	J. Smith; Garrett; P. Smith; Keri Hilson; Robert McDowell	Lil Jon; Garrett^{[a]}	4:48
20.	"Seduction"	Harris III; Lewis; Raymond; B. Avila; I. Avila; James Q. Wright	Jimmy Jam & Terry Lewis; Bobby Ross Avila & IZ^{[b]}; Wright^{[b]}	4:33
21.	"Confessions Part II" (Remix) (featuring Shyne, Kanye West and Twista)	Dupri; Cox; Raymond; Moses Barrow; West; Carl Mitchell	Dupri; Cox^{[b]}	4:28

Notes

- ^{^[a]} signifies a vocal producer.
- ^{^[b]} signifies a co-producer.

Sample credits

- "Throwback" contains a sample of Dionne Warwick's song "You're Gonna Need Me" (1973)
- "Superstar" contains a sample of Willie Hutch's song "Mack's Stroll/The Getaway (Chase Scene)" (1973).
- "Take Your Hand" contains a sample of Harold Melvin & The Blue Notes's song "Is There a Place for Me?" (1973).
- "Whatever I Want" contains excerpts from Preston Love's "Chili Mac".

== Personnel ==
Credits for Confessions adapted from AllMusic and album's liner notes.

- Darcy Aldridge – backing vocals (track 11)
- Bobby Ross Avila – co-producer (tracks 10–13, 20); guitar (tracks 10–12); keyboards (tracks 11–13); piano (tracks 11, 20); backing vocals (track 11); additional drum programming (track 12); Moog Taurus (track 13); flute (track 20); Wurlitzer, scratches, and strings (track 10)
- Dante "Destro" Barton – producer and additional engineering (track 12)
- Jason Boyd – vocal producer (tracks 7, 9, 17)
- Valdez Brantley – producer (track 8)
- Bryan-Michael Cox – co-producer (tracks 4–6, 15, 21)
- Larry Cox – additional keyboards (track 14)
- Vincent Creusot – additional recording assistant (track 18)
- Ian Cross – engineer (track 10), additional engineering (track 21)
- Kevin "KD" Davis – engineer (track 16)
- Vidal Davis – producer (tracks 7, 9, 17), mixing (tracks 7, 9)
- Vince DiLorenzo – engineer (track 7, 9, 17)
- Jermaine Dupri – producer (tracks 4–6, 15, 18, 21), mixing (tracks 4–6, 18, 21)
- E Bass – guitar (track 3)
- Blake Eisman – engineer (track 3, 19)
- Faith Evans – additional backing vocals (track 9)
- Brian Frye – engineer (tracks 4–6, 15, 18, 21)
- John Frye – mixing (tracks 2, 19)
- Richard Furch – mixing
- Sean Garrett – vocal producer (tracks 2, 10), backing vocals (track 2)
- Serban Ghenea – mixing (tracks 10–13, 17, 20)
- John Hanes – additional Pro Tools engineer (tracks 10–13, 17, 20)
- Andre Harris – producer (tracks 7, 9, 17), mixing (tracks 7, 9)
- Rich Harrison – producer and instrumentation (track 16)
- Delicia Hassan – production coordination (track 2)
- John Horesco IV – engineer (tracks 4, 5, 21), mixing assistant (tracks 4–6, 15, 18, 21)
- Jun Ishizeki – additional engineering (track 21)
- IZ – co-producer and percussion (tracks 10–13, 20), drums (tracks 10, 11, 13, 20), bass (tracks 10, 13), guitar (tracks 10, 20), scratches (tracks 10, 12), Moog Taurus (track 10), keyboards (track 13)
- Jadakiss – rap (track 3)
- Jimmy Jam – producer (tracks 10–13, 20), Fender Rhodes (track 11)
- LaMarquis Jefferson – bass (tracks 2, 9)
- Just Blaze – producer (track 3)
- Alicia Keys – vocals (track 18)
- L-Roc – additional keyboards (track 2)
- James Lackey – producer (track 1)
- Ken Lewis – engineer, mixing, and guitar (track 3)
- Terry Lewis – producer (tracks 10–13, 20)
- Kelly "Dread" Liebelt – additional engineering (track 9)
- Craig Love – guitar (track 19)
- Ludacris – rap (track 2)
- Kevin Mahoney – additional engineering (track 21)
- Anthony Mandler – photography
- Daniel Marino – guitar (track 12)
- Matt Marrin – engineer (tracks 10–13, 20)
- Manny Marroquin – mixing (track 14)
- Tony Maserati – mixing (track 16)
- Ann Mincieli – additional engineering (track 18)
- Tadd Mingo – assistant engineer (tracks 4–6, 15, 18, 21)
- Johnny "Natural" Najera – producer (track 8)
- Paula Patton – backing vocals (track 14)
- Herb Powers – mastering
- Pro J – producer and instrumentation (track 14)
- Edward Quesada – assistant engineer (track 4)
- Mickael Rangeard – additional engineering (track 18)
- Usher Raymond – executive producer, producer (tracks 1, 4, 8), lead vocals (all tracks), backing vocals (tracks 2, 10–14, 19, 20)
- Tim Roberts – mixing assistant (tracks 10–13, 17, 20)
- Donnie Scantz – engineer (track 2)
- Manuel Seal – co-producer (track 18)
- Shyne – rap (track 21)
- Jon Smeltz – mixing (tracks 7, 9)
- Jan Smith – vocal producer, vocal coach
- Jonathan "Lil Jon" Smith – producer and mixing (track 2, 19), additional backing vocals (track 2)
- Aaron Spears – producer (track 8)
- Chris Steinmetz – additional engineering (track 21)
- Patrice "ButtaPhly" Stewart – backing vocals (track 13)
- Arthur "Buddy" Strong – producer (track 8)
- Sean Tallman – assistant engineer (track 2)
- Phil Tan – mixing (tracks 4–6, 15, 18, 21)
- Robin Thicke – producer and instrumentation (track 14)
- Ryan Toby – vocal producer (tracks 7, 9, 17)
- Tony "Proof" Tolbert – backing vocals (tracks 10, 12, 20)
- Twista – rap (track 21)
- Mark Vinten – engineer (tracks 2, 19)
- D.L. Warfield – layout design
- Kanye West – rap (track 21)
- Ryan West – engineer (track 3)
- Doug Wilson – (track 21)
- Stevie Wonder – harmonica (track 4)
- Ghian Wright – assistant engineer (track 10)
- James "Big Jim" Wright – co-producer (tracks 13, 20), bass (tracks 11, 20), Wurlitzer (track 13), keyboards (track 20)

== Charts ==
=== Weekly charts ===
Weekly chart performance for Confessions
Chart (2004–2005)	Peak position
Australian Albums (ARIA)	2
Australian Urban Albums (ARIA)	1
Austrian Albums (Ö3 Austria)	25
Belgian Albums (Ultratop Flanders)	10
Belgian Albums (Ultratop Wallonia)	7
Canadian Albums (Billboard)	1
Canadian R&B Albums (Nielsen SoundScan)	1
Danish Albums (Hitlisten)	10
Dutch Albums (Album Top 100)	3
European Albums (Billboard)	4
Finnish Albums (Suomen virallinen lista)	20
French Albums (SNEP)	4
German Albums (Offizielle Top 100)	2
Greek Albums (IFPI)	10
Hungarian Albums (MAHASZ)	40
Irish Albums (IRMA)	1
Italian Albums (FIMI)	34
Japanese Albums (Oricon)	10
Malaysian International Albums (RIM)	14
New Zealand Albums (RMNZ)	1
Norwegian Albums (VG-lista)	2
Polish Albums (ZPAV)	35
Scottish Albums (Official Charts)	5
South African Albums (RISA)	1
South African Albums (RISA) Special Edition	17
Spanish Albums (Promusicae)	60
Swedish Albums (Sverigetopplistan)	11
Swiss Albums (Schweizer Hitparade)	3
Taiwanese Albums (Five Music)	12
UK Albums (Official Charts)	1
UK R&B Albums (Official Charts)	1
US Billboard 200	1
US Top R&B/Hip-Hop Albums (Billboard)	1

=== Year-end charts ===
Annual chart performance for Confessions
Chart (2004)	Position
Australian Albums (ARIA)	11
Belgian Albums (Ultratop Flanders)	29
Belgian Albums (Ultratop Wallonia)	59
Dutch Albums (Album Top 100)	8
French Albums (SNEP)	40
German Albums (Offizielle Top 100)	17
New Zealand Albums (RMNZ)	5
Swedish Albums (Sverigetopplistan)	63
Swiss Albums (Schweizer Hitparade)	14
UK Albums (OCC)	7
US Billboard 200	1
US Top R&B/Hip-Hop Albums (Billboard)	1
Worldwide Albums (IFPI)	1
Chart (2005)	Position
Australian Albums (ARIA)	56
Dutch Albums (Album Top 100)	55
French Albums (SNEP)	84
UK Albums (OCC)	90
US Billboard 200	11
US Top R&B/Hip-Hop Albums (Billboard)	13
Chart (2023)	Position
US Billboard 200	181
Chart (2024)	Position
US Billboard 200	135
US Top R&B/Hip-Hop Albums (Billboard)	72

=== Decade-end charts ===
Decade-end chart performance for Confessions
Chart (2000–2009)	Position
Australian Albums (ARIA)	91
UK Albums (OCC)	72
US Billboard 200	2

== Certifications ==
Certifications for Confessions
Region	Certification	Certified units/sales
Australia (ARIA)	5× Platinum	350,000^{‡}
Canada (Music Canada)	7× Platinum	700,000^{‡}
Denmark (IFPI Danmark)	3× Platinum	60,000^{‡}
France (SNEP)	Gold	100,000^{*}
Germany (BVMI)	Gold	100,000^{^}
Hungary (MAHASZ)	Platinum	20,000^{^}
Japan (RIAJ)	Platinum	250,000^{^}
Netherlands (NVPI)	Gold	40,000^{^}
New Zealand (RMNZ)	7× Platinum	105,000^{‡}
Russia (NFPF)	2× Platinum	40,000^{*}
Singapore (RIAS)	Gold	5,000^{*}
Switzerland (IFPI Switzerland)	Platinum	40,000^{^}
United Kingdom (BPI)	6× Platinum	1,800,000^{‡}
United States (RIAA)	14× Platinum	14,000,000^{‡}
Summaries
Europe (IFPI)	2× Platinum	2,000,000^{*}
^{*} Sales figures based on certification alone.^{^} Shipments figures based on certification alone.^{‡} Sales+streaming figures based on certification alone.

== See also ==
- List of best-selling albums
- List of best-selling albums in the United States
- Truth Tour
