= Rico Love =

American songwriter (born 1982)

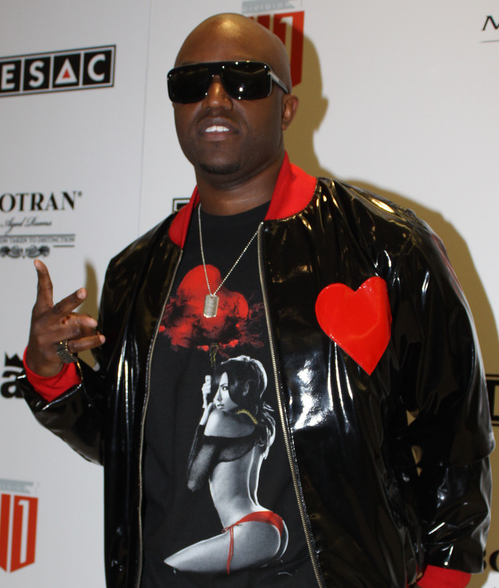
- Rico Love in 2010

Background information
- Born: Richard Preston Butler Jr. December 3, 1982 (age 43); New Orleans, Louisiana, U.S.
- Origin: Milwaukee, Wisconsin, U.S.
- Genres: R&B; hip-hop
- Occupations: Songwriter; record producer; singer; rapper
- Years active: 2003–present
- Labels: Division1; Crown World; Interscope; Universal Motown; J; US; Warner/Chappell
- Children: 2
- Website: welovemusicconference.com

Richard Preston Butler Jr. (born December 3, 1982), better known by his stage name Rico Love, is an American songwriter and record producer. He was born in New Orleans, Louisiana, but split his childhood between Milwaukee, Wisconsin, and Harlem, New York City. He attended Florida A&M and, while visiting Atlanta, worked his way into the music industry through connections with singer Usher, who became one of Butler's frequent collaborators.

Usher's 2004 song, "Throwback", was Butler's first major songwriting credit; its parent album, Confessions (2004), won Best Contemporary R&B Album at the 47th Annual Grammy Awards. Butler's contributions to Beyoncé's I Am... Sasha Fierce, Usher's Raymond v. Raymond (2009), and the latter album's single, "There Goes My Baby", each yielded Grammy Awards. He also co-wrote "Heart Attack" for Trey Songz, which received a nomination for the award. Throughout the decade, he was credited on commercially successful R&B singles including Usher's "Hey Daddy (Daddy's Home)", Nelly's "Just a Dream" and "Gone", and Beyoncé's "Sweet Dreams". He has worked with artists such as Kelly Rowland, Mario, Chris Brown, Alexandra Burke, Keri Hilson, Fergie, and Fantasia.

As a recording artist, Butler has released two studio albums: TTLO (2015) and Even Kings Die (2018); the former spawned the single "They Don't Know", which moderately entered the Billboard Hot 100. He founded the record label Division1 in 2010; it was first an imprint of Universal Motown, and later Interscope Records before becoming an independent label. Division1 has signed artists including Young Chris, Tiara Thomas, and Teairra Marí.

== Early life ==
Love was born in New Orleans, Louisiana, and his parents divorced at an early age. As a result of the divorce Love spent his childhood growing up in two different cities, in Milwaukee, Wisconsin, with his mother and Harlem, New York City, with his father. Love's mother encouraged him as a child to write poetry. Love wrote his own poems and went on to joining the African American Children's Theater where he recited Langston Hughes and acted. Love had already been writing his own poems before he was introduced to rap in his early teens. By the end of high school Love had decided to pursue a career in rap but would go to college simultaneously, "I'm [going] to go to school instead of just sitting on the block. If I hadn't gone to college I would've been a drug dealer."

While in college at Florida A&M University Love stayed involved in his music by winning many rap battles and talent shows. On the weekends Love would leave for Atlanta, Georgia, for the benefit of its studios and popular music scene. While visiting Atlanta, Love met members of Jagged Edge who were an influence on Love's songwriting development. Love eventually left college because of a paperwork error made by the college's administration's office. Love went to live with some local Atlanta producers the Corna Boyz. This relationship provided Love the opportunity to rap on a remix the producers were creating for Usher. Usher liked Love's work on the remix and eventually signed him to US Records and J Records. Usher requested Love compose lyrics for a song written by Just Blaze. This song eventually became "Throwback" and was featured on Usher's Diamond-selling (10× Platinum) album Confessions. Love next toured with Usher where he met and connected with many music industry players. Usher encouraged Love to become a songwriter and requests for Love's compositions began coming from artists Chris Brown, Omarion, and Marques Houston.

== Music career ==
=== Solo artist ===
As a solo recording artist, Love is both a singer and a rapper. Love was asked by Usher to contribute to the soundtrack to the film In the Mix. Love contributed "Settle Down", "Sweat" featuring Usher, and "On the Grind" featuring Juelz Santana and Paul Wall. Love recorded a solo album in 2007 titled The 5th Element, which he ultimately decided not to release. Though he may not be a prominent solo act, he has contributed his vocals and songwriting to songs by other artists including Fat Joe, Juvenile, Rich Boy, Jamie Foxx, T.I., and his own artist, Young Chris.

After an eight-year hiatus from his solo career and signing his label Division1 to a distribution deal with Interscope Records, Rico Love released the extended play Discrete Luxury, on February 27, 2014; it peaked at number 48 on the Top R&B/Hip-Hop Albums. The lead single from the album, "They Don't Know", debuted and peaked at number 60 on the Billboard Hot 100, becoming Rico Love's highest-charting single as a lead artist. On December 9 of that year, Rico Love released the mixtape El Presidente.

On August 27, 2014, Rico Love released the mixtape I Sin. On December 2, 2014, Rico Love released the lead single from his debut studio album, "Somebody Else".

On February 18, 2015, Rico Love announced the title of his debut studio album, Turn The Lights On, as well as its release date of May 19, 2015. On May 5, 2015, Rico Love would release the album's second single, "Days Go By". On May 18, 2015, the album was released by Division1's joint venture with Interscope, with production from Danja, Benny Blanco, Jim Jonsin and Robopop.

Rico Love supported frequent collaborator, R&B singer Monica on her Code Red Experience Tour.

=== Production/songwriting ===
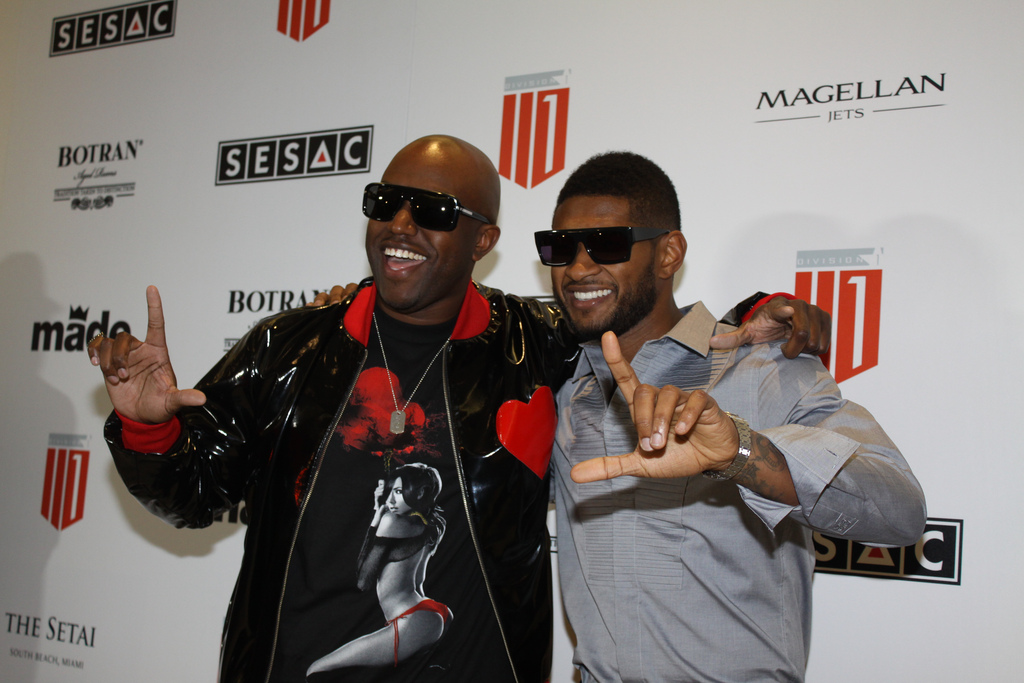
Rico Love (left) and Usher

Love wrote the song "Throwback" at the request of Usher which was a part of the 2004 triple Grammy-winning album Confessions. Love also wrote "Seduction" which was a bonus track on the Confessions special edition release. These were the first of several collaborations between the singer and the writer/producer. In September 2007, Rico Love wrote and produced on the Platinum single "Love Like This" by singer Natasha Bedingfield featuring Sean Kingston. This song was popular with mainstream audiences reaching No. 11 on the Billboard Hot 100. The song was also a hit in dance clubs, reaching number one on the Billboard Hot Dance Club Songs chart.

In May 2008, "Energy" was released as the first single by Keri Hilson from her Gold album In a Perfect World.... The song was co-written and co-produced by Love for the Grammy-nominated artist. The song "Labels or Love", co-written and produced by Love and performed by Fergie was released in May 2008. The song was featured on the deluxe version of her triple Platinum album The Dutchess and also the Gold-selling soundtrack to the film Sex and the City. In November 2008, Beyoncé's double Platinum and 5× Grammy-winning album I Am... Sasha Fierce included four songs featuring Love's songwriting and production. Love wrote and produced on the Platinum single "Sweet Dreams" which reached No. 10 on the Billboard Hot 100. Love's work was also featured on "Scared of Lonely", "Radio", and "Save the Hero". By the end of 2008 in December, another Love co-written and co-produced track was released as a single for the Grammy-nominated artist Pleasure P. "Boyfriend #2" reached No. 2 on the Billboard Hot R&B/Hip-Hop Songs chart. Love wrote and produced five songs on Mario's D.N.A. album released in October 2009. The songs included the single "Thinkin' About You" and "Hi", "Ooh Baby", "Soundtrack to My Broken Heart", and "Get Out".

Love wrote and produced on his former mentor Usher's Raymond v. Raymond album, released in March 2010. The Platinum and Grammy-winning album featured four of Love's compositions including two of the album's singles. The Love co-produced and co-written single "There Goes My Baby" was a hit and stayed at number one on the Billboard Hot R&B/Hip-Hop Songs chart for four weeks and earned Usher a Grammy for his performance on the song. The other single featuring Love's writing and producing was "Hey Daddy (Daddy's Home)" which rose to number two on the Billboard Hot R&B/Hip-Hop Songs chart. Love's other contributions to the album included the songs "Making Love (Into the Night)" and "So Many Girls". At the end of March 2010 the single "Hello Good Morning" penned by Love for Diddy – Dirty Money was released. Diddy is one of Love's mentors in the industry and he was honored to write for the performer/producer/mogul. The song went on to achieve Gold status and was performed by DDM and Rico Love on season nine of American Idol. Nelly's 5.0 album, released in November 2010 contained eight works featuring Love's songwriting and production skills. The first single, "Just a Dream", co-written and co-produced by Love, went Platinum and landed at number three on the Billboard Hot 100. Love also worked on the single "Gone" featuring Kelly Rowland, a follow-up to the 2002 Nelly hit "Dilemma" also featuring Rowland. Love's other work on the album were on the tracks "Broke", "Making Movies", "Don't It Feel Good", "K.I.S.S.", "Nothing Without Her", and "Move That Body". Love wrote, produced, and appeared as an artist on Jamie Foxx's Best Night of My Life album released December 2010. The album's first single "Living Better Now" features Rick Ross and was co-written and co-produced by Love. Love wrote "Freak", which also features his appearance as an artist, and "Sex On the Beach". Love is managed by Made Communication, Miami, Florida.

He has also written and produced for Fergie, Chris Brown, ASAP Rocky, David Guetta, Wiz Khalifa, and Mary J. Blige.

=== Division 1 ===
Division 1
- Founded: November 2010
- Founder: Rico Love
- Status: Active
- Distributor: Interscope Records
- Genre: Hip-hop, R&B
- Country of origin: United States
- Location: Miami, Florida (2010–present)

In November 2010, Love launched Division 1 which originally partnered with Universal Motown but later moved the venture to Interscope Records. In 2011, Love signed R&B artist Teairra Marí & rap artist Young Chris to his label. In 2013, Love's label venture signed the artist, Tiara Thomas, to its roster. Love also has a production company of the same name to which he signed producers, Earl Hood, Eric Goudy, and D Town. In 2014, Rico Love signed Trina to his label.

== Artistry ==
Love has cited various artists as influences such as Usher (who originally signed Love), Sean "Diddy" Combs, Michael Jackson, Marvin Gaye, R. Kelly, Queen, Smokey Robinson, Elton John, and Miles Davis.

Love has explained when composing he does not write lyrics down or even spend many hours working on songs. He simply listens to a beat and then sings what comes to him. He was quoted as learning this technique from Jagged Edge. Love claims that his technique gives him the ability to write songs very quickly which affords him the opportunity to place more songs on any single album than what most writers could.

== Personal life ==
He has two children with photographer Robin Thompson known as Robin V; a son, Carys Preston, and a daughter, Believe Beyond.

== Discography ==
Studio albums

- The 5th Element (2007) Shelved
- Turn the Lights On (2015)
- Even Kings Die (2018)
- Rico Love Presents: Emerging Women of R&B (2020)

EPs

- Discrete Luxury (2013)
- Turn The Lights On (2015)

Singles

- "They Don't Know" (2013)
- "Bitches Be Like" (2014
- "Somebody Else" (2015)

== Awards and nominations ==
- 2005 Grammy nomination for Album of the Year – Usher – Confessions
- 2005 Grammy for Best Contemporary R&B Album – Usher – Confessions
- 2009 Grammy nomination for Album of the Year – Beyoncé – I Am... Sasha Fierce
- 2010 Billboard No. 9 Hot R&B/Hip-Hop Songwriter of the Year
- 2010 Billboard No. 6 Hot R&B/Hip-Hop Producer of the Year
- 2010 Billboard No. 26 Hot R&B/Hip-Hop Publisher of the Year
- 2010 Sesac Song Awards for Beyoncé's "Sweet Dreams" and Pleasure P's "Boyfriend #2"
- 2011 Grammy Award for Best Male R&B Vocal Performance - Usher - There Goes My Baby
