= Eyes on This =

Studio album by MC Lyte
- Released: October 3, 1989
- Recorded: 1989
- Studios: Marley Marl's House of Hits (New York, NY); Such-A-Sound (Brooklyn, NY); Power Play (Queens, NY); First Priority Lab (Staten Island, NY); Firehouse (New York, NY)
- Genre: Golden age hip hop
- Length: 47:49
- Labels: First Priority; Atlantic 91304
- Producers: Audio Two; Grand Puba; the King of Chill; Marley Marl; Nat Robinson; PMD

MC Lyte chronology
Lyte as a Rock (1988)	Eyes on This (1989)	Act Like You Know (1991)

Singles from Eyes on This
- 1. "Cha Cha Cha" Released: September 8, 1989; 2. "Stop, Look, Listen" Released: February 1, 1990; 3. "Cappucino" Released: August 2, 1990

Eyes on This is the second studio album by American hip hop recording artist MC Lyte. It was released on October 3, 1989, via First Priority and Atlantic Records, and was produced by Audio Two, Grand Puba, the King of Chill, Marley Marl, and PMD.

The album became the first by a female solo rapper to appear on the Billboard 200 (then called Billboard Top Pop Albums), on which it remained for 20 weeks, peaking No. 86 in November 1989. It also peaking No. 6 on the Billboard Top Black Albums, being the first female solo rapper to break into the top 10 of that chart, as well as the highest position reached by Lyte.

The lead single, "Cha Cha Cha", reached No. 35 on the Billboard Hot Black Singles and spent 19 weeks on the Billboard Hot Rap Singles, peaking at No. 1. "Stop, Look, Listen" and "Cappucino" would become top 10 in the Hot Rap Singles (in No. 9 and No. 8, respectively).

== Recording and production ==
As on the album Lyte as a Rock, most of the songs are produced by Audio Two and King of Chill, incorporating other producers on some specific tracks. "Capuccino" was produced and co-written by Juice Crew's Marley Marl and recorded at his House of Hits home studio in Chestnut Ridge. "Slave 2 the Rhythm" was co-written and produced by EPMD's PMD. "I Am the Lyte" and "Funky Song" was co-written and produced by Brand Nubian's Grand Puba. For his part, Positive K, with whom Lyte had previously worked on the duet "I'm Not Havin' It", has songwriting credits on the track "Rhyme Hangover."

== Music and lyrics ==
The album addresses some social issues such as violence around drugs and addictions ("Cappucino", "Not wit' a Dealer") and machismo ("Please Understand"). Regarding the content of Please Understand, Lyte told Deborah Gregory in an Essence profile "I’ve never let a man dog me and I never will, It’s just not gonna happen!". The track "Survival of the Fittest" is a remix by King of Chill along with Audio Two of the original included on the compilation album The First Priority Music Family: Basement Flavor (1988). As the last track was included "K-Rocks Housin", a set by Lyte's disc jockey DJ K-Rock.

The diss track to Antoinette "Shut the Eff Up! (Hoe)", which was originally the b-side of the single Lyte as a Rock, was included on the album. On the track "Slave 2 the Rhythm" she would say "It took a whole album for you to try and diss me/And ha-ha-ha, slum bitch, you still missed me/But yo, I'm off the dissin tip, cause that takes no creation" and would add "'Gangstress', don't make me laugh" in reference to Antoinette's nickname.

"Shut the Eff Up! (Hoe)" was later sampled on TLC's "Hat 2 da Back", the Lox's "Goin' Be Some Shit" and Common's "Orange Pineapple Juice". "Slave 2 the Rhythm" was sampled by Naughty by Nature on "Strike a Nerve" and by electropunk group Mindless Self Indulgence on "Tornado".

== Artwork ==
The cover photo, taken by Robert Manella, shows Lyte with her DJ K-Rock with two Porsche Carrera '89. This was taken at pier 6 of Brooklyn Bridge Park, with the World Trade Center complex of buildings visible behind them.

In December 2010 the cover was included by Flavorwire in their "11 Stylish '80s Hip-Hop Album Covers" list, reviewing "MC Lyte's hairstyle and oversized power suit haven't necessarily aged well, but her DJ looks smooth, and there's something ageless about lounging by a couple of Porsches before the city skyline. The soft focus adds a touch of mystery to the proceedings."

== Critical reception ==
Professional ratings
Review scores
Source	Rating
AllMusic	3.5/5 stars
Robert Christgau	B+
Rolling Stone	4/5 stars

In his "Consumer Guide" column in The Village Voice, critic Robert Christgau commented "backtalk like a pro, sometimes like an original --the rhythmic obscenities on the spectacularly unsisterly "Shut the Eff Up! (Hoe)" are mind-boggling. Her tales of the drug wars are tough and prowoman, and the narrative tone of "Cappucino"—part fable, part metaphor, part confessional revery, part dumb it-was-only-a-dream—is avant-garde. Elsewhere she's a pro." He also highlighted a better production compared to his debut album. Rolling Stone magazine described the album as a "slamming, street-smart" endeavor. People's Michael Small considered MC Lyte on the album “maintained her reputation as an insult-hurling tough talker who rapped to hard, simple beats”. For his part, Jon Pareles of The New York Times would write in his review of the album "Most of the songs continue to brag and sling insults, a gambit that can wear thin in the course of an album" although he highlighted the presence of songs like Please Understand, Not Wit 'a Dealer and Cappuccino "Even so, MC Lyte still has her ears to the street." John Leland, for Spin, wrote that "the new album is unrelentingly on, making a hard virtue of its simplicity and crudeness. In a genre that shows little patience for the vicissitudes of growing up, Lyte hangs onto her youth, battling more as a tomboy than a sexual warrior, all the while slipping into a childless world of drug dealers and casual murders."

=== Retrospect ===
In 1999, Ego Trip's editors ranked the album No. 17 in their list "Hip Hop's 40 Greatest Album by Year 1989", in Ego Trip's Book of Rap Lists.

Alex Henderson of AllMusic commented that the album "tends to be one-dimensional lyrically -- she spends too much time bragging about how superior her rapping skills are and how inept sucker MCs are. Though it's hard not to admire the technique and strong chops she displays on such boasting fare as "Shut the Eff Up! (Hoe)" and "Slave 2 the Rhythm," she's at her best when telling some type of meaningful story." He also considered "Cappucino" the most outstanding song on the album "Were everything on the album in a class with "Cappuccino," it would have been an outstanding album instead of simply a good one."

In October 2019, on the 30th anniversary of its publication, it was reviewed by Jesse Ducker of Albumism, who commented "Eyes on This showcases Lyte's tenacity and increased confidence as an artist. Her lyrical abilities continued to improve, as she sounded even more confident . With the determination of a bulldog, she attacks each track, showing no mercy towards those who dare step to her." He would also comment on his later albums "Though Eyes On This was a success for Lyte, it was her last album where she mostly focused on emcee shit."

In November 2019 HipHopDX commented on the album "The original femme fatale turned heads and reloaded her arsenal on her sophomore album with a sharp wit, thick-as-molasses funky production and inspired a generation of female rappers including her fellow Brooklynites Lil Kim, Foxy Brown, and contemporaries such as Nicki Minaj and Rapsody."

In September 2020, it was reviewed by Sha Be Allah of The Source, who considered the album a "classic", described it as "Lyte's introduction into stardom", and highlighted "Cappucino", "Cha Cha Cha", and "Shut the Eff Up (Hoe)!"

== Track listing ==
The song writing information is according to the ASCAP website.

No.	Title	Writer(s)	Producer(s)	Length
1.	"Cha Cha Cha"	Freddie Byrd	King Of Chill	3:00
2.	"Slave 2 the Rhythm"	Lana Moorer; Parrish Smith	PMD	4:17
3.	"Cappucino"	Lana Moorer; Marlon Williams	Marley Marl	3:55
4.	"Stop, Look, Listen"	Lana Moorer; Freddie Byrd	King Of Chill	3:19
5.	"Throwin' Words at U"	Lana Moorer; Kirk Robinson	Audio Two	3:00
6.	"Not wit' a Dealer"	Kirk Robinson	Audio Two	3:20
7.	"Survival of the Fittest"	Lana Moorer; Freddie Byrd	King Of Chill	4:08
8.	"Shut the Eff Up! (Hoe)"	Lana Moorer; Nathaniel Robinson Jr.; Kirk Robinson	Audio Two	5:49
9.	"I Am the Lyte"	Lana Moorer; Maxwell Dixon; Kirk Robinson	Grand Puba	4:00
10.	"Rhyme Hangover"	Lana Moorer; Freddie Byrd; Darryl Gibson; Marilyn McLeod; Pamela Sawyer	King Of Chill	2:03
11.	"Funky Song"	Lana Moorer; Maxwell Dixon; Keith Samuels; Simon Carter; Walter Carter; Brian Sherrer; David Ferguson; William Hull; Curtis Reynolds	Grand Puba	3:55
12.	"Please Understand"	Lana Moorer; Kirk Robinson	Audio Two	3:01
13.	"K-Rocks Housin"	Lana Moorer; Nathaniel Robinson Jr.; Kirk Robinson	Audio Two	4:02
Total length:				47:49

=== Sample credits ===
Song title	Sample(s)
"Cha Cha Cha"	"I Can't Live Without You" by Four Tops (1977); "Good Old Music" by Funkadelic (1970); "Rocket in the Pocket" by Cerrone (1978); "Rockin' It" by the Fearless Four (1982); "Kickin' 4 Brooklyn" by MC Lyte (1988)
"Slave 2 the Rhythm"	"Sweet Pea" by Tommy Roe (1966); "Solid" by Ashford & Simpson (1984)
"Cappucino"	"Spaced Out" by the Blackbyrds (1974)
"Stop, Look, Listen'"	"Born to Lose You" by Ecstasy, Passion & Pain (1974); "Lyte Thee Mc" by MC Lyte (1988); "Survival of the Fittest" by MC Lyte (1988)
"Throwin' Words at U"	"Loose Booty" by Sly and the Family Stone (1974); "My Philosophy" by Boogie Down Productions (1988); "Mama Feelgood" by Lyn Collins (1973); "Say It Loud, I'm Black and I'm Proud" by James Brown (1968); "Catch a Groove" by Juice (1976)
"Not wit' a Dealer"	"Do the Funky Penguin" (Part 2) by Rufus Thomas (1971); "Ain't We Funkin' Now" by the Brothers Johnson (1978)
"Survival of the Fittest" (remix)	"Magic Man" by Heart (1976); "Good Old Music" by Funkadelic (1970); "It's Yours" by T La Rock and Jazzy Jay (1984)
"Shut the Eff Up! (Hoe)"	"All the Way Lover" (Live) by Millie Jackson (1979); "Cardova" by the Meters (1969); "Go Stetsa I" by Stetsasonic (1986); "Cappucino" by MC Lyte (1989); "10% Dis" by MC Lyte (1988); "I Cram to Understand U (Sam)" by MC Lyte (1988); Public Service Announcement from G.I. Joe: A Real American Hero (1985); "Change the Beat" (Female Version) by Beside (1982)
"I Am the Lyte"	"I Can Hear You Calling" by Three Dog Night (1970); "Jungle Boogie" by Kool & the Gang (1973); "Lyte as a Rock" by MC Lyte (1988)
"Rhyme Hangover"	"Funky Miracle" by the Meters (1969); "Love Hangover" by Diana Ross (1976)
"Funky Song"	"A Funky Song" by Ripple (1973)
"Please Understand"	"Ease Back" by the Meters (1969); "Sweet for You & Me" by Mtume (1984)
"K-Rocks Housin"	"Loose Booty" by Sly & the Family Stone (1974); "Ooh, I Love It (Love Break)" by Salsoul Orchestra (1983); "Say It Loud, I'm Black and I'm Proud" by James Brown (1968); "Planet Rock" by Afrika Bambaataa and Soulsonic Force (1982)

== Personnel ==
Credits are taken from the liner notes.

- Lead vocals – MC Lyte
- Producer – Audio Two (tracks: 5, 6, 8, 12, 13), Grand Puba Maxwell (tracks: 9, 11), Marley Marl (tracks: 3), Pee MD (tracks: 2), King Of Chill (tracks: 1, 4, 7, 10)
- Mixed By – Audio Two (tracks: 5, 6, 8, 9, 12, 13), DJ Doc (tracks: 2), MC Lyte (tracks: 11), Marley Marl (tracks: 3), Pee MD (tracks: 2), King Of Chill (tracks: 1, 4, 7, 10)
- Engineer – DJ Doc (tracks: 2), Marley Marl (tracks: 3), Milk Dee (tracks: 5 to 10, 12, 13), Shlomo Sonnenfeld (tracks: 1, 4, 11), Yoram Vazan (tracks: 1, 4, 11)
- Art Direction – Bob Defrin
- Design – Lynn Kowalewski
- Mastering – Dennis King
- Photography – Robert Manella
- Executive Producer – Nat Robinson

== Charts ==
=== Weekly charts ===
Chart (1989–90)	Peak position
US Billboard 200	86
US Top R&B/Hip-Hop Albums (Billboard)	6

=== Year-end charts ===
Chart (1990)	Position
US Top R&B/Hip-Hop Albums (Billboard)	33
