= Stop, Look, Listen (MC Lyte and DJ K-Rock song) =

1990 single by MC Lyte and DJ K-Rock

Single by MC Lyte and DJ K-Rock

from the album Eyes on This
- B-side: "Start It Up Y'all" (Audio Two feat. MC Lyte and Positive K)
- Released: February 1, 1990
- Genre: Golden age hip hop
- Length: 3:16
- Label: First Priority; Atlantic Records
- Songwriter(s): Lana Moorer, Freddie Byrd
- Producer(s): King of Chill

MC Lyte singles chronology
"Cha Cha Cha" (1989)	"Stop, Look, Listen" (1990)	"Cappucino" (1990)

Music video
- "Stop, Look, Listen" on YouTube

"Stop, Look, Listen" is a song by MC Lyte with DJ K-Rock, released as the second single from Lyte's second album Eyes on This. It was published on February 1, 1990. In its single version it is an Audio Two remix of the original version of the LP produced by King of Chill.

The song is built around a sample of Ecstasy, Passion & Pain's "Born to Lose You". Also samples Lyte herself in earlier songs like "Survival of the Fittest" and "Lyte Thee Mc".

== Appearances ==
It was later included on the compilation albums The Very Best of MC Lyte (2001), The Shit I Never Dropped (2003), and Cold Rock a Party – Best of MC Lyte (2019). Her music video was included on her compilation video album Lyte Years (1991). The single has also been reissued in 2004.

Later was sampled by herself in her song with Pamela Long of the group Total "Too Fly" from her sixth album Seven & Seven (1998). It was also sampled in songs by others artists like Wreckx-n-Effect's "Rump Shaker", Mary J. Blige's "Reminisce" and Gang Starr with J. Cole's "Family & Loyalty".

== Single track listing ==
=== 12" Vinyl ===
==== A-Side ====
1. "Stop, Look, Listen" (Remix) (6:05)
  - Produced by Audio Two

==== B-Side ====
1. Stop, Look, Listen (Remix Instrumental)" (3:29)
  - Produced by Audio Two
2. "Stop, Look, Listen (LP Version)" (3:16)
3. "Start It Up Y'all" (Audio Two feat. MC Lyte and Positive K) (5:12)

=== Cassette ===
==== A-1 ====
1. "Stop, Look, Listen" (Remix) (6:05)

==== A-2 ====
1. "Start It Up Y'all" (5:12)

== Personnel ==
Credits are taken from the liner notes.

- Lyrics By – Gizmo (tracks: B3), MC Lyte, Milk Dee (tracks: B3), Positive K (tracks: B3), King Of Chill
- Mastered By – Dennis King (D.K.)
- Music By – Gizmo, Milk Dee, King Of Chill (tracks: A, B1 & B2)
- Executive-Producer – Nat Robinson

== Charts ==
Chart (1990)	Peak position
US Hot Rap Songs (Billboard)	9
