= Cappucino (song) =

1989 single by MC Lyte

Single by MC Lyte

from the album Eyes on This
- B-side: "Not Wit' A Dealer" (Chuck D & Terminator X Remix)
- Released: August 2, 1990
- Recorded: 1989
- Studio: Marley Marl's House of Hits
- Venue: New York, NY
- Genre: Golden age hip hop
- Length: 5:24
- Label: First Priority, Atlantic Records
- Songwriters: Lana Moorer, Marlon Williams
- Producers: Marley Marl (original LP version), Ivan 'Doc' Rodriguez (single remix)

MC Lyte singles chronology
"Stop, Look, Listen" (1990)	"Cappucino" (1990)	"When in Love" (1991)

Music video
- "Cappucino" on YouTube

Cappucino is the third and final single from MC Lyte's album Eyes on This. It was published on August 2, 1990. In its single version it is a remix by Ivan "Doc" Rodríguez of the original version of the album produced by Marley Marl.

In this song MC Lyte seeks to warn about violence around drugs and addictions. In October 1990 it peaked No. 8 on the Billboard Hot Rap Singles, being her third consecutive single in the top 10 of that chart.

"Cappucino" was listed in the Rock Song Index: The 7500 Most Important Songs for the Rock and Roll Era (2005) by Bruce Pollock.

== Conception and composition ==
In the song Lyte tells how she goes to a cafe in Manhattan and once there she is murdered after being caught in the crossfire of rival drug dealers. So Lyte says she feels "on the other side/between lives", where she meets various people who have had deaths associated with violence and the use of alcohol and drugs. Later Lyte tells that everything has been part of a dream and that she was glad to realize this when she woke up, feeling everything as a warning message. Then she makes a description of the Cappuccino and ends the song saying that now she prefers tea because the Cappuccino seemed to "too fly for me".

The original version on the album is produced by Marley Marl, but the single version is a remix by Ivan 'Doc' Rodriguez. Another of the Remixes included in the single is produced by Chuck D and Terminator X from Public Enemy:

“The ‘Cappuccino’ remix came about from P.E. finding me to do their ‘Night of the Living Baseheads’ video. By that time I had already seen them perform at Latin Quarters and I became a big fan. So to get that call from them was like, ‘Wow, this is crazy…this is dope…this is hot!’”

=== Samples ===
The original version contains a sample of The Blackbyrds's "Spaced Out" bass. The remix incorporates vocal samples from The S.O.S. Band's "Just Be Good to Me" and The Dells's "Give Your Baby a Standing Ovation", the bass from Dennis Edwards with Siedah Garrett's "Don't Look Any Further" and drums from Fantasy Three "It's Your Rock". It also includes a sampling of Lyte herself on the charity single "Self Destruction".

== Music video ==
The music video was directed by Ric Menello, who had previously worked for the Beastie Boys and was released on November 1, 1990. For the video the remix of Ivan 'Doc' Rodriguez, who also has an appearance, was used.

In the book Icons of Hip Hop: An Encyclopedia of the Movement, Music, and Culture (2007), the writer Jennifer R. Young would comment on the video:

“Cappuccino” is another one of Lyte’s videos in which movement through the urban streets is essential to the storyline and video plot. Like Paper Thin, this video has many visual elements that suggest homage to the culture. Hip hop itself is likened to a funny valentine, one with unconventional beauty but undeniable appeal.”

It was included on his compilation video album Lyte Years (1991).

== Appearances ==
"Cappucino" was included in his compilation albums The Very Best of MC Lyte (2001), The Shit I Never Dropped (2003), and Cold Rock a Party - Best Of MC Lyte (2019).

On May 1, 1991, Lyte performs the song on "Yo! Unplugged Rap", the first MTV Unplugged to feature rap artists. Her performance was praised by Entertainment Weekly's Ken Tucker, who commented "MC Lyte performed her song ”Cappucino" like a rapping Aretha Franklin: Lyte brought out the soul in her lyrics."

== Critical reception ==
In his review of the album Eyes on This, critic Robert Christgau highlighted the song "the narrative tone of "Cappucino"—part fable, part metaphor, part confessional revery, part dumb it-was-only-a-dream—is avant-garde." For his part, Mike Boehm of the Los Angeles Times would comment

"With memorable, intelligently pointed story-songs such as "I Cram to Understand U" and "Cappucino", female rapper MC Lyte's peak material is several cuts above anything by Big Daddy Kane, Biz Markie and most other rappers.

Bruce Pollock listed the song in his book Rock Song Index: The 7500 Most Important Songs for the Rock and Roll Era (2005), which he described as "Spunky Brooklyn rapper visits the next world."

In hindsight, Damon Brown of RapReviews would criticize the song, commenting that "doesn’t even make any sense", while in his review of the album Alex Henderson of AllMusic considered Cappucino as "Undeniably, the CD's standout track".

== Single track listing ==
=== 12" Vinyl ===
==== A-Side ====
1. "Cappucino" (D.J. DOC Remix) (5:24)
  - Produced by Ivan 'Doc' Rodriguez
2. "Cappucino" (Remix Instrumental) (5:24)
  - Produced by Ivan 'Doc' Rodriguez

==== B-Side ====
1. "Not Wit' A Dealer" (Chuck D & Terminator X Remix) (4:00)
  - Produced by Chuck D and Terminator X
2. "Not Wit' A Dealer" (Audio Two Remix) (3:51)
  - Produced by Audio Two
3. "I Cram To Understand U 1990" (D.J. DOC Remix) (4:43)
  - Produced by Ivan 'Doc' Rodriguez

=== Cassette ===
==== A-Side ====
1. "Cappucino" (Edited Remix Version) (3:40)
  - Produced by Ivan 'Doc' Rodriguez

==== B-Side ====
1. "Not Wit' A Dealer" (Chuck D & Terminator X Remix) (4:00)
  - Produced by Chuck D and Terminator X

== Personnel ==
Credits are taken from the liner notes.

- Executive-Producer – Nat Robinson
- Lyrics By – MC Lyte (tracks: A1, A2)
- Lyrics By, Music By – Milk (pistas: B1, B2)
- Music By – Gizmo (tracks: B1, B2), Marley Marl (tracks: A1, A2)
- Written-By – Audio Two (tracks: B3), Lyte (tracks: B3)

== Charts ==
Chart (1990)	Peak position
US Hot Rap Songs (Billboard)	8
