= I'm Not Havin' It =

1989 single by Positive K and MC Lyte

- 7-inch vinyl of I'm Not Havin' It

Single by Positive K and MC Lyte

from the album The First Priority Music Family: Basement Flavor
- B-side: "A Good Combination"
- Released: August 1989
- Recorded: 1988
- Genre: Golden age hip hop
- Length: 3:29
- Label: First Priority Music, Atlantic Records
- Songwriters: Darryl Gibson, Lana Moorer, Kirk Robinson and Nathaniel Robinson Jr.
- Producer: Audio Two

MC Lyte singles chronology
"Lyte as a Rock" (1988)	"I'm Not Havin' It" (1989)	"Cha Cha Cha" (1989)

Positive K singles chronology
"Step Up Front" (1988)	"I'm Not Havin' It" (1989)	"Night Shift" (1991)

Music video
- "I'm Not Havin' It" on YouTube

"I'm Not Havin' It" is a song by American rappers Positive K and MC Lyte. It was included on the 1988 compilation album The First Priority Music Family: Basement Flavor and released as a single the following year. The B-side "A Good Combination", by Positive K as a solo artist, is the main song in some versions of the single.

Produced by rap duo Audio Two, on the song Positive K and Lyte have a rapping conversation in which she rejects his persistent courtship attempts.

Although Lyte had already charted outside the United States thanks to her collaboration with Irish singer Sinéad O'Connor on "I Want Your (Hands on Me)", with this song they both got their first appearance on a Billboard chart, peaking at No. 16 on the Hot Rap Singles in September of that year. In January 2019 they recorded a second version of the song.

== Conception and composition ==
Considered a safe-sex manifesto, in the song Positive K insistently tries to woo Lyte, who rejects him on the grounds that "guys are running games, like the New York Knicks", "guys like you just wanna hit and run" and "There's just certain things you don't understand baby/Every woman wants to be treated like a lady". On the hook of the song Positive K tells Lyte "Excuse me miss", to which she replies "No, I'm not havin' it".

As Positive K explained to Village People, at the time of creating the song "wanted to do something in rap that had never been seen before" and his main inspiration was the duets he grew up listening to such as Marvin Gaye and Tammi Terrell and Lionel Richie and Diana Ross's "Endless Love".

In August 1991, regarding the content of songs like I'm Not Havin' It and Please Understand, Lyte told Deborah Gregory in an Essence interview "I’ve never let a man dog me and I never will, It’s just not gonna happen!".

When asked about the recording of the song in a subsequent interview, Positive K responded "Always energentic! We were in the studio all the time! The vibe was great!!" In a 2018 interview for Weekly Rap Gods Positive K described the song as "the Adam and Eve of hip hop duos" and that it "set the tone for hip hop" in the work of other artists such as "Doin' It" by LL Cool J and "You're All I Need to Get By" by Method Man and Mary J Blige.

=== Samples ===
"I'm Not Havin' It" is built around a sample of Teddy Pendergrass's "Turn Off the Lights". The song also samples the hook from "Yes We Can Can" by Pointer Sisters.

== Appearances ==
I'm Not Havin' It was used in HIV prevention public service announcements and the Rock the Vote campaign.

Positive K would once again use the concept of 'I'm Not Havin' It for his 1992 hit "I Got a Man", in which Positive K wanted to collaborate with Lyte again, but could not do so due to his record label change. He also interpolates some of his lines in the song: in I Got a Man says "Ya better catch a flashback/Remember I'm not crabbin it/You know my style/From I'm Not Havin It", in reference to the line that says "But I'm all the way live, but I'm definitely not crabbing". Also says "C'mon I'm clean, cut, and dapper, you got to admit that" in reference to the fourth verse "Well, I'm clean cut and dapper, that's what I'm about".

In 1995 it was sampled by The Roots on the track "You Ain't Fly" from their second album Do You Want More?!!!??!

In 2003 the song was included in Lyte's compilation album The Shit I Never Dropped.

In January 2019, 30 years after its publication, Lyte collaborated on the Positive K single "I'm Still Not Havin 'It", which is a continuation of the original version. "I find it incredible that after 30 years MC Lyte and I haven’t skipped a beat” Positive K said in a press release. “We have just as much chemistry now as we did then. A duet album would be phenomenal." Lyte added, "Working with him is easy and effortless. The music from ‘Still Not Having It’ is one of my favorite songs from Bill Withers. It takes me back and with the subject matter Pos created, makes it MO Betta."

== Critical reception ==
In July 1990, black feminist author and cultural critic Michele Wallace wrote about the song in a note for the New York Times, later included in her book Dark Designs and Visual Culture (2004), in which she commented that in their dialogue Positive K and Lyte "comes down hard on the notion that women can’t say no, and criticizes the shallowness of the male rap."

In October 1996 Jon Shecter of Vibe called the song a forerunner of male and female duets in hip hop, highlighting when Positive K says "Excuse me, miss ..." on the hook as its most memorable part.

In 2018, The Boombox's Naima Cochrane commented on Positive K about her lyrics in Im not Havin'It and I Got a Man "despite his name, specialized in what could be called street harassment hip-hop."

== Track listing ==
=== 7" Vinyl ===
A-Side

1. "I'm Not Havin' It" (3:29)
  - MC Lyte And Positive K

B-Side

1. "A Good Combination" (3:53)
  - Positive K

== Personnel ==
Credits are taken from the liner notes.

- Engineer – Milk Dee (pistas: A)
- Producer – Audio Two, Positive K (track: B), Shaun Thomas (track: B)
- Written By – MC Lyte (track: A), Positive K

== Charts ==
Chart (1990)	Peak position
US Hot Rap Songs (Billboard)	16
