= I Don't Care: The Album =

Studio album by Audio Two
- Released: April 17, 1990
- Recorded: 1989–1990
- Studio: First Priority Labs
- Genre: Hip hop
- Length: 53:16
- Label: First Priority; Atlantic
- Producer: Nat Robinson, Sr. (exec.); Milk Dee; DJ Gizmo; The King of Chill; Terence Dudley

Audio Two chronology
What More Can I Say? (1988)	I Don't Care: The Album (1990)

Singles from I Don't Care: The Album
- 1. "On the Road Again" Released: 1990; 2. "I Get the Papers" Released: 1990

Professional ratings
Review scores
Source	Rating
AllMusic	2/5 stars
RapReviews	5/10

I Don't Care: The Album is the second and final studio album by American hip hop duo Audio Two. It was released in 1990 through First Priority Music with distribution by Atlantic Records. Production was handled by its members Milk Dee and DJ Gizmo along with the King of Chill and Terence Dudley. It features guest appearances from MC Lyte and Positive K. I Don't Care: The Album was not a success, only peaking at number 74 on the Top R&B/Hip-Hop Albums chart and spawning two singles: "On the Road Again" and "I Get the Papers". Its lead single, "On the Road Again", peaked at number 16 on the Hot Rap Songs chart.

A third studio album entitled First Dead Indian was set to be released in 1992 but was scrapped prior to its release and the duo would disband soon after, leaving I Don't Care: The Album as their final LP.

== Track listing ==
No.	Title	Length
1.	"On the Road Again / Interlude One"	4:31
2.	"Get Your Mother Off the Crack"	4:30
3.	"Undercover Hooker"	2:42
4.	"Worse Than a Gremlin"	2:03
5.	"Watcha' Lookin' At? / Interlude Two"	5:01
6.	"I Get the Papers"	2:57
7.	"Milk Does the Body Good"	4:35
8.	"Start It Up Y'All" (featuring MC Lyte and Positive K)	5:09
9.	"When Milk's on the Mic / Interlude Three"	3:08
10.	"Build Up Back Up"	1:32
11.	"The Nasty"	5:22
12.	"6teen" (featuring MC Lyte)	3:46
13.	"Step"	4:00
14.	"Many Styles"	3:57
Total length:		53:16

== Personnel ==
- Nathaniel V. "DJ Gizmo" Robinson Jr. – main artist, producer (tracks: 2, 4–8, 10–14), co-producer (track 1), programming, engineering, mixing (tracks: 1–2, 4–8, 10–14)
- Kirk S. "Milk Dee" Robinson – main artist, producer (tracks: 2, 4–8, 10–14), co-producer (track 1), programming, engineering, mixing (tracks: 1–2, 4–8, 10–14)
- Lana Michelle "MC Lyte" Moorer – vocals (tracks: 8, 12)
- Darryl "Positive K" Gibson – vocals (track 8)
- Freddie "The King Of Chill" Byrd – additional vocals (tracks: 5, 9, 13), producer & mixing (tracks: 3, 9)
- Guy Routte – additional vocals (track 6)
- Antoinette Guillopo – additional vocals (track 11)
- Madelline Serrano – additional vocals (track 11)
- DJ K-Rock – additional vocals (track 13)
- Terence Quentin Dudley – producer (track 1)
- El Bravador – co-producer (track 11)
- Nat Robinson Sr. – executive producer, management
- Carlton S. Batts – mastering
- Bob Defrin – art direction
- Lynn Kowalewski – design
- Jamie Christian – sleeve notes

== Chart history ==
Chart (1990)	Peak position
US Top R&B/Hip-Hop Albums (Billboard)	74
