= Lyte as a Rock (song) =

Single by MC Lyte

from the album Lyte as a Rock
- B-side: "Shut the Eff Up! (Hoe)"
- Released: 1988
- Recorded: 1988
- Genre: Golden age hip hop, Hip house
- Length: 4:30
- Label: First Priority, Atlantic Records
- Songwriter(s): Lana Moorer and Kirk Robinson
- Producer(s): Audio Two, King of Chill (House Mix)

MC Lyte singles chronology
"Paper Thin" (1988)	"Lyte as a Rock" (1988)	"I'm Not Havin' It" (1989)

Music video
- "Lyte as a Rock" on YouTube

"Lyte as a Rock" is a 1988 single from the album of the same name by American rapper MC Lyte. Although in its version on the album it is produced by Audio Two, the single and the music video use a house music mix produced by King of Chill. The song was composed by Lyte With Audio Two's Milk Dee.

In 2000 the song was part of the soundtrack of the Gina Prince-Bythewood movie Love & Basketball.

The song was performed by Lil' Kim at the MC Lyte tribute at the 2006 VH1 Hip Hop Honors.

== Content ==
In the song you hear a dialogue from producer King of Chill and Milk Dee from Audio Two talking about the meaning of "Lyte as a Rock":

Milk Dee: "Do you understand the metaphoric phrase 'Lyte as a Rock?' It's explaining, how heavy the young lady is You know what I'm saying King?"
King of Chill: "Yes my brother, but I would consider 'Lyte as a Rock' a simile because of the usage of the word 'as' And now.. directly from the planet of Brooklyn MC Lyte -- as a Rock!"

The B-side "Shut the Eff Up! (Hoe)" is a diss track to Hurby Azor's associate, Antoinette.

=== Samples ===
The song contains samples from vocals of Ashford & Simpson's "Solid" and drums from Tommy Roe's "Sweet Pea".

== Appearances ==
It was later included on the compilation album Cold Rock a Party – Best of MC Lyte (2019).

Later it was sampled in other songs of her like on "I Am the Lyte" from her second album Eyes on This (1989), "Ice Cream Dream (Remix 12")" (1992) and "The Wonder Years" (2006). It was also sampled in songs by others artists, such as De La Soul's "Cool Breeze on the Rocks" interlude on their album 3 Feet High and Rising and Gang Starr's "The Planet".

In 2000 the song was part of the soundtrack of the Gina Prince-Bythewood movie Love & Basketball.

The song was performed by Lil' Kim at the MC Lyte tribute at the 2006 VH1 Hip Hop Honors.

== Music video ==
The music video for the song, directed by Lionel C. Martin, shows MC Lyte rapping in different historical periods such as the Paleolithic period, as queen of ancient Egypt and as a member of a pro-black social movement and features a brief cameo by Irish singer Sinéad O'Connor. It was included on her compilation video album Lyte Years (1991).

== Critical reception ==
In 1999, Ego Trip's editors ranked "Lyte as a Rock (House Mix)" at No. 7 in their list of "10 Hip House Songs That Don't Suck" in Ego Trip's Book of Rap Lists.

In September 2004, as a result of a survey of over 200 musicians, songwriters, disc jockeys and radio programme producers, the song ranked No. 81 on the Top40-Charts Top 100 Greatest Hip-hop/Rap Singles of all time list.

In March 2016, XXL's Dominique Zonyee commented:

"She slapped the sexist game dead in the face with her groundbreaking single, "Lyte As a Rock." The iconic metaphor, as described in the first lines of the song, is symbolic for female MCs."

In 2018, on the 30th anniversary of its release, Albumism's Jesse Ducker reviewed the album Lyte as a Rock where he commented that with the song, MC Lyte "attempts to prove her lyrical dominance straight out the gate. Over the drums and organ from Tommy Roe's 'Sweet Pea', transmits directly from the Planet of Brooklyn, exhibiting complete mic dominance." He also considered the "more rugged" original version superior to the remix house.

== Track listing ==
=== 12" Vinyl ===
A-Side (Funky Side)

1. "Lyte as a Rock" (House Mix) (4:30)
  - Produced by King of Chill
2. "Lyte as a Rock" (Soul Shock Music) (4:50)

B-Side (Spunky Side)

1. "Lyte as a Rock" (Miami Mix) (3:16)
2. "Shut the Eff Up! (Hoe)" (5:49)

== Personnel ==
Credits are taken from the liner notes.

- Executive-Producer – Nat Robinson
- Mastered By – Dennis King (D.K.)
- Producer, Written-By – Audio Two (tracks: A2 to B2), King Of Chill (tracks: A1)
- Programmed By, Engineer, Music By [Music Performed By] – Audio Two
- Written-By – MC Lyte
