= I Cram to Understand U (Sam) =

1987 single by MC Lyte and DJ K-Rock

- Side A of the US 12-inch vinyl

Single by MC Lyte and DJ K-Rock

from the album Lyte as a Rock
- B-side: "Take It Lyte"
- Released: November 1987
- Recorded: 1987
- Genre: Golden age hip hop
- Length: 4:39
- Label: First Priority, Atlantic Records
- Songwriters: Lana Moorer and Kirk Robinson
- Producer: Audio Two

MC Lyte singles chronology
"I Cram to Understand U (Sam)" (1987)	"10% Dis" (1988)

"I Cram to Understand U (Sam)" is the debut single by American rapper MC Lyte, in which features their DJ, DJ K-Rock, released in November 1987. The song was part of her first album Lyte as a Rock, released the following year.

Produced by Milk Dee and DJ Gizmo from Audio Two, the song seeks to warn about the dangers of drug use and its impact on relationships.

In January 1998, the song was included on The Source's "The 100 Best Rap Singles of All Time" list.

== Conception and composition ==
"I Cram to Understand U (Sam)" was released in 1987 when Lyte was 16 years old, being the first recording released in her career. In it, she tells the story of meeting a man named Sam in 1981 who, while it seems he is cheating on her with another girl, turns out he is actually addicted to crack cocaine.

Considered by Mark Anthony Neal of PopMatters as one of the first songs about the crack era, it was written by Lyte at the age of 12.

“My mother used to work at North General Hospital in Harlem. Whenever I would go there would be a slew of heroin and crack addicts. (...) I would never want that for myself or any other young person that I knew so I was going to make it my responsibility to tell people about drugs so that they could avoid them at all costs.”

In Brian Coleman's book Check the Technique, Lyte has stated regarding the song: "I mixed in elements of reality, but in 1981 I was eleven years old and wasn't going anywhere near "Empire Boulevard". I didn't go there until I was fourteen. It was a roller rink—every Sunday it was Hip hop. Kurtis Blow and New Edition performed there, but mostly it was just roller-skating and great music."

The song was mixed by then Stetsasonic frontman Daddy O.

=== Samples ===
The song contains a sample of The Brothers Johnson's "Ain't We Funkin' Now". It also has an interpolation of "I'm in the Mood for Love" by Frances Langford, in which Lyte sings, "Look, I'm in the mood for love/Simply because you're near me."

== Appearances ==
"I Cram to Understand U" was included on her compilation albums The Very Best of MC Lyte (2001), Rhyme Masters (2005), Cold Rock a Party - Best Of MC Lyte (2019) and on the EastWest Maxi-Single "Lyte Of A Decade" (1996).

An Audio Two remix with Ivan "Doc" Rodriguez, "I Cram to Understand U (1990 Remix)", was included on her later single "Cappucino" and on her fourth album Ain't No Other (1993).

== Reception and influence ==
At the time of publication, Peter Watrous of The New York Times rated "I Cram to Understand U (Sam)" as one of the best 12-inch singles of the year, noting "Unlike the dozens of raps that are simply comic put-downs, Ms Lyte's plaintive tone and her self-deprecating story add up to a complex emotional statement." For his part, Mike Boehm of the Los Angeles Times would comment in 1990:

“With memorable, intelligently pointed story-songs such as "I Cram to Understand U (Sam)" and "Cappucino", female rapper MC Lyte's peak material is several cuts above anything by Big Daddy Kane, Biz Markie and most other rappers.”

In January 1998 "I Cram to Understand U (Sam)" was included by The Source in their list "The 100 Best Rap Singles of All Time".

In 1999, Ego Trip's editors ranked "I Cram to Understand U (Sam)" at No. 18 in their list of Hip Hop's 40 Greatest Singles by Year 1987 in Ego Trip's Book of Rap Lists.

In 2018, on the 30th anniversary of its release, Albumism's Jesse Ducker reviewed "Lyte as a Rock," in which he commented on the song:

“Though Lyte proves extremely capable at delivering braggadocio raps, she’s hardly a one-trick pony. In fact, her first single and the song that continued to influence her career was “I Cram To Understand U”. Over a solid drum-track she describes the increasingly shady and erratic behavior of her boyfriend. The song does effectively convey the feelings and thoughts that one goes through when they slowly discover that someone they love isn’t who they say they are, from denial to acceptance, but mostly anger.”

=== Samples ===
MC Lyte herself has sampled the song in her collaboration with Sinéad O'Connor on "I Want Your (Hands on Me)" (Street Mix) (1988), on her diss track "Shut the Eff Up! (Hoe)" from her second album Eyes on This (1989) and on "King of Rock" from her sixth album Seven & Seven (1998). It has also been sampled/referenced by several other artists:

- In 1992 Gang Starr sampled the song on the track "The Place Where We Dwell" from their album Daily Operation.
- In August 1992 the song was sampled by Masta Ace Incorporated on their single "Jeep Ass Niguh" from their album SlaughtaHouse. The song was again sampled by Masta Ace in 2001 on "Dopes, Pushers, Addicts".
- In December 1992 Positive K interpolated "I Cram to Understand U" on his hit I Got a Man. In the first verse, the female voice quote to the song singing "I'm not one of those girls that go rippin around".
- In October 1996 "I Cram to Understand U" was interpolated by Nas on his single "Street Dreams" from his album It Was Written. In the third verse he quotes the song saying "I knew the dopes, the pushers, the addicts, everybody"
- In 2000, the song was sampled by Prodigy on his single "Keep It Thoro" from his debut solo album H.N.I.C.
- In 2003 the song was interpolated by Missy Elliott on the track "Let It Bump" from her album This Is Not a Test! In the first verse, she refers to the beginning of the song saying "Remember when Lyte was in love wit Sam/I used to be in love wit this guy name Sam."
- In 2006, the song was sampled by Planet Asia on The Medicine on his track with Jonell "In Love With You".
- In 2012, the song was sampled by TV Girl on their full length mixtape "The Wild, The Innocent, The TV Shuffle" on their song "Sweaters"

== Single track listing ==
=== 7" Vinyl ===
==== A-Side ====
1. "I Cram To Understand U (Sam)" (4:39)

==== B-Side ====
1. "Take It Lyte" (2:47)

=== 12" Vinyl ===
==== A-Side ====
1. "I Cram To Understand U (Sam)" (Radio Version) (4:39)
2. "I Cram To Understand U (Sam)" (Acapella) (3:54)

==== B-Side ====
1. "I Cram To Understand U (Sam)" (Original) (4:39)
2. "I Cram To Understand U (Sam)" (Dub) (4:05)
3. "Take It Lyte" (2:47)

== Personnel ==
Credits are taken from the liner notes and the official page of the ASCAP.

- Written-By – Lana Moorer and Kirk Robinson
- Producer – Audio Two
- Mixed By – Daddy-O
- Mastered By – CSB ♪♪ (Carlton Batts)
- Executive-Producer – Nat Robinson
