= 10% Dis =

1988 single by MC Lyte

- 12-inch vinyl of "10% Dis"

Single by MC Lyte

from the album Lyte as a Rock
- B-side: "Kickin' 4 Brooklyn"
- Released: May 1988
- Recorded: 1988
- Studio: I.N.S. Studios
- Venue: New York, NY
- Genre: Golden age hip hop
- Length: 5:00
- Label: First Priority, Atlantic Records
- Songwriters: Lana Moorer, Kirk Robinson and Nathaniel Robinson Jr.
- Producer: Audio Two

MC Lyte singles chronology
"I Cram to Understand U (Sam)" (1987)	"10% Dis" (1988)	"Paper Thin" (1988)

"10% Dis" is a single from MC Lyte's album Lyte as a Rock produced by the hip hop duo Audio Two, who are also credited as songwriters.

The song was a diss track to then-Hurby Azor associate Antoinette, who she accuses of having "stole the beat" to the Audio Two hit "Top Billin'."

It is frequently mentioned among the best rap's diss track, both from the 1980s and in general, and has been sampled/referenced by various artists, such as A Tribe Called Quest, Tupac Shakur with Outlawz, Ras Kass, Bone Thugs-n-Harmony, Snoop Dogg, Lil' Kim, Foxy Brown, Common and Remy Ma.

In April 2013, the song was included No. 21 on Complex's "The 50 Best Rap Songs by Women" list.

== Conception and composition ==
During an interview with Vibe in 2011, Lyte stated that the feud started from a deal between a deal that was made between Hurby Luv Bug (Salt-N-Pepa's producer) and the rap duo Audio Two to record and release a song called 'Stop Illin' based on their hit song "Top Billin'."

"Hurby was taking pretty long to get it together so Audio Two figured it out that he wasn't going to do it. And then one night on a trip back from Boston after doing in-stores and performing, we had the radio on WBLS and heard Mr. Magic and Marley Marl playing [Antoinette's] 'I Got An Attitude.' It was the same [Audio Two] track, but it was organized a different way."

According to Lyte, they told her to write a diss track to Antoinette, as doing so would make them look like "the wackest men on the face of the planet." The song, recorded at the I.N.S. Studios in New York City, became a single from her debut album Lyte as a Rock.

"It was pretty easy—we just sat there and thought of the worst things we could possibly say about somebody," Lyte recalled in 2007 in Brian Coleman's book Check The Technique. "It's titled that because that's only ten percent of what I could have said. I didn't even know Antoinette. It was strictly a war on wax."

=== Samples ===
The song contains samples of Roxanne Shante's "Roxanne's Revenge" and the intro and drum break in the background comes from The Honey Drippers' "Impeach the President," James Brown's "Super Bad," and Audio Two's "Top Billin'."

== Appearances ==
"10% Dis" was included in his compilation albums The Very Best of MC Lyte (2001), The Shit I Never Dropped (2003), and Cold Rock a Party - Best Of MC Lyte (2019).

=== Samples ===
MC Lyte herself has sampled the song on her other diss track to Antoinette, "Shut the Eff Up! (Hoe)," and in her collaboration with Billy Lawrence on "Come On." It has also been sampled/referenced by several other artists:

- In 1991, was interpolated in A Tribe Called Quest's song "The Infamous Date Rape" from the album The Low End Theory. In the third verse, Q-Tip sings "Baby, baby, baby I don't wanna be rude/But I know because of your bloody attitude" in reference to the line of the song in which it says "30 days a month your mood is rude/We know the cause of your bloody attitude".
- In June 1996, 10% Dis was interpolated in Tupac Shakur and Outlawz's diss song "Hit 'Em Up," which insults to several East Coast rappers, chief among them, Biggie Smalls. In the fifth verse, E.D.I. Mean sings the chorus "Beat biter, dope style taker/Tell you to your face you ain't nothing but a faker" changing it to "You's a beat biter, a Pac style taker/I'll tell you to your face, you ain't shit but a faker". Also Tupac Shakur has a sample of the song in "Crooked Nigga Too".
- In November 1996 it was sampled by Ras Kass on the song "On Earth as It Is..." from his debut album Soul on Ice.
- In 1997, was interpolated in Bone Thugs-n-Harmony's song "U Ain't Bone" from the album The Art of War. At the beginning of the second verse, Layzie Bone sings the chorus "Beat biter, dope style taker/Tell you to your face you ain't nothing but a faker" changing it to "They beat biters, dope-style takers/When I see you face-to-face/My nigga, I'm a treat you like a hater".
- Snoop Dogg interpolates 10% Dis in his collaboration with N.W.A in "Chin Check" (1999). In the fourth verse he refers to the song saying "God damn hoes, here we go again"
- In 1999, is interpolated on Mobb Deep's remix of Quiet Storm with Lil Kim, who used her guest verse to diss rapper Foxy Brown. She would reply in his collaboration with Capone-N-Noreaga in "Bang, Bang" (2000), which would also have an interpolation to 10% Dis. In the third verse he quotes the intro of the song singing "Hot damn ho, here we go again/Pop shit like a cock, +Lyte+ weight as your +Rocks+, bitch."
- Another diss track by Foxy Brown, this time against Queen Latifah and Queen Pen, would be titled "10% Dis" in reference to the song.
- In 2009, was sampled by Asher Roth on his hit song "I Love College."
- In 2016, the song is sampled on Common and Stevie Wonder's song "Black America Again".
- In 2018, 10% Dis is interpolated for Remy Ma and Chris Brown's single "Melanin Magic."

== Legacy and influence ==
=== Critical reception ===
Complex's Rob Kenner would write about the song "MC Lyte's "10% Dis" was 100% effective (...) As the step-sister of Brooklyn's own Giz and Milk from Audio Two, Lyte had access to the hottest beats, and she was also exempt from any sort of pressure to sleep her way to the top, demanding and receiving maximum respect from all men she encountered in this testosterone-soaked industry." Later they would comment in the same media "(...)The track featured a multitude of now-classic lines such as "hot damn hoe, here we go again" and "you're a beat biter, a dope style taker." Ironically, the beat for "10% Dis" sounded more like "Top Billin" than "I Got an Attitude" did." For his part, Rob Marriott would comment on the song "10% Dis is pure, unrelenting devastation - Ether before Ether."

On the 30th anniversary of its release, Albumism's Jesse Ducker reviewed "Lyte as a Rock," in which he commented on the song:

"Throughout her career, MC Lyte has always excelled at recording dis tracks. On Lyte as a Rock she unleashes her first and perhaps best with "10% Dis," her extremely harsh assault on the rapper Antoinette. (...) MC Lyte deliberately dissects Antoinette with a mixture of cold calculation and contempt throughout the six verses of "10% Dis."

In December 2018, Eminem included the song in the list of his favorite diss tracks.

=== Accolades ===
Publication	Country	Accolade	Year	Rank
Billboard	U.S.	The Best Hip-Hop Diss Tracks From the '80s	2018	*
Complex	U.S.	The 50 Best Hip-Hop Diss Songs	2018	#26
Complex	U.S.	The 50 Best Rap Songs by Women	2013	#21
Ego Trip	U.S.	Hip Hop's 40 Greatest Singles by Year 1980–98	1999	#17
VH1	U.S.	The 10 Most Brutal Lady Diss Tracks In Hip Hop	2013	*
(*) designates lists which are unordered.

== Single track listing ==
=== 7" Vinyl ===
==== A-Side (Rough Side) ====
1. "10% Dis" (5:00)

==== B-Side (Tough Side) ====
1. "Kickin' 4 Brooklyn" (2:21)

=== 12" Vinyl ===
==== A-Side (Rough Side) ====
1. "10% Dis" (Radio Version) (5:00)
2. "10% Dis" (Acapella) (4:30)

==== B-Side (Tough Side) ====
1. "10% Dis" (Original) (5:00)
2. "Kickin' 4 Brooklyn" (2:21)

== Personnel ==
Credits are taken from the liner notes.

- Written-By – MC Lyte, Gizmo (A1 to B1), Milk Dee
- Producer – Audio Two
- Executive-Producer – Nat Robinson
