= Cha Cha Cha (MC Lyte song) =

Single by MC Lyte

from the album Eyes on This
- B-side: "Housepower"
- Released: September 8, 1989
- Recorded: 1989
- Genre: Golden age hip hop
- Length: 3:02
- Label: First Priority, Atlantic Records
- Songwriter: Freddie Byrd
- Producer: King Of Chill

MC Lyte singles chronology
"I'm Not Havin' It" (1989)	"Cha Cha Cha" (1989)	"Stop, Look, Listen" (1990)

Music video
- "Cha Cha Cha on YouTube

Cha Cha Cha is the lead single from MC Lyte's second album Eyes on This. Produced by King Of Chill, who also has songwriting credits, it was released on September 8, 1989.

The song stayed 18 weeks on the recently created Billboard Hot Rap Singles and became one of the first songs to peak at No. 1 on that chart, staying there for two weeks in December 1989. Although MC Lyte had already reached #1 on Rap chart a few months earlier with the collaborative single "Self Destruction", this was the first time that a woman had achieved it as the lead artist. In turn, it would also become Lyte's first appearance on the Billboard Hot R&B/Hip-Hop (then called "Billboard Hot Black Singles"), peaking No. 35.

In 2008 "Cha Cha Cha" was No. 54 on VH1's 100 Greatest Songs of Hip Hop list and Lil' Kim performed a rewritten version on her mixtape, Ms. G.O.A.T.

== Conception and composition ==
Although the song's credits only feature King of Chill as the songwriter, MC Lyte stated that they wrote the song together:

“There were occasions like a song like ‘Cha Cha Cha’ King of Chill wrote that with me. I didn’t have a problem with opening the door to someone writing with me at times. But I had to have my stamp in it, on it and all round it because I’m not just saying whatever someone writes.”

Also comment about the lyrics:

“There were some things that were humorous in there that I didn’t write or didn’t like or thought was the hottest line I ever said. It was comical to me…like that line, ‘Well, well, well, I’ll be damned.’ But turned out that that’s one of the most memorable parts of ‘Cha Cha Cha.’ Whenever I perform it that’s the part that the whole crowd wants to say. So sometimes you have to get out of yourself and let a new way of approaching a rhyme happen.”

=== Samples ===
The song contains samples of Four Tops's "I Can't Live Without You" bass part, Kraftwerk's "The Man-Machine" lead synth part, Funkadelic's "Good Old Music"'s drum, Cerrone's "Rocket in the Pocket"'s drum, and The Fearless Four's "Rockin' It" hook. The song also has a vocal interpolation of herself on "Kickin' 4 Brooklyn" from her debut album.

== Music video ==
The music video for the song, directed by Tamra Davis, was filmed in August 1989 on Randall's Island, New York City. In the video, shot almost entirely in black and white, Lyte is shown alongside her bodyguard, her DJ K-Rock, and her dancers Leg One and Leg Two.

It was included on her compilation video album Lyte Years (1991).

== Appearances ==
"Cha Cha Cha" was included in his compilation albums The Very Best of MC Lyte (2001), The Shit I Never Dropped (2003), Rhyme Masters (2005), Rhino Hi-Five: MC Lyte (2007), Cold Rock a Party - Best Of MC Lyte (2019) and on the EastWest Maxi-Single "Lyte Of A Decade" (1996).

In the fall of 1991 she performed the song at the Pay-per-view TV concert Sisters In The Name of Rap.

The song was performed by Da Brat and Remy Ma at the MC Lyte tribute at the 2006 VH1 Hip Hop Honors.

The song was also featured on the soundtrack of the video game Grand Theft Auto IV on the fictional in-game station "The Classics 104.1".

In October 2008 she performed "Cha Cha Cha" at the 3rd edition of the BET Hip Hop Awards.

On October 14, 2014, MC Lyte performed this song to President Barack Obama in the celebration of the 50th anniversary of the legislation that created the National Endowment for the Humanities and the National Endowment for the Arts.

== Legacy and influence ==
In his book Icons of Hip Hop: An Encyclopedia of the Movement, Music, and Culture (2007) writer Mickey Hess commented on the song "is an early example of her competing not as a female MC, but as an MC. In this song, she includes the audience as part of her battle strategy. Unlike some of her other songs in which she attacks a rapper or a crew of rappers, this song is a general warning to her competition. Considered an ultimate dis song, Lyte references hip hop and lyricism as if it is a science, a complex skill that few have mastered. The song does not have violent images, yet delivers punishment. The defeat for competitors is in the realization that they are not smart enough to outwit her."

In 2009, PopMatters's Quentin B. Huff reviewed the song in his note "I still love H.E.R. (and so should everyone else)", commenting:

"(MC Lyte) tenor of voice and the precision of her delivery make her undeniable, not to mention her willingness to try a variety of subject matter. Despite the variety, however, she is well suited to battle mode where she can verbally stomp her competition. "Cha Cha Cha" is that type of song, but the execution is so smooth, with one of the slinkiest bass lines in all of rap, that she accomplishes her mission without being menacing. At the same time, she naturally sounds a bit like a mobster from an old black-and-white movie. I can easily see her pulling a Humphrey Bogart and saying something like, "Move kid, ya botha me. Am-scray, will ya?" "Cha Cha Cha" is more subdued and matter of fact than "I'm Bad", LL Cool J's earnest tribute to his lyrical skill."

Jack White revealed the song as the primary inspiration behind his 2014 Grammy–nominated song "Lazaretto".

In October 2019, on the 30th anniversary of its release, Albumism's Jesse Ducker reviewed "Eyes of This," in which he commented that "Cha Cha Cha" is one of the best songs Lyte has ever released. Though the beat intentionally evokes old school hip-hop, sampling The Fearless Four's "Rockin' It" synthesizer-based loop and the drum/guitar break from Cerrone's "Rocket In the Pocket", it still feels futuristic even three decades later."

=== Accolades ===
Publication	Country	Accolade	Year	Rank
Ego Trip	U.S.	Hip Hop's 40 Greatest Singles by Year 1980–98	1999	#27
The Boombox	U.S.	50 Greatest Songs By Female Rappers	2017	#15
VH1	U.S.	100 Greatest Songs of Hip Hop	2008	#54
Vibe	U.S.	The BIG List: Rap’s 30 Most Powerful Album Intros	2010	#28
(*) designates lists which are unordered.

=== Samples ===
- In 1999, it was sampled by Ugly Duckling on "Get on This" from their EP Fresh Mode.
- In 2002 "Cha Cha Cha" was sampled in 7L & Esoteric's second EP release, Dangerous Connection, on a track called "Word Association".
- In 2003 it was interpolated by Da Brat on the track "Who I Am" from her fourth album Limelite, Luv & Niteclubz.
- In 2004 it was interpolated by Shawnna on the track "Kick This One" from her debut album Worth tha Weight.
- In February 2008, Rick Ross makes an interpolation to Cha Cha Cha in his collaboration with T-Pain on "The Boss", in which he says "I'm the biggest boss that you seen thus far" in reference to the line"I'm the dopest female that you've heard thus far".
- In June 2008 Lil' Kim rewrites "Cha Cha Cha" for her song "Ms. G.O.A.T." from her homonym mixtape album. Among the modifications that his version had, in the first verse Lil 'Kim sings "Do my thing with an '89 swing/The dopeness I write, I guarantee delight/To the hip-hop maniac, the Uptown brainiac/In full effect, MC Lyte is back" changing it to "Shake my thing all the boys start to sing/Shawty is a ten, think about me in his dreams/Nymphomanic, head like a brainiac/For those who slept Lil' Kim is back".

== Single track listing ==
=== 7" Vinyl ===
==== A-Side ====
1. "Cha Cha Cha" (3:00)

==== B-Side ====
1. "Housepower" (3:50)

=== 12" Vinyl ===
==== A-Side ====
1. "Cha Cha Cha" (3:00)
2. "Cha Cha Cha" (Instrumental) (3:00)

==== B-Side ====
1. "Housepower (12" Mix)" (11:42)

=== Cassette ===
==== A-Side ====
1. "Cha Cha Cha" (3:00)
2. "Housepower" (11:42)

==== B-Side ====
1. "Cha Cha Cha" (3:00)
2. "Housepower" (11:42)

== Personnel ==
Credits are taken from the liner notes.

- Producer, Mixed By, Lyrics By, Music By – King of Chill
- Mastered By – Dennis King (D.K.)
- Executive-Producer – Nat Robinson

== Charts ==
Chart (1989–90)	Peak position
US Hot R&B/Hip-Hop Songs (Billboard)	35
US Hot Rap Songs (Billboard)	1

== See also ==
- List of Billboard number-one rap singles of the 1980s and 1990s
