= Da Undaground Heat, Vol. 1 =

Studio album by MC Lyte
- Released: March 18, 2003
- Recorded: 2002–2003
- Genre: Hip hop
- Label: iMusic
- Producer: Maad Phunk, Gerard Harmon, Fred Crawford, Keith Wilkins, MC Lyte

MC Lyte chronology
The Very Best of MC Lyte (2001)	Da Undaground Heat, Vol. 1 (2003)	The Shit I Never Dropped (2003)

Professional ratings
Review scores
Source	Rating
AllMusic	2.5/5 stars
Entertainment Weekly	B+
RapReviews	4.5/10
Rolling Stone	2/5 stars
The Source	2.5/5 stars

Da Undaground Heat, Vol. 1 is the seventh studio album and ninth album released overall by MC Lyte. It was released on March 18, 2003, through iMusic and was produced by Maad Phunk, Gerard Harmon, Fred Crawford, Keith Wilkins and MC Lyte.

Da Undaground Heat was MC Lyte's first independent album and her first studio release after her departure from EastWest Records five years prior. The album peaked at No. 95 on the Top R&B/Hip-Hop Albums chart in the U.S.

== Track listing ==
1. "Intro" – 2:55 (featuring Jamie Foxx)
2. "Ride Wit Me" – 3:34
3. "What Ya'll Want" – 3:42
4. "Phone Check 1 Interlude" – 1:23 (featuring Biz Markie, Naughty by Nature, Queen Latifah)
5. "Fire" – 3:34
6. "Bklyn (Live That)" – 3:38
7. "Lyte Tha Emcee Pt. 2" – 3:34
8. "Phone Check 2 Interlude" – 0:55 (featuring Janet Jackson, Milk Dee)
9. "Where Home Is" – 4:11 (featuring Jamie Foxx)
10. "Phone Check 3 Interlude" – 1:03 (featuring Spliff Star)
11. "U Got It" – 3:07
12. "God Said Lyte" – 3:26
13. "Phone Check 4 Interlude Outro" – 2:43 (featuring Big Tigger, Jamie Foxx)
14. "Ride Wit Me" (Clean Edit) – 3:37
15. "U Can't Stop It" – 3:29 (Lee Majors, Hot Dyse)
16. "Supastar" – 4:00
17. "God Said Lyte" (A Cappella Version) – 3:21

== Charts ==
Chart (2003)	Peak position
US Top R&B/Hip-Hop Albums (Billboard)	95
