= The Very Best of MC Lyte =

Greatest hits album by MC Lyte
- Released: September 4, 2001
- Recorded: 1988–2001
- Genre: Hip hop
- Length: 53:57
- Label: Rhino Entertainment, Atlantic Records
- Producer: Audio Two, Marley Marl, Grand Puba, Jermaine Dupri, Epic Mazur, Richard Wolf, Wreckx-N-Effect, The Hitmen, The King of Chill, DJ Doc, Foster & McElroy

MC Lyte chronology
Seven & Seven (1998)	The Very Best of MC Lyte (2001)	Da Undaground Heat, Vol. 1 (2003)

Professional ratings
Review scores
Source	Rating
AllMusic	4.5/5 stars
The New Rolling Stone Album Guide	4/5 stars

The Very Best of MC Lyte is a compilation album by MC Lyte. It was released on September 4, 2001, for Atlantic Records and Rhino Entertainment. The album featured songs from each of her studio albums except Seven & Seven.

== Track listing ==
No.	Title	Length
1.	"10% Dis"	5:02
2.	"I Cram to Understand U (Sam)" (with DJ K-Rock)	4:44
3.	"Paper Thin"	5:14
4.	"Kickin' 4 Brooklyn"	2:22
5.	"Dr. Soul" (Foster & McElroy feat. MC Lyte)	4:36
6.	"Cha Cha Cha"	3:01
7.	"Cappucino"	3:55
8.	"I Am the Lyte"	4:02
9.	"Shut the Eff Up! (Hoe)"	5:48
10.	"Stop, Look, Listen" (with DJ K-Rock)	3:15
11.	"Poor Georgie"	4:30
12.	"When in Love"	3:58
13.	"Eyes Are the Soul"	3:54
14.	"Ruffneck"	3:57
15.	"Keep on, Keepin' On" (feat. Xscape)	4:31
16.	"Cold Rock a Party (Bad Boy Remix)" (feat. Missy Elliott)	4:37
