= What More Can I Say? =

Studio album by Audio Two
- Released: June 7, 1988
- Recorded: 1986–1988
- Studios: I.N.S. (New York, NY); Such-A-Sound (Brooklyn, NY); First Priority Lab (Staten Island, NY)
- Genre: Hip hop
- Length: 37:55
- Labels: First Priority; Atlantic
- Producers: DJ Gizmo; Milk Dee; Daddy-O; the King of Chill

Audio Two chronology
Flip-Flop Mini-Album (1986)	What More Can I Say? (1988)	I Don't Care: The Album (1990)

Singles from What More Can I Say?
- 1. "Make It Funky/Top Billin'" Released: October 15, 1987; 2. "Hickeys Around My Neck" Released: 1988; 3. "Many Styles / The Questions" Released: 1988; 4. "I Don't Care" Released: 1988

What More Can I Say? is the debut studio album by American hip hop duo Audio Two. It was released in 1988 through First Priority Records with distribution by Atlantic Records. The recording sessions took place at I.N.S. Studios, Such-A-Sound Studio and First Priority Lab, in New York City. The album was produced by members Milk Dee and DJ Gizmo with Daddy-O and the King of Chill. It peaked at No. 185 on the Billboard 200 and No. 45 on the Top R&B/Hip-Hop Albums chart in the United States. What More Can I Say? spawned four singles: "Make It Funky"/"Top Billin'", "Hickeys Around My Neck", "Many Styles"/"The Questions", and "I Don't Care". The song "I Like Cherries" was previously released on Flip-Flop Mini-Album, a 1986 split mini-LP dropped with the Alliance (King of Chill, Kool C and D.J. Dice).

== Critical reception ==
Professional ratings
Review scores
Source	Rating
AllMusic	3/5 stars
The Philadelphia Inquirer	3/4 stars

The Philadelphia Inquirer stated that the album, "while uneven, confirms [Audio Two's] uncommonly articulate approach to rap."

== Track listing ==
No.	Title	Writer(s)	Producer(s)	Length
1.	"Top Billin'" (featuring Daddy-O)	Nat Robinson; Kirk Robinson	Audio Two; Daddy-O	2:52
2.	"What More Can I Say?"	Glenn Bolton	Audio Two	4:39
3.	"When the 2 Is on the Mic"	Nat Robinson; Kirk Robinson	Audio Two	3:19
4.	"I Like Cherries"	Nat Robinson; Kirk Robinson	Audio Two	3:51
5.	"I Don't Care"	Nat Robinson; Kirk Robinson	Audio Two	4:04
6.	"Giz Starts Buggin'"	Nat Robinson; Kirk Robinson	Audio Two	3:08
7.	"Make It Funky" (featuring Daddy-O)	Nat Robinson; Kirk Robinson	Audio Two; Daddy-O	5:02
8.	"Hickeys Around My Neck"	Nat Robinson; Kirk Robinson	Audio Two	3:49
9.	"Put It 2 Music"	Nat Robinson; Kirk Robinson	Audio Two	1:10
10.	"Top Billin'" (Instrumental)	Nat Robinson; Kirk Robinson	Audio Two; Daddy-O	3:00
11.	"The Questions" (featuring the King of Chill)	Nat Robinson; Kirk Robinson; Freddie Byrd	Audio Two; the King of Chill	3:01
Total length:				37:55

== Personnel ==
- Nathaniel V. "DJ Gizmo" Robinson Jr. – main artist, producer, executive producer
- Kirk S. "Milk Dee" Robinson – main artist, producer, engineering
- Glenn K. "Daddy-O" Bolton – featured artist & producer (tracks: 1, 7, 10)
- Freddie "The King of Chill" Byrd – featured artist & producer (track 11)
- Shlomo Sonnenfeld – engineering
- Phil DeMartino – engineering
- Gary Clugston – engineering
- Dan Sheehan – engineering
- Yoram Vazan – engineering
- Bob Defrin – art direction
- Shirt King – artwork
- Carol Bobolts – design
- John Pinderhughes – photography

== Chart history ==
Chart (1988)	Peak position
US Billboard 200	185
US Top R&B/Hip-Hop Albums (Billboard)	45
