= Paper Thin (MC Lyte song) =

1988 single by Mc Lyte

- Side A of the US 12-inch vinyl

Single by MC Lyte

from the album Lyte as a Rock
- B-side: "Spare The Rod"
- Released: 1988
- Recorded: 1988
- Genre: Golden age hip hop
- Length: 5:15
- Label: First Priority, Atlantic Records
- Songwriters: Lana Moorer, Freddie Byrd
- Producer: King of Chill

MC Lyte singles chronology
"10% Dis" (1988)	"Paper Thin" (1988)	"Lyte as a Rock" (1988)

Music video
- "Paper Thin" on YouTube

"Paper Thin" is the third single from MC Lyte's debut album Lyte as a Rock. It is produced by King of Chill, who along with Lyte has songwriting credits.

The song, which is about Lyte confronting her boyfriend over infidelity, became an underground hit, selling 125,000 copies in the first six months with virtually no radio play.

In 2003, The Source placed Paper Thin No. 24 in their list "Top 151 Rap Songs of All-Time". In April 2013, the song was included No. 8 on Complex's "The 50 Best Rap Songs by Women" list. Paper Thin was ranked No. 23 on About.com's The 100 Best Rap Songs of All Time list.

The song has also been covered/reinterpreted by other rappers like Bahamadia, Puff Daddy and Missy Elliott.

== Conception and composition ==
In an interview with Rolling Stone, MC Lyte says she wrote the lyrics to "Paper Thin" in her rhyme book long before recorded the song "probably '82" at 12 or 13 years old. Lyte also tells that the lyrics are not based on her own personal experiences.

"(...) I didn’t have my first boyfriend until I was 14. But it was just pulling things from what I had seen, what I had heard. It’s amazing what a kid can learn in the company of adults and just listening to them talk."

"Paper Thin" was produced by King of Chill of the rap group Alliance, who also has songwriting credits. According to an interview with King of Chill in 2019, the initial production work was done in his family's apartment with a Alesis drum machine, and followed by mixing at Firehouse Studio in Brooklyn Heights. The producer has also stated that the success of the song was a "dream come true"

"The goal when you start rappin' is to be the coolest dude on your block and in the neighborhood. But after a while, you tryin' to be heard in the clubs that you frequent, which is Latin Quarter, Union Square, Rooftop, places like that. At the point to now we can hand the record to the deejay, and it's not a hassle for them to play it. You couldn't be nobody and hand the record to the deejay. So we get to "Paper Thin", and he puts it on, and it's just lightin' up the dance floor, that was the greatest thing! Not only that, we had a video to support it on [local cable rap show] Video Music Box, which was our MTV, that was the greatest."

=== Samples ===
The song contains samples of Prince's "17 Days" bass intro, Al Green's "I'm Glad You're Mine"'s drum, and Earth, Wind & Fire's "Shining Star" hook. The song also has a chorus interpolation from Ray Charles' "Hit the Road Jack", in which Lyte changes "Jack" to "Sam."

== Music video ==
The music video for the song, directed by Lionel C. Martin, was filmed at the New York Transit Museum in Brooklyn and features cameos by, among others the clothing designer urban April Walker, D-Nice, DJ Jazzy Joyce, MC Serch of the rap group 3rd Bass and their DJ K-Rock.

During an interview with Rolling Stone Lyte commented on the making of the video "It was fun. It was a quick shoot. We probably went from about 9 in the morning till about 7. It was very different from 'Lyte As a Rock,' because 'Lyte As a Rock' was a 24-hour video. We worked 24 hours around the clock for that video 'cause there were so many different setups. But with 'Paper Thin' it was quite simple. Had a train full of people that that I knew and that were very supportive of my career, so they came in."

In the book Icons of Hip Hop: An Encyclopedia of the Movement, Music, and Culture (2007), the writer Jennifer R. Young would comment on the video:

"Her music videos convey these interests in promoting intelligent, respectful images of women. From her first video "Paper Thin," where she is fully clothed in a sweatsuit, turtle neck, jacket, and boots, Lyte seemed more concerned with the delivery of her art than any ill modification of her body.

Like other videos in the late 1980s, Lyte’s use of the subway station and the actual train suggest her affection for the environment from which she came. There is nothing glossy about the video set, which is indeed a subway station.

Dirty stairs and subway platforms, graffiti walls, haggard subway riders, coated windows, and unpolished stainless steel poles all add texture to the video. However, the video is part of the natural elements of the underground, not the other way around. The use of subway trains in early rap videos should not be overlooked. More than just a low-budget decision, video directors who had some, if not a lot of, input from rap artists tapped into a train metaphor whose meaning may have changed, but whose aesthetic traditions stayed intact. Twentieth-century rap videos were not the first to use trains. Black visual artists from the Reconstruction period forward have used trains as an artistic symbol of change. Visual artist Romare Bearden (1911-1988), for instance, is known for incorporating locomotives into his paintings, water-colors, collages, and murals. The train is said to impart several meanings: the migration patterns of African Americans moving from south to north, the upward mobility of an oppressed people, and the overall promise of a better future. The video "Paper Thin" is postmodern in the way that it contributes to hip hop culture, where subways indicate the music’s origins (even borough specific), the audience’s originality, the art’s potency, and the rapper’s resolve despite limited resources and bleak surroundings."

It was included on her compilation video album Lyte Years (1991).

== Appearances ==
"Paper Thin" was included in her compilation albums The Very Best of MC Lyte (2001), The Shit I Never Dropped (2003), Rhyme Masters (2005), and Cold Rock a Party - Best Of MC Lyte (2019). The single has also been reissued in 2003.

In 1996, Bahamadia recorded a cover of the song.

MF Doom has made a remix of the song on his remix album Special Blends Volume 1 & 2 (2004).

MC Lyte performed this song in her tribute at the 2006 VH1 Hip Hop Honors.

== Legacy and influence ==
=== Critical reception ===
In the book That's the Joint !: The Hip Hop Study Reader (2003), sociologist Tricia Rose commented on the song:

"MC Lyte's underground hit, "Paper Thin", is one of the most scathing raps about male dishonesty/infidelity and the tensions between trust and vulnerability. Lyte has been burned by Sam, but she has turned her experience into a black woman's anthem that sustains an uncomfortable balance between brutal cynicism and honest vulnerability (...) Lyte's public acknowledgment that Sam's expressions of love were paper thin is not a source of embarrassment for her, but a means of empowerment. Lyte presents commitment, vulnerability and sensitivity as assets, not indicators of female weakness."

Hip hop magazine The Source joked that the song "Introduced toe sucking to an unwitting generation". In June 2012, WQHT's Peter Rosenberg would review the song for Complex commenting "Classic beat, classic Lyte.(...) MC Lyte is the number one female MC of all time. And it's exemplified of 'Paper Thin'". For the same media Rob Kenner reviewed "MC Lyte is one of the greatest rappers of any gender in hip-hop history ( ...) Aside from the battle rap "10% Dis," the album's standout track was this song, in which Lyte puts a two-timing loverboy in check. Unconcerned with inflaming her listeners' sexual urges, Lyte was always confident that her lyrics were more than enough."

On the 30th anniversary of its release, Albumism's Jesse Ducker reviewed "Lyte as a Rock," in which he commented on the song:

"Paper Thin," is one of the best hip-hop breakup tracks ever recorded. Hell hath no fury like Lyte scorned, as she lambasts an ex that she discovered cheating on her. She reiterates her strength and independence by assuring those that she has no intentions of ever using men for their money, flying in the face of the way many women were portrayed in hip-hop tracks throughout the ’80s, ’90s, and, if we’re being honest, today."

Henry Adaso of About.com rated that with Paper Thin Lyte "solidified her status as the new queen in town." In 2018, thirty years after its publication, Christopher R. Weingarten of Rolling Stone magazine reviewed "Paper Thin", calling it an "iconic hip-hop hit" and "Machismo-slaying anthem." For his part, Troy Smith from Cleveland.com would write in 2021 "MC Lyte was the first female emcee who could hang with the boys. That was clear from her lyrical talent. But she took things to the next level on 'Paper Thin', a song that smacks down egotistical men in epic fashion."

=== Accolades ===
Publication	Country	Accolade	Year	Rank
About.com	U.S.	The 100 Best Rap Songs of All Time	2018	23
Cleveland.com	U.S.	100 Greatest Rap Verses Of All Time	2018	70
Cleveland.com	U.S.	200 Greatest Hip-hop Songs Of All Time	2021	111
Complex	U.S.	Peter Rosenberg's 25 Favorite Female Rap Songs	2012	2
Complex	U.S.	The 50 Best Rap Songs by Women	2013	8
Ego Trip	U.S.	Hip Hop's Greatest Singles by Year 1980–1998	1999	29
The Source	U.S.	Top 151 Hip Hop Songs of All-Time	2003	24
(*) designates lists which are unordered.

=== Samples ===
- In 1992, X-Clan sampled the song on "Holy Rum Swig" from their album Xodus.
- In February 1993, English boyband Take That sampled "Paper Thin" on their single "Why Can't I Wake Up with You".
- In September 1993, De La Soul interpolated the song in "Area" on their album Buhloone Mindstate. In the third verse, Posdnuos sings "A-hah, a-hah, a-hah/Sucker you missed, I put all feelings aside, I know who I am" changing it to "A-hah, a-hah, a-hah/(We whooped that ass) And put the feelings aside, I know who I am".
- In 1999 was sampled by Puff Daddy on his song with Redman "Fake Thugs Dedication" from his album Forever.
- In 2003, Missy Elliott rewrote "Paper Thin" for her verse in her collaboration with Timbaland & Magoo on the single "Cop That Shit".

== Single track listing ==
=== 12" Vinyl ===
==== A-Side ====
1. "Paper Thin" (Radio Version) (5:00)
2. "Paper Thin" (Remix) (2:55)
  - Produced by Audio Two
3. "Paper Thin" (Remix) (3:25)
  - Produced by Alliance

==== B-Side ====
1. "Paper Thin" (Instrumental) (2:53)
2. "Paper Thin" (Acapella) (2:25)
3. "Spare The Rod" (4:26)

== Personnel ==
Credits are taken from the liner notes.

- Written By – MC Lyte (tracks A1 to B2), First Priority Crew (tracks: B3), King Of Chill (tracks: A1 to B2)
- Producer – King Of Chill
- Mastered By – Carlton Batts (CSB)
- Executive Producer – Nat Robinson
