= Seven & Seven (MC Lyte album) =

Studio album by MC Lyte
- Released: August 18, 1998
- Recorded: 1997–1998
- Studio: Electric Lady Studios (New York, NY); Quad Recording Studios (New York, NY); Capitol Studios (Hollywood, CA); Record Plant (New York, NY); 2 Ton Sound (New York, NY); Chung King Studios (New York, NY); The Hit Factory; Far East Digital/Einstein Lab; Unique Recording Studios (New York, NY); Westlake Recording Studios (Los Angeles, CA); First Priority Labs (Staten Island, NY)
- Genre: Hip hop
- Length: 1:17:19
- Label: East West
- Producer: Giovanni Salah; L.E.S.; LL Cool J; Marc Kinchen; Milk Dee; Missy "Misdemeanor" Elliott; Peter Panic; Ralph Roundtree; Ron "Amen-Ra" Lawrence; the Neptunes; Trackmasters

MC Lyte chronology
Badder Than B-Fore (1997)	Seven & Seven (1998)	The Very Best of MC Lyte (2001)

Singles from Seven & Seven
- 1. "I Can't Make a Mistake" Released: September 12, 1998; 2. "It's All Yours" Released: 1998

Seven & Seven is the sixth studio album by American rapper MC Lyte, released on August 18, 1998, by East West Records.

== Recording and release ==
The recording sessions took place at Electric Lady Studios, Quad Recording Studios, Record Plant, 2 Ton Sound, Chung King Studios, Unique Recording Studios and First Priority Labs in New York City, Capitol Studios and Westlake Recording Studios in Los Angeles, The Hit Factory and East Digital/Einstein Lab. The album was produced by Milk Dee, Missy Elliott, Giovanni Salah, the Neptunes, Peter Panic, Ron "Amen-Ra" Lawrence, Marc Kinchen, LL Cool J, Ralph Roundtree, Trackmasters, L.E.S., the Dynamic Duo, Royal Krush, and Sprague "Doogie" Williams. It features guest appearances from Beenie Man, Gina Thompson, Giovanni Salah, Inaya Day, La India, Milk Dee, Missy Elliott, Mocha, Nicci Gilbert, Pamela Long, Space Nine, and D Knowledge.

At the time of the album's recording, MC Lyte was also acting in the thriller film Train Ride. According to MC Lyte, the album's title references "a perfect number" twice. She also considered it "an introspective number, which means I looked inside for this album. I didn’t feel pressured by the hip-hop world to do a particular kind of album. I just let the music speak to me and talked about what came naturally."

In the United States, the album did not reach the Billboard 200, however it peaked at number 71 on the Top R&B/Hip-Hop Albums chart. It also made it to number 87 in Germany. Both of its singles, "I Can't Make a Mistake" and "It's All Yours", gained minor success in the UK Singles Chart, landing at No. 46 and 36, respectively.

== Critical reception ==
Professional ratings
Review scores
Source	Rating
AllMusic	3/5 stars
Robert Christgau	(3-star Honorable Mention)
The New Rolling Stone Album Guide	3/5 stars
The Source	3/5 stars

Rolling Stone described Seven & Seven as "the hardest, smartest, funniest female rap album of 1998; it’s full of memorable anecdotes, graceful beats and tasteful samples".

== Track listing ==
No.	Title	Writer(s)	Producer(s)	Length
1.	"In My Business"	Lana Moorer; Melissa Elliott	Missy "Misdemeanor" Elliott; Dynamic Duo (co.)	4:23
2.	"Too Fly" (featuring Pamela Long)	Moorer; Elliott; Donald Holmes; Gerard Thomas	Missy "Misdemeanor" Elliott; Dynamic Duo (co.)	4:18
3.	"This Emcee (Interlude)"	Moorer; Kirk Robinson	Milk Dee	2:09
4.	"Top Billin'" (featuring Milk Dee)	Robinson	Milk Dee	2:50
5.	"Give Me What I Want"	Marc Kinchen; Jamal Barrow	Marc Kinchen	4:21
6.	"Woo Woo (Freak Out)" (featuring Nicci Gilbert)	Moorer; Nicole Gilbert; Ron Lawrence; Giovanni Salah; Bernard Edwards; Nile Rodgers	Ron "Amen-Ra" Lawrence; Sprague "Doogie" Williams (add.)	4:34
7.	"Playgirls Play"	Moorer; James Todd Smith; Ralph Roundtree; William Lee Nichols	LL Cool J; Ralph "Big Round" Roundtree	3:53
8.	"Put It on You"	Moorer; Salah; Jean-Claude Olivier; Samuel Barnes; David Robert Jones; Carlos Alomar; John Lennon	Poke & Tone	4:04
9.	"Propa" (featuring Beenie Man)	Moorer; Moses Davis; Salah; Kenneth Gamble; Leon Huff; Tami Lester Smith	Giovanni Salah; Royal Krush (co.)	4:12
10.	"It's All Yours" (featuring Gina Thompson)	Moorer; Pharrell Williams; Chad Hugo	The Neptunes	4:41
11.	"I Can't Make a Mistake"	Moorer; Williams; Hugo	The Neptunes	3:51
12.	"Want What I Got" (featuring Missy "Misdemeanor" Elliott and Mocha)	Moorer; Elliott	Missy "Misdemeanor" Elliott; Dynamic Duo (co.)	3:47
13.	"Oogie Boogie"	Moorer; Lugenia Thompson; Japhe Tejeda; Janice Marie Johnson; Perry Kibble	Ron "Amen-Ra" Lawrence	4:18
14.	"Party Goin' On" (featuring Inaya Day)	Moorer; Peter Pottinger; James Bedford	Peter Panic	4:17
15.	"Break It Down" (featuring La India and Giovanni Salah)	Moorer; Salah	Giovanni Salah	3:50
16.	"Closer" (featuring Spice Nine)	Moorer; Tracey Selden; Williams; Hugo	The Neptunes	4:21
17.	"Radio's Nightmare (Interlude)"	Moorer	Giovanni Salah	0:53
18.	"My Time"	Moorer; Salah; Markita Ferguson; Blue Velvet; Red Sonia; Scarlet; Violet Ruby; Leshan Lewis; Olivier; Barnes; David Matthews	L.E.S.	3:23
19.	"Assaholic Anonymous (Interlude)" (featuring D Knowledge)	Tom Boruch; Brian Stephens	Milk Dee	1:16
20.	"King of Rock"	Moorer; Robinson	Milk Dee	2:22
21.	"Better Place"	Moorer; Pottinger; Dennis Lambert; Franne Golde; Walter Orange	Peter Panic	5:36
Total length:				1:17:19

Sample credits

- Track 4 is a cover of "Top Billin'" by Audio Two.
- Track 6 contains elements from "Le Freak" by Chic.
- Track 7 contains elements from "Do It ('Til You're Satisfied)" by B. T. Express.
- Track 8 contains elements from "Fame" by David Bowie.
- Track 9 contains elements from "Love Is the Message" by MFSB and "Seventh Heaven" by Gwen Guthrie.
- Track 13 contains elements from "Boogie Oogie Oogie" by A Taste of Honey.
- Track 14 contains elements from "Give Me Your Love" by Sylvia Striplin.
- Track 18 contains elements from "Crabapple" by Idris Muhammad.
- Track 21 contains elements from "Night Shift" by the Commodores.

== Charts ==
Chart (1998)	Peak position
German Albums (Offizielle Top 100)	87
US Top R&B/Hip-Hop Albums (Billboard)	71
