= The First Priority Music Family: Basement Flavor =

Compilation album by Various artists
- Released: December 15, 1988
- Recorded: 1987–1988
- Genre: Hip hop
- Length: 48:42
- Label: First Priority/Atlantic
- Producer: The King of Chill, Audio Two, Beat Factory, Alliance, Solid Productions

Professional ratings
Review scores
Source	Rating
AllMusic	4.5/5 stars

The First Priority Music Family: Basement Flavor is a hip hop compilation album, released on December 15, 1988, on First Priority/Atlantic Records. The single "I'm Not Havin' It" by Positive K and MC Lyte peaked at #16 on the Billboard Hot Rap Singles chart in 1989.

== Track listing ==
No.	Title	Music	Producer	Length
1.	"Get on Down"	Alliance	The King of Chill	3:48
2.	"Many Styles"	Audio Two	Audio Two	4:55
3.	"I'm Not Havin' It"	Positive K and MC Lyte	Audio Two	3:29
4.	"Victory Is Calling" (feat. MC Lyte)	Michie Mee and L.A. Luv	Beat Factory	5:29
5.	"Survival of the Fittest"	MC Lyte	The King of Chill	3:58
6.	"Tramp" (feat. Milk Dee)	Positive K	Audio Two	3:22
7.	"Peer Pressure"	Audio Two	Audio Two	4:06
8.	"On This Mic"	Michie Mee and L.A. Luv	Beat Factory	5:42
9.	"Kibbles and Bits"	Alliance	Alliance	4:24
10.	"Impulse on Three" (feat. Barsha)	Positive K	Audio Two	4:35
11.	"Break the Limits" (feat. See-Que)	Soulshock	Solid Productions	4:54
