= Ripple (band) =

American rock band

- Origin: Michigan, U.S.
- Genre: Funk
- Years active: 1973–1978
- Labels: GRC Records, Salsoul Records
- Members: Simon Carter; Walter Carter; David Ferguson; Bill Hull; Curtis Reynolds; Keith Samuels; Brian Sherrer

Ripple was an American funk band from Michigan. The group was signed to GRC Records and Salsoul Records in the 1970s and scored several hit singles, the biggest of which were "I Don't Know What It Is, but It Sure Is Funky" and "The Beat Goes On and On," the latter on Salsoul Records, joined by the Salsoul Orchestra. After moving to Atlanta, Georgia, Wally, Kenny, and Brian restructured the group, adding Victor Burks (keyboards) and Barry Lee (guitar). The group toured extensively around the Southeast, the highlight of which was opening for George Clinton and Parliament Funkadelic on their "Mothership Connection" tour. Wally, Kenny, Brian, Victor, and Barry went on to record their seminal album, Sons of the Gods. "The Beat Goes On and On", from that album, became a disco/hustle classic that still receives airplay today.

The signature "oh-la oh-la ay" line from "I Don't Know What It Is, but It Sure Is Funky" was later incorporated into Marcia Griffiths' smash hit, "Electric Boogie (Electric Slide)," along with Kid 'n Play's 1988 hit "Rollin' with Kid 'n Play."

== Band members ==
- Keith Samuels - guitar, lead vocals
- Simon Kenneth Carter - bass, vocals
- Brian Sherrer - drums, percussion, timbales
- Walter (Wally) Carter - conga, percussion, vocals
- Dave Ferguson - trumpet, flugel horn, percussion
- William (Bill) Hull - tenor sax, flute, percussion
- Curtis Reynolds - organ, piano, vibe master, vibraphone, vocals
- Victor Burks - keyboards, vocals
- Barry Lee - guitar

== Discography ==
=== Albums ===
- Ripple (GRC Records, 1973)
- Sons of the Gods (Salsoul Records, 1977)

=== Singles ===
Year	Title	Peak chart positions		
Year	Title	US Pop	US R&B	US Dance
1973	"I Don't Know What It Is, but It Sure Is Funky"	67	11	―
1973	"Willie Pass the Water"	―	27	―
1974	"You Were Right on Time"	―	51	―
1974	"A Funky Song"	―	41	―
1975	"This Ain't No Time to Be Giving Up"	―	81	―
1975	"Hey Lady"	―	―	―
1977	"Today"	―	―	―
1977	"The Beat Goes On and On"	―	91	13
"—" denotes releases that did not chart.
