= Top Billin' =

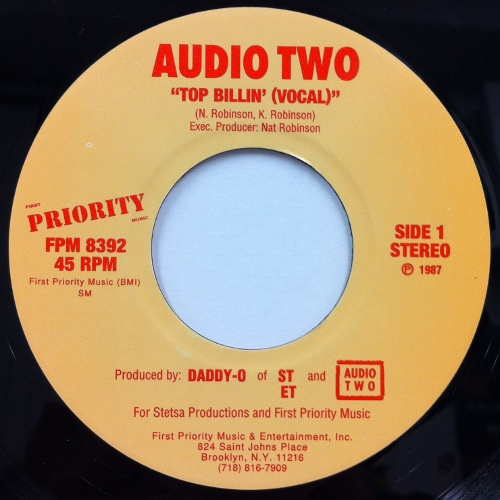
- One of side-A labels of U.S. vinyl single

Single by Audio Two

from the album What More Can I Say?
- A-side: "Make It Funky"
- Released: October 15, 1987
- Recorded: 1987
- Genre: Golden age hip hop
- Length: 2:56
- Label: First Priority Music
- Songwriter: Kirk Robinson
- Producers: Daddy-O; Audio Two

Audio Two singles chronology
""A Christmas Rhyme / Audio Two's Jam"" (1986)	"Top Billin'" (1987)	"Hickeys Around My Neck" (1988)

"Top Billin'" is a single for American hip-hop duo Audio Two, released as the B-side of the single "Make It Funky" from the album What More Can I Say? It was released before First Priority Music signed a distribution deal with Atlantic Records. The song was voted #8 in About.com's Top 100 Rap Songs. It was also included in the musical-reference book 1001 Songs You Must Hear Before You Die.

In 2012, the song was ranked 43rd as Rolling Stone's 50 Greatest Hip Hop Songs of All-Time.

The song is featured in 2004 video game Tony Hawk's Underground 2, and 2008 video game Grand Theft Auto IV on the fictional radio station The Classics 104.1. The song also features in NBA 2K22.

Elements of "Top Billin'" have been sampled or interpolated in more than 300 songs, including "I Get Money" by 50 Cent, "Otis" by Jay-Z and Kanye West, and "Real Love" by Mary J. Blige.

== Single track listing ==
=== "Make It Funky"/"Top Billin'" ===
A-side

1. "Make It Funky" – 4:56

B-Side

1. "Make It Funky (DUB)" – 4:05
2. "Top Billin'" - 2:50

=== "Top Billin' (Remix)" ===
A-side

1. "Top Billin (More Bass)" – 4:00
2. "Top Billin (Teddy Ted Mix) (No Half Steppin)" – 5:44
3. "Top Billin (808 Style)" – 3:09

B-side

1. "Top Billin (Original)" – 2:50
2. "Top Billin (Acapella)" – 2:48
3. "The Freshest Slowest Jam" – 5:09
