= MC Lyte =

American rapper (born 1970)

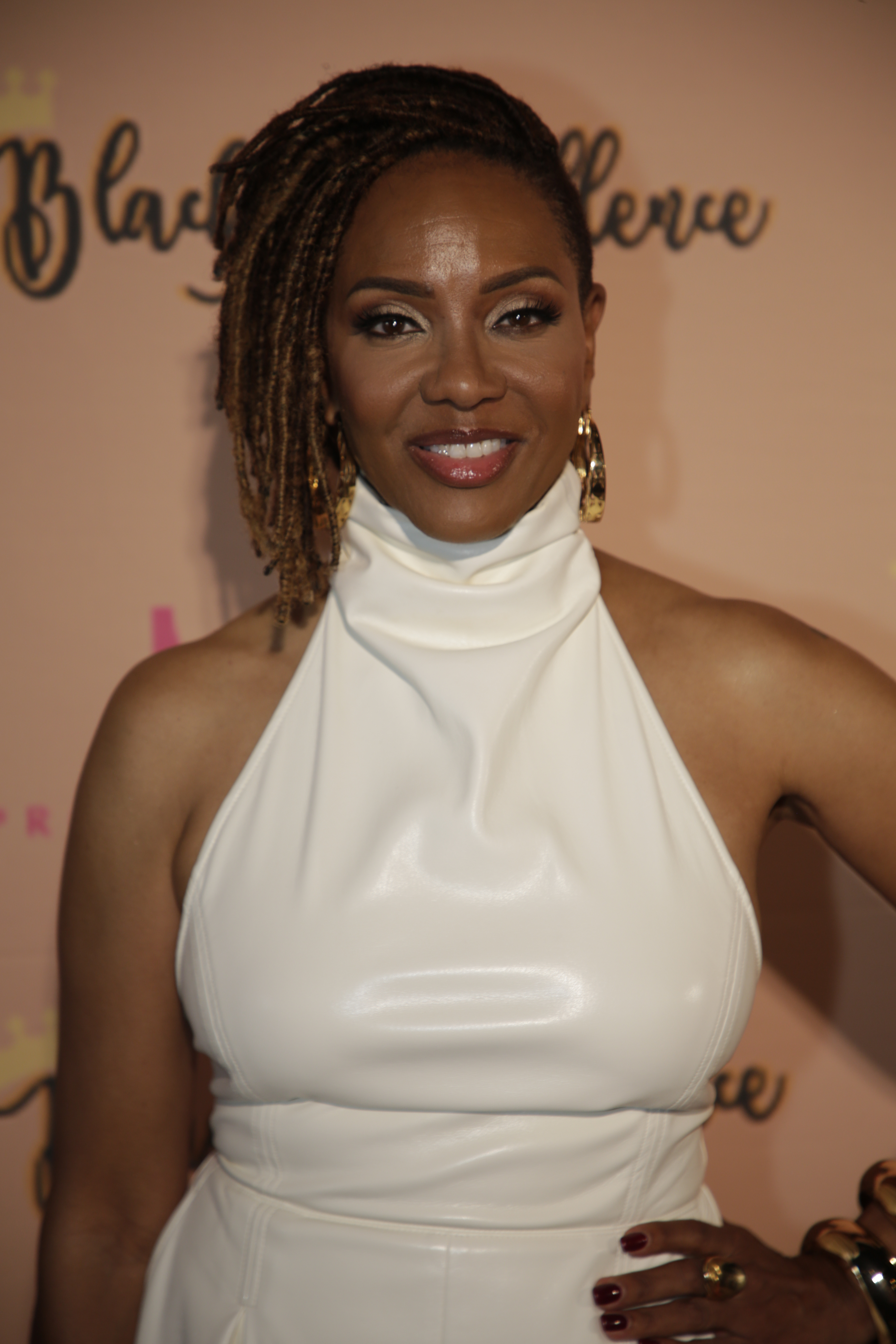
- Lyte at Black Excellence Brunch 2026.
- Born: Lana Michele Moorer; October 11, 1970 (age 56); New York City, U.S.
- Other name: Lytro
- Occupations: Rapper; songwriter; actress; television announcer; businesswoman
- Years active: 1984–present
- Organization: Hip Hop Sisters Foundation
- Works: Albums; singles; videography
- Title: Founder of Sunni Gyrl Inc.
- Spouse: John Wyche (m. 2017; div. 2023)
- Relatives: Charles Hamilton (cousin)
- Awards: Full list
- Musical career
- Origin: Brooklyn, New York City, U.S.
- Genre: Hip-hop
- Labels: First Priority; Atlantic; East West America; Elektra; iMUSIC; BMG; DuBose Music Group; Sunni Gyrl, Inc.; Omnivore
- Formerly of: First Priority Family; Stop the Violence Movement; H.E.A.L. Human Education Against Lies; Def Squad (honorary member); Almost September
- Website: mclyte.com

Lana Michele Moorer (born October 11, 1970), better recognized by her stage name MC Lyte, is an American rapper, songwriter, actress, television announcer, and businesswoman. Regarded as a pioneer in the field of female rap, MC Lyte initially gained fame in the late 1980s, becoming the first female rapper to release a full solo album with 1988's critically acclaimed Lyte as a Rock. The album spawned the singles "10% Dis" and "Paper Thin".

In 1989, she joined the supergroup Stop the Violence Movement, and appeared on the single "Self Destruction", which was the inaugural number-one single on the Billboard Hot Rap Singles chart. That same year, she released her second album Eyes on This, which became one of the first albums by a female solo rapper to chart on the Billboard 200. That album included the single "Cha Cha Cha". In 1991, MC Lyte released the hit single "Poor Georgie", which marked her first appearance on the Billboard Hot 100. Her 1993 single "Ruffneck", made her the first solo woman rapper to achieve a gold certification from the Recording Industry Association of America (RIAA). In 1994, she collaborated with Janet Jackson on the song "You Want This", and was featured alongside Queen Latifah and Yo-Yo on the remix track "I Wanna Be Down" by Brandy. Throughout her ongoing career, MC Lyte also had collaborations with mainstream artists such as Sinéad O'Connor, Will Smith, Mary J. Blige, Jay-Z, Moby, Aerosmith, Beyoncé and will.i.am. Her 1996 single "Keep On, Keepin' On" featuring Xscape, reached the top ten on Billboard Hot 100. She then collaborated with Missy Elliott on the hit song "Cold Rock a Party", which was her fifth number-one song on the Hot Rap Singles chart. In 2004, she was nominated for a Grammy Award for Best Female Rap Solo Performance for the track "Ride Wit Me".

In addition to her current career as a rapper, she has worked in parallel as voiceover talent for various events, writer, DJ and has starred in various roles in film and television. In 2022, she had her directional debut with the short film Break Up In Love. Lyte has worked with several charities, including her own foundation, Hip Hop Sisters.

Lyte has been cited as an influence to many women in hip-hop. In 2023, Billboard and Vibe ranked her as one of the 50 greatest rappers. She has received the "I Am Hip Hop" Icon Lifetime Achievement from the BET Hip Hop Awards, and was honored at the VH1 Hip Hop Honors. In October 2014, Lyte became the first female artist to perform Hip Hop at the White House. In September 2016, she was awarded with the W. E. B. Du Bois Medal, Harvard University's highest honor in the field of African and African-American studies. In 2026, MC Lyte was inducted into the Rock and Roll Hall of Fame through the influence category.

== Early life ==
Lana Michele Moorer was born in the Queens borough of New York City and was raised in the East Flatbush section of Brooklyn, New York City. She began rapping at 12-years-old. MC Lyte's original stage name was Sparkle. She recorded her first track at age 14, which was released 2 years later.

She regards Milk Dee and DJ Giz, the hip-hop duo Audio Two, as "totally like [her] brothers", because the three grew up together. Audio Two's father, Nat Robinson, started a label for them, called First Priority. After making the label, Robinson made a deal with Atlantic under the condition that Lyte would get a record contract with Atlantic as well.

== Musical career ==
=== Beginnings: Lyte as a Rock and Eyes on This (1987–1990) ===
In 1987, at the age of 16, Lyte released her debut single, "I Cram to Understand U (Sam)", being one of the first songs written about the crack era. She was 12 years old at the time she wrote the song.

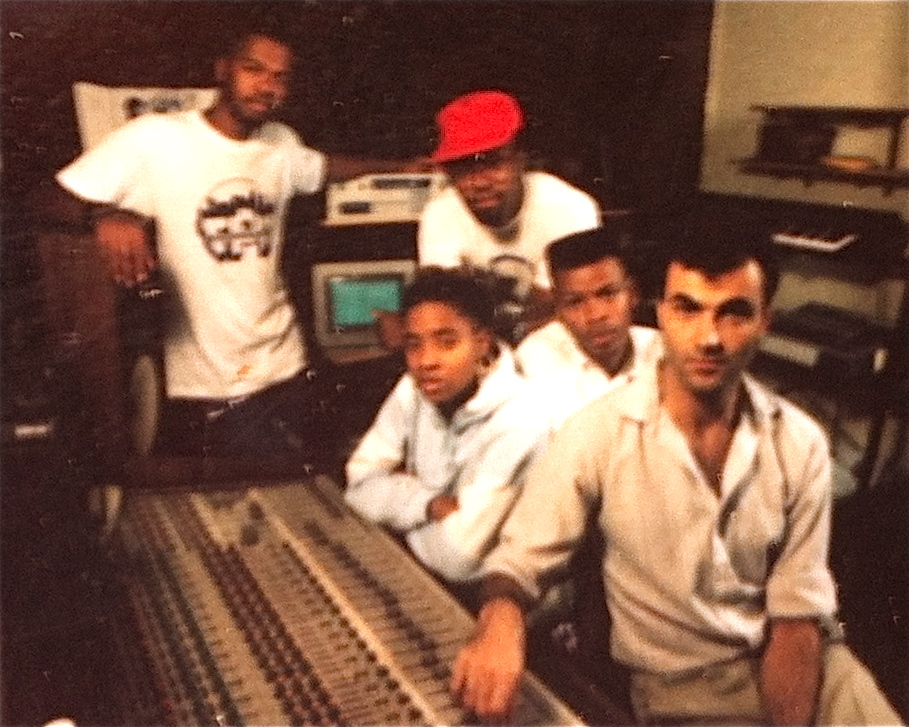
MC Lyte in 1988 at Firehouse Studios in Brooklyn with her producers Gizmo, Milk D and King of Chill and engineer Yoram Vazan

In April 1988 she released her debut album Lyte as a Rock. In addition to "I Cram to Understand U (Sam)" were released as singles "Paper Thin", the eponymous "Lyte as a Rock", and "10% Dis", a diss track to then-Hurby Azor associate Antoinette. The album peaked at No. 50 on the then Billboard Top Black Albums. Despite not having a great commercial performance, it is considered one of the best and most important rap albums, both in the 80s and in history. In 1988, The Village Voice magazine rated Lyte as "the best female vocalist in hip-hop". Lyte was featured in the remix and music video of "I Want Your (Hands on Me)" by Irish singer Sinéad O'Connor, which debuted in May 1988 on MTV.

In January 1989, Lyte joined the Stop the Violence Movement with Boogie Down Productions, Public Enemy and Heavy D, among others. Together they released the single "Self Destruction" in response to violence in the hip-hop and African American communities. The song debuted at No. 1 on the first week of Billboard Hot Rap Singles existence and the proceeds were donated to the National Urban League. In late August 1989, her song "I'm Not Havin' It" with Positive K entered the Billboard Hot Rap Singles, peaking at No. 16, becoming MC Lyte's first appearance on a chart as solo artist. In October 1989, Lyte published her second album Eyes on This. This album, like its predecessor, received a great critical reception and is recognized as a hip-hop classic.

With Eyes on This she became the first solo female rapper to have an entry on the Billboard 200. From this album came the singles "Cha Cha Cha", the first time as a solo artist she charted on the Billboard Hot Black Singles and reached No. 1 on the Hot Rap Singles. "Stop, Look, Listen", and the socially conscious "Cappucino". In 1989 she also collaborated with Foster & McElroy, known for their work with En Vogue and Tony! Toni! Toné!, in the song "Dr. Soul". This single peaked at No. 10 on Billboard Black Songs.

In 1990, MC Lyte performed at Carnegie Hall.

MC Lyte's DJ since the start of her career, DJ K-Rock, is a cousin, Kennith Moorer. Aside from a break in 1992, the two have toured consistently to the present. During that time she also had her own dancers, Leg One and Leg Two, who performed with her in shows and in music videos.

=== 1991–1995: Act Like You Know and Ain't No Other ===
In May 1991, Lyte performed on "Yo! Unplugged Rap", the first MTV Unplugged episode to feature rap artists, alongside A Tribe Called Quest, De La Soul and LL Cool J. Her performance was praised by Entertainment Weekly's Ken Tucker, who commented, "MC Lyte performed her song 'Cappucino' like a rapping Aretha Franklin: Lyte brought out the soul in her lyrics." In September 1991, Lyte released her third album, Act Like You Know, which incorporated a softer R&B/New Jack Swing sound across some of the tracks.

This release received more mixed reviews than her previous albums and commercially it performed more weakly than its predecessor, Eyes on This. From this album came the singles "When in Love" and the socially conscious "Poor Georgie" (Lyte's first entry on the Billboard Hot 100 and her third No. 1 on the Hot Rap Singles) and "Eyes Are the Soul". In 1991 she also participated in the socially conscious single "Heal Yourself" by the collective "HEAL Human Education Against Lies", which included Big Daddy Kane, Boogie Down Productions, Run-DMC, Queen Latifah and LL Cool J.

Between 1991 and 1992, Lyte participated in "The Greatest Rap Show Ever" concert held at Madison Square Garden with Public Enemy, Naughty by Nature, Queen Latifah, Geto Boys and DJ Jazzy Jeff & The Fresh Prince, among others. In the fall of 1991, she performed in the hip-hop special Sisters In The Name of Rap alongside Salt-N-Pepa, Yo-Yo, Queen Latifah and Roxanne Shanté, among many others. It was recorded at the Ritz in NYC as a pay-per-view TV concert and released on VHS in 1992.

In October 1992, as part of the Mo Money soundtrack, MC Lyte collaborated with Jimmy Jam and Terry Lewis, known primarily for their work with Janet Jackson, on the single "Ice Cream Dream". In 1992 she performed on Kris Kross's Back to School Jam tour, which featured A Tribe Called Quest and Fu-Schnickens.

In 1992, Lyte began work on her next album, titled Ain't No Other, which was released on June 22, 1993. With a more hardcore hip-hop sound, Lyte achieved better critical reception than her prior album. "Ruffneck" was released as a single, which became her first top 40 single on the Billboard Hot 100, peaking at No. 35, and fourth No. 1 on the Hot Rap Singles, also earning her first gold certification. With "Ruffneck", MC Lyte had a nomination for the 36th edition of the Grammy Awards in the Best Rap Solo Performance category. In October 1993, Lyte performed at the 1993 Budweiser Superfest with SWV, Bell Biv Devoe, LeVert, Big Daddy Kane and Silk.

In May 1994, MC Lyte performed in the finale of The Arsenio Hall Show, alongside KRS-One, Wu-Tang Clan, Naughty by Nature, Guru of Gang Starr, Yo-Yo, Das EFX and A Tribe Called Quest, among others. In June, she collaborated with Ice Cube, Public Enemy's Chuck D and Ice-T on Public Enemy's Terminator X album Super Bad. In the middle of 1994 she collaborated with Janet Jackson on the single remix and music video for "You Want This", peaking at No. 8 on the Billboard Hot 100 and earning a nomination for Music Video of the Year at the 2th edition of the Soul Train Lady of Soul Awards. In the summer of '94 she participated in Janet Jackson's Janet World Tour.

In early 1995, she collaborated with Queen Latifah and Yo-Yo on the remix of Brandy's top 10 single "I Wanna Be Down", earning a nomination at the 12th edition of the MTV Video Music Award in the Best Rap Video category. In April 1995 she collaborated alongside Meshell Ndegeocello, Patra, Yo-Yo, Latifah, Salt-N-Pepa and TLC's Left Eye Lopes in the rap remix of "Freedom" on the Panther movie soundtrack In June, she performed at the Jam for Peace with Warren G, Mary J. Blige, Brownstone, Adina Howard, Montell Jordan and Soul for Real. In 1995 she also collaborated with Lin Que on the remix of Mary J. Blige's "You Bring Me Joy".

=== 1996–1998: Bad as I Wanna B and Seven & Seven ===
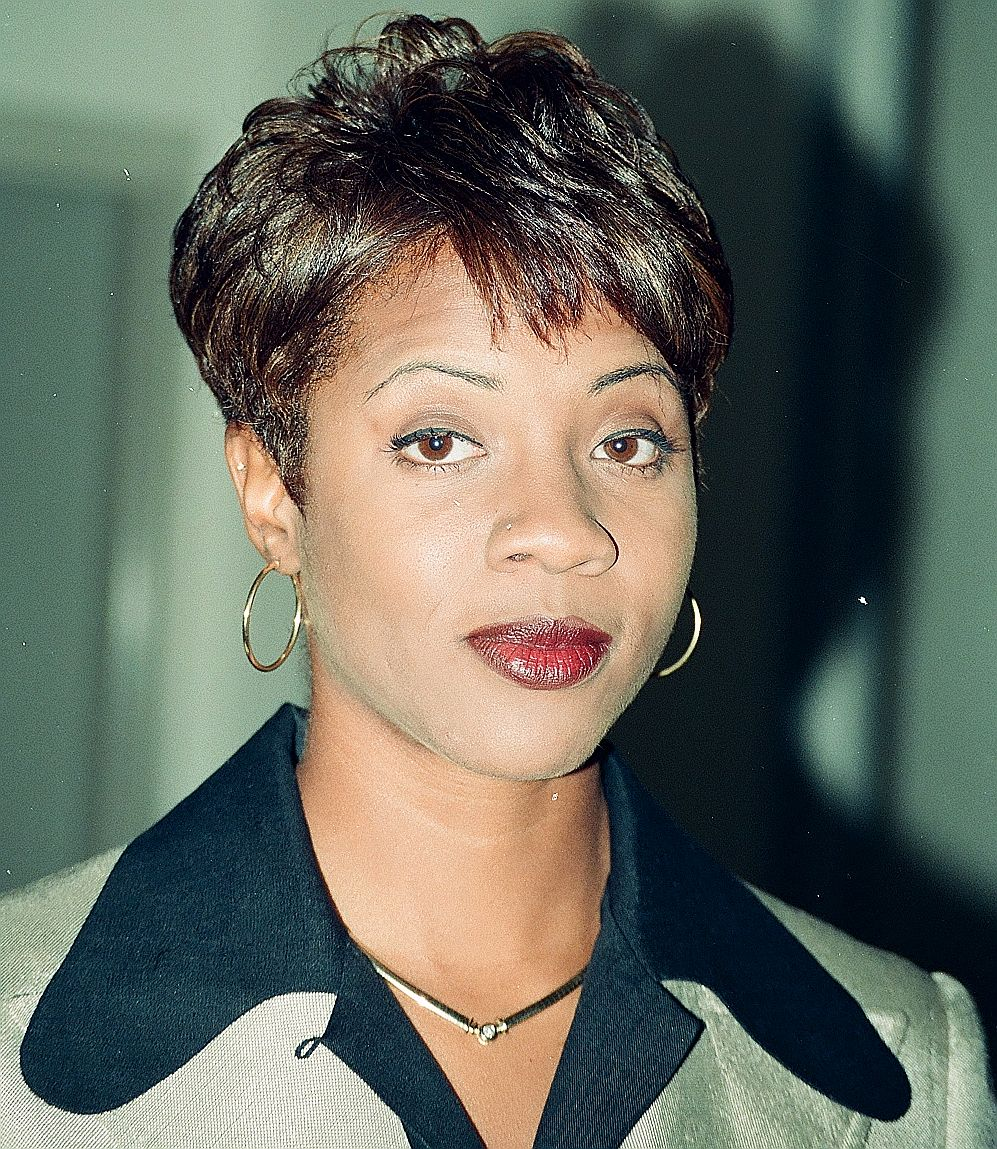
MC Lyte, 1996

In February 1996, MC Lyte collaborated on the R&B group Xscape's single "Can't Hang". In February she also collaborated with Lord Finesse on the interlude "Taking It Lyte" from his album The Awakening. In March, after signing with East West Records, she released "Keep On Keepin' On", the first single from her forthcoming album. This new collaboration with Xscape reached No. 10 on the Billboard Hot 100, her highest position on this chart as main artist, getting a gold certification. "Keep On Keepin' On" was part of the soundtrack of the film Sunset Park. In September, she won the Best R&B, Soul or Rap Video category in the 3rd edition of Soul Train Lady of Soul Awards with this song.

In August 1996, Lyte released her fifth album, Bad as I Wanna B. With tracks with a Pop/R&B-oriented sound the album received mixed reviews. In November, she released a Sean "Puffy" Combs remix of "Cold Rock a Party" featuring Missy Elliott. This single peaked at No. 11 on the Billboard Hot 100 and became her fifth No. 1 single on the Hot Rap Singles (fourth as lead artist), earning a gold certification. It entered the top 40 of various charts outside the United States, being No. 1 and certified platinum in New Zealand.

In February 1997, "Keep on Pushin" was included in the soundtrack of Dangerous Ground, in which MC Lyte, Bahamadia, Nonchalant and Yo-Yo collaborated under the production of Pete Rock. In March 1997, she collaborated with R&B singer Billy Lawrence on the single "Come On", which was included in the soundtrack of the movie Set it Off. In June and July 1997, she embarked on a USO Tour, performing for American troops in Italy and Greece.

In November she collaborated with LL Cool J and Busta Rhymes on the debut album of the R&B supergroup LSG on the track "Curious", which was later released as single. In 1997, Lyte also collaborated with Parliament-Funkadelic's Bootsy Collins on the single "I'm Leavin U (Gotta Go, Gotta Go)" from his album Fresh Outta 'P' University.

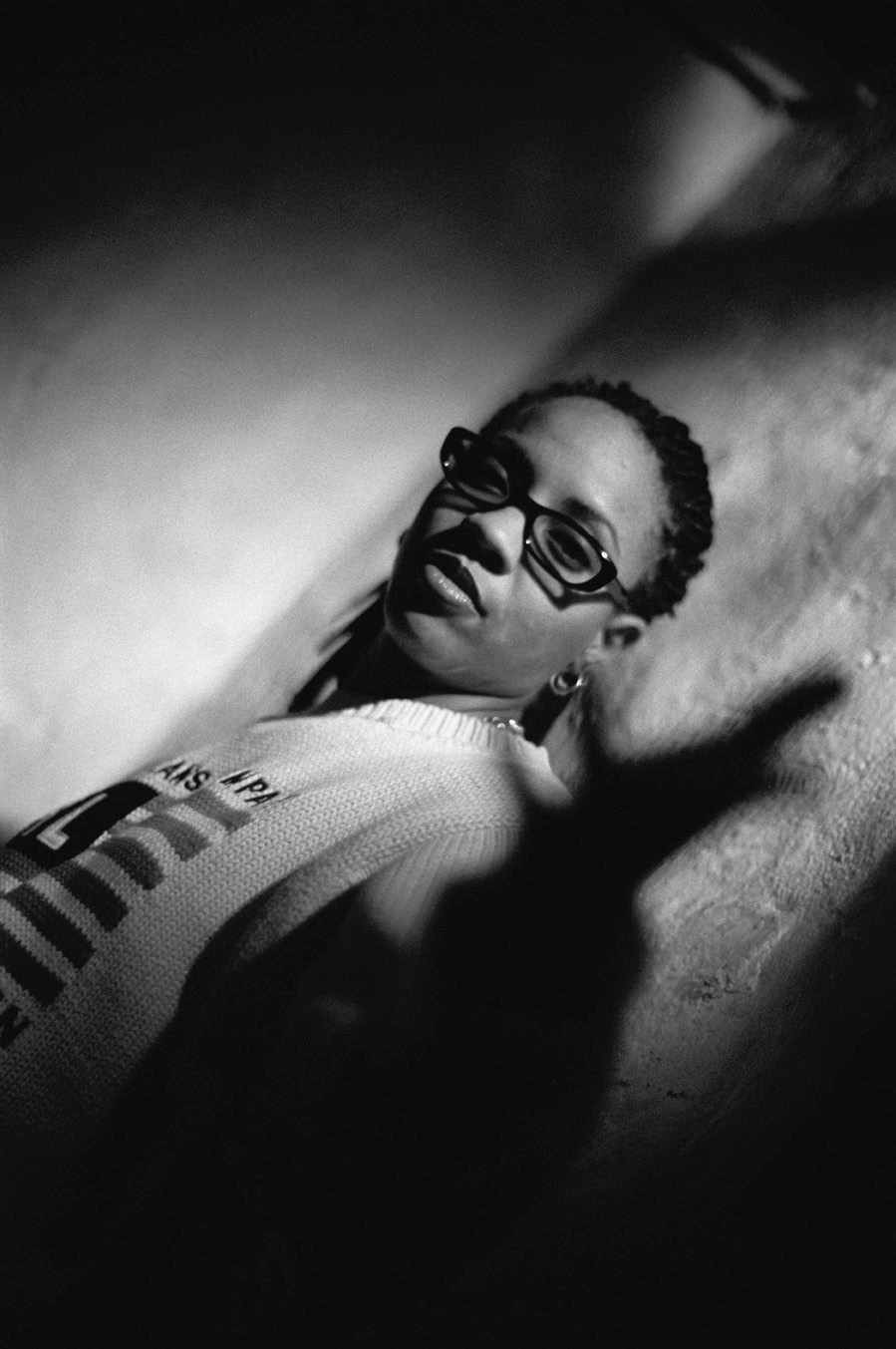
MC Lyte in Hamburg, Germany, 1998

In August 1998 MC Lyte released her sixth studio album Seven & Seven. It had a poor commercial and critical reception despite having the collaboration of famous producers and artists such as The Neptunes, LL Cool J, Missy Elliott, L.E.S. and Trackmasters, which led to Lyte's departure from EastWest Records. In 1998 she went on another USO Tour, performing in Germany.

=== 1999–2012: Collaborations and releases independently ===
In November 1999, MC Lyte collaborated on the remix of Jammin of Bob Marley in the remix album Chant Down Babylon. This track was later released as a single. In November she also collaborated with Will Smith and Tatyana Ali on "Who Am I" from Smith's album Willennium.

In March 2000, MC Lyte collaborated with Common and Bilal on the track "A Film Called (Pimp)" on Common's album Like Water for Chocolate.

In September 2001, her first compilation album The Very Best of MC Lyte was released.

In April 2002, the soundtrack for the TV series Dark Angel was released, which includes Lyte's songs "Dark Angel Theme", in collaboration with Public Enemy, and "No Dealz", with Ericka Yancey. In May 2002, MC Lyte collaborated with Angie Stone on the album version of "Jam for the Ladies" by electronica musician Moby. In November, she collaborated with Erick Sermon and Rah Digga on the track "Tell Me" on Sermon's album React. During that time Lyte became an honorary member of Sermon and Redman's supergroup Def Squad.

In March 2003, Lyte released the independently produced record Da Undaground Heat, Vol. 1, featuring Jamie Foxx. The album had little commercial impact and mixed reviews, but the single "Ride Wit Me" received a nomination for the 46th edition of the Grammy Awards in the Best Female Rap Vocal Performance category. In June 2003, she teamed with the rock group Aerosmith, Public Enemy's Chuck D and Flavor Flav, Busta Rhymes and Phife Dawg in the group the Spitballers. Together they released "Let's Get Loud (Everybody Get Up)", which became the opening song of the 11th edition of the ESPY Awards.

In August, Lyte collaborated with Beyoncé, Missy Elliott and Free on the single "Fighting Temptation" as part of the soundtrack for the homonymous film. In August, she released the compilation album The Shit I Never Dropped, which includes previously unreleased collaborations with En Vogue's Dawn Robinson, Da Brat, Missy Elliott, Erick Sermon and Clipse. In September, she collaborated with Black Eyed Peas's will.i.am and Fergie on the track "Mash Out" on will.i.am's album Must B 21.

In May 2004, MC Lyte collaborated with Teena Marie and Medusa on the song "The Mackin' Game" from Teena Marie's album La Doña. In August, she collaborated with Boyz II Men on their cover of "What You Won't Do for Love". In 2004, Lyte was nominated at the 4th edition of the BET Awards in the Best Female Hip Hop Artist category.

In 2005, she released two songs produced by Richard "Wolfie" Wolf, called "Can I Get It Now" and "Don't Walk Away". MC Lyte's song "My Main Aim" was the title song of the basketball video game NBA Live 2005 by EA Sports. In 2005 she collaborated with the Polish-born German producer DJ Tomekk on the track "Partyverlauf" from his album Numma Eyns.

In July 2006, MC Lyte released "The Wonder Years" in collaboration with DJ Premier. In October 2006, Lyte was one of the artists honored at the 3rd edition of the VH1 Hip Hop Honors, where she performed with Da Brat, Lil' Kim, Yo-Yo and Remy Ma. Lyte was the first female solo rapper to achieve this recognition. In 2006, she performed on the "Ebony Black Family Reunion Tour" along with Doug E. Fresh, Slick Rick, and Whodini.

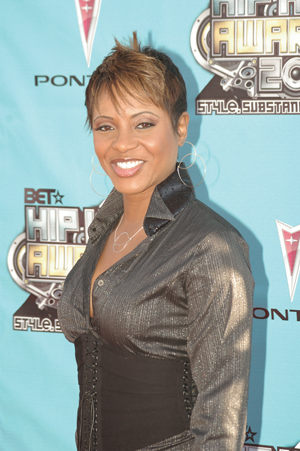
Lyte at the October 14, 2007 BET Hip Hop Awards

In 2007, MC Lyte joined The Roots and Big Daddy Kane on the "VH1 Hip Hop Honors Tour". In July, she performed at the opening of the 25th annual Martin Luther King Jr. Concert Series in Brooklyn. In July she also performed for the first time at the Essence Music Festival in New Orleans.

In 2007, Lyte released the singles "Mad At Me" and "Money" with KRS-One, the latter part of KRS-One's album Adventures in Emceein.

In May 2008, as a member of the group Almost September with Philip "Whitey" White and Jared Lee Gosselin, MC Lyte released The Almost September EP. This features an R&B/Soul oriented sound. Later she embarked with the group on a tour in Europe. In June, she released the song "Closer", a collaboration with her cousin Charles Hamilton. In October 2008, she performed "Cha Cha Cha" at the 3rd edition of the BET Hip Hop Awards. In December, MC Lyte collaborated with Jay-Z on "BK Anthem".

In February 2009, Lyte collaborated with India Arie on the track "Psalms 23" from her album Testimony: Vol. 2, Love & Politics. In June 2009, Lyte collaborated again with Teena Marie on the track "The Pressure" from her album Congo Square. In 2009, she also released the single with a Reggae-oriented sound "Brooklyn".

In December 2010, she performed on the concert/TV Special VH1 Divas Salute The Troops, which also featured Nicki Minaj, Katy Perry, Keri Hilson, and Heart.

In 2011, MC Lyte performed again at the Essence Music Festival and released the single "Dada da Da".

In March 2012, she collaborated with Grammy-winning singer Macy Gray on the interlude "Really (Skit)" from her album Covered. In 2012, she released the single "Dopestyle" and her own Mobile app MC Lyte App, where she published her exclusive musical releases.

=== 2013–present: Legend and following projects ===
In January 2013, MC Lyte received a Lifetime Achievement Award at Russell Simmons's Hip Hop Inaugural Ball. In June, she released "Cravin'", in collaboration with Stan Carrizosa as the first single from her forthcoming album. In October, Lyte was honored with the Icon Lifetime Achievement "I Am Hip Hop" at the 8th edition of the BET Hip Hop Awards for her contributions to hip-hop culture.

In September 2014, "Dear John", featuring Common and 10Beats, was released as the second single. In September, she reunited with Queen Latifah, Brandy and Yo-Yo to perform "I Wanna Be Down" at the 2014 BET Hip Hop Awards in celebration of its 20th anniversary. On October 14, 2014, MC Lyte performed "Cha Cha Cha" and "Dear John" to President Barack Obama at the celebration for the 50th anniversary of the legislation that created the National Endowment for the Humanities and the National Endowment for the Arts, becoming the first female artist to perform Hip Hop at the White House. In November, she released "Ball" as the third single.

In April 2015, MC Lyte released Legend, her eighth solo album and her first full-length studio album in 12 years. As part of Record Store Day, the album was available for 24 hours only on a limited-edition vinyl collector's item. Shortly before the album's release, the fourth and final single "Check" was released.

In July 2016, Lyte performed at the Essence Music Festival in New Orleans. In September, she was awarded the W. E. B. Du Bois Medal, the Harvard University's highest honor in the field of African and African-American studies. In October, she collaborated with Eric Benét on the track "Holdin' On" from his eponymous album.

In June 2017, during Hot 97's annual Summer Jam music festival, Remy Ma brought out MC Lyte, along with The Lady of Rage, Cardi B, Young M.A, Monie Love, Lil' Kim, and Queen Latifah, to celebrate female rappers and perform Latifah's 1993 hit single "U.N.I.T.Y." about female empowerment. She also released the single "Money on My Mind".

In 2018, she continued to release a strand of singles, one of which was 'Easy', in response to her British audience claiming that artists who recorded new jack swing were sexually explicit. In July 2018, she was a special guest on Queen Latifah's show "Ladies First" in the Essence Music Festival, along with Brandy, Missy Elliott, Salt-N-Pepa, Roxanne Shante, Yo-Yo, Monie Love and Remy Ma.

In January 2019, she received The Trail Blazer Award at the Trumpet Awards in Atlanta with Yo Yo, Lil Mama, Da Brat, Big Tigger, and DJ K-Rock helping to celebrate with a performance of Lyte songs.

In 2024, Lyte scored and acted as music supervisor for the film adaptation of The Memo: What Women of Color Need to Know to Secure a Seat at the Table by Minda Harts. The psychological thriller film, titled The Memo, starred Kyla Pratt.

== Other ventures ==
=== Acting ===
Lyte's first acting role was in 1991 in an off-Broadway theater play titled Club Twelve, a hip-hop twist on Twelfth Night alongside Wyclef Jean, Lauryn Hill and Lisa Nicole Carson. After she made her film debut in the 1993 movie titled Fly by Night, starring alongside Jeffrey Sams, Ron Brice and Steve Gomer, she also starred in other films, such as A Luv Tale (1999), Train Ride (2000), Civil Brand (2002) and Playa's Ball (2003). In 2011, she guest starred in the Regular Show episode "Rap It Up", portraying a member of a hip-hop group also including characters voiced by Tyler, the Creator and Childish Gambino. Lyte signed with the production unit Duc Tha Moon for three years and eventually made a deal with Sirius Satellite Radio. Lyte also made appearances on the following television shows: Lyric Cafe, Hip Hop Honors and Black in the 80s.

In June 2006, MC Lyte was interviewed for the documentary The Rap Report, Part 2. MC Lyte talked about her career in rap music and what it was like during the beginnings of hip-hop. She also performed a concert of her most famous hits. The program was produced by Rex Barnett. In 2007, Lyte joined the cast of MTV's Celebrity Rap Superstar and coached Shar Jackson to a hip-hop emcee victory in a mere eight weeks.

In 2017, Lyte played Detective Makena Daniels in the drama series Tales. She then played DEA Special Agent Katrina 'K.C.' Walsh in the police drama S.W.A.T. and Tiffany in the TV ONE production Loved to Death. Lyte has been featured on television as herself on such shows as In Living Color, Moesha, Cousin Skeeter, New York Undercover, My Wife and Kids and Sisters in the Name of Rap. She also acted on such TV shows as In the House, Get Real, Half & Half, Queen of the South and The District.

In 2020, Lyte starred in Bad Hair directed by Justin Simien and Sylvie's Love, a period piece set in the 1960s opposite Tessa Thompson. In 2021 and 2022, Lyte starred as Tina Nixon in VH1's Hip Hop Family Christmas and its sequel Hip Hop Family Christmas Wedding alongside Keri Hilson, Ne-Yo, Terrence J, Redman and Serayah.

=== Business and commerce ===
MC Lyte opened Shaitel, a Los Angeles boutique that specialized in accessories from belts to sunglasses. "We sell a mixture of new and vintage [items]," she explained. "We also have a few signature pieces that are done just for the store. We boast to bring a little New York flavor out here to California."

In 1997, MC Lyte launched Sunni Gyrl Inc., a global entertainment firm that specializes in artist management and development, production, and creative services and consulting.

=== Voiceover ===
In 1996, MC Lyte began doing voiceovers, working on a short-lived BET show called The Boot and doing some branding for the Starz network, Tide, AT&T, the National Urban League, and many others. She did the voice of Tia for the Mattel toy line Diva Starz from 2000 to 2002.

=== DJing ===
DJ MC Lyte served as the DJ of choice at Michael Jordan's 50th Birthday Celebration, at his 2013 wedding reception, and at Jay Leno's farewell party. Lyte has gone on to provide music for The Image Awards, Nissan, Google, Black Enterprise, and many others.

=== Speaker ===
MC Lyte has spoken at colleges and universities, for organizations around the globe, and with notable people like Iyanla Vanzant, Russell Simmons, and Soledad O'Brien bringing a message of empowerment from her book Unstoppable: Igniting the Power Within to Achieve Your Greatest Potential. She also partnered with the Thurgood Marshall College Fund on the iLEAD international tour in South Africa to empower the continent's youth and up-and-coming leaders.

=== Leadership and philanthropy ===
In 1991, MC Lyte was featured in a TV informercial promoting pro-choice abortion rights political action "The Most Exciting Women in Music" alongside Corina, Juliet Cuming, Kim Gordon (Sonic Youth), Lady Miss Kier (Deee-Lite), Kate Pierson (The B-52's), Crystal Waters, Tina Weymouth (Talking Heads, Tom Tom Club).

In February 2006, her diary, as well as a turntable, records, and other assorted ephemera from the early days of hip-hop, were donated to the Smithsonian Institution. This collection, entitled "Hip-Hop Won't Stop: The Beat, the Rhymes, the Life" is a program to assemble objects of historical relevance to the hip-hop genre from its inception. MC Lyte served as the President of the Los Angeles Chapter of the Recording Academy (the Grammy organization) from 2011 to 2013. She was the first African American woman to serve in this role.

She is the founder of Hip Hop Sisters Foundation, which presented two $100,000 scholarships to college students each of the first two years of its inception and three $50,000 scholarships as a part of its #EducateOurMen initiative during its third year during the Soul Train Music Awards Red Carpet Preshow.

== Artistry ==
=== Influences, style and rapping technique ===
MC Lyte has considered artists such as Salt-N-Pepa, Rakim, Roxanne Shanté, Doug E. Fresh, Kool Moe Dee, Sha-Rock from Funky 4 + 1, and Run-DMC as her inspirations early in her musical career. In an interview with XXL in 2013, Lyte talks about the influence in her early days of Melle Mel and Grandmaster Flash and the Furious Five (specifically the song "The Message"). She also claimed to know "all the words" on Kurtis Blow's records. Throughout her career, she has also paid tribute to other artists such as Spoonie Gee (who she covered on Act Like You Know), Slick Rick, The Rock Steady Crew, LL Cool J and Queen Latifah. In an interview with The Source in 2015, when asked about her motivation to record her latest album, Legend, Lyte said she was inspired by Kendrick Lamar, Kanye West and Drake, among other rappers.

Her style of rap has been described in the book Listen to Rap! Exploring a Musical Genre as "mid-tempo but aggressive (lots of plosives) and carefully articulated, with emphasis on end rhymes." Her alto voice tone is one of the generally most highlighted features in her music, being described as "husky", "raspy", "raw", "throat-grabbing" and "authoritative". Her voice is also considered by Public Enemy's Chuck D as "one of the greatest voices of all time". According to the Hip hop Archive and Research Institute, "MC Lyte combined a deep, rich, strong voice with emotional vulnerability, insightful artistic and social analysis, and a playful sense of humor."

Much of the lyrical content of MC Lyte's repertoire is based on braggadocio rap, although she recorded a considerable number of songs that address social issues, such as addictions ("I Cram to Understand U (Sam)", "Poor Georgie", "Eyes Are the Soul", "Lola from the Copa"), misogyny/gender issues ("Paper Thin", I'm Not Havin' It, "Please Understand", "Eyes Are the Soul", "Mickey Slipper", "I Go On", "Freedom"), HIV/AIDS ("Eyes Are the Soul", "Lola from the Copa") and crime ("Self Destruction", Cappucino", "Not wit' a Dealer", "Eyes Are the Soul", "Druglord Superstar", "King of Rock"). Other themes present in her songs are spirituality ("Search 4 the Lyte", "God Said Lyte", "Better Place") and sexuality ("Like a Virgin", "Ice Cream Dream", "Ruffneck", "Keep On Keepin' On").

== Legacy ==
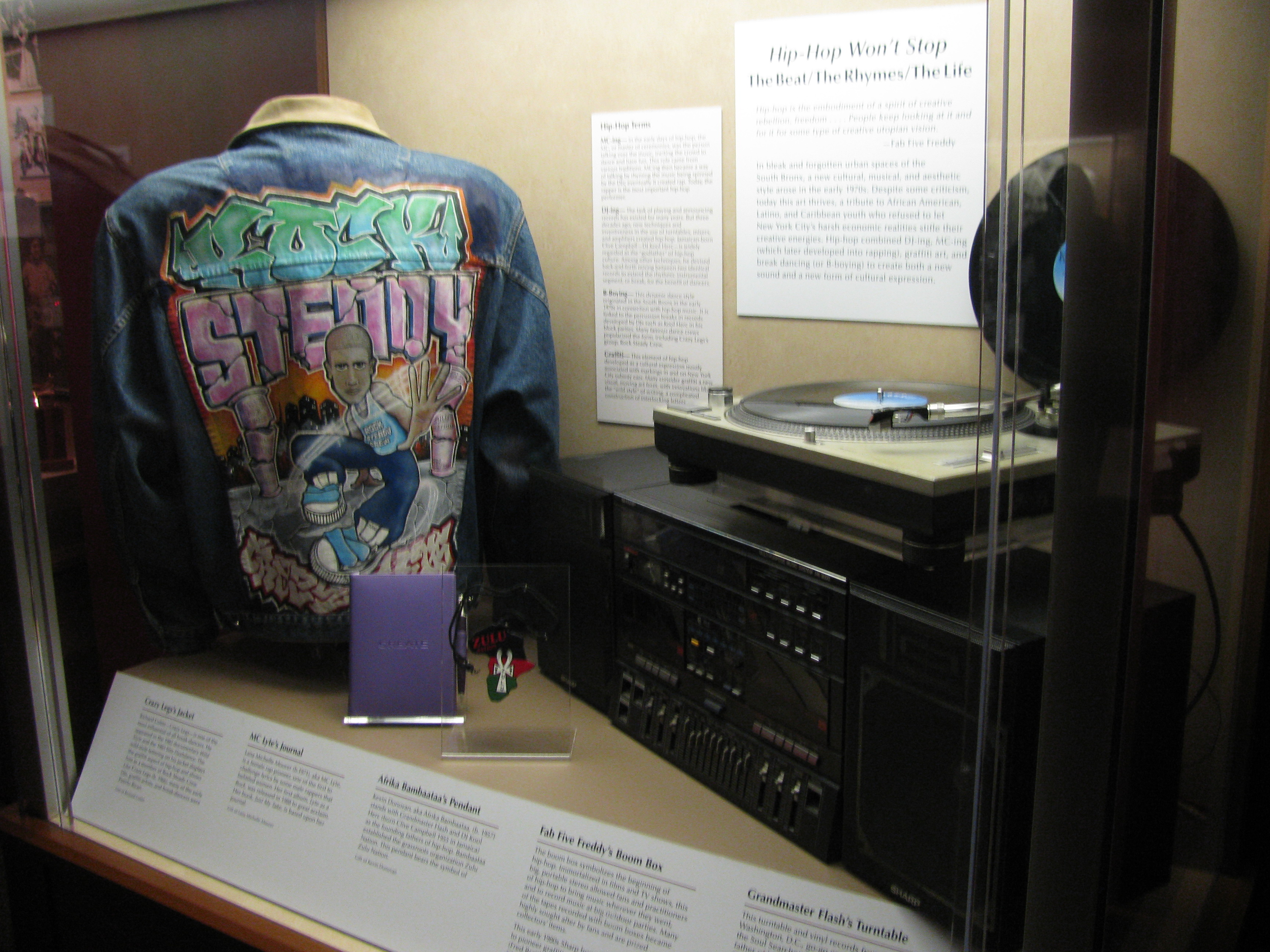
MC Lyte's diary displayed in National Museum of American History

MC Lyte was considered by both the specialized press and fans as one of the best and most important hip-hop artists, mainly among female artists.

Greg Prato of AllMusic, referred to her as one of the first female rappers to "point out the sexism and misogyny that often runs rampant in hip-hop", often taking the subject "head on lyrically" in her songs. The Birmingham Times has credited her for helping transition hip-hop from the "feel-good, party vibe" of the late 1970s into a "socially conscious form of expression", as the rapper addressed issues like racism, sexism, and the drug culture had been affecting the African-American community. Billboard, The Washington Post, and NPR have cited her as a "hip-hop pioneer".

MC Lyte has influenced the work of later female rappers such as Queen Latifah, Lil' Kim, Da Brat, Missy Elliott, Lauryn Hill, Monie Love, Eve, Rapsody, and Flo Milli, as well as rock artist Jack White. Also About.com ranked her No. 26 on their list of the 50 Greatest MCs of Our Time (1987–2007) and No. 6 in the Greatest Rappers Ever survey organized by NME. Furthermore, Vibe magazine has referred to MC Lyte as the "Queen of Rap".

== Personal life ==
In 2016, producer and rapper Q-Tip revealed on his Apple Music 1 show Abstract Radio that he used to date Lyte in his days before landing a record deal with A Tribe Called Quest. In the early 1990s, Lyte was in a relationship with Todd "Todd 1" Brown (1970–2019), then the producer of Yo! MTV Raps and at that time she would also make public in an interview that they were engaged. Brown later said that the latter was part of a joke started by one of the hosts of the show Tyrone "T Money" Kelsie "he came up with the marriage idea and then mayhem ensued.

After the initial show, the story got so big that an interviewer actually asked Lyte about her "marriage"... and instead of her shooting down the rumor, she went along with it." Later it was speculated in the media that for a few years she had a relationship with actress Tichina Arnold. Later these rumors were denied by Arnold. In May 2015, some media speculated that Lyte had dated R&B singer Janelle Monae, but these rumors have not been confirmed by either of them.

In early 2016, she started dating Marine Corps veteran and entrepreneur John Wyche, after meeting him on Match.com. They announced their engagement in May 2017. "What can I say, except thank you Lord!!!... It's been a long time, this single life, and I thank you all for your prayers and kind words of hope," she wrote in an Instagram post dated January 21, 2017. "God has sent me true love. For all of you waiting on LOVE- don't give up – keep God first and he will see that you meet your match."

In August they exchanged their vows during a musical wedding in Montego Bay, Jamaica. Reggae Congo bands played as Lyte walked down the aisle, and the couple's friend Kelly Price serenaded them during the ceremony. Afterward, an intimate gathering with only close friends and family members was held. In August 2020 she filed for a divorce after three years of marriage.

She is an honorary member of Sigma Gamma Rho sorority.

== Discography ==
Studio albums

- Lyte as a Rock (1988)
- Eyes on This (1989)
- Act Like You Know (1991)
- Ain't No Other (1993)
- Bad as I Wanna B (1996)
- Seven & Seven (1998)
- Da Undaground Heat, Vol. 1 (2003)
- Legend (2015)
- 1 of 1 (2024)

Collaboration albums

- Almost September with Almost September (2008)

== Filmography ==
=== Film ===
| Year | Title | Role | Notes |
|---|---|---|---|
| 1992 | Fly by Night | Akusa | |
| 1997 | An Alan Smithee Film: Burn Hollywood Burn | Sista Tu Lumumba | |
| 1999 | A Luv Tale | Alia | |
| 2000 | Train Ride | Katrina Daniels | |
| 2002 | Civil Brand | Sgt. Cervantes | |
| 2003 | Playas Ball | Laquinta | |
| 2006 | Da Jammies | Syrin (voice) | Video |
| 2013 | The Dempsey Sisters | Taylor Powell | |
| 2017 | Patti Cake$ | DJ French Tips | |
| 2017 | Girls Trip | Herself | |
| 2019 | Loved to Death | Tiffany | |
| 2019 | Praying & Believing | Head Correction Officer | Short |
| 2020 | Bad Hair | Coral | |
| 2020 | Sylvie's Love | Mikki | |
| 2020 | Lost Girls: Angie's Story | Pastor Kim | |
| 2021 | Hip Hop Family Christmas | Tina Nixon | TV movie |
| 2022 | I, Challenger | Diane | |
| 2022 | Bury Me | Diane | |
| 2022 | Hip Hop Family Christmas Wedding | Tina Nixon | TV movie |
| 2023 | Favorite Son | Sister Mae | TV movie |
| 2024 | One Night Stay | Jasmine | TV movie |

=== Television ===
| Year | Title | Role | Notes |
|---|---|---|---|
| 1990–2003 | Showtime at the Apollo | Herself | Recurring Guest |
| 1991 | MTV Unplugged | Herself | Episode: "Yo! MTV Rap Unglugged" |
| 1992 | Sesame Street | Herself | Episode: "Episode 23.41" and "24.30" |
| 1992–2003 | Soul Train | Herself | Recurring Guest |
| 1995 | New York Undercover | Female Rapper | Episode: "You Get No Respect" |
| 1996 | Moesha | Herself | Episode: "A Concerted Effort: Part 2" |
| 1996 | New York Undercover | Herself | Episode: "Kill the Noise" |
| 1997 | All That | Herself | Episode: "MC Lyte" |
| 1998 | In the House | Lu Lu | Episode: "Working Overtime: Part 2" |
| 1998 | Cousin Skeeter | Herself | Episode: "A Family Thing" |
| 1998–2002 | For Your Love | Lana | Recurring Cast: Season 2–3, Guest: Season 5 |
| 1999 | Get Real | Beth Hunter | Episode: "Denial" |
| 2002 | The District | Karla | Episode: "Russian Winter" |
| 2003 | Platinum | Camille FaReal | Episode: "Loyalty" |
| 2003 | Strong Medicine | Nikki | Episode: "Prescriptions" |
| 2004 | Star Search | Herself/Judge | Main Judge |
| 2004 | Def Poetry Jam | Herself | Episode: "Episode 1.4" |
| 2004 | And You Don't Stop: 30 Years of Hip-Hop | Herself | Episode: "Back in the Day" |
| 2004 | My Wife & Kids | Herself | Episode: "The Return of Bobby Shaw" |
| 2004–2006 | Half & Half | Kai Owens | Recurring Cast: Season 2–4 |
| 2005 | Black in the 80s | Herself | Recurring Guest |
| 2005 | Love Lounge | Herself | Recurring Guest |
| 2005 | Kathy Griffin: My Life on the D-List | Herself | Episode: "Adjusted Gross" |
| 2011 | Regular Show | Demel-ishun (voice) | Episode: "Rap It Up" |
| 2011–2017 | Unsung | Herself | Recurring Guest |
| 2015 | Sisterhood of Hip Hop | Herself | Episode: "U-n-i-t-y" |
| 2017 | Tales | Makena Daniels | Episode: "Cold Hearted" |
| 2017 | The Comedy Underground Series | Herself/DJ | Main Guest |
| 2017–18 | Queen of the South | The Professor | Recurring Cast: Season 2, Guest: Season 3 |
| 2018 | Wild 'n Out | Herself | Episode: "International Women's Day Special" |
| 2018 | Growing Up Hip Hop: Atlanta | Herself | Episode: "Too Lit to Quit" and "In My Feelings" |
| 2018 | S.W.A.T. | DEA Special Agent Katrina 'KC' Walsh | Episode: "K-Town" and "Vendetta" |
| 2018 | Power | Jelani Otombre | Episode: "When This Is Over" |
| 2018–19 | Hip-Hop Evolution | Herself | Episode: "Do The Knowledge" & "Life After Death" |
| 2019 | Hip Hop Squares | Herself/DJ | Main DJ: Season 6 |
| 2019 | Untold Stories of Hip Hop | Herself | Episode: "Queen Latifah and Maino" |
| 2019 | Hip Hop: The Songs That Shook America | Herself | Episode: "Ladies First: 1989" |
| 2021 | Partners In Rhyme | Lana Crawford | Main Cast |
| 2022 | Kid's Crew | School Teacher (voice) | Recurring Cast |
| 2023 | Fight the Power: How Hip-Hop Changed the World | Herself | Episode: "Still Fighting" |

== Awards and nominations ==
=== Grammy Awards ===
| Year | Nominee / work | Award | Result |
|---|---|---|---|
| 1994 | "Ruffneck" | Best Rap Solo Performance | Nominated |
| 2004 | "Ride Wit Me" | Best Female Rap Vocal Performance | Nominated |

=== Soul Train Lady of Soul Awards ===
| Year | Nominee / work | Award | Result |
|---|---|---|---|
| 1995 | "You Want This" with Janet Jackson | Music Video of the Year | Nominated |
| 1996 | "Keep On Keepin' On" with Xscape | Best R&B/Soul or Rap Music Video | Won |

=== MTV Video Music Award ===
| Year | Nominee / work | Award | Result |
|---|---|---|---|
| 1995 | "I Wanna Be Down" featuring Brandy, Yo-Yo, and Queen Latifah | Best Rap Video | Nominated |

=== Billboard Music Awards ===
| Year | Nominee / work | Award | Result |
|---|---|---|---|
| 1997 | Herself | Top Rap Artist | Nominated |
| 1997 | "Cold Rock a Party" | Top Rap Song | Nominated |

=== BET Awards ===
| Year | Nominee / work | Award | Result |
|---|---|---|---|
| 2004 | Herself | Best Female Hip-Hop Artist | Nominated |

=== Other accolades ===
- 2006 – VH1 Hip Hop Honors – Honoree
- 2013 – Hip Hop Inaugural Ball – Honored with the Lifetime Achievement
- 2013 – BET Hip Hop Awards – Honored with the Icon Lifetime Achievement I Am Hip Hop Award for her contributions to hip-hop culture
- 2016 – Harvard University – Hutchins Center for African and African American Research's W. E. B. Du Bois Medal
- 2019 – Trumpet Awards – Trail Blazer Award
