= First Priority Music =

- Founded: 1987; 39 years ago
- Founder: Nat Robinson; (CEO)(1987-)
- Distributors: Atlantic; Virgin EMI; Zomba(United Kingdom); Warner Bros. Records (reissues) RCA
- Genre: Hip hop
- Country of origin: United States
- Location: New York City, New York, U.S.
- Official website: firstprioritymusic.com

First Priority Music (FPM) was an American hip hop record label of the late 1980s and early 1990s, which later released contemporary R&B and country music, among others.

== Record label ==
A small independent, it formed distribution relationships first with Atlantic Records, and later on with Jive/Zomba.

First Priority was founded by Nat Robinson in 1987, to release music by his son Kirk better known as Milk Dee of Audio Two. FPM's first release was Audio Two's "Make It Funky"/"Top Billin'", which was successful enough to secure the label a distribution deal with Atlantic Records.

MC Lyte's debut album Lyte as a Rock (1988) was followed by her records, Eyes on This (1989) and Act Like You Know (1991). "Ruffneck", from 1993's Ain't No Other, was the first gold single by a solo female rap artist. Other members of the hip hop roster of the period include Positive K, Michie Mee, Alliance, Kings of Swing, and Barsha. A compilation featuring FPM artists, The First Priority Music Family: Basement Flavor, was released by the label in 1988. A short-lived sub-label called Bum Rush was distributed by Atlantic then-sister label Virgin Records from 1989 to 1991.

Recent years saw releases by Jason Downs and the 2004 single by Eamon called "Fuck It (I Don't Want You Back)," which were released through Jive/Zomba.

== Artists ==
- Alliance
- Audio Two
- MC Lyte
- Eamon (singer)
- Positive K
- Proven Innocent
- Jason Downs
- Michie Mee
- Mekhi Phifer
