= Audio Two =

American hip hop duo

- Gizmo and Milk Dee

Background information
- Origin: Brooklyn, New York City, U.S.
- Genres: Hip hop
- Years active: 1985–1992
- Labels: First Priority; Atlantic
- Members: Kirk "Milk Dee" Robinson; Nat "Gizmo" Robinson

Audio Two was the Brooklyn, New York hip hop duo of emcee Kirk "Milk Dee" Robinson and DJ Nat "Gizmo" Robinson, best known for their first hit "Top Billin'".

== History ==
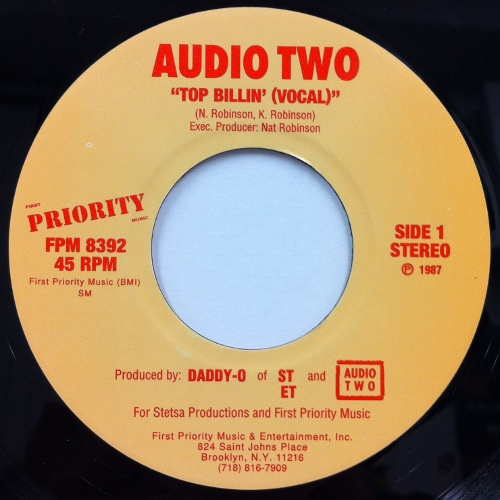
Audio Two's trademark song "Top Billin'" launched the duo to popularity.

The duo's debut single, "Make it Funky", was released in 1987, but it was the B-side, "Top Billin'", that became the chart hit. The beat — made by Milk Dee and produced by Daddy-O of Stetsasonic — and Milk Dee's lyrics would be sampled and referenced time and time again, even by the group itself: both the group's full-length debut, 1988's What More Can I Say? and its 1990 follow-up, I Don't Care: The Album, were titled after lines from the song. However, the duo would never recapture its initial success. The singles of its second album, "I Get the Papers" and "On the Road Again," were only moderate hits. It was a time of rapid change in the hip hop market; gangsta rap was rising in popularity, and Audio Two found itself unsuccessfully struggling to maintain recording contracts and a fanbase.

Audio Two did, however, pave the way for the duo's labelmate MC Lyte, who launched her career with the hit single I Cram to Understand U (Sam). Lyte's 1998 album Seven & Seven featured a remake of "Top Billin'" — with the original instrumental — this time a duet between her and Milk. It has been a widely circulated rumor that both members of Audio Two were brothers of MC Lyte; however, this is untrue. In 1994, Milk released a solo EP titled Never Dated on Rick Rubin's American Recordings. While the EP was notable for its single "Spam," a duet with the Beastie Boys' Ad-Rock with drum programming by Mike D, aside from the devoted Beastie Boys fanbase the album generated little interest. Milk eventually rediscovered success by producing the singer Eamon, who recorded the 2004 hit "Fuck It (I Don't Want You Back)."

In 2007, Milk Dee recorded a verse for a remix of "I Get Money" by 50 Cent, thanking all the music artists that sampled "Top Billin'," which earned him royalties.

In recent years, Audio Two member Gizmo became a recording engineer under the name "You Can Ask" Giz. His audio work has appeared on albums by Donell Jones, Calvin Richardson, Jaheim and Tyrese, among others.

== Discography ==
=== Studio albums ===
List of studio albums, with selected chart positions
Title	Album details	Peak chart positions	
Title	Album details	US	US R&B /HH
What More Can I Say?	Released: June 7, 1988; Label: First Priority Music/Atlantic; Formats: CD, LP, Cassette, digital download	185	45
I Don't Care: The Album	Released: April 17, 1990; Label: First Priority Music/Atlantic; Formats: CD, LP, Cassette	—	74
"—" denotes a recording that did not chart or was not released in that territory.

=== Unreleased albums ===
- The First Dead Indian (1992)

=== EPs ===
List of extended plays
Title	Details	Track listings
Flip-Flop Mini-Album (with The Alliance) (Note: "Published as "The Audio Two".)	Released: 1986; Label: First Priority; Formats: LP	Track listing: 1. "I Like Cherries"; 2. "Chillin'"; 3. "The Freshest Slowest Jam"; 4. "Where's The Fellas"; 5. "We Got The Beat Part II (Rough, Rough)"; 6. "Why Oh Girl"

=== Singles ===
==== As lead artist ====
List of singles, showing year released and album name
Title	Year	Peak chart positions	Album
Title	Year	US Rap	Album
"A Christmas Rhyme"	1985	—	Non-album single
"Make it Funky"	1987	—	What More Can I Say?
"Top Billin'"	1987	—	What More Can I Say?
"Hickeys Around My Neck"	1988	—	What More Can I Say?
"Many Styles/The Questions"	1988	—	What More Can I Say?
"I Don't Care"	1988	—	What More Can I Say?
"On The Road Again/Interlude One"	1990	16	I Don't Care: The Album
"I Get the Papers"	1990	—	I Don't Care: The Album
"—" denotes a recording that did not chart or was not released in that territory.
