= MC Lyte discography =

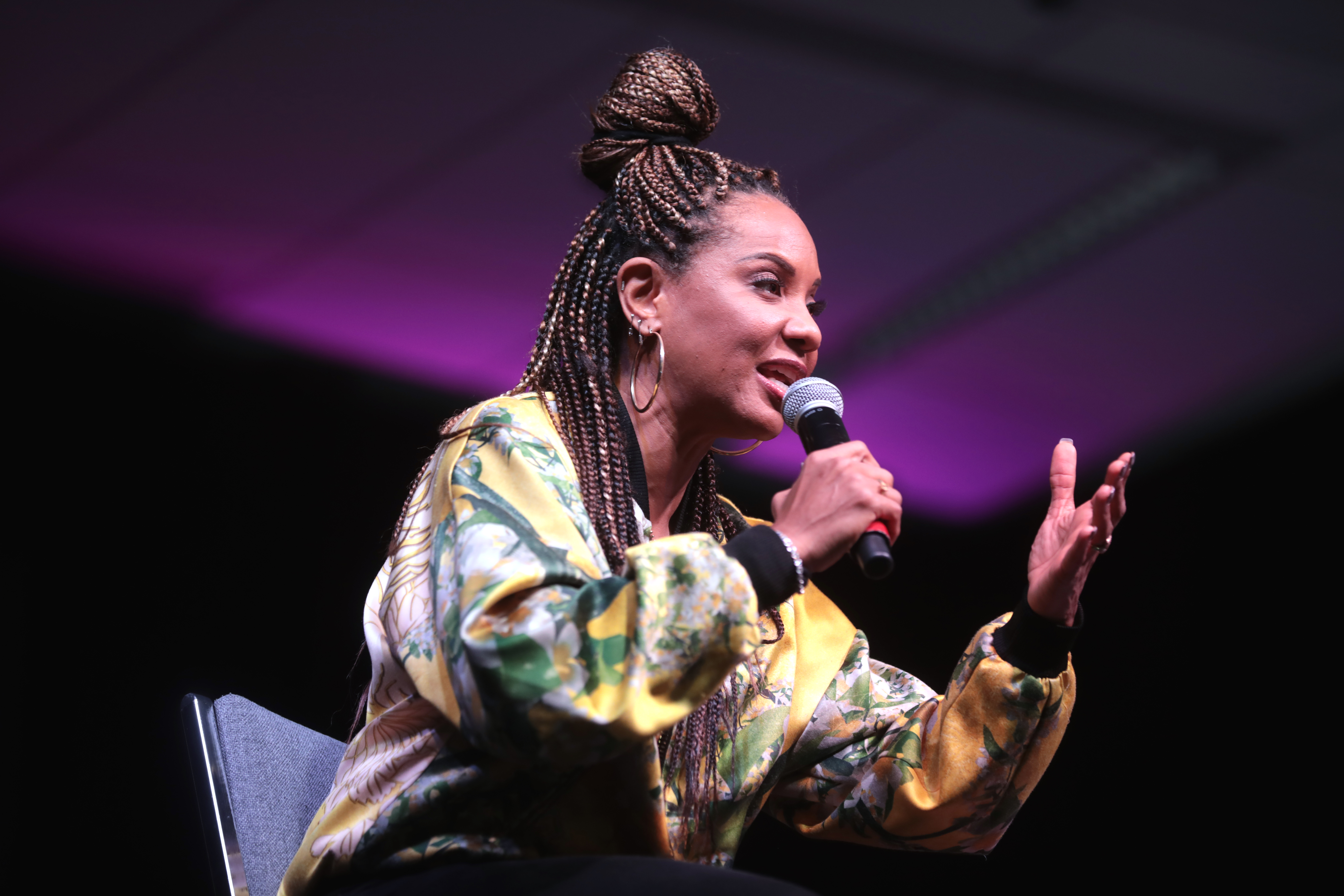
- Lyte in October 2019
- Studio albums: 9
- Extended plays: 3
- Compilation albums: 5
- Singles: 83
- Video albums: 2
- Music videos: 42
- Remix albums: 1
- Mixtapes: 1
- Promotional singles: 11

The following is the discography of MC Lyte, an American hip hop musician.

MC Lyte began her recording career in 1987 with "I Cram to Understand U (Sam)". In 1988, her collaboration with Sinéad O'Connor on "I Want Your (Hands on Me)" became her first single to reach the charts, appearing in England and New Zealand hit lists. That same year with her debut album Lyte as a Rock Lyte became the first woman to release a full-length Rap album as a solo artist. On October 21, 1989, her second album Eyes on This became the first by a female solo rapper to appear on the Billboard 200 (then called Billboard Top Pop Albums), on which it remained for 20 weeks, peaking No. 86 in November. It also peaking No. 6 on the Billboard Top Black Albums, the MC Lyte's highest position on this chart, as well as her first and only top 10 appearance. In December of the same year, she became the first woman to reach number one on the Billboard Rap Songs as lead artist with "Cha Cha Cha". In March 1992 "Poor Georgie" became her first song to chart on the Billboard 200. On November 30, 1993 "Ruffneck" became the first work by a female solo rapper to be certified gold by the RIAA. In September 1996 her fourth album Bad as I Wanna B peaked at No. 59 on the Billboard 200, the MC Lyte's highest position on this chart. In Germany, the album reached No. 95 on the Offizielle Top 100, becoming MC Lyte's first studio album to chart outside of the United States. Lyte's sixth studio album, Seven & Seven (1998), failed to chart on the Billboard main chart, as did her subsequent release Da Undaground Heat, Vol. 1 (2003), which was released independently. In September 2001 she published her first compilation album The Very Best of MC Lyte. In May 2008 he published an EP as part of the group The Almost September. In April 2015, more than 8 years after the release of her last solo studio album, MC Lyte publishes Legend.

In total 5 Lyte songs (4 as the main artist and one as part of the Stop the Violence Movement) would reach number one on Billboard Rap Songs and hold seven entries on the Billboard 200, reaching the top 10 with their collaboration on Janet Jackson's "You Want This" (number 8) and "Keep On Keepin' On" (number 10). Internationally, her most successful single in terms of commercial performance is arguably "Cold Rock a Party" (1996), which was certified platinum in New Zealand.

== Albums ==
=== Studio albums ===
List of studio albums with selected chart positions
Title	Album details	Peak chart positions			Sales
Title	Album details	US	US R&B /HH	GER	Sales
Lyte as a Rock	Released: April 19, 1988; Label: First Priority/Atlantic; Formats: CD, LP, Cassette, digital download, streaming	—	50	—	
Eyes on This	Released: October 3, 1989; Label: First Priority/Atlantic; Formats: CD, LP, Cassette, digital download, streaming	86	6	—	
Act Like You Know	Released: September 17, 1991; Label: First Priority/Atlantic; Formats: CD, LP, Cassette, digital download, streaming	102	14	—	
Ain't No Other	Released: June 22, 1993; Label: First Priority/Atlantic; Formats: CD, Cassette, digital download, streaming	90	16	—	US: 238,000 (as of 2007)
Bad As I Wanna B	Released: August 27, 1996; Label: East West/Elektra; Formats: CD, LP, Cassette, digital download, streaming	59	11	95	
Seven & Seven	Released: August 18, 1998; Label: East West/Elektra; Formats: CD, LP, Cassette, digital download, streaming	—	71	87	
Da Undaground Heat, Vol. 1	Released: March 18, 2003; Label: BMG (US) iMUSIC (EU) Cortex (AUS); Formats: CD	—	95	—	
Legend	Released: April 18, 2015; Label: Sunni Gyrl/Omnivore; Formats: LP	—	—	—	
1 of 1	Released: September 20, 2024; Label: Sunni Gyrl/My Block/Vydia; Formats: digital download, streaming	—	—	—	
"—" denotes a recording that did not chart or was not released in that territory.

=== Compilation albums ===
List of compilation albums
Title	Album details
The Very Best of MC Lyte	Released: September 4, 2001; Label: Rhino; Formats: CD
The Shit I Never Dropped	Released: August 12, 2003; Label: Unda Ground Kings; Formats: CD
Rhyme Masters	Released: October 4, 2005; Label: Flashback; Formats: CD, cassette
The Very Best of MC Lyte	Released: July 28, 2009; Label: Rhino/Elektra; Formats: digital download, streaming
Cold Rock a Party – Best of MC Lyte	Released: May 25, 2019; Label: X5 Music Group/Warner; Formats: digital download, streaming

=== Mixtapes ===
List of mixtapes
Title	Mixtape details	Track listing
The Oracle (Xtra Files Pt. 1) (compilation – with DJ Flipcyide)	Released: July 28, 2017; Label: self-released; Formats: CD, digital download	Track listing: 1. "Intro"; 2. "Love" (as part of Almost September; feat. KRS-One & Sleepy Brown); 3. "Wonder Years" (with DJ Premier; feat. Shabeeno); 4. "Hot Dam" (feat. Sadat X); 5. "The League" (Wildchild feat. Special Ed, Percee P, MC Lyte & Masta Ace); 6. "16, 17, 18" (with KRS-One & AlBe Back); 7. "Let It Fall (Mudloop Remix)" (Lin Que feat. MC Lyte); 8. "Tell Me" (Erick Sermon feat. MC Lyte & Rah Digga); 9. "Closer To My Dreams" (Charles Hamilton feat. MC Lyte)

=== Remix albums ===
List of remix albums
Title	Album details
Badder Than B-Fore	Released: November 10, 1997; Label: East West; Formats: CD, digital download

== EPs ==
List of extended plays
Title	Details
Lyte of a Decade (compilation)	Released: April 23, 1996; Label: East West; Formats: CD, cassette
Rhino Hi-Five: MC Lyte (compilation)	Released: April 24, 2007; Label: Rhino; Formats: digital download
Almost September (as part of Almost September)	Released: May 6, 2008; Label: One; Formats: CD, digital download

== Singles ==
=== As lead artist ===
List of singles, with selected chart positions and certifications, showing year released and album name
Title	Year	Peak chart positions										Certifications	Album
Title	Year	US	US R&B	US Rap	BEL	CAN	GER	NLD	NZ	SWI	UK	Certifications	Album
"I Cram to Understand U (Sam)" (with DJ K-Rock)	1987	—	—	*	—	—	—	—	—	—	—		Lyte as a Rock
"10% Dis"	1988	—	—	*	—	—	—	—	—	—	—		Lyte as a Rock
"Paper Thin"	1988	—	—	*	—	—	—	—	—	—	—		Lyte as a Rock
"Lyte as a Rock"	1988	—	—	*	—	—	—	—	—	—	—		Lyte as a Rock
"I'm Not Havin' It" (with Positive K)	1989	—	—	16	—	—	—	—	—	—	—		The First Priority Music Family: Basement Flavor
"Cha Cha Cha"	1989	—	35	1	—	—	—	—	—	—	—		Eyes on This
"Stop, Look, Listen" (with DJ K-Rock)	1990	—	—	9	—	—	—	—	—	—	—		Eyes on This
"Cappucino"	1990	—	—	8	—	—	—	—	—	—	—		Eyes on This
"When in Love"	1991	—	14	3	—	—	—	—	—	—	—		Act Like You Know
"Poor Georgie"	1991	83	11	1	—	—	—	—	—	—	—		Act Like You Know
"Eyes Are the Soul"	1992	—	84	—	—	—	—	—	—	—	—		Act Like You Know
"Ice Cream Dream"	1992	—	—	11	—	—	—	—	—	—	—		Mo' Money (soundtrack)
"Ruffneck"	1993	35	10	1	—	—	—	—	—	—	67	RIAA: Gold	Ain't No Other
"I Go On"	1993	— (Note: "I Go On" did not enter the Billboard Hot 100, but peaked at number 16 on the Bubbling Under Hot 100.)	68	27	—	—	—	—	—	—	—		Ain't No Other
"Keep On, Keepin' On" (featuring Xscape)	1996	10	3	2	—	—	32	38	18	41	27	RIAA: Gold	Sunset Park (soundtrack) / Bad As I Wanna B
"Everyday"	1996	—	— (Note: "Everyday" did not enter the Hot R&B/Hip-Hop Songs, but peaked at number 44 on the R&B/Hip-Hop Airplay.)	—	—	—	—	—	—	—	81		Bad As I Wanna B
"Cold Rock a Party" (Bad Boy Remix) (featuring Missy Elliott)	1996	11	5	1	12	11	15	36	1	22	15	RIAA: Gold; RMNZ: Platinum	Bad As I Wanna B
"Druglord Superstar (Milk Remix)"	1997	—	—	—	—	—	—	—	—	—	—		Badder Than B-Fore
"I Can't Make a Mistake"	1998	—	—	—	—	—	—	—	—	—	46		Seven & Seven
"It's All Yours" (featuring Gina Thompson)	1998	—	—	—	—	—	—	—	—	—	36		Seven & Seven
"It's On" (Note: "It's On" was released as a split single with "It's Da Biz" by Biz Markie.)	2001	—	—	—	—	—	—	—	—	—	—		Non-album single
"Fighting Temptation" (with Beyoncé, Missy Elliott & Free)	2003	—	—	—	37	34	54	13	—	42	—		The Fighting Temptations (soundtrack)
"Can I Get It Now"	2005	—	—	—	—	—	—	—	—	—	—		Non-album singles
"Don't Walk Away" (with Meechie)	2005	—	—	—	—	—	—	—	—	—	—		Non-album singles
"Mad At Me"	2007	—	—	—	—	—	—	—	—	—	—		Non-album singles
"Juke Joint"	2008	—	—	—	—	—	—	—	—	—	—		Non-album singles
"Get Lyte"	2008	—	—	—	—	—	—	—	—	—	—		Non-album singles
"You Cut"	2008	—	—	—	—	—	—	—	—	—	—		Non-album singles
"Brooklyn"	2009	—	—	—	—	—	—	—	—	—	—		Non-album singles
"Rockin' with the Best"	2009	—	—	—	—	—	—	—	—	—	—		The Oracle (Xtra Files Pt. 1)
"All Over Me/Home"	2009	—	—	—	—	—	—	—	—	—	—		Non-album singles
"Dada da Da"	2011	—	—	—	—	—	—	—	—	—	—		Non-album singles
"Dopestyle"	2012	—	—	—	—	—	—	—	—	—	—		SLAM x Mick Boogie Present: Brooklyn Originals Mixtape
"Cravin'" (featuring Stan Carrizosa)	2013	—	—	—	—	—	—	—	—	—	—		Legend
"This Is Your Life" (with Psyko Punkz & Chris Willis)	2014	—	—	—	—	—	—	—	—	—	—		Non-album single
"Dear John" (featuring Common & 10Beats)	2014	—	—	—	—	—	—	—	—	—	—		Legend
"Ball" (featuring Lil' Mama & AV)	2014	—	—	—	—	—	—	—	—	—	—		Legend
"Check"	2015	—	—	—	—	—	—	—	—	—	—		Legend
"Money on My Mind" (featuring AVY)	2017	—	—	—	—	—	—	—	—	—	—		Non-album single
"Revolution"	2018	—	—	—	—	—	—	—	—	—	—		The Best of Vintage Hip-Hop: The Lost Tapes Series, Vol. 2
"9 To 5" (featuring Cheyenne Lavene)	2018	—	—	—	—	—	—	—	—	—	—		Non-album singles
"Wide Awake" (featuring V. Bozeman)	2018	—	—	—	—	—	—	—	—	—	—		Non-album singles
"SpotLyte" (featuring Zay)	2018	—	—	—	—	—	—	—	—	—	—		Non-album singles
"Get It Started" (featuring Shah)	2018	—	—	—	—	—	—	—	—	—	—		Non-album singles
"Easy" (featuring Lil Mama & Brookelynn)	2018	—	—	—	—	—	—	—	—	—	—		Non-album singles
"Anything" (featuring AV & JoiStaRR)	2018	—	—	—	—	—	—	—	—	—	—		Non-album singles
"Thick Chick" (with Juju Bacardi)	2021	—	—	—	—	—	—	—	—	—	—		Non-album singles
"Partners in Rhyme Unstoppable'" (with Precious Way & Xhaania)	2021	—	—	—	—	—	—	—	—	—	—		Partners in Rhyme Soundtrack
"Woman" (featuring Salt, Big Daddy Kane & Raheem DeVaughn)	2024	—	—	—	—	—	—	—	—	—	—		1 of 1
"Mood For You" (with Lalah Hathaway)	2024	—	—	—	—	—	—	—	—	—	—		Vantablack
"King King" (with Queen Latifah)	2024	—	—	—	—	—	—	—	—	—	—		1 of 1
"Thank You" (featuring Mary Mary & Muni Long)	2024	—	—	—	—	—	—	—	—	—	—		1 of 1
"Make A Livin'"	2024	—	—	—	—	—	—	—	—	—	—		1 of 1
"Realest Whine'" (with Briannagh D)	2025	—	—	—	—	—	—	—	—	—	—		Non-album single
"—" denotes a recording that did not chart or was not released in that territory. "*" indicates a chart that did not exist at the time.

=== Featured singles ===
List of singles as featured artist, with selected chart positions and certifications, showing year released and album name
Title	Year	Peak chart positions												Certifications	Album
Title	Year	US	US Dance	US R&B	US Rap	AUS	CAN	GER	NLD	NZ	SPA	SWE	UK	Certifications	Album
"I Want Your (Hands on Me)" (Sinéad O'Connor featuring MC Lyte)	1988	—	—	—	*	—	—	—	—	40	—	—	77		The Lion & the Cobra
"Victory Is Calling" (Michie Mee and L.A. Luv featuring MC Lyte)	1988	—	—	—	*	—	—	—	—	—	—	—	—		The First Priority Music Family: Basement Flavor
"Self Destruction" (as part of Stop the Violence Movement)	1989	—	— (Note: "Self Destruction" did not enter the Dance Club Songs, but peaked at number 7 on the Dance/Electronic Singles Sales.)	30	1	—	—	—	—	33	—	—	75	RIAA: Gold	Non-album single
"Dr. Soul" (Foster & McElroy featuring MC Lyte)	1989	—	—	10	—	—	—	—	—	—	—	—	—		FM2
"I Ain't Lyin'" (Sinbad featuring MC Lyte)	1990	—	—	90	—	—	—	—	—	—	—	—	—		Brain Damaged
"Heal Yourself" (as part of H.E.A.L. Human Education Against Lies)	1991	—	—	—	—	—	—	—	—	—	—	—	—		Civilization vs. Technology
"You Want This" (Janet Jackson featuring MC Lyte)	1994	8	9	9	—	16	15	90	37	11	—	—	14	RIAA: Gold	janet. Remixed
"Can't Hang" (Xscape featuring MC Lyte)	1996	50	— (Note: "Can't Hang/Do You Want To" did not enter the Dance Club Songs, but peaked at number 3 on the Dance/Electronic Singles Sales.)	9	—	—	—	—	—	—	—	—	—		Off the Hook
"Come On" (Billy Lawrence featuring MC Lyte)	1997	44	— (Note: "Come On" did not enter the Dance Club Songs, but peaked at number 18 on the Dance/Electronic Singles Sales.)	19	—	—	—	—	—	28	—	—	—		Set It Off (soundtrack) / Paradise
"Let's Get Funk" (Mellowman featuring MC Lyte)	1997	—	—	—	—	—	—	—	—	—	—	—	—		Au Jour Le Jour
"I'm Leavin' U (Gotta Go Gotta Go)" (Bootsy Collins featuring MC Lyte)	1997	—	—	—	—	—	—	59	—	—	—	—	79		Fresh Outta 'P' University
"Curious" (LSG featuring LL Cool J, Busta Rhymes and MC Lyte)	1998	—	—	—	—	—	—	70	—	—	—	—	23		Levert.Sweat.Gill
"Jammin'" (Bob Marley featuring MC Lyte)	2000	—	—	—	—	—	—	—	54	—	10	59	42		Chant Down Babylon
"Time for a Change" (The Rapsody featuring MC Lyte, Khaled & Danacee)	2000	—	—	—	—	—	—	—	—	—	—	—	—		Hip Hop Meets World
"Roots Love & Culture" (Tre Hardson featuring MC Lyte)	2002	—	—	—	—	—	—	—	—	—	—	—	—		Liberation
"Girlfriend's Story" (Gemma Fox featuring MC Lyte)	2004	—	—	—	—	—	—	—	—	—	—	—	38		Messy
"Money" (KRS-One featuring MC Lyte)	2007	—	—	—	—	—	—	—	—	—	—	—	—		Adventures in Emceein
"Beautiful" (as part of Almost September)	2007	—	—	—	—	—	—	—	—	—	—	—	—		Almost September
"Love" (as part of Almost September; featuring KRS-One & Sleepy Brown)	2008	—	—	—	—	—	—	—	—	—	—	—	—		Almost September
"Lay Down Slow" (Medusa featuring MC Lyte)	2011	—	—	—	—	—	—	—	—	—	—	—	—		Whrs the DJ Booth?
"That's Still the Way" (Bishop Brigante featuring MC Lyte & Sticky Fingaz)	2017	—	—	—	—	—	—	—	—	—	—	—	—		Legacy
"Dare to Change the World" (Denise Lopez featuring MC Lyte)	2018	—	—	—	—	—	—	—	—	—	—	—	—		Non-album singles
"Shut the F... Up (Street Version)" (Paula Perry featuring MC Lyte)	2018	—	—	—	—	—	—	—	—	—	—	—	—		Non-album singles
"I'm Still Not Havin' It" (Positive K featuring MC Lyte)	2019	—	—	—	—	—	—	—	—	—	—	—	—		Non-album singles
"Can't Help Myself" (Sir the Baptist featuring Saint Ashleey, Estelle, MC Lyte, Syleena Johnson, Ann Nesby and The Boys & Girls Club of the Gulf Coast)	2020	—	—	—	—	—	—	—	—	—	—	—	—		Non-album singles
"Know the Game" (Hindustani featuring MC Lyte)	2020	—	—	—	—	—	—	—	—	—	—	—	—		Non-album singles
"Mom the Bounty Hunter" (Keke Palmer featuring MC Lyte)	2023	—	—	—	—	—	—	—	—	—	—	—	—		My Dad the Bounty Hunter: Season 2 (soundtrack)
"JAM" (Ray Chew featuring Stephanie Mills, MC Lyte, Doug E. Fresh & Kid Capri)	2024	—	—	—	—	—	—	—	—	—	—	—	—		Non-album singles
"Too Bold" (Van Van featuring MC Lyte, Da Brat & Rapsody)	2024	—	—	—	—	—	—	—	—	—	—	—	—		Non-album singles
"Back Like I Never Left" (LG Roc featuring MC Lyte)	2025	—	—	—	—	—	—	—	—	—	—	—	—		Non-album singles
"—" denotes a recording that did not chart or was not released in that territory.

=== Promotional singles ===
List of singles, showing year released and album name
Title	Year	Album
"All That" (featuring Dana Eaves)	1991	Act Like You Know
"Act Like You Know"	1991	Act Like You Know
"I Wanna Be Down (Human Rhythm Hip Hop Remix)" (Brandy featuring MC Lyte, Queen Latifah & Yo-Yo)	1994	Non-album single
"T.R.G. (The Rap Game)"	1996	Bad as I Wanna B
"Have U Ever (Sharam Jey Mix)"	1997	Bad as I Wanna B
"I Like" (Shiro featuring MC Lyte)	1998	Caught Up (soundtrack)
"Woo Woo (Party Time)" (featuring Nicci Gilbert)	1998	Woo (soundtrack) / Seven & Seven
"Party Going On" (featuring Inaya Day) (Note: "Party Going On" was released as a split single with "Top Billin'" by Audio Two.)	1998	Seven & Seven
"Ride Wit Me"	2002	Da Undaground Heat, Vol. 1
"No Deals" (featuring Ericka Yancey) (Note: "No Deals" was released as a split single with "Trouble Again" by John Forté featuring Tricky.)	2002	Dark Angel (soundtrack)
"Let’s Get Loud (The ESPN ESPY Anthem)" (as part of the Spitballers)	2003	Non-album single

== Guest appearances ==
List of non-single guest appearances, with other performing artists, showing year released and album name
Title	Year	Other artist(s)	Album
"Survival of the Fittest"	1988	—N/a	The First Priority Music Family: Basement Flavor
"Start It Up Y'All"	1990	Audio Two, Positive K	I Don't Care: The Album
"6teen" (uncredited)	1990	Audio Two	I Don't Care: The Album
"Friends & Respect"	1994	Buju Banton, KRS-One, Kool G Rap, LL Cool J, Little Shawn, Martin Lawrence, Pete Rock, Positive K, Q-Tip, Queen Latifah, Spike Lee, Treach	Nuttin' but Love
"Sticka"	1994	Terminator X, Chuck D, Ice Cube, Ice-T, Punk Barbarians	Super Bad
"Do Me Rugged"	1994	Proven Innocent	It's On 12"
"Freedom (Theme from Panther)" (Rap Version)	1995	Meshell Ndegeocello, Nefertiti, Patra, Queen Latifah, Salt-N-Pepa, Lisa "Left Eye" Lopes, Da 5 Footaz, & Yo-Yo	Panther (soundtrack)
"You Bring Me Joy" (E-Smoove's Soul Mix)	1995	Mary J. Blige & Lin Que	"You Bring Me Joy" 12"
"Taking It Lyte"	1996	Lord Finesse	The Awakening
"One for the Cuties"	1996	Yo-Yo	Total Control
"Hip Hop Props: (MC Lyte)"	1996	UTFO	The Best of U.T.F.O.
"Keep on Pushin'"	1997	Bahamadia, Nonchalant, Yo-Yo	Dangerous Ground (soundtrack)
"Keep It Movin"	1999	Monica Payne	Wild Wild West (soundtrack)
"Who Am I"	1999	Will Smith, Tatyana Ali	Willennium
"A Film Called (Pimp)"	2000	Common, Bilal	Like Water for Chocolate
"La Da Di"	2001	Regina Belle	This Is Regina!
"Dark Angel Theme"	2002	Public Enemy	Dark Angel Soundtrack
"Jam for the Ladies"	2002	Moby, Angie Stone	18
"Tell Me"	2002	Erick Sermon, Rah Digga	React
"We Can't Be Stopped"	2003	Muskabeatz	Muskabeatz
"Mash Out"	2003	will.i.am, Fergie	Must B 21
"The Mackin' Game"	2004	Teena Marie, Medusa	La Doña
"What You Won't Do for Love"	2004	Boyz II Men	Throwback, Vol. 1
"B.K to the Bay"	2005	Kontac & Erase E	They Got Some Sh**t on Here
"Partyverlauf"	2005	DJ Tomekk, Mike K. Downing, Icebear, Siamak	Numma Eyns
"Wonder Years"	2006	DJ Premier, Shabeeno	God Vs Tha Devil
"Listen Up"	2007	—N/a	Top Shelf 8/8/88
"The League"	2007	Wildchild, Special Ed, Masta Ace, Percee P	Jack of All Trades
"They Stole My Radio"	2008	The Lady Tigra	Please Mr. BoomBox
"That's What Girls Are Made For"	2009	Katt Williams, E-40	It's Pimpin' Pimpin'
"Psalms 23"	2009	India Arie	Testimony: Vol. 2, Love & Politics
"The Pressure"	2009	Teena Marie	Congo Square
"JukeBox"	2010	Kidz in the Hall	Land of Make Believe
"In the Game"	2011	Nikkiya	Speakher
"Really (Skit)"	2012	Macy Gray	Covered
"Nasty Thang"	2013	Sheila E.	Icon
"Show Me Love"	2015	Mellow Man Ace	Restoring Order
"No Place"	2016	Golden Child	Golden Rule
"1986"	2016	Mexican Institute of Sound, Toy Selectah	Compass
"Holdin' On"	2016	Eric Benét	Eric Benét
"MC Lyte"	2018	—N/a	Top Shelf 1988
"Well Well Well"	2019	Warryn Campbell, Jason McGee & The Choir	Warryn Campbell Presents My Block Inc.
"Feelings"	2019	Big Daddy Kane	The Best of Vintage Hip-Hop: The Lost Tapes Series, Vol. 1
"M.U.S.I.C."	2019	—N/a	The Best of Vintage Hip-Hop: The Lost Tapes Series, Vol. 1

== Videography ==
=== Video albums ===
List of video albums
Title	Details	Notes
Lyte Years	Released: November 12, 1991; Label: A*Vision/Atlantic; Formats: VHS	Features interviews and behind-the-scenes footage.; Contains the music videos for "When I Love", "Eyes Are The Soul", "Lyte As A Rock", "Paper Thin", "I'm Not Having It", "Cha Cha Cha", "Stop, Look & Listen" and "Cappucino".
MC Lyte: Live at the BurnLounge Download	Released: 2006; Label: BurnLounge; Formats: DVD	Video album recorded live in the spring of 2006 in Las Vegas, Nevada.; Contains a live performance of "Paper Thin", "Cha Cha Cha", "Poor Georgie", "Self Destruction", "Ruffneck" and "Wonder Years".

=== Music videos ===
==== As lead artist ====
List of music videos as lead artist, showing year released and director(s)
Title	Year	Director(s)
"Paper Thin"	1988	Lionel C. Martin
"Lyte as a Rock"	1988	Lionel C. Martin
"I'm Not Havin' It" (with Positive K)	1989	Lionel C. Martin
"Cha Cha Cha"	1989	Tamra Davis
"Stop, Look, Listen" (with DJ K-Rock)	1990	
"Cappucino"	1990	Ric Menello
"When in Love"	1991	
"Poor Georgie"	1991	
"Eyes Are the Soul"	1992	
"Ice Cream Dream"	1992	
"Ruffneck"	1993	Pamela Birkhead
"I Go On"	1993	Pamela Birkhead
"Keep On, Keepin' On" (featuring Xscape)	1996	Paul Boyd
"Keep On, Keepin' On" (Version 2) (featuring Xscape)	1996	Jada Pinkett Smith
"Everyday"	1996	Michael Lucero
"Cold Rock a Party (Bad Boy Remix)" (featuring Missy Elliott)	1996	Cameron Casey
"I Can't Make a Mistake"	1998	Christopher Erskin
"Ride wit Me"	2003	MC Lyte and Indra
"Wonder Years" (featuring DJ Premier & Shabeeno)	2006	
"Brooklyn"	2009	
"Cravin'" (featuring Stan Carrizosa)	2013	Ron Yuan
"This Is Your Life" (with Psyko Punkz & Chris Willis)	2014	
"Dear John" (featuring Common & 10Beats)	2014	
"Ball" (featuring Lil' Mama & AV)	2014	Ron Yuan
"Check"	2015	Lynn Richardson

==== As featured artist ====
List of music videos as featured artist, showing year released and director(s)
Title	Year	Director(s)
"I Want Your (Hands on Me) (Sinéad O'Connor featuring MC Lyte)	1988	John Maybury
"Night of the Living Baseheads (Public Enemy featuring MC Lyte)	1988	Lionel C. Martin
"Self Destruction" (As part of Stop the Violence Movement)	1989	Ralph McDaniels and Lionel C. Martin
"Dr. Soul" (Foster & McElroy featuring MC Lyte)	1989	
"Heal Yourself" (As part of H.E.A.L. Human Education Against Lies)	1991	Ted Demme and Fab Five Freddy
"You Want This" (Janet Jackson featuring MC Lyte)	1994	Keir McFarlane
"I Wanna Be Down" (Remix) (Brandy featuring MC Lyte, Queen Latifah, Yo-Yo)	1994	Hype Williams
"Freedom" (Rap Version) (With various artists)	1995	Antoine Fuqua
"Can't Hang" (Xscape featuring MC Lyte)	1996	Lionel C. Martin
"Come On" (Billy Lawrence featuring MC Lyte)	1997	Liz Friedlander
"Let's Get Funk" (Mellowman featuring MC Lyte)	1997	
"I'm Leavin' U (Gotta Go Gotta Go)" (Bootsy Collins featuring MC Lyte)	1997	Philipp Stölzl
"Curious" (LSG featuring LL Cool J, Busta Rhymes and MC Lyte)	1998	Paul Hunter
"I Like" (Shiro featuring MC Lyte)	1998	Frank Sacramento
"Jammin'" (Bob Marley featuring MC Lyte)	2000	Frank Sacramento
"Girlfriend's Story" (Gemma Fox featuring MC Lyte)	2004	
"Dare to Change the World" (Denise Lopez featuring MC Lyte)	2018	Jay Visualz
"Shut the F... Up (Street Version)" (Paula Perry featuring MC Lyte)	2018	
""I'm Still Not Havin' It" (Positive K featuring MC Lyte)	2019	
"Can't Help Myself" (Sir the Baptist featuring Saint Ashleey, Estelle, MC Lyte, Syleena Johnson, Ann Nesby and The Boys & Girls Club of the Gulf Coast)	2020	
