= Dear John =

Dear John may refer to:

- Dear John letter, a break-up letter to an absent boyfriend or husband

== Film and television ==
- Dear John (1964 film), a 1964 Swedish film
- "Dear John", an episode of Yanks Go Home
- Dear John (British TV series), a 1986–1987 British sitcom
- Dear John (American TV series), a 1988–1992 American sitcom, originally based on the British show
- Dear John (2010 film), a film based on the Nicholas Sparks novel (see below)

== Literature ==
- Dear John (novel), a 2007 novel by Nicholas Sparks
- "Dear John", a column written for The Stage (UK) newspaper by John Byrne
- Dear John: The Road to Pelindaba, 2018 book about Mark Constantine's search for his father

== Music ==
- "Dear John" (Hank Williams song), the A-side of the 1951 single "Cold, Cold Heart"
- "Dear John" (Taylor Swift song) (2010)
- "Dear John (MC Lyte song)", a song by MC Lyte from their 2016 album Legend
- "Dear John" (Status Quo song) (1982)
- "Dear John" (Eddi Reader song) from her 1994 eponymous album
- "A Dear John Letter" or "Dear John", a 1953 song by Ferlin Husky and Jean Shepard
- "Dear John", a song by Pat Boone, Dot Records 7" 45-16152, reached #44 in US charts in 1960
- "Dear John", a song by the Scottish hard rock band Nazareth, from their self-titled debut album (1971)
- "Dear John" by John Lennon, from John Lennon Anthology (1980)
- "Dear John", a song by Elton John from Jump Up! (1982)
- "Dear John", an instrumental on the Freddie Hubbard album Bolivia (1991)
- "Dear John", a song by Cyndi Lauper from her 1993 album Hat Full of Stars
- "Dear John", a song by Klymaxx from One Day (1994)
- "Dear John", a song by Styx from their 1997 album Return to Paradise
- Dear John, a 1999 album by Ilse DeLange
- "Dear John Letter", a song by Whitney Houston from her 2002 album Just Whitney...
- "Dear John", a song by Aimee Mann from The Forgotten Arm (2005)
- "Dear John", a song by Ryan Adams from his 2005 album Jacksonville City Nights
- "dearjohn", a song by Musiq Soulchild from the 2008 album OnMyRadio
- Dear John, a 2009 album by Loney, Dear
- "Dear John", a song by Amerie from In Love & War (2009)
- "Dear John", a 2010 song by Jessie James Decker
- "Dear John", a song by James from their 2016 album Girl at the End of the World
- "Dear John" (parts 1 & 2), songs by Jaguar Wright from her 2005 album Divorcing Neo 2 Marry Soul

== See also ==
- "Dear John Letter (To the Devil)", a song by Keith Green from No Compromise
- "Dear Johnny", a song by Poe from Haunted
