= 1 of 1 =

1 of 1 may refer to:

- 1 of 1 (MC Lyte album), 2024
- 1 of 1 (Shinee album), 2016 and the title track
- 1 of 1 (Sech album), 2020
- 1 of 1, an EP by Maluma and Blessd
- "1 of 1", a 2016 song by Tyga
