= Almost September =

EP by Almost September
- Released: May 27, 2008
- Recorded: 2007–2008
- Genres: East Coast hip hop, hip hop soul, neo soul
- Length: 25:17
- Label: One Records/NEO/Sony Music
- Producers: J-Lee and Whitey (Whiteleaf Productions)

MC Lyte chronology
Rhino Hi-Five: MC Lyte (2007)	Almost September (2008)	Legend (2015)

Almost September (also referred to as The Almost September EP) is the debut EP by American neo soul/hip hop group Almost September, composed of MC Lyte, Jared Lee Gosselin and Whitey White. It was released on May 6, 2008, via One Records and featured production from Gosselin and White.

== Background ==
The members of the group met in 2007 during the recording of Big by Macy Gray and quickly began recording, which resulted in their first song "Beautiful", released on iTunes in December of that year. Regarding the creation of the group, Jared Lee told "MC Lyte came to a session that Whitey and I were working. She came back to the studio the next day and we recorded the song "Beautiful". She said she wanted to start a group with me and Whitey. It only took us about a month to decide if we wanted to start the group." That month during a note with MTV their manager Michael "Blue" Williams said the trio have a "grown-up rap" feel that mixes Lyte's rhymes with soulful funk akin to the Brand New Heavies. On the name of the group Lyte explained to the website Rock the Bells "We said 'What can we name the group? So it was like 'let's take 'em back to school: Almost September'. The title of the group had a lot to do with retooling and re-schooling heads on how you could mix meaningful lyrics with soulful music. Much like how it was done back in the day with Pete Rock & CL Smooth, Gang Starr and Guru, that kind of feel."

In May 2008 the EP was released, that same month they also released the single "Love", with KRS-One and Organized Noize's Sleepy Brown as guest artists. That song were playlisted on BBC Radio 1Xtra. In a note to AllHipHop, Lyte commented on the content of the EP:

You can struggle and try to make it happen but if you're going to compete with all the other sites, you're going to need some help. In essence, the beginning of this group, is been making me stronger and me making them stronger. The content varies. We talk about good music, we talk about the revolution that's lacking in today's market place (...) The content varies. We talk about good music, we talk about the revolution that's lacking in today's market place.

Later the group embarks on a tour in Europe, performing in countries like UK and Germany.

== Critical reception ==
Professional ratings
Review scores
Source	Rating
RapReviews	7.5/10

Matt Jost of RapReviews commented that is the Lyte "most professional return since Bad as I Wanna B back in '96" commented that "Without being nostalgic, "The Almost September EP" possesses a timeless touch, which is what you'd expect from the collaboration between young Grammy-nominated and -winning producers and a rap pioneer who always kept in touch."

At the time of the singles release, Soul Bounce commented on Beautiful "is a heater. I'm loving how they freaked out that Thelma Houston "Don't Leave Me This Way" sample." and about Love "kicks off with KRS-One urging folks not to fall in love but to rise in it, then he passes the mic to Lyte who kicks a few verses on the subject."

In retrospect, Todd "Stereo" Williams of Rock the Bells wrote "rich with soulful sounds and some of Lyte's most effervescent rhymes."

== Track listing ==
All tracks are written by Lana Moorer, Jared Lee Gosselin and Phillip White. Track 1 is additionally written by Lawrence Parker.

Almost September track listing
No.	Title	Length
1.	"Love" (featuring KRS-One and Sleepy Brown)	3:29
2.	"Beautiful"	3:24
3.	"Stay"	3:42
4.	"Infatuation" (featuring Mika Lett)	3:36
5.	"Revolution"	3:53
6.	"Fly Away"	3:26
Total length:		21:50

European CD release bonus track
No.	Title	Length
7.	"The Best Day"	3:47
Total length:		25:28
