= Eyes Are the Soul =

1992 single by MC Lyte

Single by MC Lyte

from the album Act Like You Know
- B-side: "Eyes Are the Soul" (LP Version)
- Released: April 9, 1992
- Genre: Golden age hip hop
- Length: 4:30
- Label: First Priority, Atlantic Records
- Songwriters: Lana Moorer, Epic Mazur, Richard Wolf
- Producers: Wolf & Epic

MC Lyte singles chronology
"Poor Georgie" (1991)	"Eyes Are the Soul" (1992)	"Ice Cream Dream" (1992)

Cover in cassette format

Music video
- "Eyes Are the Soul " on YouTube

"Eyes Are the Soul" is the third and final single from MC Lyte's third album Act Like You Know. Produced by Wolf & Epic, it was released on April 9, 1992.

In the song Lyte talks about social issues such as AIDS, crack and teenage pregnancy.

== Conception and composition ==
In each verse of the song, Lyte describes a different afflicted person. The first person in the narrative is a male with HIV–AIDS, the second person is a crack addict wanted by the law, and the third is a young, black, pregnant teenager who is considering abortion.

Shortly after the single was released, speaking at a Baltimore school, she confessed that "Sometimes I get discouraged when I do songs like this and they don't get as popular as (others). I'm just trying to get the message out."

During an interview with Ebony in 2012, Lyte commented on the song's AIDS prevention message:

"I can't even tell you that I had lost someone or that I knew of anyone who had lost someone(...) I just knew this disease was on its way to causing devastation in the world, but specifically in our communities, and that knowledge just scared the mess out of me."

== Appearances ==
"Eyes Are the Soul" was included on her compilation albums The Very Best of MC Lyte (2001), Rhyme Masters (2005), and Cold Rock a Party – Best of MC Lyte (2019) The music video was included on the compilation video album Lyte Years (1991).

== Critical reception ==
Connie Johnson of the Los Angeles Times highlighted the song in her album review, saying "AIDS, crack addiction and teen pregnancy are topics treated with nonjudgmental empathy." James Bernard of Entertainment Weekly called the song "my own favorite", commenting "Lyte slips into a storytelling mode to convey the anguish of her peers who are grappling with AIDS, drug addiction, and the specter of the abortion clinic. Rather than tossing around empty rhetoric, Lyte takes us face-to-face with these people, forcing us to look into their eyes."

In a retrospective review, AllMusic's Alex Henderson also highlighted the song, describing it as "a poignant reflection on the destruction caused by crack cocaine". In a 2010 review, Quentin B. Huff of PopMatters commented on the song "In “Eyes Are the Soul”, MC Lyte turns the eyes into symbols of our collective humanity. There's a frailty in this symbolism, one that is echoed by the swelling synth backdrop and busy but light percussion." further highlighting its similarities to the TLC hit song "Waterfalls".

In the book Stare in the Darkness: The Limits of Hip-hop and Black Politics (2011), political scientist Lester Spence commented on the song:

"MC Lyte firmly places the responsibility for their condition on their own shoulders. The HIV–AIDS victim contracted the disease because he was irresponsible and did not know the woman with whom he was both sleeping and sharing needles. The crack addict is addicted because his mother was an addict. The final instance?

'I've watched her grow, little girl down the street White shirts and skirts with pleats/She cried, fear in her voice/Not knowing, she had a choice'

In each case, Lyte evinces sympathy and warmth toward the victim. By depicting the girl as she was when she was a child, Lyte depicts her as a young innocent and, in so doing, evokes sympathy from the listener. However, even in her sympathy, she frames the issue as one of individual knowledge. If the girl knew more, just as if the HIV–AIDS victim had better control, she wouldn't be in the situation she's in. There is no consideration of larger structural forces that shape access to material resources or even of the knowledge that Lyte suggests is the solution."

== Single track listing ==
=== 12" Vinyl ===
==== A-Side ====
1. "Eyes Are the Soul" (Soul Remix) (4:10)
2. "Eyes Are the Soul" (Jazzy Soul Remix) (5:24)

==== B-Side ====
1. "Eyes Are the Soul" (LP Version) (3:53)
2. "Eyes Are the Soul" (Soul Remix Instrumental) (4:10)

=== Cassette Maxi-Single ===
==== A-Side ====
1. "Eyes Are the Soul" (Soul Remix) (4:10)
2. "Eyes Are the Soul" (Jazzy Soul Remix) (5:24)

==== B-Side ====
1. "Eyes Are the Soul" (LP Version) (3:53)
2. "Eyes Are the Soul" (Soul Remix Instrumental) (4:10)

== Personnel ==
Credits are taken from the liner notes.

- Lyrics By – MC Lyte
- Mixed By – Carman Rizzo
- Music By – Bret Mazur, Richard Wolf
- Producer – Wolf & Epic

== Charts ==
Chart (1992)	Peak position
US Hot R&B/Hip-Hop Songs (Billboard)	84
