= Badder Than B-Fore =

Remix album by MC Lyte
- Released: November 10, 1997
- Recorded: 1996–1997
- Genre: Hip hop
- Length: 53:57
- Label: EastWest Records
- Producer: MC Lyte, Nat Robinson, Mousse T., The Hitmen

MC Lyte chronology
Bad as I Wanna B (1996)	Badder Than B-Fore (1997)	Seven & Seven (1998)

Professional ratings
Review scores
Source	Rating
AllMusic	2.5/5 stars

Badder Than B-Fore: The Remix Album is a remix album released by MC Lyte. The album featured remixed tracks from her 1996 album, Bad As I Wanna B, as well as two additional tracks that did not appear on the album.

== Track listing ==
1. "Cold Rock a Party" (Mousse T. Mix)
2. "Everyday" (Smoothed Over Remix)
3. "TRG (The Rap Game)" (Superfly Remix)
4. "One On One" (Master Tee Remix)
5. "Drug lord Superstar" (MILK. Remix)
6. "Have U Ever" (Brooklyn Remix)
7. "Keep On, Keepin' On" (JD Remix)
8. "Two Seater" (The Conductor's Club Remix)
9. "Zodiac" (The Deep Sign Remix)
10. "Cold Rock a Party" (Bad Boy Remix)
11. "Anthology Mega Mix"
12. "Two Seater" (Flavour Remix)
13. "I'm Leavin' U (Gotta Go, Gotta Go)" [C & J Full-time Mix]
