= When in Love =

1991 single by MC Lyte

Single by MC Lyte

from the album Act Like You Know
- B-side: "When In Love (Instrumental)"
- Released: August 22, 1991
- Genre: Golden age hip hop; New Jack Swing
- Length: 5:15
- Label: First Priority, Atlantic Records
- Songwriter(s): Lana Moorer, Epic Mazur, Richard Wolf
- Producer(s): Wolf & Epic (original LP version), Carmen Rizzo (single remix)

MC Lyte singles chronology
"Cappucino" (1990)	"When in Love" (1991)	"Poor Georgie" (1991)

Music video
- "When in Love" on YouTube

When in Love is the first single from MC Lyte's third album Act Like You Know. It was released on August 22, 1991. Although its original version of the album is produced by Wolf & Epic, its single version includes a remix made with Carmen Rizzo.

The song presents a style more oriented to the New Jack Swing sound.

In November 1991, the song peaked No. 14 on the Billboard's Hot R&B Singles, where it remained for 13 weeks, being her most successful song on that list to that date. Also peaking at No. 3 on the Billboard Hot Rap Singles.

== Conception and composition ==
According to Lyte in an Atlantic press release, the song is about "the stupid things people do when they're in love," describing situations like "I'm talkin like pickin your lover's nose/Cooking his food and washing his clothes/And if you thought that was goin too far/What about givin him the keys to your car?"

During an interview with Vibe in 2011 Lyte reflected on her music video: "When I was dancing in my video for ‘When In Love,’ I was just ready to try something different. I wasn't really concerned about any backlash. I did what I wanted to do."

=== Samples ===
The original version of the album contains an interpolation of Bill Withers's "The Same Love That Made Me Laugh" in his chorus. Carmen Rizzo's remix with Wolf & Epic, which was used in the music video, is built around a sample of James Brown 's "Hot (I Need to Be Loved, Loved, Loved)".

== Appearances ==
"When in Love" was included in her compilation albums The Very Best of MC Lyte (2001), Rhyme Masters (2005), and Cold Rock a Party - Best Of MC Lyte (2019). Her music video was included on her compilation video album Lyte Years (1991).

In the fall of 1991 she performed the song at the Pay-per-view TV concert Sisters In The Name of Rap. In February 1992 Lyte performed the song on the dance and music show Soul Train.

== Critical reception ==
Gil Griffin of The Washington Post highlighted the song in his album review for his way of approaching obsessive love.

In hindsight, Damon Brown of RapReviews would criticize the song, commenting that "is too convoluted, especially when compared to Rakim’s “Mahogany” or even Ghostface Killah’s recent “Love Sessions."

In the book Icons of Hip Hop: An Encyclopedia of the Movement, Music, and Culture (2007), the writer Jennifer R. Young would comment on the song:

"(When in Love) works as one of MC Lyte’s love anthems. Reminiscent of a piece that Aretha Franklin might have composed, an R&B soprano songstress emphasizes the word crazy in the refrain of the song. Crazy seems to serve as a euphemism for those who are strung out (or who have been strung out) on love. The song shows regular people doing regular things. Perhaps this is why Lyte has been referred to as a "Hip-Hop Zora Neale Hurston". Like Hurston, Lyte celebrates black folk for what they are while revealing the beauty and absurdity of their lives. In the widely read novel "Their Eyes Were Watching God", readers discover how the protagonist Janie endures many relationships before discovering true self-love and love for another man. Lyte’s "When in Love" challenges listeners to redirect their energy, to invest time in themselves and those who truly love them, notsimply those who find them attractive."

== Single track listing ==
=== 12" Vinyl ===
==== A-Side ====
1. "When In Love" (Remix) (5:15)
2. "When In Love" (Acapella) (3:50)

==== B-Side ====
1. "When In Love" (Instrumental) (4:02)

=== Cassette ===
==== A-Side ====
- "When In Love" (Remix Edit)
- "When In Love" (Remix)

==== B-Side ====
- "When In Love" (Remix Edit)
- "When In Love" (Remix)

== Personnel ==
Credits are taken from the liner notes.

- Lyrics By – MC Lyte
- Mastered By – Chris Gehringer (cg☮)
- Mixed By – Carmen Rizzo
- Music By – Bret Mazur, Richard Wolf
- Producer – Wolf & Epic
- Scratches – DJ K-Rock, DJ Master Tee

== Charts ==
Chart (1991–92)	Peak position
US Hot R&B/Hip-Hop Songs (Billboard)	14
US Hot Rap Songs (Billboard)	3
