= Ruffneck (song) =

1993 single by MC Lyte

Single by MC Lyte

from the album Ain't No Other
- B-side: "Brooklyn"
- Released: May 27, 1993
- Recorded: 1992
- Genre: East Coast hip hop; hardcore rap; new jack swing
- Length: 3:57
- Label: First Priority Music; Atlantic Street
- Songwriters: Lana Moorer; Aqil Davidson; Markell Riley; Walter Scott
- Producers: Wreckx-n-Effect; Walter "Mucho" Scott

MC Lyte singles chronology
"Ice Cream Dream" (1992)	"Ruffneck" (1993)	"I Go On" (1993)

Cover in cassette format

Music video
- "Ruffneck" on YouTube

"Ruffneck" is a hip hop song recorded by American rapper MC Lyte. It was published on May 27, 1993 by First Priority Music and Atlantic Street, as the lead single from her fourth studio album, Ain't No Other (1993). The song was produced by Aqil Davidson (of Wreckx-n-Effect) with Walter "Mucho" Scott, who along with Lyte have songwriting credits.

The song peaked at No. 35 on the US Billboard Hot 100 in October 1993 and the third No. 1 single on the Billboard Hot Rap Songs chart of her career. It also reached No. 40 on the US Cash Box Top 100 and No. 67 on the UK Singles Chart. On November 30, 1993 "Ruffneck" became the first work by a female solo rapper to be certified gold by the RIAA. The accompanying music video was directed by Pamela Birkhead and filmed on Long Island, New York.

With the single Lyte also received her first Grammy Award nomination for Best Rap Solo Performance at the 36th Grammy Awards in February 1994, but lost to Dr. Dre's "Let Me Ride". In 2011, it was included on XXL's "250 Greatest Hip-Hop Songs of the 90s" list. In April 2013, the song was included No. 17 on Complex's "The 50 Best Rap Songs by Women" list. "Ruffneck" was listed in the Rock Song Index: The 7500 Most Important Songs for the Rock and Roll Era (2005) by Bruce Pollock.

== Conception and composition ==
The song contains a much more aggressive style than its previous singles. In Ruffneck, which has been described as an "ode to thug love", MC Lyte explicitly talks about her sexual preference for men who have an "evil smile with a mouth full of gold teeth", "dude with a attitude" who'll "smack it, lick it, swallow it up style."

As Lyte told Vibe magazine in 2011, the song came about after then-Atlantic vice president Sylvia Rhone sent it to Virginia to work with Teddy Riley and his production team, who already had tracks ready for her.

"We were just sitting around talking and they played the 'Ruffneck' track. And we were thinking, "Okay, what can make an impact?" Someone brought up Apache’s "Gangsta Bitch". I thought it would be dope to give an ode to the ruffneck in the hood."

Regarding her use of the expression "ruffneck" she commented "I started talking about having something that gives tribute to West Indians because I grew up around that culture. And ruffneck happened to be a term that was used in West Indian culture. It was the feel that New York was going through." Years later Lyte was asked what happened to the girl who wanted a ruffneck, to which she replied "She’s older now. She still wants a ruffneck, but a ruffneck that’s a little more into the same things I’m into. Back then, I was still finding my way and was just someone who was willing to grow. So I’m not looking for the same ruffneck that I was looking back for then."

In April 2020, on the 19th anniversary of the passing of TLC's Left Eye Lopes, Lyte has confessed that she originally had an appearance in the second verse "She flew down in the middle of her tour to Virginia to hit the studio with Aquil Davidson, Teddy Riley and ME", but that it could not be finalized because it was not approved by her label.

=== Samples ===
The song is made up of multiple elements from James Brown's "The Payback". It also has an interpolation to "If It Ain't Rough, It Ain't Right" by Pete Rock & C.L. Smooth.

== Commercial performance ==
Although at the time of its publication "Ruffneck" divided its fans, it ended up becoming a crossover success. It became Lyte's second song on the US Billboard Hot 100 after Poor Georgie and her first top 40 single, peaking at #35 in October 1993 and staying a total of 20 weeks on the chart. It also became her first top 10 single on the Billboard's Hot R&B Singles, peaking at #10 in September of the same year, and her third song to reach #1 on the Hot Rap Songs charts. It also peaked at #67 on the UK Singles Chart, marking MC Lyte's first appearance on a chart outside of the United States as a lead artist. On the UK Dance Singles Chart, the song fared even better, reaching #22.

On November 30, 1993 "Ruffneck" became the first work by a female solo rapper to be certified gold by the RIAA, with 500,000 certified units (Previously only groups like Salt-N-Pepa and J. J. Fad had succeeded).

== Reception and influence ==
In his "Consumer Guide" column in The Village Voice, critic Robert Christgau described the song as "magnificent" and that "will break her pop if anything does, and I'm pessimistic enough about America and the 'hood to suspect that it's too good to do the trick." Described the "Ruffneck" chorus as "male cheering like the studio was a football terrace" and "strangely reminiscent of an oi anthem". Christgau also commented on the lyrics "he's always rude and not always what he pretends to be, but when she's got a problem: "He'll be there / Right by my side with his ruffneck tactics." I hope so. Because they're going to need each other." Pan-European magazine Music & Media wrote, "This female rapper scratches your neck roughly with a song on the same "shout-it-out-loud" level as Naughty by Nature's 'Hip Hop Hurray'." Simon Williams from NME said, "MC Lyte is making a healthy career out of rapping about shagging, with no come (sic) back. "I need a man who's quick to put out the spliff and get stiff!" she hollers alarmingly, rambling on about sucking and swallowing while the guys, somewhat unsurprisingly, go "HEY!" in the background. And this is a RADIO MIX??? If you can't beat 'em, f— 'em your way, I guess. A hit." Amy Linden from Vibe would write about the content of the song, "I don't think bitches ain't nuthin 'but hoes and tricks, and all respect due to Lyte, but this girl don't want a ruffneck' cause I just have this gut feeling that a guy who gets his kicks peeing on the street is not the male role model my son needs." During a note with Michel Marriott from New York Times, the playwright and screenwriter Richard Wesley reflected on the song that "the celebration of the ruffneck" represents "a paradox of identity, attitude and mannerisms of generations-long in black America." The Washington Times's Geoffrey Himes highlighted his "catchy Naughty by Nature-like cheerleader chorus."

In retrospect, AllMusic's Alex Henderson commented in his Ain't No Other album review that Ruffneck is "The song that did the most to define the album", describing it as a "catchy, inspired single". In 2001, Mark Anthony Neal of PopMatters opined that with the release of the single Lyte "introduces a moment in hip-hop where female acts like Salt-N-Pepa would reinscribe the value of "authentic" black masculinity/sexuality on tracks like 'Whatta Man' and 'Shoop'." In 2013, Complex's Lauren Nostro reviewed the song, which she deemed gave Lyte "her commercial peak five years after her Hall of Fame career", describing her beat as "syncopated head-nodding". and saying that his chorus is "ridiculously catchy". In September 2020, Vulture's Dee Lockett commented that with this song Lyte "set the standard for what women were "allowed" to rap about, and generations of New York rappers as Nicki Minaj, Cardi B, Foxy Brown and Lil' Kim followed her lead."

=== Accolades ===
Publication	Country	Accolade	Year	Rank
Bruce Pollock	U.S.	Rock Song Index: The 7500 Most Important Songs for the Rock and Roll Era	2005	*
Blender	U.S.	The 1001 Greatest Songs to Download Right Now!	2003	*
Complex	U.S.	The 50 Best Rap Songs by Women	2013	#17
Vulture	U.S.	The 100 Songs That Define New York Rap, Ranked	2020	#36
XXL	U.S.	250 Greatest Hip-Hop Songs of the 90s	2011	#173
(*) designates lists which are unordered.

== Music video ==
The music video for "Ruffneck" was directed by Pamela Birkhead, who also worked with Run-DMC and the progressive metal group Dream Theater, and was released in May 1993. Filmed on Long Island, it shows MC Lyte rapping with a group of men behind them cheering in the chorus and in a rooftop overlooking the Manhattan Bridge. It also features a cameo from former X Clan member Lin Que.

In July 2016, in her note Hip-Hop Music Videos From Women in the ‘90s That Still Give Us Life, VH1's Jasmine Grant commented:

"(...) who could hate on her honesty when it came to the men of her preference? The subject of sex was jarring coming from a female hip hop artist at the time, but the unforgettable element of this video was the delicious eye candy she served us. Lyte gave us various flavors of sexiness and style that were just quintessential 90’s hip hop, and in true MC Lyte fashion, so effortless."

== Appearances ==
"Ruffneck" was included in her compilation albums The Very Best of MC Lyte (2001), Rhyme Masters (2005), Rhino Hi-Five: MC Lyte (2007), Cold Rock a Party - Best Of MC Lyte (2019) and on the EastWest Maxi-Single "Lyte Of A Decade" (1996). MC Lyte performed this song in his tribute at the 2006 VH1 Hip Hop Honors. In October 2008 she performed "Ruffneck" at the BET Hip Hop Awards. "Ruffneck" was also featured on Electronic Art's 2005 video game NBA Street V3.

== Single track listing ==
=== A-Side ===
1. "Ruffneck" (12" Mix) – 5:22
2. "Ruffneck" (Dub Mix) – 5:25
3. "Ruffneck" (Instrumental) – 3:52

=== B-Side ===
1. "Brooklyn" (Radio Edit) – 4:05
2. "Brooklyn" (Dub Mix) – 4:05
3. "Brooklyn" (Instrumental) – 3:51

== Personnel ==
Credits are taken from the liner notes.

- Lyrics By – Lyte
- Producer, Lyrics By, Music By – Aqil Davidson (tracks: A1 to A3)
- Producer, Music By – Franklyn Grant (tracks: B1 to B3), Markel Riley, Tyrone Fyffe (tracks: B1 to B3), Walter "Mucho" Scott (tracks: A1 to A3)
- Engineer – Franklin Grant, Keston Wright
- Executive Producer – Nat Robinson

== Charts and certifications ==
=== Weekly charts ===
Chart (1993–94)	Peak position
UK Singles (OCC)	67
UK Dance (Music Week)	22
UK Club Chart (Music Week)	73
US Billboard Hot 100	35
US Hot Dance Singles Sales (Billboard)	10
US Hot R&B/Hip-Hop Songs (Billboard)	10
US Hot Rap Songs (Billboard)	1
US Rhythmic Airplay (Billboard)	25
US Cash Box Top 100	40

=== Year-end charts ===
Chart (1993)	Peak position
US Hot R&B/Hip-Hop Songs (Billboard)	51

=== Certifications ===
Region	Certification	Certified units/sales
United States (RIAA)	Gold	500,000^{^}
^{^} Shipments figures based on certification alone.

== See also ==
- List of Billboard number-one rap singles of the 1980s and 1990s
