= Wild child =

Wild child usually refers to a feral child; it may also refer to:

== Film and television ==
- The Wild Child, a 1970 French film directed by François Truffaut
- Wild Child (film), a 2008 teen comedy starring Emma Roberts
- "Wild Child" (Recess), a television episode
- "Wild Child: The Story of Feral Children", an episode of the documentary series Body Shock

== Books and comics ==
- Wild Child (book), 2021 children's nature book by Dara McAnulty
- Wild Child (character), a Marvel Comics character

== Music ==
- Wild Child (band), an American indie pop band
- Wildchild (rapper), an American rapper (born Jack Brown)

=== Albums ===
- Wild Child (E. G. Daily album), 1985
- Wild Child (Valerie Carter album), 1978
- Wild Child, by the Savage Rose, 1973
- Wild Child, by Tyler Bryant & The Shakedown, 2013
- Wild Child (The Untouchables album), 1985
- Wild Child, an EP by Zodiac Mindwarp and the Love Reaction, 1986
- Wildchild (album), by Alex Warren, 2026

=== Songs ===
- "Wild Child" (Ace Wilder song), 2017
- "Wild Child" (Elen Levon song), 2013
- "Wild Child" (Enya song), 2001
- "Wild Child" (Juliet Simms song), 2012
- "Wild Child" (Kenny Chesney and Grace Potter song), 2015
- "Wild Child" (Moumoon song), 2012
- "Wild Child" (The Ventures song), 1966
- "Wild Child" (W.A.S.P song), 1985
- "Wild Child", by the Black Keys from Dropout Boogie, 2022
- "Wild Child", by Carly Rae Jepsen from Day and Night, 2026
- "Wild Child", by Da Youngsta's from The Aftermath, 1993
- "Wild Child", by the Doors from The Soft Parade, 1969
- "Wild Child", by Hercules and Love Affair from Omnion, 2017
- "Wild Child", by Juliet Simms, 2012
- "Wild Child", by Kamaliya, 2017
- "Wild Child", by Lou Reed from Lou Reed, 1972
- "Wild Child", by Lupe Fiasco from Drogas Light, 2017
- "Wild Child", by Romeo's Daughter from Romeo's Daughter, 1988
- "Wild Child", by Scorpions from Pure Instinct, 1996

== People ==
- Wildchild (broadcast personality), IK Osakioduwa (born 1979), Nigerian radio and television host
- Wildchild (DJ), Roger McKenzie (1971–1995), English musician and DJ
- Wildchild (rapper), Jack Brown, American rapper
- Vincent Jackson (born 1983), American football wide receiver
- Alexi Laiho (1979–2020), Finnish metal guitarist
- Victor of Aveyron (1788 – 1828) aka Wild Child/Boy of Aveyron, a famous feral child

== See also ==
- Wild child, a general English term for a headstrong and rebellious young person
- Wild Kids, a Swedish reality show for children
