= I Can't Make a Mistake =

Single by MC Lyte

from the album Seven & Seven
- Released: September 21, 1998
- Studio: The Hit Factory, New York City
- Genre: Hip hop
- Length: 3:51
- Label: EastWest, Elektra
- Songwriters: Lana Moorer, Chad Hugo, Pharrell Williams
- Producer: The Neptunes

MC Lyte singles chronology
"Curious" (1997)	"I Can't Make a Mistake" (1998)	"It's All Yours" (1998)

"I Can't Make a Mistake" is a song by American rapper MC Lyte, released on September 21, 1998 via EastWest Records as first single from her sixth studio album, Seven & Seven. The track was produced by The Neptunes and written by Lyte herself, Pharrell Williams and Chad Hugo.

An uptempo club-oriented hip hop track, it features Lyte delivering verses about commanding the dancefloor and maintaining presence in a party setting. BET described it as a “1998 club banger where the hip hop vet spits verses about rocking the dance floor,” with production by Pharrell. Wilson & Alroy noted the Neptunes contributions on the album (including this song) as “several enjoyable numbers with what sound like live instruments.”

Despite not having been commercially released in the United States (only promotional 12-inch and CD singles were issued there), the single was commercially released in the United Kingdom, Germany and other European territories. It peaked at number 46 on the UK Singles Chart, number 20 on the UK Dance Chart and number 13 on the UK Hip Hop and R&B Singles Chart.

== Track listings ==
US promotional 12-inch single (EastWest ED 6092)

- A1. "I Can't Make a Mistake" (Album Version – Dirty) – 3:51
- A2. "I Can't Make a Mistake" (Album Version – Clean) – 3:51
- B1. "I Can't Make a Mistake" (Instrumental) – 3:51
- B2. "I Can't Make a Mistake" (Acappella) – 4:12

UK 12-inch single (Elektra E3813T)

- A. "I Can't Make a Mistake" (LP Version – Dirty) – 3:51
- B1. "I Can't Make a Mistake" (Instrumental) – 3:51
- B2. "I Can't Make a Mistake" (Acapella) – 4:12

German 12-inch single (EastWest America / First Priority 7559-63815-0)

- A1. "I Can't Make a Mistake" (Radio Version) – 3:51
- A2. "I Can't Make a Mistake" (Instrumental) – 3:51
- B1. "I Can't Make a Mistake" (Aroma Remix) – 5:28
- B2. "I Can't Make a Mistake" (Acappella) – 4:12

== Charts ==
Chart (1998)	Peak position
UK Singles (OCC)	46
UK Dance (OCC)	20
UK Hip Hop/R&B (OCC)	13

== Personnel ==
Credits adapted from Discogs and liner notes.

- MC Lyte – vocals, songwriter
- Marc Dorsey – backing vocals
- The Neptunes (Pharrell Williams, Chad Hugo) – producers, all instruments
- Chad Hugo – songwriter
- Pharrell Williams – songwriter
- Jason Goldstein – engineer
- Kevin Thomas – mixing
- Recorded and mixed at The Hit Factory, New York City
