= Cold Rock a Party =

1996 single by MC Lyte

Single by MC Lyte featuring Missy Elliott

from the album Bad As I Wanna B
- B-side: "Have U Ever"; "Paper Thin"
- Released: November 12, 1996
- Length: 4:17
- Label: EastWest
- Songwriters: Lana Moorer; Melissa Elliott; Nile Rodgers; Bernard Edwards
- Producers: Rashad "Ringo" Smith (original); Sean "Puffy" Combs (remix)

MC Lyte singles chronology
"Everyday" (1996)	"Cold Rock a Party" (1996)	"Druglord Superstar" (Milk remix) (1997)

Missy Elliott singles chronology
"You Don't Have to Worry" (1996)	"Cold Rock a Party" (1996)	"Can We" (1997)

"Cold Rock a Party" is the lead single released from American rapper MC Lyte's fifth studio album, Bad As I Wanna B (1996). While the original version of the song that appears on the album was produced by Rashad Smith and samples Audio Two's "Top Billin", the single version features Missy Elliott, was produced by Sean Combs, and samples Diana Ross' 1980 hit "Upside Down". It was released in November 1996 by EastWest Records.

The song became MC Lyte's second-highest-charting single in the United States (after her previous single "Keep On, Keepin' On"), peaking at No. 11 on the Billboard Hot 100, and it received a gold certification from the Recording Industry Association of America (RIAA), selling over 600,000 units by the end of 1997. It is MC Lyte's last single to appear on the Billboard Hot 100. "Cold Rock a Party" also became a hit in several other countries, including New Zealand, where it reached No. 1 for two weeks.

== Critical reception ==
Larry Flick from Billboard magazine described "Cold Rock a Party" as "a classic party rocker", noting that it is combining "Lyte's melodic flow" with the high-powered instrumental to "Upside Down". Peter Miro from Cash Box named it a "gem" of the Bad As I Wanna B album. A reviewer from Music Week gave the song a top score of five out of five, writing that the veteran female rapper "returns with a hip hop biggie", that is "already receiving big club and media exposure. A good bet for the charts." Also DJ Freshy-D from Smash Hits gave "Cold Rock a Party" five out of five, naming it "one of the most kickin' hip hop tracks since ooh, The Fugees' last one." He added that Lyte "adds a sassy girls' kick-ass vibe that makes the choon so wicked. 'All the laydees, all the laydees, all the laydees in the house say, HO!'"

== Track listings ==
- US CD single
1. "Cold Rock a Party" (Bad Boy remix—main version) – 4:37
2. "Cold Rock a Party" (Bad Boy remix—MC Lyte main version) – 4:37
3. "Cold Rock a Party" (original album version) – 4:17
4. "Have U Ever" (album version) – 3:33
5. "Cold Rock a Party" (Milk remix) – 3:19
6. "Paper Thin" (album version) – 5:14
- US cassette single
1. "Cold Rock a Party" (Bad Boy remix—clean radio edit) – 4:05
2. "Have U Ever" (LP version) – 3:33
- European cassette single
1. "Cold Rock a Party" (Bad Boy remix—clean radio edit) – 4:11
2. "Cold Rock a Party" (original version—clean) – 4:17
- European and Australian maxi-CD single
1. "Cold Rock a Party" (Bad Boy remix—clean radio edit) – 4:05
2. "Cold Rock a Party" (Bad Boy remix—main version) – 4:37
3. "Cold Rock a Party" (original version—clean) – 4:17
4. "Cold Rock a Party" (Milk remix) – 3:19
5. "Cold Rock a Party" (Bad Boy remix—a cappella) – 4:17

== Charts ==
=== Weekly charts ===
Chart (1996–1997)	Peak position
Belgium (Ultratip Bubbling Under Flanders)	12
Canada (Nielsen SoundScan)	11
Europe (Eurochart Hot 100)	38
Finland (Suomen virallinen lista)	12
France (SNEP)	33
Germany (GfK)	15
Iceland (Íslenski Listinn Topp 40)	15
Israel (Israeli Singles Chart)	27
Netherlands (Dutch Top 40)	33
Netherlands (Single Top 100)	36
New Zealand (Recorded Music NZ)	1
Scottish Singles Sales (Official Charts)	36
Sweden (Sverigetopplistan)	6
Switzerland (Schweizer Hitparade)	22
UK Singles (Official Charts)	15
UK Dance (Official Charts)	6
UK Hip Hop/R&B (Official Charts)	2
US Billboard Hot 100	11
US Dance Singles Sales (Billboard)	2
US Hot R&B/Hip-Hop Songs (Billboard)	5
US Hot Rap Songs (Billboard)	1
US Rhythmic Airplay (Billboard)	17

=== Year-end charts ===
Chart (1997)	Position
Germany (Media Control)	95
New Zealand (RIANZ)	6
Sweden (Topplistan)	93
US Billboard Hot 100	61
US Hot R&B Singles (Billboard)	34
US Hot Rap Singles (Billboard)	3
US Maxi-Singles Sales (Billboard)	16
US Rhythmic Top 40 (Billboard)	52

== Certifications ==
Region	Certification	Certified units/sales
New Zealand (RMNZ)	Platinum	10,000^{*}
United States (RIAA)	Gold	600,000
^{*} Sales figures based on certification alone.

== Release history ==
Region	Date	Format(s)	Label(s)	Ref(s).
United States	November 12, 1996	CD; cassette	EastWest	
United States	November 19, 1996	Rhythmic contemporary radio	EastWest	
United Kingdom	January 6, 1997	12-inch vinyl; CD; cassette	EastWest	
