= Wild Child (The Untouchables album) =

Studio album by the Untouchables
- Released: 1985
- Genre: Ska, reggae, R&B
- Label: Stiff/MCA
- Producer: Stewart Levine, Jerry Dammers

The Untouchables chronology
Live and Let Dance (1984)	Wild Child (1985)	Dance Party (1986)

Wild Child is the debut album by the American band the Untouchables, released in 1985. The first single was "Piece of Your Love". The band supported the album by opening for UB40 and then Sheila E. on North American tours. Wild Child peaked at No. 51 on the Official Albums Chart.

== Production ==
Most of the album was produced by Stewart Levine, in Amsterdam. The cover of Jamo Thomas's "I Spy (For the F.B.I.)" was produced in London by Jerry Dammers. The band had been playing most of the songs for years, although they wanted to move away from a mostly ska sound. The version of "Free Yourself" first appeared on the EP Live and Let Dance. "Lasershow" is an anti-war song. The title track is about a man worrying that his former girlfriend is overly enjoying her single life.

== Critical reception ==
Professional ratings
Review scores
Source	Rating
AllMusic	4.5/5 stars
The Philadelphia Inquirer	3/4 stars

The Gazette called the album "excellent ebullient music ... with roots deeper into reggae, ska, and that eclectic combination of the two perfected by the English Beat." The Sun Sentinel said that the band "goes Two-Tone one beat better, incorporating R&B and Stax-Volt influences, especially funky horns, into its reggae, ska and rock music." The Philadelphia Inquirer praised the "considerable vocal talents" of Chuck Askerneese. The Minneapolis Star and Tribune listed Wild Child as the fourteenth best album of 1985.

Reviewing a reissue, AllMusic said that "this '80s artifact is strong testimony to the band's musical worth and true influence and subsequent longevity." The Trouser Press Record Guide stated that "the sextet's enthusiasm and precision keep things rocking from start to finish."

== Track listing ==
No.	Title	Length
1.	"Wild Child"	4:53
2.	"I Spy (For the F.B.I.)"	3:26
3.	"Freak in the Streets"	4:11
4.	"What's Gone Wrong"	4:57
5.	"Free Yourself"
6.	"Piece of Your Love"
7.	"Soul Together"
8.	"Mandingo"
9.	"Lasershow"
10.	"Lovers Again"
11.	"City Gent"
