= The Untouchables (Los Angeles band) =

American soul and mod revival band

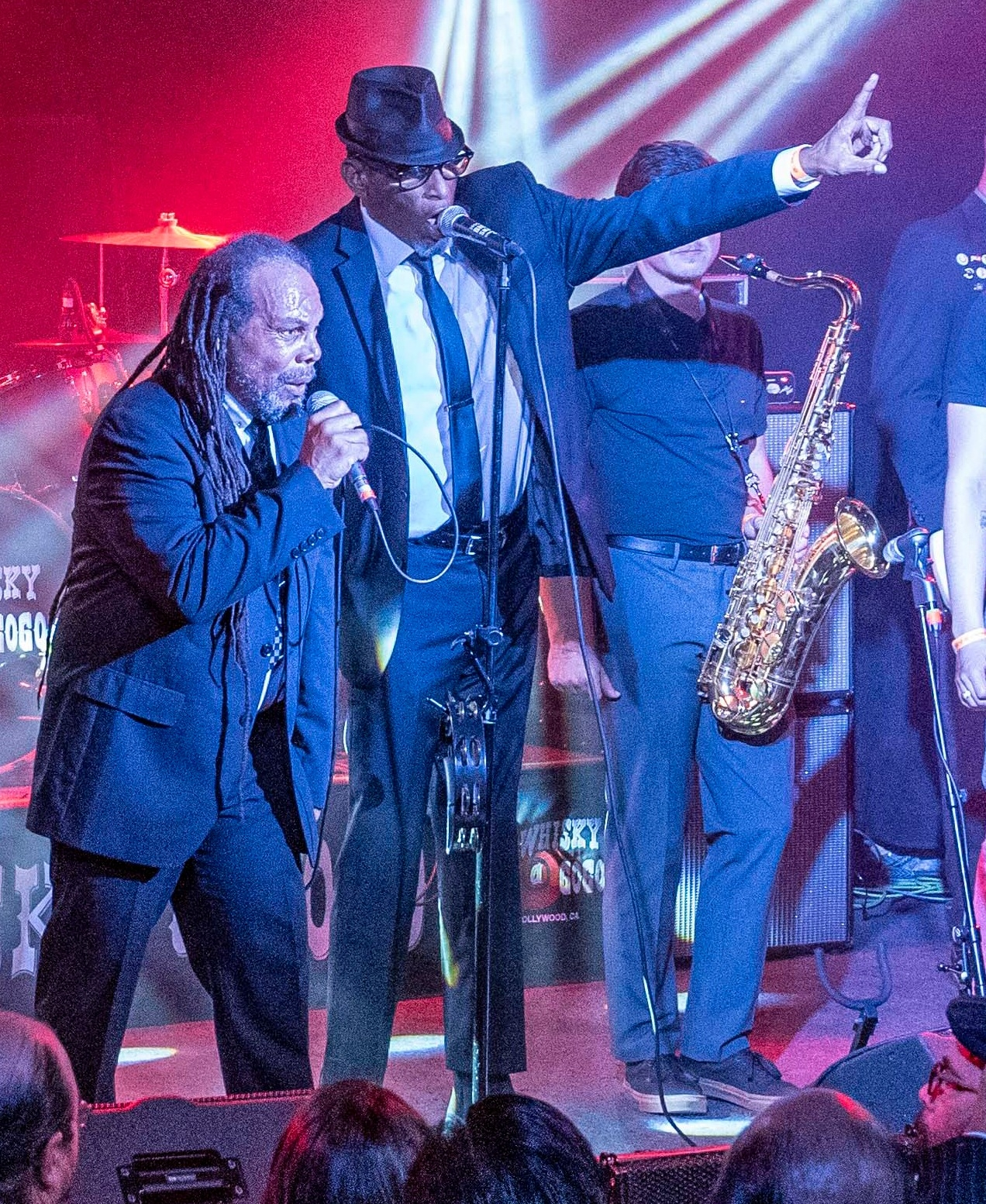
- Original members Chuck Askerneese (left) and Jerry Miller (right) performing at the Whisky a Go Go, January 2024 - Photo by Ron Batzdorff

Background information
- Also known as: The UTs
- Origin: Los Angeles, California, U.S.
- Genres: Soul, ska, mod revival
- Years active: 1981–present
- Labels: Stiff, MCA
- Members: Chuck Askerneese; Dave Cassell; Bubba Sanchez; Ryan Roberts; James Robertson; Jack Sneddon; Nick Ramos; William Overholtzer; Ian Beebe
- Past members: Clyde Grimes; Jerry Miller; Anthony Brewster; Dave Ramsey; Doug Sanborn; Danny Moynahan; Moises Casillas; Timothy Moynahan; Derek Breakfield; George Hughes; Herman Askerneese; Kevin Long; Rob Lampron; Glenn Symmonds; Caine Carruthers; Terry Ellsworth; David White; Will Donato; Kevin T Williams; Jeff Kashua; Mel Scott; Gabriel Gonzalez; Matt Fronke; Dave Blazer; Brian Wayy; Cedar Woods; Mark London Sims; Josh Harris; Jeffrey Govan

The Untouchables are a soul and mod revival band from the Silver Lake, Los Angeles, California, area. Described by original lead singer Kevin Long as "mods who played ska music," the Untouchables are credited with being America's first ska band.

== History ==
They formed in 1981 as part of the embryonic L.A. mod revival, after being inspired by the ska revival and punk rock band the Boxboys. Since some could not play instruments, they either hastily learned, or became vocalists. The original lineup included Kevin Long (vocals), Chuck Askerneese (vocals), Terry Ellsworth (rhythm guitar), Clyde Grimes (guitar), Rob Lampron (drums), Herman Askerneese (bass) and Jerry Miller (vocals, timbales).

After a shaky start playing at parties, the integrated septet were eventually booked at the O.N. Klub (known as the On to regulars). The band had guaranteed the club that they would pack the venue, and they did not disappoint. In middle of that year, they released their first (ska-styled) 7-inch single, copies of which were snapped up by local mods. Late in 1982, the band began a stint as the house band at the Roxy Theatre. Terry Ellsworth left the band in the summer of 1983, at the height of the California mod revival. Josh Harris was added on keyboards, Timothy Moynahan on trombone and Will Donato (who became a successful smooth jazz artist) started on sax.

Their second single, "The General", became a minor local hit, despite poor distribution. The band performed "The General" in the 1984 comedy The Party Animal, and they appeared as a scooter gang in the movie Repo Man. In early 1984, they were signed to Stiff Records. Concerts with the B-52's, Black Uhuru, Bow Wow Wow, Red Hot Chili Peppers, Fishbone, No Doubt, R.E.M. and X all over California gave the group a disparate following of whites, blacks, mods, Latinos, Asians, punks, surfers and rockabilly fans, with the local performances drawing up to 1,500 people. The band appeared in the 1984 film Surf II, performing "Dance Beat", and 1987's No Man's Land, performing "What's Gone Wrong", as well as the surf film Beyond Blazing Boards performing four tracks from their Wild Child album.

Their debut EP, Live and Let Dance (1984), is rated with four and a half stars (on a 0–5 scale) by AllMusic. Vocalist Kevin Long (who had named the band) left in 1984. Guitarist Clyde Grimes took on more vocal leads, and in 1984 the band recorded "Free Yourself", which became very popular, especially in the United Kingdom where it was a number 26 hit in April 1985. Their first full-length album, Wild Child (1985), also has a 4½ star rating in AllMusic. The band went through many lineup changes since then and in 2006 only vocalist Jerry Miller remained from the original lineup. Original vocalist Chuck Askerneese performs with the Untouchables as scheduling allows.

Original guitarist Clyde Grimes died on July 5, 2016. Vocalist Jerry Miller died on October 3, 2024.

== Discography ==
=== Singles ===
- "Twist n Shake" b/w "Dance Beat" (1982)
- "Tropical Bird" b/w "The General" (1983)
- Live and Let Dance EP (1984)
- Dance Party EP (1985) (compilation of remixes of earlier singles)
- "Free Yourself" (Stiff Records, 1985) (UK No. 26)
- "I Spy for the FBI" (1985) (UK No. 59)

=== Albums ===
- Wild Child (1985) (UK No. 51)
- Agent Double O Soul (1988)
- Decade of Dance (1991)
- Cool Beginnings – Rare & Unreleased 1981–1983 (1992)
- Ghetto Stout (2000)
- Free Yourself - Ska Hits (2015)
