= 1 of 1 (MC Lyte album) =

Studio album by MC Lyte
- Released: September 20, 2024
- Genre: Hip hop
- Length: 50:13
- Label: Sunni Gyrl; My Block; Vydia
- Producer: Warryn Campbell; DJ Scratch; Easy Mo Bee; King of Chill; Koncept; Cory Mo; Nottz

MC Lyte chronology
Cold Rock a Party: Best of MC Lyte (2019)	1 of 1 (2024)

Singles from 1 of 1
- 1. "Woman" Released: March 22, 2024; 2. "King King" Released: June 28, 2024; 3. "Thank You" Released: August 23, 2024; 4. "Make a Livin'" Released: October 4, 2024

1 of 1 is the ninth album released by American rapper MC Lyte. The album was released in 2024 via My Block Inc. and Sunni Gyrl Inc. in partnership with Vydia, and featured production from Warryn Campbell, Nottz, DJ Scratch, Easy Mo Bee, The King of Chill, Koncept and Cory Mo. It is MC Lyte's first studio album in 9 years after the release of Legend in 2015.

The album features collaborations with artists such as Stevie Wonder, Mary Mary, Queen Latifah, Ghostface Killah, Q-Tip, Common, Salt, Big Daddy Kane and Raheem DeVaughn.

== Track listing ==
1 of 1 track listing
No.	Title	Writer(s)	Producer(s)	Length
1.	"1 of 1 Intro"	Lana Moorer	Warryn Campbell	0:39
2.	"Thank You" (featuring Muni Long and Mary Mary)	L. Moorer; Erica Campbell; Tina Campbell; W. Campbell; Priscilla Hamilton; Dominick Lamb; Richard Smallwood	Nottz; W. Campbell^{[a]}	4:33
3.	"Life & Luxury" (featuring Eric Dawkins)	L. Moorer; Rogest Carstarphen; Eric Dawkins; Kenneth Moorer; Willie Williams	DJ Scratch; W. Campbell^{[a]}	4:40
4.	"King King" (with Queen Latifah)	L. Moorer; Joi Campbell; W. Campbell; Lamb; Dana Owens	Nottz; W. Campbell^{[a]}	3:18
5.	"Sunni Block Barber Shop" (featuring Affion Crockett)	Affion Crocket	W. Campbell	0:41
6.	"To RockThe Mic"	L. Moorer	W. Campbell	3:45
7.	"1–5"	L. Moorer	W. Campbell	2:40
8.	"Make a Livin'"	L. Moorer	W. Campbell	2:09
9.	"All Day All Night"	L. Moorer; W. Campbell	Easy Mo Bee	3:25
10.	"Lyte Ghost Lil Mama" (featuring Ghostface Killah and Lil Mama)	L. Moorer; Dennis Cole; Niatia Kirkland	King of Chill	4:08
11.	"Kick Back Relax" (featuring Q-Tip)	L. Moorer	W. Campbell	2:44
12.	"Vote 4 Change" (featuring Warryn Campbell and Zaya Campbell)	L. Moorer; W. Campbell; Zaya Campbell	W. Campbell	0:38
13.	"Change Your Ways" (featuring Stevie Wonder and Common)	L. Moorer; W. Campbell; Lonnie Lynn	Koncept	3:55
14.	"Woman" (with Raheem DeVaughn and Big Daddy Kane featuring Cheryl "Salt" James)	L. Moorer; Raheem DeVaughn; Antonio Hardy; Cheryl James	W. Campbell	3:30
15.	"Alright" (featuring Jai'Len Josey)	L. Moorer; Crocket; Jai'Len Josey	Cory Mo	3:44
16.	"Wisdom from Easy Mo Bee"	L. Moorer	W. Campbell	0:57
17.	"Music Is" (featuring JoiStaRR)	L. Moorer; J. Campbell	W. Campbell	4:41
Total length:				50:13

Note

- ^{^[a]} signifies an additional producer.

== Personnel ==
- Mark Santangelo – mastering
- Ryan DeRemer – mixing, engineering
