= Act Like You Know =

Studio album by MC Lyte
- Released: September 17, 1991
- Recorded: 1990–1991
- Studio: Firehouse (Brooklyn, NY); First Priority Labs (Staten Island, NY); Power Play (Long Island City, NY); Red Chamber (Sherman Oaks, CA); Skip Saylor Recording (Los Angeles, CA); Studio with a View (New York, NY)
- Genre: Golden age hip hop; new jack swing
- Length: 62:18
- Label: First Priority; Atlantic 91731
- Producer: The 45 King; Audio Two; Epic Mazur; Richard Wolf; the King of Chill; DJ Doc; Pal Joey; DJ Master Tee

MC Lyte chronology
Eyes on This (1989)	Act Like You Know (1991)	Ain't No Other (1993)

Singles from Act Like You Know
- 1. "When in Love" Released: August 22, 1991; 2. "Poor Georgie" Released: December 12, 1991; 3. "Eyes Are the Soul" Released: April 9, 1992

Act Like You Know is the third studio album by American hip hop recording artist MC Lyte. It was released on September 17, 1991, by First Priority Music, distributed by Atlantic Records, and featured production from Audio Two, the 45 King, Ivan "Doc" Rodriguez, the King of Chill, Pal Joey, Epic Mazur, Richard Wolf, and DJ Master Tee.

In this album she develops in some tracks a softer sound influenced by R&B, having more mixed reviews than in her previous albums. Commercially it performed weaker than its predecessor, Eyes on This, peaking at No. 102 on the Billboard 200 Top Albums and No. 14 on the Top R&B Albums.

Two singles made it high on the Hot Rap Singles chart with "When in Love" peaking at No. 3 and Poor Georgie reaching No. 1. "Poor Georgie" also cracked the Billboard Hot 100, peaking at No. 83 in March 1992.

== Recording and production ==
During an interview with Angie Martinez in 2019, Lyte said that during this time she "was ready to be sexy" but was prevented by an executive. Lyte revealed "I was reprimanded by my label exec like, 'No, you don't have to do that.' (...) When she saw the photo shoot she called me and she said, 'What is this? I need you to put your jeans on and I need you to take a photo shoot on the streets of New York.'"

Unlike her previous work, on this album Lyte features a more diverse production team, which includes her usual King of Chill and Audio Two adding to The 45 King of Queen Latifah's Flavor Unit, Ivan "Doc" Rodriguez, Wolf & Epic (who have previously worked with Seal, Sheena Easton, Bell Biv Devoe and Ralph Tresvant), among others. On some tracks the album also had a softer sound influenced by New Jack Swing and R&B. Regarding this Lyte commented in an interview to The New York Times "Oh, there are nutty people out there who want rappers to be this or that. I see rap melding into other types of music - reggae, house, R-and- B - to stay alive. After being underground for too long, you get ready to blow out. To me, the tracks still sound street, but they have something that adults could like, too. I'm the common denominator on all the tracks, and I tried to stay MC Lyte."

In an interview with Vibe in 2011 Lyte commented "First you come into the game and you have no expectations. You just want the microphone to say what you want to say. But before long the pressure is on to actually sell records. Once you have that pressure on you, you have to come up with new and inventive ways to get there."

On working with the Wolf & Epic production team, MC Lyte stated:

During that whole era, what was most constant in my mind was Bell Biv DeVoe's remixes(...) What I think it was, they were capturing what Puff Daddy was about to capture. As far as having hip-hop with dance. Or as far as having rap on top of a song that was R&B but still had very strong hip-hop influences to it. And when I heard that, I wondered how I could do this, how can I take it to where it needs to be. And at that point I sought for Wolf and Epic who had done the remixes for Bell Biv DeVoe.

== Music and lyrics ==
The album addresses topics such as sexuality ("Like a Virgin", "2 Young 4 What"), teenage pregnancy ("Eyes Are the Soul"), dysfunctional relationships ("Poor Georgie"), alcohol and drug addiction ("Poor Georgie", "Eyes Are the Soul") and AIDS ("Eyes Are the Soul", "Lola from the Copa"). She said about the album content "I'm talking about so many things, from drinking and driving, smoking causing cancer, losing virginity, abortion from a pro-choice stance, drug addiction, AIDS. I tried to pick topics and issues that hadn't been done to death by rappers. Then I tried to make it seem funny, to put the message in a palatable way."

In "Kamikaze" Lyte blasts rap that does not deal with real issues, singing: "They try to keep me down because I talk to a beat / In other words I try to teach / But if I talk that Yang Yang s—t / Like You Can't Touch This/That s—t'll hit." in reference to MC Hammer's hit song. On the album Lyte also covers "Take It Off" by Spoonie Gee (1986). In the CD version of the album "K-Rock's the Man" was included as a bonus track, which is performed by Lyte's disc jockey, DJ K-Rock.

== Critical reception ==
Professional ratings
Review scores
Source	Rating
AllMusic	3/5 stars
Robert Christgau	(3-star Honorable Mention)
Entertainment Weekly	A−
Orlando Sentinel	3/3 stars
(The New) Rolling Stone Album Guide	4/5 stars

In his "Consumer Guide" column in The Village Voice, critic Robert Christgau highlighted the songs "When in Love" and "All That". Writing for the magazine Details, Brantley Bardin declared that the album's "only real fault… is that with at least one message (if not six) per song, it verges on becoming the ultimate public service announcement." The magazine Sassy raved that the "record hits you with crazy hard beats, and Lyte's rhymes talk about life from a distinctly girly perspective," while Billboard lauded Act Like You Know as "a toughtalking effort that takes no prisoners," calling Lyte's style "tough but caring and, above all, smart." Joan Morgan from Spin commented "If you consider yourself a rap aficionado, let alone an MC Lyte fan, skip the first side of Act Like You Know, " also found the samples and arrangements of the album's first half overwrought. "It falls way off and lands squarely in pop-rap hell.… [Lyte's] voice has the eerie, anemic sound of a lost MC in a musical identity crisis." Even so, Morgan admitted, "She finds herself on the second side, thank God, and comes back kicking shit harder than ever over fat, simple drum beats and some seriously slamming samples."

Gil Griffin of The Washington Post wrote in his review of the album "Lyte proves she shines brightest among female rappers. Eighteen well-written songs, a mixture of deliveries, and fresh beats and samples give her a rough, tough and psychedelic symmetry." Although Griffin singled out socially conscious songs like Eyes Are the Soul, Poor Georgie, and When in Love, he would also comment that "When off the serious subjects, she's a devilishly funny and clever storyteller, and a ruthless competitor-slayer - especially when she goes after other rappers on Kamikaze." People critic Michael Small noted that, in trying to branch out into the R&B genre, Lyte was spreading herself too thin, and risked "pleasing no one." While she was talented in both genres, he wrote, maintaining her "consistent skills" and proving she's a "great storyteller," the departure put her in a "confusing middle ground." James Bernard of Entertainment Weekly rated the album an A−, saying "Hip-hop does not have to be hard; it can be sensitive and smooth, as this rap vet proves on her third effort. Act Like You Know finds MC Lyte softening her image without losing her edge." highlighting especially the socially conscious "Eyes Are the Soul" and the tracks on which "she gets in the trenches with a harder microphone attack" like "Search 4 the Lyte" and "All That."

In hindsight, Alex Henderson of AllMusic commented that even with a more commercial sound, the album "is far from a sellout - Lyte's music still has plenty of bite, substance, and integrity." He also considered that as in her previous album "she's at her best when telling some type of story instead of simply boasting about her rapping skills." In July 2016 it was included by The Boombox at No. 24 on their list "The 25 Greatest Rap Albums of 1991". In January 2019, Albumism's Jesse Ducker called the album "a small misstep" in Lyte's career.

== Track listing ==
The song writing information is according to the ASCAP website.

No.	Title	Writer(s)	Producer(s)	Length
1.	"When in Love"	Lana Moorer; Richard Wolf; Bret "Epic" Mazur	Wolf & Epic	3:58
2.	"Eyes Are the Soul"	Lana Moorer; Richard Wolf; Bret "Epic" Mazur	Wolf & Epic	3:53
3.	"Search 4 the Lyte"	Lana Moorer; Freddie Byrd	King of Chill	3:21
4.	"Act Like You Know"	Lana Moorer; Richard Wolf; Bret "Epic" Mazur	Wolf & Epic	3:50
5.	"Mickey Slipper (Interlude)"	Lana Moorer; Richard Wolf; Bret "Epic" Mazur	Wolf & Epic	1:36
6.	"Poor Georgie"	Lana Moorer; Ivan "Doc" Rodriguez; David Paich	DJ Doc	4:30
7.	"Take It Off"	Gabriel Jackson; Joseph Longo	Pal Joey	4:51
8.	"Beyond the Hype"	Lana Moorer; Richard Wolf; Bret "Epic" Mazur	Wolf & Epic	4:20
9.	"All That" (feat. Dana Eaves)	Lana Moorer; Dana Eaves; Nat Robinson; Kirk Robinson	Audio Two	3:10
10.	"Big Bad Sister"	Lana Moorer; Mark James	The 45 King	3:11
11.	"Like that Anna (Interlude)"	Lana Moorer; Kirk Robinson	Audio Two	0:53
12.	"Kamikaze"	Lana Moorer; Mark James	The 45 King	4:10
13.	"Can You Dig It"	Freddie Byrd	King Of Chill	3:15
14.	"Like a Virgin"	Lana Moorer; Mark James	The 45 King	4:13
15.	"Lola from the Copa"	Lana Moorer; Nat Robinson; Kirk Robinson	Audio Two	3:04
16.	"2 Young 4 What"	Lana Moorer; Ernie Isley; Marvin Isley; O'Kelly Isley Jr.; Ronald Isley; Christopher Jasper	DJ Master Tee	3:32
17.	"Absolutely Positively..... Practical Jokes"	Lana Moorer; Mark James	The 45 King	3:42
18.	"Another Dope Intro (Interlude)"	Lana Moorer; Richard Wolf; Bret "Epic" Mazur	Wolf & Epic	0:43
19.	"K-Rock's the Man" (CD only Bonus Track)	Kennith Moorer; David Minor; Kelly Barnett	Audio Two	2:05
Total length:				62:18

=== Samples ===
- "When In Love"
  - "Changin'" by Brass Construction
  - "Hot (I Need to be Love, Love Loved)" by James Brown
- "Search 4 the Lyte"
  - "Funky Drummer" by James Brown
  - "More Peas" by The J.B.'s
  - "Dazz" by Brick
- "Poor Georgie"
  - "Just Be Good To Me" by The S.O.S. Band
  - "Bubble Bunch" by Jimmy Spicer
  - "Georgy Porgy" by Toto
  - "My World Is Empty Without You" by The Supremes
  - "I Wanna Be Where You Are" by Michael Jackson
- "All That"
  - "Cozy" by Bar-Kays
  - "This Song Is Familiar" by Funkadelic
- "Big Bad Sister"
  - "Help Is on the Way" by The Whatnauts
- "Another Dope Intro"
  - "Synthetic Substitution" by Melvin Bliss
- "2 Young 4 What"
  - "Groove With You" by Isley Brothers

== Personnel ==
Credits are taken from the liner notes.

Performance

- Lead vocals – MC Lyte
- Lyrics By – MC Lyte, Pal Joey (track 7), Spoonie Gee (track 7), Dana Eaves [Additional] (track 9), The King Of Chill (track 13) DJ K-Rock (track 19), David Minor (track 19)
- Backing Vocals – Vanessa Townell (track 1) Myron Glasper (track 2) Torrence Woods (track 2) Billy Trudel (track 8)
- Bass – Reggie McBride (tracks: 1, 8)
- Drums – Bret Mazur (tracks: 1, 2, 4, 8)
- Acoustic Guitar – Jeff Baxter (track 2)
- Guitar – Richard Wolf (tracks: 1, 2, 8)
- Lead Guitar – Nick Kirgo (track 8)
- Keyboards – Richard Wolf (tracks: 1, 8)
- Saxophone – Bob Shepphard (track 2)
- Scratches [Produced By] – DJ K-Rock, DJ Master Tee

Production & Technical

- Mastered By – Carlton Batts
- Producer – Audio Two (tracks: 9, 11, 15, 19), Wolf & Epic (1, 2, 4, 5, 8, 18), The 45 King (10, 12, 14, 17), The King Of Chill (3, 13), DJ Doc (track 6), Pal Joey (track 7)
- Mixed By – Carmen Rizzo (tracks: 1, 2, 8) Ivan "Doc" Rodriguez (track 6) DJ Master Tee (10, 12, 16, 17)
- Music By – Audio Two (tracks: 9, 11, 15, 19), Wolf & Epic (1, 2, 4, 5, 8, 18), The 45 King (10, 12, 14, 17), The King Of Chill (3, 13), DJ Doc (track 6), Pal Joey (track 7)
- Engineer – Yoram Vazan (track 3) Ivan "Doc" Rodriguez (track 6) Dwayne D Sumal (track 7) Carmen Rizzo (track 8) Audio Two (9, 11, 15, 19) DJ Master Tee (tracks: 10, 17) The 45 King (12, 14) The King Of Chill (track 13)
- Engineer [Assistant] – Chris Fuhrman (tracks: 1, 2) Peter Jorge (track 7) Tracy Chisholm (track 8)
- Programmed By – Bret Mazur (tracks: 1, 2, 4, 8)
- Arranged By [Vocal Arrangement] – Richard Wolf (tracks: 1, 2, 8)

== Charts ==
=== Weekly charts ===
Chart (1991)	Peak position
US Billboard 200	102
US Top R&B/Hip-Hop Albums (Billboard)	14

=== Year-end charts ===
Chart (1992)	Position
US Top R&B/Hip-Hop Albums (Billboard)	66
