= Jamo Thomas =

American singer

- Born: James Thomas
- Genres: Northern soul, soul, funk
- Occupations: Singer, percussionist
- Instrument: Vocals
- Years active: Late 1950s–mid 1970s
- Labels: Conlo Records, Sound Stage 7, Thomas Records, Chess, Decca, Perception Records, SSS International

Jamo Thomas is an American soul and funk singer, best remembered for his 1966 hit single, "I Spy (For the FBI)".

Born in either The Bahamas or Chicago, he recorded for several different record labels between 1965 and 1976. His billing sometimes included his name alongside backing musicians, known as his Party Brothers Orchestra, or simply as Mr. Jamo. His biggest successes were "Bahama Mama" and a cover version of "I Spy (For the FBI)".

== Career ==
After a spell as a percussionist with the Pennsylvania-based Bobby Peterson Quintet in the late 1950s, Thomas relocated to Chicago in the early 1960s. He recorded his debut single, "Stop the Baby", in 1965 for the small Conlo Records label, with the track produced by Jerry Butler. Thomas was working for the singer at the time, as his valet and driver, while also playing percussion in his support band.

His next recording, "I Spy (For the FBI)", produced by Monk Higgins and Burgess Gardner and released on the small Thomas label (owned by Eddie Thomas), peaked at number 98 on the United States Billboard Hot 100 in 1966. It was re-issued on Polydor in the United Kingdom in 1969, when it reached number 44 in the UK Singles Chart. The track proved to be his only appearance in either chart. The song was written by Herman Kelley and Richard "Popcorn" Wylie, and was originally recorded by Luther Ingram a few months prior to Thomas' version.

Thomas later moved to Philadelphia and recorded for Perception Records. By 1972, he was acting in a promotional capacity for Stax Records. His recording career finished more or less in the mid-1970s, although Thomas was later credited as an arranger for an Ella Washington gospel album. He re-appeared in 1983 for a 12-inch outing on the small Emerald International label called "(My Jive) Backstabbing Friend". His scream was used on the opening of the track "Scream" on Graham Central Station's 1979 Warner Bros. album, Star Walk.

His work has appeared on various compilation albums over the years, including Spy Magazine Presents: Spy Music, Vol. 1 (1994), Chess Club Rhythm & Soul (1996) and Shake What You Brought! SSS Soul Collection (2005).

In addition to the Ingram and Thomas versions of "I Spy (For the FBI)", the song has been recorded by The Untouchables, Blue Rondo à la Turk and John Hiatt.

== Discography ==
- "Stop the Baby" b/w "Let's Party" (Conlo Records) (1965)
- "I Spy (For the FBI)" b/w "Snake Hip Mama" (Thomas Records) (1966)
- "Arrest Me" b/w "Jamo Soul" (Thomas Records) (1966)
- "Must I Holler" b/w "I'll Be Your Fool" (Chess) (1966)
- "Nassau Daddy" b/w "Jive Mother-in-Law" (Sound Stage 7) (1967)
- "Bahama Mama (Part 1)" b/w "Bahama Mama (Part 2)" (Sound Stage 7) (1967)
- "Education Is Where It's At (Part 1)" b/w "Education Is Where It's At (Part 2)" (Decca) (1968)
- "Shake What You Brought With You (Part 1)" b/w "Shake What You Brought With You (Part 2)" (Perception) (1970)
- "You Just Ain't Ready (Part 1)" b/w "You Just Ain't Ready (Part 2)" (SSS International) (1970)
