= I Go On =

1993 single by MC Lyte

- Side A of the US 12-inch vinyl

Single by MC Lyte

from the album Ain't No Other
- B-side: "Ruffneck (Beatnut Remix)"
- Released: November 4, 1993
- Genre: Hip hop
- Length: 4:47
- Label: First Priority Music; Atlantic Street
- Songwriters: Lana Moorer; Aqil Davidson; Tyrone Fyffe; Franklin Grant
- Producers: Markell Riley; Tyrone Fyffe; Franklin Grant

MC Lyte singles chronology
"Ruffneck" (1993)	"I Go On" (1993)	"Keep On Keepin' On" (1996)

Cover in cassette format

Music video
- "I Go On" on YouTube

"I Go On" is the second and final single from MC Lyte's fourth album Ain't No Other. Produced by Tyrone Fyffe, Franklin Grant and Wreckx-n-Effect's Markell Riley, it was released on November 4, 1993.

As in her previous single, the lyrics focus on talking about her sexuality although now as part of a smooth production.

"I Go On" peaked at No. 68 on the Billboard's Hot R&B Singles in January 1994. It did not chart on the Billboard Hot 100, but peaked at No. 16 on the Bubbling Under Hot 100 extension chart. This would be the last work of Lyte published under First Priority Music, since it would later sign with East West Records.

== Content ==
The song has a softer production than the hardcore sound that predominates on the album. In it, Lyte talks about casually having sex with men whom she later "refuse to call 'em back", in addition to responding to those who are upset about it "It ain't worth it for the moment or the minute/You was in it then you want it but, no, now ya done, kid." In the third verse it seeks to convey a message anti-violence against women "I only here for the righten night/To be hit not smack not slapped or kicked/So if you coming my way you gotta be strong/Strong enough to know that hitting a woman is wrong."

In a review from May 2017, the website dedicated to hip hop music The Boombox considered I Go On as "the best examples of Lyte flipping the gender script."

=== Samples ===
The song contains a riff sample from "Been So Long" by Anita Baker and the hook is based on interpolations from "La Di Da Di" by Doug E. Fresh and Slick Rick, in which Lyte says "I go on and on and on and on/Let it flow, ya don't stop" in reference to the lines "And on and on and on" and "To the tick tock ya don't stop". Also included in the single version of the song is a remix by Walter "Mucho" Scott titled "I Go on (Gangsta Mix)", which in turn samples the riff of "Young, Gifted and Black" by Aretha Franklin.

== Single track listing ==
=== 12" Vinyl ===
==== A-Side ====
1. "I Go On" (LP Version) (4:47)
2. "I Go On" (Midnight Mix) (4:05)
  - Produced by Chris Smith
3. "I Go On" (Midnightstrumental) (7:20)
  - Produced by Chris Smith

==== B-Side ====
1. "I Go On" (Gangsta Mix) (5:15)
  - Produced by Walter "Mucho" Scott
2. "I Go On" (Accapella) (4:53)
3. "Ruffneck" (Beatnut Remix) (3:26)
  - Remixed by The Beatnuts

=== Cassette ===
==== A-Side ====
1. "I Go On" (LP Version) (4:47)
2. "I Go On" (Midnight Mix) (4:05)
  - Produced by Chris Smith and Teddy Riley

==== B-Side ====
1. "I Go On" (LP Version) (4:47)
2. "I Go On" (Midnight Mix) (4:05)
  - Produced by Chris Smith and Teddy Riley

=== Cassette Maxi-Single ===
==== A-Side ====
1. "I Go On" (LP Version) (4:47)
2. "I Go On" (Midnight Mix) (4:05)
  - Produced by Chris Smith
3. "I Go On" (Midnightstrumental) (7:20)
  - Produced by Chris Smith

==== B-Side ====
1. "I Go On" (Gangsta Mix) (5:15)
  - Produced by Walter "Mucho" Scott
2. "I Go On" (Accapella) (4:53)
3. "Ruffneck" (Beatnut Remix) (3:26)
  - Remixed by The Beatnuts

== Personnel ==
Credits are taken from the liner notes.

- Lyrics By – Lyte
- Producer, Engineer, Music By – Franklyn Grant
- Producer, Music By – Markell Riley, Tyrone Fyffe
- Engineer [Additional] – George Mayers, John Haynes
- Mastered By – Amelia Moore, Jose Rodriguez
- Executive Producer – Nat Robinson

== Charts ==
Chart (1993–1994)	Peak position
US Bubbling Under Hot 100 (Billboard)	16
US Hot Dance Singles Sales (Billboard)	38
US Hot R&B/Hip-Hop Songs (Billboard)	68
US Hot Rap Songs (Billboard)	27
