= Lester Spence =

American political scientist

- Born: Lester Kenyatta Spence; Detroit, Michigan
- Education: University of Michigan, Ann Arbor (BA, PhD)
- Awards: Kellogg Scholar of Health Disparities (2004-2006)
- Scientific career
- Fields: Political Science
- Workplaces: Washington University in St. Louis; Johns Hopkins University
- Thesis: Strings of Life, Gender and Political Participation in Detroit (2001)
- Doctoral advisor: Hanes_Walton_Jr.
- Website: lesterspence.com

Lester K. Spence (born June 5, 1969), Professor of Political Science and Africana studies at Johns Hopkins University is known for his academic critiques of neoliberalism and his media commentary and research on race, urban politics, and police violence. Previously, he was an Assistant Professor of Political Science at Washington University in St. Louis. Spence's writings on race and politics appear regularly in publications such as Jacobin, The Chronicle of Higher Education, Dissent NPR, New York Times, Baltimore City Paper, among others. Spence also appeared regularly on C-SPAN, The Marc Steiner Show, among others.

Raised in Inkster, Spence holds both a BA and a PhD in Political Science from the University of Michigan. He has lived in Baltimore since 2004 and is a father of five. He is a member of Omega Psi Phi having pledged at the University of Michigan's Phi chapter.

== Publications ==
- Spence, Lester. Knocking the Hustle: Against the Neoliberal Turn in Black Politics. Punctum Books, 2016.
- Spence, Lester. "Race, Class, and the Neoliberal Scourge." Tikkun 28, no. 4 (2013): 29–31.
- Spence, Lester K. "Race and The Green Mile." Contours of African American Politics: Black Politics and the Dynamics of Social Change 2 (2012): 281.
- Spence, Lester, and Mike McGuire. "Occupy and the 99%." We are Many: Reflection of Movement Strategy From Occupation to Liberation AK Press (2012): 53–65.
- Spence, Lester K. Stare in the darkness: The limits of hip-hop and Black politics. U of Minnesota Press, 2011.
- Spence, Lester K., and Harwood McClerking. "Context, black empowerment, and African American political participation." American Politics Research 38, no. 5 (2010): 909–930.
- Spence, Lester K. "Episodic frames, HIV/AIDS, and African American public opinion." Political Research Quarterly 63, no. 2 (2010): 257–268.
- Spence, Lester K., Harwood K. McClerking, and Robert Brown. "Revisiting black incorporation and local political participation." Urban Affairs Review (2009).
- Spence, Lester. "The Deaths Could Have Been Prevented." Space and Culture 9, no. 1 (2006): 5–6.
