= I Can't Make a Mistake =

Song by American rapper MC Lyte

"I Can't Make a Mistake" is a song by American rapper MC Lyte, released in 1998 as a single from her sixth studio album Seven & Seven. It was produced by "The Neptunes" and written by MC Lyte (Lana Moorer), Chad Hugo, and Pharrell Williams

The track is an uptempo hip-hop song oriented toward the club and dancefloor. BET described it as a “1998 club banger where the hip hop vet spits verses about rocking the dance floor,” with production by Pharrell. Wilson & Alroy called the Neptunes contributions on the album (including this song) “several enjoyable numbers with what sound like live instruments.” Apple Music noted it among the earliest examples of the production style The Neptunes would later popularize.

Despite not having been commercially released in the United States (only promotional 12-inch and CD singles were issued there), the single was released commercially in the United Kingdom, Germany, and other European territories on EastWest/Elektra and related imprints. It peaked at number 46 on the UK Singles Chart, number 20 on the UK Dance Chart, and number 13 on the UK Hip Hop/R&B Chart.
