= Ain't No Other =

Studio album by MC Lyte
- Released: June 22, 1993
- Recorded: 1992–1993
- Studios: Future Recording Studios (Virginia Beach, VA); First Priority Labs (Staten Island, NY); Power Play Studios (Long Island City, NY); Chung King Studios (New York, NY); Battery Studios (New York, NY); AT Large Studios
- Genre: Hip-hop
- Length: 60:08
- Labels: First Priority; Atlantic
- Producers: Audio Two; Backspin; Wreckx-N-Effect; Franklin Grant; Tyrone Fyffe; "Lil" Chris Smith; John "Funk" Alexander; K-Cut; Sir Scratch; Walter "Mucho" Scott

MC Lyte chronology
| Act Like You Know (1991) | Ain't No Other (1993) | Bad As I Wanna B (1996) |

Singles from Ain't No Other
- 1. "Ruffneck" Released: May 27, 1993; 2. "I Go On" Released: November 4, 1993

Professional ratings
Review scores
| Source | Rating |
|---|---|
| AllMusic | 3/5 stars |
| Robert Christgau | A− |
| Los Angeles Times | 3/4 stars |
| NME | 5/10 |
| Rolling Stone | 3.5/5 stars |
| The Village Voice | (favorable) |

Ain't No Other is the fourth album released by American rapper MC Lyte. It was released on June 22, 1993, on First Priority Music/Atlantic Records and produced by Audio Two, Backspin, Markell Riley, Franklin Grant, Tyrone Fyffe, "Lil" Chris Smith, Funk, Sir Scratch and Walter "Mucho" Scott.

Ain't No Other peaked at No. 90 on the Billboard 200 and No. 16 on the Top R&B Albums chart, selling 238,000 copies in United States according to Nielsen Soundscan (2007).

Also produced two charting singles "I Go On", which peaked at No. 27 on the Hot Rap Singles chart, and the more successful "Ruffneck", which reached No. 1 on the Hot Rap Singles chart and peaked at No. 35 on the Billboard Hot 100.

== Track listing ==
1. "Intro" – 0:19
2. "Brooklyn" (Lana Moorer, Tyrone Fyffe, Franklin Grant, Markell Riley) – 4:03
3. "Ruffneck" (Lana Moorer, Aqil Davidson, Markell Riley, Walter Scott) – 3:57
4. "What's My Name Yo" (Lana Moorer, Kevin McKenzie, Scott McKenzie) – 3:38
5. "Lil Paul" (Lana Moorer, Funk) – 3:27
6. "Ain't No Other" (Lana Moorer, Backspin) – 3:36
7. "Hard Copy" (Linque Ayoung, Backspin) featuring Lin Que and Makeba Mooncycle (Kink Ez) – 2:30
8. "Fuck That Motherfucking Bullshit" (Lana Moorer, Vaughn Alford, Kirk Robinson) – 3:17
9. "Intro" – 0:05
10. "I Go On" (Lana Moorer, Aquil Davidson, Franklin Grant, Markell Riley) – 4:47
11. "One Nine Nine Three" (Lana Moorer, Backspin) – 3:27
12. "Never Heard Nothin' Like This" (Kirk Robinson) – 3:06
13. "Can I Get Some Dap" (Lana Moorer, Backspin) – 3:34
14. "Let Me Adem" (Lana Moorer, Backspin) – 3:22
15. "Steady Fucking" (featuring KRS-One) (Lana Moorer, Kirk Robinson, Nat Robinson, Lawrence Parker, Scott Sterling) – 5:08
16. "Who's House" – 4:50
17. "I Cram to Understand U" – 7:04

== Personnel ==
- Nat Robinson – executive producer
- Herb Powers, Jr. – mastering
- Merlyn Rosenberg – photography
- Lynn Kowalewski – art direction

== Charts ==
| Chart (1993) | Peak position |
|---|---|
| US Billboard 200 | 90 |
| US Top R&B/Hip-Hop Albums (Billboard) | 16 |

=== Year-end charts ===
| Chart (1993) | Position |
|---|---|
| US Top R&B/Hip-Hop Albums (Billboard) | 68 |
