= Mellowman =

- Origin: France
- Genres: French hip hop
- Years active: 1994 - 2004
- Labels: East West France
- Past members: Lee Rick; DJ Cool (†)

Mellowman is a French hip hop act active during the 1990s, composed of two members, Lee Rick (Rapper) & DJ Cool (Producer). The band achieved moderate success in 1995 with its first single, then a bigger success with its second one in France : "Gardez l'écoute" (#46), and "La Voix du Mellow" (#13 in France and 16 weeks in the top 50, #17 in Belgium Wallonia). In 1998, DJ Cool died in a car accident, leaving Lee Rick alone in the group. The rapper Ménélik paid a tribute to the DJ in his clip " Bye Bye " with a message at the end of the video: " to the memory of Jean-Luc Crimée (Cool DJ) ". The band also recorded a duet with SKO in 1999, entitled "Un Autre Jour", that featured as B-side on the hit single "Just Another Day", ranked in several charts at the time. Among band's other songs, there were "Pyromellow" and "Respire".

== Discography ==
=== Albums ===
- La Voie du Mellow
1. "Ainsi Soit Cool"
2. "Pyromellow"
3. "Le Temps De Vivre"
4. "Funky Chaperon Rouge"
5. "La Voie Du Mellow"
6. "Did Et Tom"
7. "Gardez L'Écoute"
8. "Ainsi Soit Cool (Cool Bis)"
9. "Check-List"
10. "Mésaventures"
11. "Salsa"
12. "Mic Mac"
13. "Ainsi Va La Vie"
14. "Week End"
15. "Gardez L'Écoute (Swing Beats Mix)"
16. "La Voie Du Mellow (Pumba Family Mix)"
17. "Week-End (Take Gsp Time Mix)"
18. "Le Temps De Vivre (Happy Pumba Mix)"
- Au Jour le Jour
1. "Ouverture"
2. "Hipoptimist"
3. "Respire"
4. "Cette fille me casse..."
5. "C'est c'que j'fais"
6. "Des gens souffrent"
7. "That's Phunk" (interlude 1)
8. "Fais tourner"
9. "Porte disparu"
10. "Dédicace"
11. "Faut qu'ça roule"
12. "Un pour tous"
13. "Video Rodeo"
14. "Abus d'anges heureux"
15. "1 - Terre - Lune" (interlude 2)
16. "Let'S Get Funk"

=== Singles ===
- "Gardez l'écoute" - #46 in France
- "La Voie du Mellow" - #13 in France, #17 in Belgium (Wallonia)
- "Pyromellow" (1995)
- "Le Temps 2 Vivre"
- "Respire" (1998)
- "Let's get funk" feat. MC Lyte (1997)
