= Legend (MC Lyte album) =

Studio album by MC Lyte
- Released: April 18, 2015
- Recorded: 2013–2014
- Genre: Hip hop
- Length: 36:47
- Labels: Sunni Gyrl Inc.; Omnivore Recordings
- Producers: Dominique Ludarius Cohill, Emmanuel A. Jimenez, Emmanuel Wells II, Loudbox & Olson Kenneth Wells II

MC Lyte chronology
Almost September (2008)	Legend (2015)	Cold Rock a Party: Best of MC Lyte (2019)

Singles from Legend
- 1. "Cravin'" Released: June 7, 2013; 2. "Dear John" Released: September 10, 2014; 3. "Ball" Released: November 13, 2014; 4. "Check" Released: April 10, 2015

Legend is the eighth album released by American rapper MC Lyte. The album was released in 2015 via Omnivore Recordings and Sunni Gyrl Inc., and featured production from Dominique Ludarius Cohill, Emmanuel A. Jimenez, Emmanuel Wells II, Loudbox and Olson Kenneth Wells II.

The album features collaborations with artists such as Coko, Common, Faith Evans, Kenny Lattimore, Lil Mama and Stan Carrizosa.

As part of Record Store Day (April 18), the album was available for 24 hours only as a limited-edition vinyl collector's item.

== Background ==
Although in 2008 Lyte had released an EP as part of the group Almost September, Legend was her first solo studio album since Da Undaground Heat, Vol. 1, released 12 years earlier. The album features collaborations with artists such as Coko from SWV, Common, Faith Evans, Kenny Lattimore, Lil Mama and Stan Carrizosa, the winner of the reality TV show High School Musical: Get in the Picture.

In a Rolling Out interview, Lyte would comment on the "Legend" production "I think it’s very timely in terms of the production. I was able to add a new and true style. New because we have songs like “Check” and “We Here Now,” that sort of encompass the sound that is so popular today. We were also able to capture what I call the true sound, which is organic instrumentation, things that people are accustomed to hearing my songs like “Dear John” and “Last Time.” Those are the songs that are able to capture that sound. It’s just true to my style, I may not be addressing a specific topic song by song, but I am telling you who I am. I am standing for what it is I believe, and hopefully, I’m able to talk to my fans and also to the newcomers to hip-hop and show them a glimpse of who MC Lyte is." Some songs were produced by Loudbox Entertainment, of whom Lyte commented: "Eighty percent of them come from a church background, so they play all instruments. They really have a sense of music, which I really enjoy."

When asked by The Source about her motivation to record an album, Lyte responded:

"I listen to quite a few heads in Hip Hop. Kendrick Lamar, Kanye West, Drake and a bunch of others. I love Hip Hop and I love artist pushing the limits. Now if only they can add the love and understand how powerful their words are and how they have the capacity to uplift communities all over the world."

== Release and promotion ==
On June 7, 2013, the single "Cravin'" was released in digital format, in which Lyte collaborates with singer Stan Carrizosa. This song was later included on the album. In October of the same year, she and Carrizosa performed the song at The Arsenio Hall Show.

In September 2014 the second single "Dear John" was released. The track, which features Common and 10Beats, is an open letter to men. The single appeared on the real-time US Billboard + Twitter Trending 140, where it peaked No. 3. On October 14, 2014, MC Lyte performed "Dear John" in front of President Barack Obama, at the celebration of the 50th anniversary of the legislation that created the National Endowment for the Humanities and the National Endowment for the Arts.

A few months later the third single, "Ball", was released. The song, which features rapper Lil Mama and singer AV, was performed on the Fox talk show The Real. Ball also has had a music video directed by Ron Yuan, who previously had also directed the video for "Cravin'".

In April 2015, shortly before the album's release, the fourth and final single "Check" was released. The song also has a music video, which also serves as a lyrical visual, combining some footage from Lyte's live presentations. As part of Record Store Day (April 18), the album was available for 24 hours only on a limited-edition vinyl collector's item. The promotion was to support independent record stores nationwide.

== Track listing ==
The information are taken from the liner notes and the official page of the ASCAP.

No.	Title	Writer(s)	Producer(s)	Length
1.	"We Here Now" (featuring Mario)			2:48
2.	"Ball" (featuring Lil Mama & AV)	Lana Moorer; Niatia Kirkland; Dominique Cohill; José Guzmán; Emmanuel Jiménez; Ronald Ndlovu; Olson K. Wells II; Douglas Williams	José Guzmán; Emmanuel Jiménez; Olson K. Wells II; Douglas Williams	2:30
3.	"Bomb Wild Out" (featuring AV)			3:47
4.	"Dear John" (featuring Common & 10Beats)	Lana Moorer; Lonnie Lynn; Dominique Cohill; Ronald Ndlovu	Loudbox	3:20
5.	"Last Time" (featuring Coko & Faith Evans)			3:42
6.	"Wanted"			3:18
7.	"Cravin'" (featuring Stan Carrizosa)	Lana Moorer; Stanley Carrizosa; Michael Bearden; Dominique Cohill; José Guzmán; Emmanuel Jiménez; Ronald Ndlovu; Olson K. Wells II; James Driscoll	Loudbox/The Natives	3:35
8.	"40 Days" (featuring StayC Reign)			3:25
9.	"Way Back"			3:34
10.	"Check"	Lana Moorer; Dominique Cohill; Emmanuel Jiménez; Ronald Ndlovu; Olson K. Wells II	Dominique Cohill; Emmanuel Jiménez; Emmanuel Wells II; Olson K. Wells II	3:14
11.	"Love on Me" (featuring Kenny Lattimore)			3:54
Total length:				36:47

== Personnel ==
Production

- Dominique Ludarius Cohill
- Emmanuel A. Jimenez
- Emmanuel Wells II
- Loudbox
- Olson Kenneth Wells II
- The Natives
- José Guzmán
- Douglas Williams
