= Bad as I Wanna B =

Studio album by MC Lyte
- Released: August 27, 1996
- Recorded: 1995–1996
- Genre: Hip hop
- Length: 39:54
- Label: East West America; Elektra
- Producer: Jermaine Dupri; Rashad Smith; Carl-So-Lowe; R. Kelly; Goldenboy (K-Cut); Darrell "Delite" Allamby

MC Lyte chronology
Ain't No Other (1993)	Bad as I Wanna B (1996)	Badder Than B-Fore (1997)

Singles from Bad As I Wanna B
- 1. "Keep On Keepin' On" Released: March 13, 1996; 2. "Everyday" Released: August 6, 1996; 3. "Cold Rock a Party" Released: November 12, 1996

Professional ratings
Review scores
Source	Rating
AllMusic	2.5/5 stars
Cash Box	(favorable)
Robert Christgau	(2-star Honorable Mention)
The New Rolling Stone Album Guide	3/5 stars
Rolling Stone	4/5 stars

Bad as I Wanna B is the fifth album released by American rapper MC Lyte. It was released on August 27, 1996, for EastWest Records and was produced by Jermaine Dupri, Rashad Smith, Carl-So-Lowe, R. Kelly, Goldenboy (K-Cut), MC Lyte and Nat Robinson.

Bad as I Wanna B peaked at No. 59 on the Billboard 200, the MC Lyte's highest position on this chart, and No. 11 on the Top R&B Albums chart. In Germany, the album reached No. 95 on the Offizielle Top 100, becoming MC Lyte's first studio album to chart outside of the United States.

The album featured two charting singles, "Keep On, Keepin' On," which reached No. 10 on the Billboard Hot 100 and No. 27 on the UK Singles Chart, and "Cold Rock a Party," which reached No. 11 on the Billboard Hot 100 and No. 15 on the UK Singles Chart. Both singles were certified Gold by the RIAA.

== Track listing ==
1. "Keep On, Keepin' On"- 4:32 (Featuring Xscape)
2. "Have U Ever"- 3:33
3. "Everyday"- 3:45
4. "Cold Rock a Party"- 4:17
5. "TRG (The Rap Game)"- 4:03
6. "One on One"- 3:46
7. "Zodiac"- 2:45
8. "Druglord Superstar"- 4:02
9. "Keep on Keepin' On" (Remix)- 4:57
10. "Two Seater"- 4:09

== Charts ==
Chart (1996)	Peak position
German Albums (Offizielle Top 100)	95
US Billboard 200	59
US Top R&B/Hip-Hop Albums (Billboard)	11
