= Everyday (MC Lyte song) =

1996 single by MC Lyte

Single by MC Lyte

from the album Bad as I Wanna B
- B-side: "Everyday" (Remix)
- Released: August 6, 1996
- Genre: East Coast hip hop
- Length: 3:35
- Label: EastWest America (US), Atlantic Records (UK and Europe)
- Songwriter(s): Lana Moorer; Jermaine Dupri; Prince Rogers Nelson
- Producer(s): Jermaine Dupri, Carl So-Lowe

MC Lyte singles chronology
"Keep On Keepin' On" (1996)	"Everyday" (1996)	"Cold Rock a Party" (1996)

Music video
- "Everyday" on YouTube

"Everyday" is a song by American rapper MC Lyte, released on August 6, 1996 via EastWest Records, as the second single from her fifth studio album, Bad as I Wanna B. The track was produced by Jermaine Dupri and co-produced by Carl So-Lowe, with backing vocals by Xscape's Kandi Burruss. This single is based on a sample of "The Walk" by the funk rock group The Time, for which Prince, the composer of that song, is also credited on "Everyday".

Blending hip-hop and R&B influences, it showcases MC Lyte’s assertive lyrical style, addressing themes of self-respect and high expectations in relationships. "Everyday" is Lyte's third release as lead artist to chart on the UK Singles Charts, peaking at No. 81. Despite not having been commercially released in the United States, it peaked No. 44 on the Billboard R&B/Hip-Hop Airplay and No. 40 on the Billboard Mainstream R&B/Hip-Hop Airplay.

== Critical reception ==
"Everyday", along with "TRG (The Rap Game)", were the tracks highlighted in Robert Christgau's review of Bad as I Wanna B. In retrospect, Elms College library director Anthony J. Fonseca reviewed "Everyday" in his book Listen to Rap!: Exploring a Musical Genre. In his review, Fonseca considered the song's instrumental "similar" to that of Lyte's previous single "Keep On Keepin' On", although noted the "addition of a 1980s keyboard voice that gives a neo soul feel." He also highlighted MC Lyte's "clever" pauses when a "surprise detail is dropped on her list of chores." Wilson & Alroy, referring to "Everyday" and "Keep On Keepin' On", found to MC Lyte in Bad as I Wanna B "lyrical and unsentimental on the love songs." In 2016, The Boombox Preezy Brown included the song among the best tracks on Bad as I Wanna B, describing it as "a funky, albeit smooth, number" and "the album's most addictive selections. He would also say that Everyday is "still remembered by die-hard Lyte fans as one of her most slept-on tracks."

== Track listings ==
- UK/European 21' vinyl maxi-single
1. "Everyday" (radio version) – 3:44
2. "Everyday" (LP version) – 3:43
3. "Everyday" (remix) – 3:48
4. "Everyday" (instrumental) – 3:44
5. "Everyday" (accapella) – 3:32
- European cassette single
1. "Everyday" (Radio Version - Clean) – 3:44
2. "Everyday" (Remix Radio Version - Clean) – 4:43
- European maxi-CD single
1. "Everyday" (Radio Version - Clean) – 3:44
2. "Everyday" (Remix) – 3:48
3. "Everyday" (Accapella) – 3:32
4. "Everyday" (Instrumental) – 3:44
5. "Everyday" (Remix Radio Version - Clean) – 3:46

== Charts ==
Chart (1996)	Peak position
UK Singles (OCC)	81
UK Dance (OCC)	37
UK Hip Hop/R&B (OCC)	11
US R&B/Hip-Hop Airplay (Billboard)	44
