= Dear John (MC Lyte song) =

2014 single by MC Lyte, Common and 10Beats

Single by MC Lyte featuring Common & 10Beats

from the album Legend
- Released: September 10, 2014
- Genre: Conscious Rap
- Length: 3:20
- Label: Sunni Gyrl Inc.
- Songwriters: Lana Moorer; Lonnie Lynn; Dominique Cohill; Ronald Ndlovu
- Producer: Loudbox

MC Lyte singles chronology
"This Is Your Life" (2014)	"Dear John" (2014)	"Ball" (2014)

Music video
- "Dear John" on YouTube

"Dear John" is a single by MC Lyte featuring Common & 10Beats from her subsequent eighth solo album Legend.

The song seeks to give a positive message about maintaining a father-son relationship and also serves as the official anthem of #EducateOURMen, the scholarship arm of the MC Lyte foundation's Hip Hop Sisters Network. It chart on the real-time US Billboard + Twitter Trending 140, where it peaked No. 3, being Lyte's first solo work to appear on a chart since her album Da Undaground Heat, Vol. 1.

== Content ==
The track is an open letter to men, asking, "You wanna be ballas, shot-callers, dippin 'in the Benz straight lawless?/Or, would you rather be fathers to your daughters, even though it's getting harder?".

== Release and promotion ==
The song had a music video featuring a collection of photos ranging from dads spending time with their children, to images of black community pillars like Cornel West, W. E. B. Du Bois, Harry Belafonte, Bill Cosby, Arthur Ashe, B.B. King, Martin Luther King Jr., Malcolm X, Russell Simmons, and Jackie Robinson. In October 14, 2014, MC Lyte performed Dear John to President Barack Obama in the celebration of the 50th anniversary of the legislation that created the National Endowment for the Humanities and the National Endowment for the Arts.

== Charts ==
Chart (2014)	Peak position
US Billboard + Twitter Trending 140 (Billboard)	3
