= Poor Georgie =

1991 single by MC Lyte

- cover of the U.S. cassette single

Single by MC Lyte

from the album Act Like You Know
- B-side: "Search 4 The Lyte"
- Released: December 12, 1991
- Genre: Golden age hip-hop
- Length: 4:30
- Label: First Priority, Atlantic Records
- Songwriters: Lana Moorer, Ivan Antonio Rodriguez, David Paich
- Producer: DJ Doc

MC Lyte singles chronology
"When in Love" (1991)	"Poor Georgie" (1991)	"Eyes Are the Soul" (1992)

Cover in cassette format
- Side A of the US 12-inch vinyl

Music video
- "Poor Georgie" on YouTube

"Poor Georgie" is the second single from hip-hop artist MC Lyte's third album Act Like You Know (1991). The song was produced by Ivan 'Doc' Rodriguez, and released on December 12, 1991. The song seeks to convey an anti-addiction message, through the story of George and the dysfunctional relationship MC Lyte has with this individual with self-destructive behaviors. It features a sample of "Georgy Porgy" by rock band Toto.

"Poor Georgie" become Lyte's first appearance on the Billboard Hot 100, peaking at No. 83 in March 1992. It also reached No. 11 on the Billboard Hot R&B Singles chart, and became her second chart topping single on the Hot Rap Singles chart. The accompanying music video featured an appearance by a then 16-year-old Lauryn Hill.

== Conception and composition ==
During an interview with Vibe in 2011 Lyte stated on the composition of the song:

“‘Poor Georgie’ was straight up storytelling. I just put every possible bad thing that could happen to someone in one song [laughs]. That was in itself humorous. With that song, I just wanted to paint a picture and have it hit people on all fronts. So if you don’t drink, well what about if you smoke? You don’t smoke, what about if you drink? This is what you stand to face if you do harmful things to your body.”

During another interview in 2013 she says:

“So there are times with songs like “Poor Georgie” that when I heard it, it made me feel like oh my god this is a story about a man who has some deep problems and deep issues(...) To a large degree I knew I needed to talk about drugs and the effect it had on people. In Brooklyn there were weed smokers, dope dealers and people dying. In Harlem, where I would spend my weekends, there was heroin and you’d see people nodding out in the middle of the damn street. You would see people with holes in their arms or their legs because they couldn’t find anymore veins to put something into. In Queens there was crack and in Harlem as well. I just knew my mission would be to try to educate my generation about the usage of drugs, selling it or being the drug dealer’s girlfriend and you wind up shot or in jail because of it. So I did make a conscious effort of that at a very young age.”

The song was produced by Ivan 'Doc' Rodríguez, who had previously worked remixed other songs by MC Lyte, including Cappucino.

The music video for "Poor Georgie" was released in September 1991 and features an appearance by 16-year-old Lauryn Hill.

=== Samples ===
The song contains multi-element samples from Toto's "Georgy Porgy", vocals from The Supremes' "My World Is Empty Without You", Michael Jackson's "I Wanna Be Where You Are", Jimmy Spicer's "The Bubble Bunch" hook. The song also samples the drums from Eric B. & Rakim's "Eric B. Is President". Additionally, MC Lyte interpolates "Just Be Good to Me" from the S.O.S. Band, from the second verse ("I don't care about the other girls, just be good to me!").

== Appearances ==
"Poor Georgie" was included the compilation albums The Very Best of MC Lyte (2001), The Shit I Never Dropped (2003), Rhyme Masters (2005), Rhino Hi-Five: MC Lyte (2007), and Cold Rock a Party - Best Of MC Lyte (2019).

In February 1992, Lyte performed the song on the dance and music show Soul Train. In May 1992, she performed the song on In Living Color.

== Reception and influence ==
Gil Griffin of The Washington Post highlighted the song in the album review, commenting that it "brilliantly incorporates an old Toto sample." In 1999, Ego Trip's editors ranked "Poor Georgie" at No. 22 in their list of Hip Hop's 40 Greatest Singles by Year 1991 in Ego Trip's Book of Rap Lists. In April 2015, the song was ranked No. 3 on VH1's list "The 25 Dopest Female Rap Tracks Of The Last 25 Years", noting that "Lyte’s cautionary tale of drunk driving once again proved that you could make folks dance and think at the same damn time."

In a conversation about her influences, Grammy-nominated rapper Rapsody mentioned Poor Georgie as "the first song that made me wanna be a part of it."

=== Accolades ===
Publication	Country	Accolade	Year	Rank
Ego Trip	U.S.	Hip Hop's Greatest Singles by Year 1980–1998	1999	22
The Boombox	U.S.	20 Classic Hip-Hop Summer Love Song	2018	18
uDiscoverMusic	U.S.	Best Hip-Hop Love Songs: 25 Tracks For 808s And Soulmates	2021	23
VH1	U.S.	The 25 Dopest Female Rap Tracks Of The Last 25 Years	2015	3
(*) designates lists which are unordered.

== Single track listing ==
=== 7" Vinyl ===
==== A-Side ====
1. "Poor Georgie" (4:10)
  - Music By – DJ Doc

==== B-Side ====
1. "Search 4 The Lyte" (3:21)
  - Music By – King Of Chill

=== 12" Vinyl ===
==== A-Side ====
1. "Poor Georgie (LP Version)" (4:30)
2. "Poor Georgie (Instrumental)" (4:30)

==== B-Side ====
1. "Search 4 The Lyte (LP Version)" (3:21)
2. "Search 4 The Lyte (Instrumental)" (3:21)

=== Cassette ===
==== A-1 ====
1. "Poor Georgie (Edit)" (4:05)

==== A-2 ====
1. "Search 4 The Lyte (LP Version)" (3:21)

== Personnel ==
Credits are taken from the liner notes.

- Engineer – Ivan "Doc" Rodriguez (tracks: A1, A2), Yorum Vazan (tracks: B1, B2)
- Lyrics By – MC Lyte
- Producer – King Of Chill (tracks: B1, B2)
- Producer, Mixed By – Dee Jay Doc (tracks: A1, A2)

== Charts ==
Chart (1991–92)	Peak position
US Billboard Hot 100	83
US Hot R&B/Hip-Hop Songs (Billboard)	11
US Hot Rap Songs (Billboard)	1

== See also ==
- List of Billboard number-one rap singles of the 1980s and 1990s
