= Richard Wolf (composer) =

American film and television composer

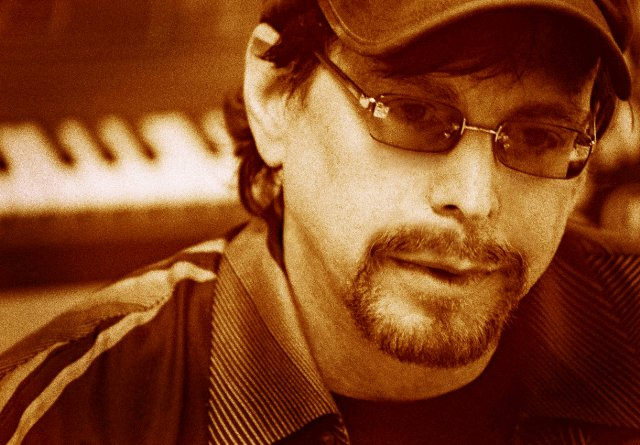

Background information
- Born: United States
- Genres: Film score, Hip hop
- Occupations: Composer, music producer, songwriter, remixer, author

Richard "Wolfie" Wolf is an American Emmy Award-winning film and television composer, multi-platinum-selling music producer, songwriter, remixer, and author.

Wolf began his career as a singer/songwriter before becoming a staff writer for Warner/Chappell Music. He later worked in film music and record production prior to focusing on television and film composition. Since 2015, he has been a faculty member at the University of Southern California Thornton School of Music.

== Early life and career ==
Wolf was born in Manhattan, New York. While still a college freshman, he signed his first recording agreement with Quinn Ivy Studios in Muscle Shoals, Alabama, where he worked with the studio guitarist and co-writer Wayne Perkins. He subsequently became a staff songwriter at Warner/Chappell Music, where his compositions were recorded by artists including Steve Cropper, Angela Bofill, Johnny Gill, and Toni Basil.

== Record production ==
In 1989, Wolf formed the production team Wolf & Epic with Bret "Epic" Mazur. The duo has been described as one of the notable production teams emerging from the early 1990s Los Angeles hip hop and R&B crossover scene. Their early work included Laquan's Notes of a Native Son, which incorporated live instrumentation with hip hop production techniques.

Wolf & Epic contributed to Bell Biv DeVoe's certified multi-platinum Poison (1990) and its remix counterpart WBBD-Bootcity!, which was certified gold. The album has been described in retrospective critical coverage as helping to blur the boundaries between hip hop and R&B.

Among Wolf's additional production and remix credits are collaborations with MC Lyte, Coolio, New Edition, Freddie Mercury, and Prince.

== Film and television ==
Wolf began working in film in the mid-1980s, contributing music to Back to School, The Karate Kid Part II, and Madonna's Who's That Girl. His later film work includes Presumed Innocent, Robocop (2014) and Three Kings.

He composed the score for the Warner Bros. animated series Static Shock (2000–2004), which Mix Magazine described as "hip hop and electronic elements with orchestral scoring". The work received Daytime Emmy nominations in 2003 and 2004 and won in 2004.

Wolf has also composed music for television including work used in NCIS, America's Next Top Model, and Fox Sports beginning in 1999.

== Academics and writing ==
Wolf joined the faculty of the University of Southern California Thornton School of Music in 2015. His teaching focuses on music in media and the relationship between musical practice and mindfulness.

He is the author of In Tune: Music as the Bridge to Mindfulness (2019), which examines connections between musical training and mindfulness practices. The book was discussed in The New Yorker.

== Personal life ==
Wolf serves as a board member of the I Have a Dream Foundation, where he oversees a program that brings music and mindfulness education to underserved schools.

== Discography ==
Year	Album	Artist	Role
2016	Messenger of the Gods: The Singles	Freddie Mercury	Additional Production, Mixing
2005	Donde Quiera Que Estes [2005]	The Barrio Boyzz	Arranger, Composer, Producer
2002	20th Century Masters - The Millennium Collection: The Best of Bell Biv DeVoe	Bell Biv DeVoe	Composer, Producer
2001	Soulblitz All Stars	Coolio	Composer, Producer
2001	Spirit of Funk		Composer, Producer
2001	The Very Best of MC Lyte	MC Lyte	Composer, Producer
2000	The Best of Bell Biv DeVoe	Bell Biv DeVoe	Composer, Producer
2000	The Best of the Barrio Boyzz	The Barrio Boyzz	Composer, Producer
1997	12 Super Exitos	The Barrio Boyzz	Composer, Producer
1994	12 Exitos Quemantes, Vol. 2		Composer, Producer
1994	Face the Music	New Kids on the Block	Producer, Composer
1994	Thought 'Ya Knew	CeCe Peniston	Composer, Drum Programming, Guitar, Keyboards, Producer
1993	Hootie Mack	Bell Biv DeVoe	Arranger, Composer, Engineer, Guitar, Keyboards, Vocal Arrangement, Vocals (Background)
1992	Crazy Coolin'	The Barrio Boyzz	Composer, Keyboards, Producer, Vocal Arrangement
1992	Eyes Are the Soul	MC Lyte	Composer, Producer
1992	Love for the Future	Nona Gaye	Composer, Guitar, Keyboards, Piano
1992	Return of the Product	MC Serch	Composer, Producer, Songwriter
1992	The Great Pretender	Freddie Mercury	Producer
1991	Act Like You Know	MC Lyte	Composer, Guitar, Keyboards, Producer, Vocal Arrangement
1991	Crazy	Seal	Remixing
1991	Horny Pony	Prince	Additional production, Remixing
1991	Lyte Years	MC Lyte	Composer, Producer
1991	Strictly Business		Producer, Songwriter
1991	WBBD-Bootcity! The Remix Album	Bell Biv DeVoe	Arranger, Composer, Guitar, Keyboards
1991	Wake Up the Party	The Don	Composer, Guitar, Keyboards, Producer
1991	What Comes Naturally	Sheena Easton	Arranger, Composer, Guitar, Keyboards, Vocal Arrangement, Vocals (Background)
1990	Notes of a Native Son	Laquan	Composer, Guitar, Keyboards, Organ, Vibraphone
1990	Poison	Bell Biv DeVoe	Composer, Multi Instruments
1990	Ralph Tresvant	Ralph Tresvant	Composer, Guitar, Keyboards, Vocals (Background)
1990	The Rebirth Of Cool	Laquan	Composer, Producer
1989	Annie Haslam	Annie Haslam	Composer
1987	Who's That Girl	Madonna	Songwriter, Producer
1986	Back to School		Performer, Primary Artist, Producer
1986	The Best of Angela Bofill [Arista]	Angela Bofill	Composer
1986	The Karate Kid, Pt. 2		Composer, Producer
1985	Chemistry	Johnny Gill	Composer, Songwriter
1983	Teaser	Angela Bofill	Composer
1982	Hungry Nights	Tom Snow	Composer
1939|Reckless Love	Crimson Tide	Unknown Contributor Role	
