= Keep On Keepin' On (song) =

"Keep On, Keepin' On"

Single by MC Lyte featuring Xscape

from the album Sunset Park and Bad As I Wanna B
- Released: March 13, 1996
- Recorded: 1995
- Genre: Hip hop; R&B
- Length: 4:35
- Label: Elektra; East West Records
- Songwriters: Lana Moorer; Jermaine Dupri; Michael Jackson
- Producer: Jermaine Dupri

MC Lyte singles chronology
"I Go On" (1993)	"Keep On, Keepin' On" (1996)	"Everyday" (1996)

Xscape singles chronology
"Do You Want To" / "Can't Hang" (1996)	"Keep On, Keepin' On" (1996)	"Am I Dreamin'" (1997)

"Keep On, Keepin' On" is a song by American rapper MC Lyte featuring American girl group Xscape. It was produced and co-written by Jermaine Dupri and samples Michael Jackson's 1989 single "Liberian Girl". It was featured on the soundtrack to Sunset Park, starring Rhea Perlman, and later appeared also on MC Lyte's fifth studio album, Bad As I Wanna B (1996). The song became her highest charting single in the US, peaking at No. 7 and 10 on the Cash Box Top 100 and Billboard Hot 100 charts. It also became her second single to achieve a gold certification from the RIAA, earning the award on May 31, 1996. In November of the same year, Lyte performed the song when she appeared in the second season of the UPN sitcom Moesha alongside Xscape themselves.

== Critical reception ==
Larry Flick from Billboard magazine felt the soundtrack to Sunset Park "gets an excellent introduction with this ticking jeep cruiser that is fueled by Lyte's reliably sharp, smart, rhymes, Xscape's shimmering harmonizing, and deft use of a sample from Michael Jackson's 'Liberian Girl'. Jermaine Dupri produced the cut with a spare, diamond-hard heat and delicate Caribbean keyboard flavors. Will likely begin a healthy commercial ruin with hip-hop enthusiasts before making a much deserved transition into the mainstream pop arena." Alan Jones from Music Week noted that "Keep On, Keepin' On" "has been cleaned up for radio and is a splendid rap, further decorated by Xscape's soulful interjections. Based on a looped portion of Michael Jackson's 'Liberian Girl', it's a strong contender." A reviewer from People Magazine said it is "so ridiculously snappy that you half expect the 26-year-old rapper to finally drop her guard and burst into song."

== Single track listing ==
A1: "Keep On, Keepin' On" - 4:33
A2: "Keep On, Keepin' On" (Clean Version) - 4:33
B1" "Keep On, Keepin' On" - 4:33
B2: "Keep On, Keepin' On" (Instrumental) - 4:33
B3: "Keep On, Keepin' On" (Acappella) - 4:31

== Charts and certifications ==
=== Weekly charts ===
Chart (1996–1997)	Peak position
Germany (GfK)	32
Israel (Israeli Singles Chart)	27
New Zealand (Recorded Music NZ)	18
Netherlands (Dutch Top 40)	36
Netherlands (Single Top 100)	38
Scottish Singles Sales (Official Charts)	57
Sweden (Sverigetopplistan)	29
Switzerland (Schweizer Hitparade)	41
UK Singles (Official Charts)	27
UK Dance (Official Charts)	9
UK Hip Hop/R&B (Official Charts)	5
US Billboard Hot 100	10
US Dance Singles Sales (Billboard)	2
US Hot R&B/Hip-Hop Songs (Billboard)	3
US Hot Rap Songs (Billboard)	2
US Rhythmic Airplay (Billboard)	11
US Cash Box Top 100	7

=== Year-end charts ===
End of year chart (1996)	Position
US Billboard Hot 100	77

=== Certifications ===
Region	Certification	Certified units/sales
United States (RIAA)	Gold	600,000
