= Dust to Dust (Pete Nice and DJ Richie Rich album) =

Studio album by Prime Minister Pete Nice and Daddy Rich
- Released: April 27, 1993
- Recorded: 1992–1993
- Studios: Rampant Recording Studio (New York City, New York); Chung King Studios (New York City, New York); LGK Studios (Leonia, New Jersey)
- Genre: East Coast hip hop
- Length: 59:41
- Labels: Def Jam; Columbia; Sony Music
- Producers: Pete Nice; DJ Richie Rich; The Beatnuts; Sam Sever; KMD

Prime Minister Pete Nice and Daddy Rich chronology
Derelicts of Dialect (1991)	Dust to Dust (1993)

Singles from Dust to Dust
- 1. "Rat Bastard" Released: June 8, 1993; 2. "Kick the Bobo" Released: March 15, 1994

Professional ratings
Review scores
Source	Rating
AllMusic	2.5/5 stars
Entertainment Weekly	B−
RapReviews	8/10

Dust to Dust is a studio album by former 3rd Bass members Prime Minister Pete Nice and Daddy Rich. It was released on April 27, 1993, via Def Jam Recordings/Columbia Records/Sony Music Entertainment, a year after the breakup of 3rd Bass. The album features numerous disses towards their former bandmate MC Serch. The recording sessions took place in New York at Rampant Recording Studio, Chung King Studios, and LGK Studios. Production was handled by Pete Nice, Richie Rich, The Beatnuts, KMD, and Sam "Sever" Citrin of Downtown Science.

The album found limited success, reaching #171 on the Billboard 200, #50 on Top R&B/Hip-Hop Albums, and #8 on the Top Heatseekers Albums. It spawned two singles and corresponding music videos for "Rat Bastard" and "Kick the Bobo," both of which were apparent disses aimed at MC Serch. The "Rat Bastard" video starts with a scene reminiscent of the 1987 film The Untouchables, in which Nice is depicted beating an MC Serch lookalike to death with a baseball bat. This album featured the professional debut of indie rap artist Cage.

== Track listing ==
No.	Title	Producer(s)	Length
1.	"Rat Bastard" (featuring Psycho Les)	The Beatnuts	4:03
2.	"The Sleeper"	Pete Nice; DJ Richie Rich	4:19
3.	"Kick the Bobo"	Pete Nice; DJ Richie Rich	4:27
4.	"Verbal Massage"	The Beatnuts	4:05
5.	"The Lumberjack"	Pete Nice; DJ Richie Rich	4:09
6.	"Pass the Pickle"	Pete Nice; DJ Richie Rich	1:05
7.	"The Rapsody (In J Minor)"	Sam Sever	5:25
8.	"Ho"	The Beatnuts	3:58
9.	"Outta My Way Baby"	The Beatnuts	3:50
10.	"3 Blind Mice" (featuring Kurious & Benz)	Pete Nice; DJ Richie Rich	4:54
11.	"The World According to Hubert Dover"	KMD	1:09
12.	"Rich Bring 'Em Back" (featuring Cage & Benz)	Pete Nice; DJ Richie Rich	3:22
13.	"Blowin' Smoke"	Pete Nice; DJ Richie Rich	4:06
14.	"Double Duty Got Dicked"	Pete Nice; DJ Richie Rich	2:03
15.	"Dust to Dust"	Pete Nice; DJ Richie Rich	3:24
16.	"Verbal Massage (Part II)"	The Beatnuts	5:22
Total length:			59:41

== Charts ==
Chart (1993)	Peak position
US Billboard 200	171
US Top R&B/Hip-Hop Albums (Billboard)	50
US Heatseekers Albums (Billboard)	8
