= A Constipated Monkey =

Studio album by Kurious
- Released: January 18, 1994
- Recorded: May 1992–April 1993
- Studio: Chung King (New York City, New York); Rampant (New York City, New York); LGK (Leonia, New Jersey)
- Genre: Hip-hop
- Length: 53:08
- Label: Columbia; Sony Music
- Producer: Pete Nice (also exec.); the Beatnuts; John Gamble; Geeby Dajani; Dante Ross; DJ Richie Rich; Bosco Money

Kurious chronology
A Constipated Monkey (1994)	II (2009)

Singles from A Constipated Monkey
- 1. "Walk Like a Duck" Released: 1992; 2. "Uptown Shit" Released: May 1993; 3. "I'm Kurious" Released: March 1994

Professional ratings
Review scores
Source	Rating
AllMusic	3/5 stars
RapReviews	8/10
The Source	3.5/5 stars

A Constipated Monkey is the debut studio album by American rapper Kurious. It was released on January 18, 1994, through Hoppoh Recordings/Columbia Records/Sony Music Entertainment. The recording sessions took place in New York at Chung King Studios, Rampant Recording Studio, and LGK Studios. The album was produced by the Beatnuts, Stimulated Dummies, Pete Nice and DJ Richie Rich of 3rd Bass, and Bosco Money of Downtown Science. It features guest appearances from Casual, MF Grimm, Psycho Les, Kadi and the Omen. The album peaked at No. 68 on the Top R&B/Hip-Hop Albums and No. 31 on the Heatseekers Albums in the United States. A Constipated Monkey produced three singles: "Walk Like a Duck", "Uptown Shit" and "I'm Kurious".

== Track listing ==
No.	Title	Producer(s)	Length
1.	"Spell It wit a J (Yes, Yes Jorge)"	The Beatnuts	5:05
2.	"Top Notch" (featuring Psycho Les, Kadi, & Lucien Revolucien)	The Beatnuts	4:04
3.	"I'm Kurious"	Pete Nice; DJ Richie Rich	3:55
4.	"Uptown Shit" (featuring Kadi & the Omen)	The Beatnuts	4:36
5.	"Leave Ya' with This"	Stimulated Dummies	3:42
6.	"Fresh Out the Box"	Stimulated Dummies*	5:15
7.	"Walk Like a Duck"	The Beatnuts	4:56
8.	"Tear Shit Up"	The Beatnuts	3:40
9.	"Baby Bust It" (featuring Grimm Reaper & Kadi)	Stimulated Dummies	4:30
10.	"Nikole"	Bosco Money	4:22
11.	"What's the Real" (featuring Casual)	Stimulated Dummies	4:27
12.	"Jorge of the Projects"	Stimulated Dummies	4:34
Total length:			53:08

Amalgam Digital reissue bonus tracks
No.	Title	Producer(s)	Length
13.	"Mansion and a Yacht" (featuring Sadat X)	The Groove Merchantz
14.	"I'm Kurious" (Remix)	Prime Minister Pete Nice; Daddy Rich

* Production for "Fresh Out the Box" was mistakenly credited to the Beatnuts. Both the writing credits and comments by Dante Ross show that it was produced by the Stimulated Dummies.

== Charts ==
Chart (1994)	Peak position
US Top R&B/Hip-Hop Albums (Billboard)	68
US Heatseekers Albums (Billboard)	31
