= The Stretch Armstrong and Bobbito Show =

American hip hop radio show

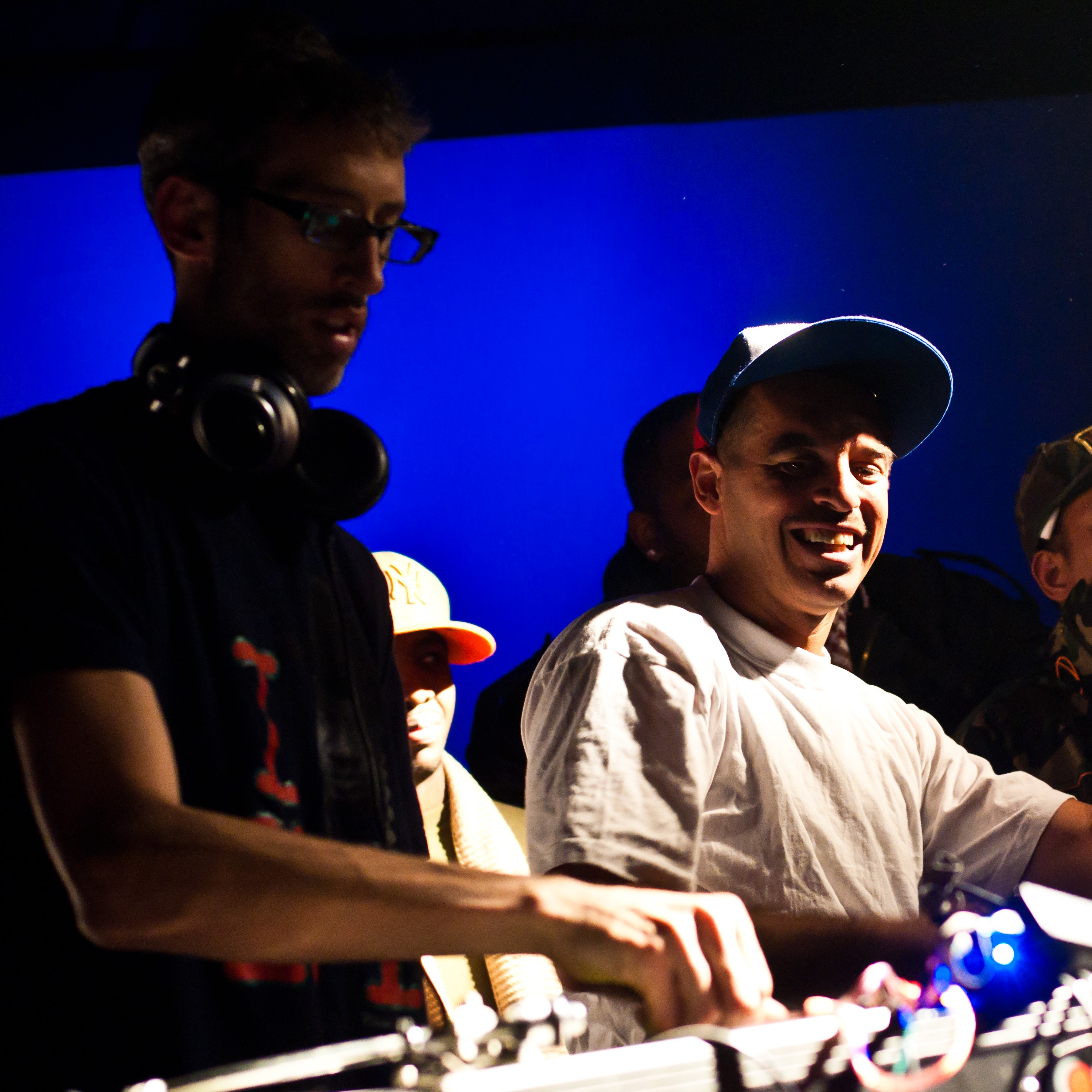
- Stretch Armstrong (left) and Bobbito Garcia (pictured here in 2011)
- Other names: Stretch and Bobbito
- Genre: Underground hip hop
- Running time: ~4 hours (1:00 am – 5:00 am)
- Country of origin: United States
- Home station: WKCR (1990–1998); WQHT (1996–1999)
- Starring: Adrian "Stretch Armstrong" Bartos; Robert "Bobbito" Garcia
- Recording studio: Columbia University, Upper Manhattan, New York
- Original release: October 25, 1990 – January 10, 1999
- No. of episodes: 212

The Stretch Armstrong and Bobbito Show (also referred to as Stretch and Bobbito) was an underground hip hop radio show broadcast in New York, originally on 89.9 WKCR-FM, the student radio station at Columbia University, and later on 97.1 WQHT-FM. The show was hosted by Adrian Bartos (DJ Stretch Armstrong) and Robert "Bobbito" Garcia, and functioned as an alternative to commercial hip hop radio by airing unsigned artists, rarities and B-sides from commercial artists, and live freestyles and DJ scratch sessions. The show has been credited with introducing the world to Biggie Smalls, Eminem, Jay-Z, Big L, Big Pun, Fat Joe, Wu Tang Clan, Fugees and many other names which would rise to prominence in the mid to late 1990s.

== History ==
=== WKCR ===
In the late 1980s, DJ Stretch Armstrong was a club DJ in New York, and Bobbito worked as a Radio Show Promotions Rep for Def Jam. Armstrong had the idea to DJ his own hip hop radio show while attending Columbia University as a freshman, and recruited Bobbito to host the program. WKCR had already aired a hip hop radio show from 1986 to 1988 called "We Could Do This Show", hosted by Pete Nice from 3rd Bass and DJ Clark Kent with DJ Richie Rich filling in at times. Although Stretch and Bobbito reportedly weren't influenced by this predecessor show on their station, Bobbito has cited Pete Nice's 3rd Bass counterpart MC Serch as integral to his career trajectory.

The first episode of The Stretch Armstrong and Bobbito Show aired on October 25, 1990, from 1am to 5am, and featured guests Latee and Def Jeff. The first song played on the program was Ego Trippin' by Ultramagnetic MCs. Armstrong's connections as a club DJ, and Bobbito's connections at Def Jam, gave them access to some of their early guests like The Flavor Unit's Latee, Jungle Brothers, and Large Professor, who helped bolster the show's early reputation. The show continued to air on Thursdays from 1am to 5am on 89.9 and would become informally known as "89tec9" by the hosts and listeners.

Live freestyling became an element of the show on the second episode aired on November 8, 1990, with guests MC Serch, Two Kings in a Cipher, Kurious, and AJ Damane. From then on freestyling became an integral part of the show, and an unsigned emcee's freestyle could get them public recognition and in many instances record deals. Dante Ross, then Vice President of A&R at Elektra Records, signed Ol’ Dirty Bastard after hearing his Shimmy Shimmy Ya verses on the show that aired on January 28, 1993. El Da Sensei and Tame One of the hip hop group Artifacts were invited up to the show when they were still called That's Them after Tame rhymed live on the air via the telephone. They were soon signed to Big Beat/Atlantic by Stretch, who was working at the label, and his co-worker Daddy Reef, another regular unofficial co-host of the show. Stretch and Bobbito were also able to air world premiers of countless songs like Nas' "It Aint Hard To Tell" which aired on October 28, 1993.

As a result of the show's late time slot, Stretch and Bobbito were not required to censor themselves, or their guess, or the music they played, under an FCC policy known as "safe harbor." Lord Sear, who became a co-host of the show and served as comedic relief, took advantage of this with unabashed roasting of callers and guests, which contributed even more to the show's contrast with commercial radio. Celebrity guests like Rosie Perez, Rosario Dawson, and Quincy Jones also made appearances on the show.

As the show's popularity increased, DJ Stretch Armstrong grew uncomfortable with ownership of the show being attributed to Bobbito by fans and interviewers, and the show's name was changed to The Stretch Armstrong Show with Host Bobbito.

=== Hot 97 ===
On February 11, 1996, Stretch and Bobbito began airing their show Sundays on Hot 97, the prominent commercial hip hop radio station in New York, while continuing to air late Thursdays on WKCR. The transition to Hot 97 resulted in new FCC restrictions on the hosts and guest lyricists who could no longer use profanity, which altered the show's overall vibe and created a schism in their core listenership. While the show had changed its time slot and demeanor for Hot 97, the artists who appeared on the show continued to be prominent and relevant. Guests on their Hot 97 show included DJ Premier, Black Star, De La Soul, Common, Xzibit, Noreaga, Brand Nubian, and more. Eminem and Royce da 5'9"'s October 11, 1998 appearance was on the Hot 97 Sunday show, which was considered his introduction to the New York City hip hop scene before the release of his debut LP in 1999. Stretch and Bobbito began developing creative differences, and Stretch experienced a loss of enthusiasm for contemporary hip hop from 1997 to 1998 which resulted in his frequent absence from the show, at which point Bobbito began DJing under the name DJ Cucumber Slice while hosting the show. The hosts' creative differences and ambivalence toward the work came to a head and the show eventually ended on January 10, 1999.

== Later years ==
On February 10, 2011, Stretch and Bobbito hosted a 20th anniversary reunion concert at Le Poisson Rouge in New York which featured performances and attendances by Raekwon, Artifacts, Buckshot, Masta Ace, The Beatnuts, DJ Premier, and more.

In October 2015, Bobbito Garcia released the documentary Stretch and Bobbito: Radio That Changed Lives, which he wrote and directed. The documentary outlines the inception and history of The Stretch Armstrong and Bobbito Show featuring video and audio material from the show's 1990–98 run, as well as reflective interviews with emcees who were connected to the show such as Nas, Jay Z, Eminem, Raekwon, Large Professor, Pharoahe Monch and many more.

Stretch and Bobbito re-united for radio in 2016 and began airing episodes from Samsung's 837 studio in New York City.

On July 18, 2017, the "What's Good with Stretch and Bobbito" podcast began airing through NPR studios. Stretch and Bobbito have used the new platform to continue exploring the realm of hip hop, and have expanded the show's interest to more general pop culture by interviewing actors, comedians, activists, authors, renowned chefs and more. In 2018 The Atlantic named the new show "One of the 50 best podcasts of 2018".

In 2020 the duo released the debut album No Requests featuring The M19's Band. The album has been described as "Latin, Afro-beat, Samba, Jazz, Reggae, and Soul reinterpretations of dance floor bangers".

== Cultural impact ==
In The Source's 100th issue, released in January 1998, The Stretch Armstrong and Bobbito Show was named the "best hip hop radio show", rated above The Wake Up Show with Sway and Tech on 92.3 The Beat, Mr. Magic and Marley Marl on WBLS, and Red Alert on KISS FM.

Freestyles from The Stretch Armstrong and Bobbito Show have been included on artists' albums and compilations over the years. Some examples include "98 Freestyle" from Big L's posthumous album "The Big Picture", "The Stretch Armstrong and Bobbito Show on WKCR October 28, 1993", featuring Nas, 6'9", Jungle & Grand Wizard, on the album Illmatic XX, "Live from the D.J. Stretch Armstrong Show", featuring Black Thought, Common, Pharoahe Monch & Absolute AKA Xtra, from Lyricist Lounge, Vol. 1, "Stretch & Bobbito Promo (Intro By Serch)" from O.C.'s 2010 O-Zone Originals EP, "Stretch and Bobbito INI freestyle" from Rob O's 2006 album Rhyme Pro, and three tracks from Necro's 2001 album, Rare Demos and Freestyles, Vol. 2.

In the documentary film Stretch and Bobbito: Radio That Changed Lives, Nas states that "at that time, [The Stretch Armstrong and Bobbito Show] was the most important show in the world. I wrote most of my first album listening to [the] show". According to The Source, the total record sales of emcees who premiered on The Stretch Armstrong and Bobbito Show have exceeded 300 million.
