= Greg Williamson (concert producer) =

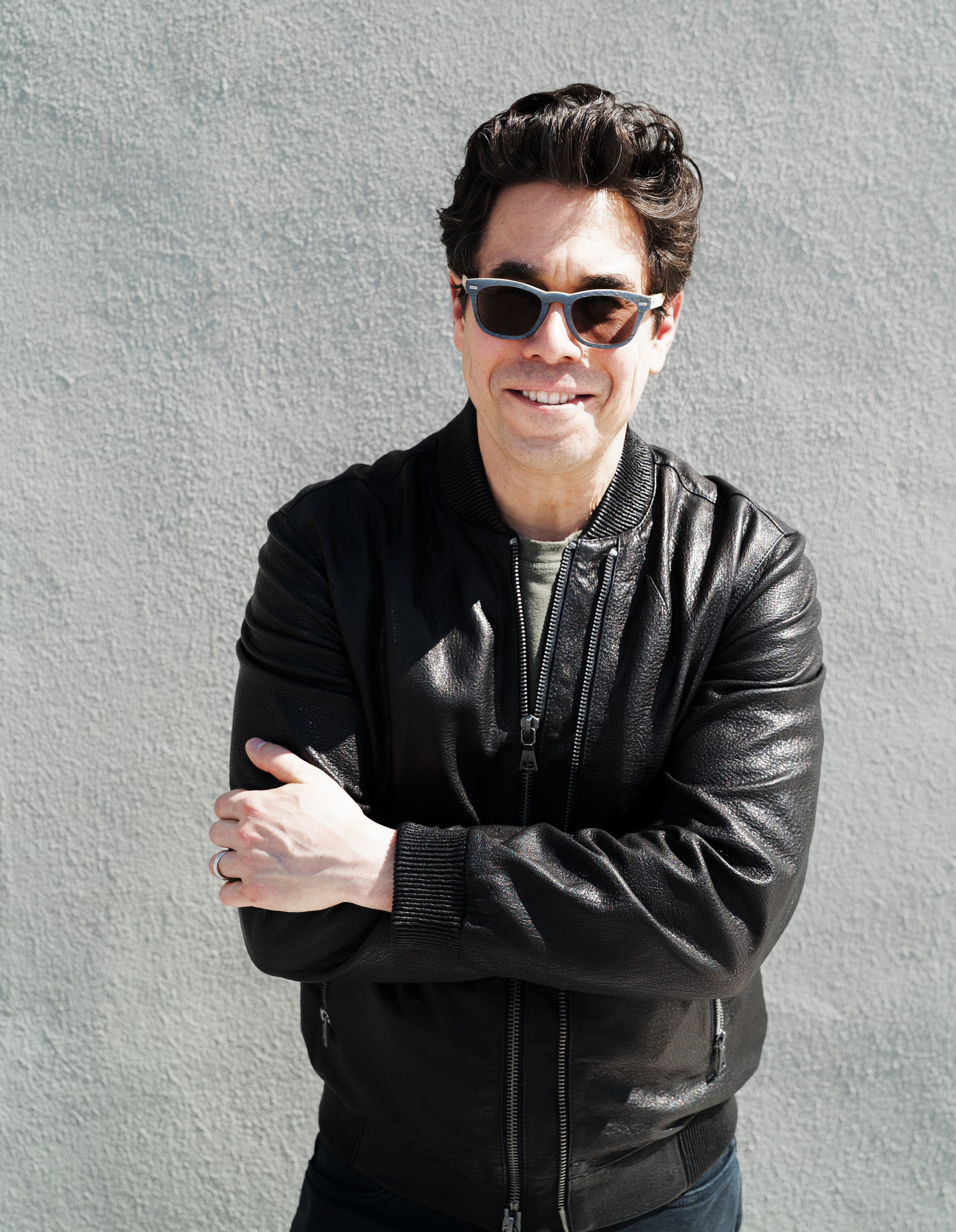
- Born: 1979 (age 46–47); New York City, NY
- Occupations: Concert producer, philanthropist, real estate broker

Greg Williamson is an American concert producer, philanthropist, real estate broker, and property investor. He is the co-founder and co-executive producer of Love Rocks NYC, an annual all-star benefit concert supporting the nonprofit God’s Love We Deliver.

== Early life and education ==
Williamson attended Hobart and William Smith Colleges before beginning a career in New York City real estate and investment.

== Career ==
=== Real estate ===
Williamson began his professional career teaching school in New York. He then worked in New York City real estate and later became a licensed associate real estate broker with Douglas Elliman.

=== Concert production and live events ===
Williamson entered the live entertainment industry through charitable and community-focused music events. He later co-founded RWE Partners, a New York–based production and entertainment company.

In 2017, Williamson co-founded Love Rocks NYC alongside fashion designer John Varvatos and professional event planner Nicole Rechter. Held primarily at the Beacon Theatre, Love Rocks NYC has featured performances and appearances by artists including Paul Simon, Cher, Alicia Keys, Dave Grohl, Keith Richards, Jon Bon Jovi, Robert Plant, Nile Rodgers & Chic, Hozier and Dave Matthews.

Love Rocks NYC concerts have raised more than $70 million for the charity, God’s Love We Deliver, which feeds New York residents who cannot feed themselves due to illness.

In December 2021, Williamson and Rechter launched The SoHo Sessions, an invitation-only live performance series held in a private downtown Manhattan loft space associated with the former Chung King Studios. The series blends intimate musical performances with philanthropy and cultural programming and hosts artists, actors, comedians, and media figures.

== Philanthropy ==
Williamson serves on the boards of God’s Love We Deliver, CityParks Foundation, and The Churchill School and Center.

Through Love Rocks NYC, Williamson has jointly establish one of the largest annual fundraising events benefiting God’s Love We Deliver, a New York nonprofit organization that provides medically tailored meals to individuals living with severe illness.
