= Return of the Product =

Studio album by MC Serch
- Released: August 25, 1992
- Recorded: November 1991–July 1992
- Studio: Chung King Studios (New York City, New York); Chapel Studios (Los Angeles, California); Red Chamber Studios (Los Angeles, California)
- Genre: East Coast hip-hop; alternative hip-hop
- Length: 45:21
- Label: Def Jam; Columbia
- Producer: T-Ray; MC Serch (also exec.); Wolf & Epic; Skeff Anselm

MC Serch chronology
Derelicts of Dialect (1991)	Return of the Product (1992)

Singles from Return of the Product
- 1. "Here It Comes" Released: July 16, 1992; 2. "Back to the Grill" Released: December 24, 1992

Professional ratings
Review scores
Source	Rating
AllMusic	3.5/5 stars
Entertainment Weekly	B−
Rolling Stone	4/5 stars

Return of the Product is the only solo studio album by former 3rd Bass member MC Serch. It was released August 25, 1992 on Def Jam Recordings and Columbia Records. Recording sessions took place at Chung King Studios in New York City, at Chapel Studios and Red Chamber Studios in Los Angeles through November 1991 to July 1992. Production was handled by T-Ray, Skeff Anselm, Epic Mazur and Richard Wolf, with MC Serch serving as executive and co-producer. It features guest appearances from Chubb Rock, Joe Fatal, Nas and Red Hot Lover Tone.

The album peaked at number 103 on the Billboard 200, at number 28 on the Top R&B/Hip-Hop Albums and at number 2 on the Heatseekers Albums in the United States. Return of the Product spawned a hit single "Back to the Grill Again", which reached number 1 on the Hot Rap Singles chart. The title of "Back to the Grill Again" is a reference to the Main Source track "Live At The Barbeque".

== Track listing ==
No.	Title	Producer(s)	Length
1.	"Here It Comes"	Wolf & Epic; MC Serch (co.)	3:31
2.	"Don't Have to Be"	Wolf & Epic; MC Serch (co.)	3:06
3.	"Back to the Grill" (featuring Chubb Rock, Nasty Nas and Red Hot Lover Tone)	T-Ray; MC Serch (co.)	5:07
4.	"Hard But True"	Wolf & Epic; MC Serch (co.)	3:45
5.	"Return of the Product"	Wolf & Epic; MC Serch (co.)	5:08
6.	"Daze in a Weak"	T-Ray; MC Serch (co.)	2:39
7.	"Can You Dig It"	Wolf & Epic; MC Serch (co.)	4:05
8.	"Social Narcotics" (featuring Joe Fatal)	T-Ray; MC Serch (co.)	5:17
9.	"Hits the Head"	Skeff Anslem	4:23
10.	"Scenes from the Mind"	T-Ray; MC Serch (co.)	4:05
11.	"Here It Comes Again"	T-Ray; MC Serch (co.)	4:35
Total length:			45:21

== Charts ==
Chart (1992)	Peak position
US Billboard 200	103
US Top R&B/Hip-Hop Albums (Billboard)	28
US Heatseekers Albums (Billboard)	2
