= Pop Goes the Weasel (3rd Bass song) =

Single by 3rd Bass

from the album Derelicts of Dialect
- B-side: "Derelict of Dialect"
- Released: May 1, 1991
- Recorded: November 1990
- Genre: Hip hop
- Length: 3:55
- Label: Def Jam; Columbia
- Songwriter(s): Michael Berrin; John Dajani; Peter Gabriel; John Gamble; Peter Nash; Dante Ross; Stevie Wonder
- Producer(s): MC Serch; Pete Nice; DJ Richie Rich

3rd Bass singles chronology
"Product of the Environment" (1990)	"Pop Goes the Weasel" (1991)	"Portrait of an Artist as a Hood" (1992)

"Pop Goes the Weasel" is a single by American hip hop trio 3rd Bass; it appears on their second album, Derelicts of Dialect (1991). The song samples "You Haven't Done Nothin'" by Stevie Wonder as well as Peter Gabriel's hit, "Sledgehammer" and “Eminence Front” by the Who. Production came from John Gamble, Geeby Dajani, and Dante Ross. It reached the top 40 of the US Billboard Hot 100 and was certified gold by the Recording Industry Association of America (RIAA).

== Music video ==
The music video stars Henry Rollins as Vanilla Ice, who is beaten up by 3rd Bass at the end of the video.

== Charts ==
Chart performance for "Pop Goes the Weasel"
Chart (1991)	Peak position
Australia (ARIA)	122
US Billboard Hot 100	29
US Dance Club Songs (Billboard)	28
US Hot R&B/Hip-Hop Songs (Billboard)	26
US Hot Rap Songs (Billboard)	1

== Certifications ==
Certifications for "Pop Goes the Weasel"
Region	Certification	Certified units/sales
United States (RIAA)	Gold	500,000^{^}
^{^} Shipments figures based on certification alone.
