= DJ Reach =

American music producer and DJ (born 1979)

- Birth name: Semu Namakajo
- Also known as: DJ Reach
- Born: 1979
- Origin: Harlem, New York City, U.S.
- Genres: Hip hop 80s Rock; 70s 80s Electro
- Occupation(s): Producer, DJ
- Years active: 1992–present
- Labels: 80 ML Productions
- Website: Official website

DJ Reach (born Semu A. Namakajo in 1979) is an American music producer and DJ. He is considered a prominent figure in the New York City and Las Vegas club scene and first gained significant notice after being the official DJ for Last Call with Carson Daly.

== Biography ==
DJ Reach began his music career as a disc jockey at the age of 13 after receiving inspiration from the film Juice. In 2001 DJ Reach graduated from Wesleyan University.

After interning for his mentor DJ Stretch Armstrong of "The Stretch Armstrong and Bobbito Show" on WKCR, Reach learned the importance of being unique and creating his own mix.

His open format style and ear for mixing eclectic DJ sets eventually led to his residency at high-profile night clubs, corporate, celebrity events including Pink Elephant, PM, TAO, Prime and Marque; Playboy's Super Bowl Bash, NASCAR/Nextel Cup Series Championship Party, Madonna's Confessions tour after party and Jay-Z's infamous 24 hour Hanger tour.
