= Downtown Science =

Downtown Science may refer to:

- Downtown Science (group), a short-lived hip hop music group
- Downtown Science (Downtown Science album), 1991
- Downtown Science (Blockhead album), 2005
