= The Cactus Revisited =

Remix album by 3rd Bass
- Released: September 7, 1990
- Genre: Hip hop
- Length: 36:39
- Label: Def Jam; Columbia
- Producer: 3rd Bass; Sam Sever; Dante Ross; Eric "Vietnam" Sadler; Geeby Dajani; Hank Shocklee; John Gamble; Keith Shocklee; Mr. Puffy McScruffy; Prince Paul

3rd Bass chronology
The Cactus Album (1989)	The Cactus Revisited (1990)	Derelicts of Dialect (1991)

Professional ratings
Review scores
Source	Rating
AllMusic	2.5/5 stars

The Cactus Revisited is a remix extended play by American Queens-based hip hop trio 3rd Bass. It was released on September 7, 1990, via Def Jam Recordings. Out of a total seven tracks, the album consists of six remixed songs from The Cactus Album and one unreleased song. The remixing was provided by 3rd Bass themselves, Dave Dorrell, Marley Marl, Prince Paul, CJ Mackintosh, and Sam Sever of Downtown Science. It received both lackluster commercial and critical reception and is considered to be a patchy diversion, according to Dean Carlson of AllMusic.

== Track listing ==
No.	Title	Producer(s)	Length
1.	"The Gas Face" (Remixed by Prince Paul)	Prince Paul; 3rd Bass (co.)	2:13
2.	"The Cactus" (Remixed by Dave Dorrell)	Pete Nice; Sam Sever; Mr. Puffy McScruffy	5:48
3.	"Wordz of Wizdom" (Remixed by 3rd Bass & Sam Sever)	Pete Nice; Sam Sever	8:00
4.	"3 Strikes 5000" (Vocal)	3rd Bass; Stimulated Dummies	4:14
5.	"Brooklyn-Queens" (Remixed by CJ Mackintosh & Dave Dorrell)	Pete Nice	7:16
6.	"Product of the Environment" (Remixed by Marley Marl)	3rd Bass; Sam Sever	4:27
7.	"Steppin' to the A.M." (Remixed by 3rd Bass)	Eric "Vietnam" Sadler; Hank Shocklee; Keith Shocklee	4:36
Total length:			36:39

Tracks 1 & 7 are new remixes not released elsewhere. Track 2 was released on a 1990 UK 12" as "The Cactus (Egyptian Mix)", where it was followed by a brief coda with someone badly singing the lyric "Walk Like an Egyptian". Track 3 was released in 1989 as "Wordz of Wizdom (II)" on CD editions of The Cactus Album and as "Wordz of Wizdom (Death in the Afternoon)" on the original 12" of "The Gas Face". Tracks 4 and 6 were released on the 1990 "Product of the Environment" 12" & cassette maxi-single, where the latter track was titled "Product of the Environment (Project Remix)".
