= Pete Nice =

American rapper (born 1967)

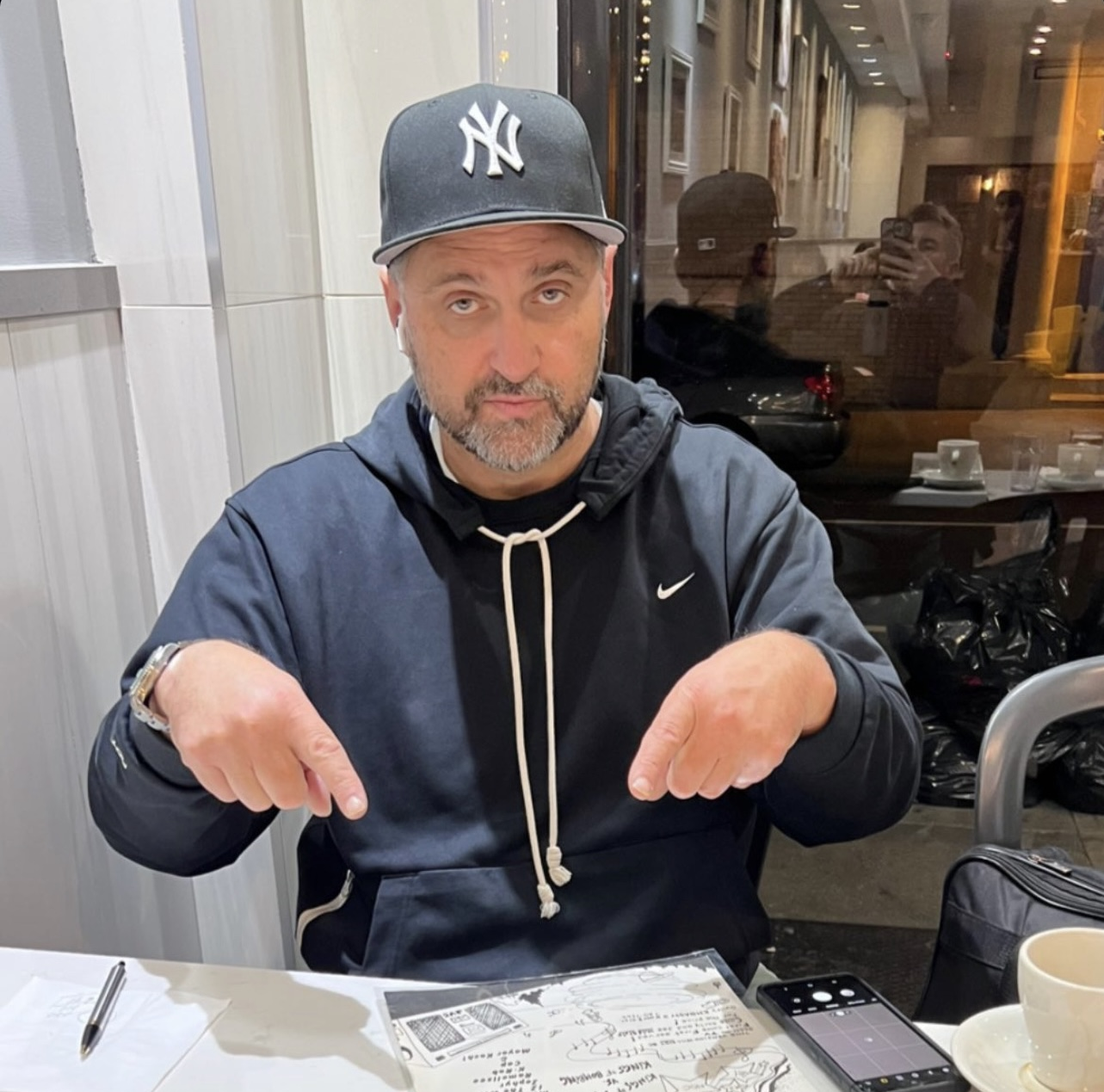
- Nice in 2023
- Born: February 5, 1967 (age 59); Brooklyn, New York City, U.S.
- Education: Columbia University
- Occupations: Rapper; producer; baseball historian; author
- Years active: 1985–present
- Spouse: Roxanne Nash
- Children: 1
- Relatives: Brian Nash (brother)
- Musical career
- Also known as: Prime Minister Pete Nice
- Genres: East Coast hip hop; golden age hip hop
- Years active: 1985–1994; 1998–2000; 2013
- Labels: Def Jam; Columbia; CBS
- Formerly of: 3rd Bass

Peter J. Nash (born February 5, 1967), known by his stage name Prime Minister Pete Nice or simply Pete Nice, is an American baseball historian and author, member of the Society for American Baseball Research, Hip Hop historian, and former rapper and record producer. Nash gained recognition as one-third of Def Jam's golden age hip hop group 3rd Bass.

== Early life ==
Peter Nash was born on February 5, 1967, in Greenpoint, Brooklyn, New York, to Carole and Raymond Nash. After a successful high school basketball career, Nash graduated from Bishop Ford High School in 1985, joining the Columbia Lions Mens Basketball Team while majoring in English. He graduated magna cum laude from Columbia in 1989.

== Music career ==
While in high school, Nash formed a rap group called Sin Qua Non with his friends Buddah B, Kibwe K, and Fresh Fred. Kibwe K's father was a friend of activist Sonny Carson, and through that connection Nash was introduced to Lumumba Carson, later known as Professor X the Overseer of X Clan. Sin Qua Non was briefly managed by Carson before they split in 1985 due to Nash and his fellow group mates going off to college. Following the split Nash continued to be managed by Carson as a solo act alongside other artists such as Positive K, Just-Ice, King Sun, Audio Two, and Stetsasonic.

Nash was introduced to popular Brooklyn graffitist and rapper Blake Letham (known as Lord Scotch, Scotch 79th, or KEO) and future renowned A&R executive Dante Ross by roommate, Mark Pearson (known as SAKE), who later became the road manager for 3rd Bass (Pearson currently serves as the Chief Strategy Officer at AMC Theatres). Dante Ross would eventually introduce Nash to Hip Hop producer Sam Sever, who went on to produce most of The Cactus Album. Around this time Nash formed the rap group Servin' Generalz with Lord Scotch and Cool Papa Sha (or Shameek The Beat Mizer). In 1987 Nash created and hosted the "We Could Do This" radio show with DJ Clark Kent on Columbia's WKCR 89.9 FM on Mondays from 12:30 AM – 1:30 AM. It was one of the first radio shows dedicated solely to Hip Hop. DJ Clark Kent introduced Nash to future 3rd Bass member DJ Richie Rich, who would on occasion fill in as DJ.

Throughout the mid to late 1980s, Nash was a frequent visitor at multiple popular New York City Hip Hop clubs, including the Latin Quarter. It was here around 1986 that Nash was introduced to MC Serch by Lord Scotch. MC Serch, then going only by Serch, was also a solo act who had released a few songs. At this point the two were merely acquaintances with no intention of forming a group.

By 1987, following the dissolution of The Servin' Generalz, Nash continued to work on his solo demo tape. He began collaborating with MC Serch through their mutual connections to Dante Ross and Sam Sever. Through suggestion by Ross, the pair formed 3 the Hard Way, a moniker taken from the popular 1974 blaxploitation film of the same name. Unable to legally secure the name due to copyright restrictions, the group settled on the name 3rd Bass. Nash, a long time historical baseball admirer, chose the name.

With Richard Lawson the group released two gold-selling albums, The Cactus Album and Derelicts of Dialect, before disbanding in 1992. Nice teamed up with his former group mate Daddy Rich, and the pair released their only collaboration, Dust to Dust, in April 1993.

That same year Pete Nice and author-radio jock Bobbito Garcia launched their own label, Hoppoh Records, under the aegis of Columbia Records. They also started Hit-U-Off Management, representing artists like Hard 2 Obtain (H2O) and The Artifacts. The first release was Kurious's 1994 album A Constipated Monkey; Nice co-produced the album and the single "I'm Kurious". Nashville artist Count Bass D's debut Pre-Life Crisis followed in 1995, distributed by Columbia sister label Chaos Recordings, but those would be the only records released before the label folded because of creative differences with Columbia.

In October 1998, Nash reunited with MC Serch to perform at a birthday party for fashion designer Andy Hilfiger. The two went on to perform on the first day of Woodstock 1999. During this reunion period Nash recorded some music before dissolving the group again in 2000. Another brief reunion performance took place in 2013.

Today, Nash is a prominent Hip Hop historian, detailing the progression of Hip Hop from the 1970s and 1980s through rare posters, flyers, and pictures posted on his Instagram page. Since 2014, at the behest of the head curator Paradise Gray of X-Clan, Nash has been a co-curator for the Universal Hip Hop Museum. Nash met Paradise through Lumumba Carson in 1985 when Paradise began his work at the Latin Quarter. The two are currently coauthoring a book called The Golden Age of Hip Hop 1983–1992: An Illustrative History.

== Business ventures ==
Nash made the move from the music business to devoting his time to baseball history. He owned a memorabilia shop in Cooperstown, New York. In 2003, he published his first book, Baseball Legends of Brooklyn's Green-Wood Cemetery, under his real name. He has also been working to secure some property for an official grave site of Negro league players. His younger brother Brian was the Head Men's Basketball Coach at St. Francis College in Brooklyn Heights.

In early 2008, Nash opened McGreevy's 3rd Base Bar (named in honor of Boston publican Michael T. "Nuf Ced" McGreevy's establishment), a sports bar in Boston with Dropkick Murphys' band member Ken Casey. The bar was named Best Sports Bar In Boston by Citysearch in 2009. Due to the COVID-19 pandemic the bar permanently closed in August 2020.

== Legal issues ==
Commencing in 2007 and concluding in 2009, Nash was involved in a legal battle with baseball card dealer Rob Lifson relating to the authenticity of baseball memorabilia he consigned for sale. When deposed under oath, Nash invoked the Fifth Amendment dozens of times in response to questions about the origins of specific pieces of memorabilia. The court found in favor of Lifson, and Nash signed a court order in which he admitted to having committed fraud.

On July 1, 2014, after having pleaded guilty to misdemeanor tax fraud, Nash was sentenced in Albany County court for not paying taxes from 2009 through 2011. As a result, Nash paid $13,101 to the state in back taxes, penalties and interest.

== Discography ==
- 1989: The Cactus Album (with DJ Richie Rich and MC Serch, as 3rd Bass)
- 1990: The Cactus Revisited (with DJ Richie Rich and MC Serch, as 3rd Bass)
- 1991: Derelicts of Dialect (with DJ Richie Rich and MC Serch, as 3rd Bass)
- 1993: Dust to Dust (with DJ Richie Rich)

== Bibliography ==
- 2003: Baseball Legends of Brooklyn's Green-Wood Cemetery
- 2005: Boston's Royal Rooters
