= Ego Trip's Miss Rap Supreme =

American reality television series

- Created by: Ego Trip
- Starring: MC Serch, Yo-Yo
- Country of origin: United States

Production
- Executive producer: Gabriel Alvarez
- Producer: TBA
- Running time: 60 min.
- Production companies: 10 by 10 Entertainment; Ego Trip Ethnic Inc. VH1 Productions

Original release
- Network: VH1
- Release: April 14 – June 9, 2008

Related
- Ego Trip's The (White) Rapper Show

Ego Trip's Miss Rap Supreme is an American reality television series that aired on VH1. It is a follow-up to 2007's Ego Trip's The (White) Rapper Show. In Ego Trip's Miss Rap Supreme, contestants compete to win the title of next great female MC.

The show is hosted by MC Serch and female MC Yo-Yo. It premiered on VH1 in April 2008.

== Contestants ==
Cast

Name	Age	Eliminated	Place
Rece Steele	25	N/A	Winner
Byata	26	Episode 8, Part 2	2nd
Ms. Cherry (Elisa Hood) (Note: Elisa "Ms. Cherry" Hood from Atlanta, GA ended episode 8 in the top 3.)	24	Episode 8, Part 1	3rd
Chiba	27	Episode 7	4th
Nicky2States	28	Episode 6	5th
Bree	23	Episode 5	6th
Lady Twist	22	Episode 4	7th
Lionezz (Note: Lionezz was eliminated on Episode 1, but brought back in Episode 2 after Khia was disqualified.)	27	Episode 3	8th
D.A.B.	23	Episode 2	9th
Khia	30	Episode 2 (DQ)	10th

== Call-out order ==
Serch's call-out order
Placing	Contestants	Episodes								
Placing	Contestants	1	2	3	4	5	6	7	8	
1	Ms. Cherry	Chiba	Byata	Nicky2States	Rece Steele	Nicky2States	Byata	Ms. Cherry	Rece Steele	Rece Steele
2	Byata	Bree	Bree	Rece Steele	Nicky2States	Byata	Ms. Cherry	Rece Steele	Byata	Byata
3	Nicky2States	D.A.B.	Rece Steele	Lady Twist	Byata	Rece Steele	Chiba	Byata	Ms. Cherry	
4	D.A.B.	Lady Twist	Chiba	Chiba	Ms. Cherry	Chiba	Rece Steele	Chiba		
5	Lady Twist	Ms. Cherry	Lionezz	Byata	Bree	Ms. Cherry	Nicky2States			
6	Lionezz	Nicky2States	Lady Twist	Ms. Cherry	Chiba	Bree				
7	Rece Steele	Rece Steele	Nicky2States	Bree	Lady Twist					
8	Bree	Byata	Ms. Cherry	Lionezz						
9	Khia	Khia	D.A.B.							
10	Chiba	Lionezz	Khia							

The contestant was named Miss Rap Supreme.
The winning contestant(s) on that week's challenge, making them safe from elimination
The contestant was named "Miss..." for the week (team MVP)
The contestant was eliminated
The contestant was eliminated and later brought back into the competition
The contestant won the challenge but was eliminated
The contestant was disqualified.

The "Miss..." awards

- Week 1: "Miss Representation"
- Week 2: "Miss Thang"
- Week 3: "Miss Maneater"
- Week 4: "Miss Lady of the Stage"
- Week 5: "Miss Video Venus"
- Week 6: "Miss Popularity"
- Week 7: "Miss Con-G-nality"
- Week 8: "Miss Rap Supreme"

Episode Notes

- Khia was disqualified at the beginning of Episode 2 due to her use of a pre-written song ("Respect Me") for her 16-bar song. Lionezz was brought back as a result.
- In episode 7, Chiba admitted to Byata And Rece Steele that she uses pre-written songs in the competition, but stays original when told to do so. This caused even more tension with the girls. All the girls became suspicious of Chiba when everyone stumbled on their raps, but Chiba did not.
- Although Chiba won the challenge, she was eliminated in episode 7 after being in the bottom two with Byata.

== Celebrity guests ==
- Ghostface Killah
- Too Short
- John Singleton
- Soulja Boy Tell 'Em
- Just Blaze
- WC
- Roxanne Shante
- will.i.am
- Missy Elliott
- Charli Baltimore

== Reception ==
In a mixed review, Common Sense Media's Melissa Camacho gave the series two stars, calling it "an iffy viewing choice for tweens" though she liked that it gave "mature teens a chance to learn more about the rap and hip-hop culture". Anastasia Kotsosavas of the Philadelphia Weekly called Miss Rap Supreme "equally cheesetastic" to its predecessor The (White) Rapper Show. She said she anticipated a mix of Flavor of Love and American Idol but found a rap version of Paradise Hotel.

The Detroit News television critic Adam Graham thought that people who liked White Rapper's "playful take on hip-hop culture" would like Miss Rap Supreme's scenes. He cited how the competitors in the debut episode were given the task of rapping for some "sisters" who turned out to be nuns and sorority sisters. Malcolm X. Abram of the Akron Beacon Journal thought that although the hosts MC Serch and Yo-Yo genuinely hoped to identify a skilled woman rapper, the contestant Khia had a "bad attitude and lack of talent".

== See also ==
- Ego Trip (magazine)
- Ego Trip's The (White) Rapper Show
