= The Soho Sessions =

Live music series

- Genre: Rock, Soul, Blues, R&B, Country
- Location: New York City
- Founders: Nicole Rechter, Greg Williamson
- Industry: 2021 - Present
- Website: thesohosessions.com

The Soho Sessions is a live music series based in New York City. Founded in 2021 by Greg Williamson and Nicole Rechter, the series presents invitation-only performances held in a loft space in the SoHo neighborhood. The events combine live music performances with fundraising and awareness efforts for charitable organizations.

== History ==
The Soho Sessions was established following informal music gatherings hosted by Williamson and Rechter during the COVID-19 pandemic. The events evolved into a recurring series featuring live musical performances and partnerships with nonprofit organizations.

The series takes place in a SoHo loft that was formerly associated with Chung King Studios, a recording studio active in the late 20th century. Performances are held for a private audience and are typically supported by sponsors and partners.

Although the series incorporates charitable components, The Soho Sessions operates as a for-profit business.

== Founders ==
Greg Williamson is a New York City real estate broker and a co-executive producer of the Love Rocks NYC benefit concert. Nicole Rechter is a professional event planner who co-founded The Soho Sessions and executive produces Love Rocks NYC alongside Williamson.

== Performers ==
Artists who have performed at The Soho Sessions include:

- Joe Bonamassa and Slash (2026)
- Olivia Dean (2025)
- Keith Richards (2025)
- Lukas Nelson (2025)
- Maren Morris (2025)
- Nile Rodgers (2025)
- Trombone Shorty (2025)
- Joss Stone (2025)
- Kate Hudson (2025)
- Norah Jones (2025)
- Warren Haynes (2025)
- Elvis Costello (2025)
- Paul Simon (2024)
- Gary Clark JR. (2024)
- Marcus King (2023)
- Celisse (2023)

== Philanthropy ==
Events hosted by The Soho Sessions have supported nonprofit organizations in areas including mental health, education, gun safety, and medical research such as St. Jude Children's Research Hospital, Everytown for Gun Safety, The Stanford Initiative To Cure Hearing Loss, God's Love We Deliver, MindUp, Music Will, Association for Frontotemporal Demential (AFTD) and The Grammy Museum. The format combines live musical performances with fundraising or awareness initiatives connected to selected causes. In 2024, it hosted Simon's benefit concert for the Stanford Initiative to Cure Hearing Loss and was attended by guests that included Whoopi Goldberg, Kevin Bacon, Amy Schumer, Jerry and Jessica Seinfeld, and the musician Jackson Browne. This event is said to have made The Soho Sessions a "full-blown phenomenon".

Morrison Hotel Gallery, a fine art photography gallery specializing in music imagery, has partnered with The Soho Sessions to host joint events that combine live performances with exhibitions of rare and iconic music photography. Proceeds from these events have supported causes including mental health programs for artists, music education for underserved youth, and environmental initiatives. The collaboration reflects a broader commitment to using artistic programming as a vehicle for social advocacy and community benefit.
