= Room to Breathe =

Room to Breathe may refer to:

== Albums ==
- Room to Breathe (Delbert McClinton album), 2002
- Room to Breathe (Reba McEntire album) or the title song, 2003
- Room to Breathe (ZOEgirl album), 2005
- Room to Breathe, by Andy Gullahorn, 2005

== Songs ==
- "Room to Breathe", by Andrew W.K., 1998
- "Room to Breathe", by Blindspott from Blindspott, 2002
- "Room to Breathe", by Chase Bryant, 2016
- "Room to Breathe", by Downtown Science from Downtown Science, 1991
- "Room to Breathe", by You Me at Six from Cavalier Youth, 2014

== Other uses ==
- Room to Breathe, a 2006 short film featuring Art Alexakis
- Room to Breathe, a 1975 book by Jenny James about the Atlantis commune
