= Kurious =

American rapper

- Also known as: The Majician, Biolante, Gappa
- Born: Jorge Antonio Alvarez; May 1, 1970 (age 55); New York City
- Origin: Upper West Side, Manhattan, New York City, New York, US
- Genres: Hip-hop
- Occupations: Rapper, producer
- Years active: 1989–present
- Labels: Amalgam Digital, Hoppoh/Columbia, Rhymesayers, Metal Face

Jorge Antonio Alvarez (born May 1, 1970), better known by his stage names Kurious or Kurious Jorge, is an American hip-hop recording artist from New York City.

== Biography ==
Kurious is of Puerto Rican and Cuban descent, and grew up on the Upper West Side of Manhattan. In 1993, he appeared on Pete Nice and DJ Richie Rich's album Dust to Dust. The duo helped Kurious get a record deal with Columbia Records via Bobbito and Nice's Hoppoh imprint. In 1992, he released his first single, "Walk Like a Duck". Then he signed a contract with Sony Music. In 1994, Kurious released his critically acclaimed debut album A Constipated Monkey.

In 1999, he reemerged on MF Doom's album Operation: Doomsday on the track "?" and contributed a track to a Monsta Island Czars mixtape, under the alias Biollante. Kurious later explained that his contract with Sony was "terrible" and that he "had to wait it out to get out of it." Amalgam Digital reissued A Constipated Monkey with bonus tracks in 2007. In 2009 he released his second solo effort II, which featured the singles "Back From Up Unda", "Back with V.I.C.", "Sittin' in My Car" and "Drinks In The Air."

== Discography ==
=== Albums ===
- 1994: A Constipated Monkey (Hoppoh/Columbia)
- 2009: II (Amalgam Digital)
- 2021: Koncrete Jungle (Chong Wizard Records)
- 2023: Monkeyman (Weaponize Music)
- 2024: Majician (Metalface Records/Rhymesayers Entertainment)
- 2025: God's Time (Casual Dad Records)

=== Singles ===
- 1992: "Walk Like a Duck"
- 1993: "Uptown Shit"
- 1994: "I'm Kurious"
- 2001: "All Great"
- 2009: "Benetton" (feat. MC Serch and MF Doom)
- 2009: "Back With V.I.C."
- 2009: "Sittin’ In My Car"
- 2012: "Much Higher"
- 2012: "White Rum"
- 2012: "Snake Charmer 2"
- 2014: "Delusional"
- 2014: "Pythagorean (Nyc Theme)"
- 2023: "Sweet Child of Mine (feat. Bodega Bamz)"
- 2024: "Adaptive"
- 2025: "Doom on the Beatbox (feat. MF Doom & Team Demo)"

=== Guest appearances ===
- 1991: "Young Stars From Nowhere" (from the Powerule album Volume 1)
- 1993: "Boo Boo Heads" (from the Del tha Funkee Homosapien album No Need for Alarm)
- 1993: "3 Blind Mice" (from the Pete Nice and DJ Richie Rich album Dust to Dust)
- 1994: "Smokin' That Shit" (from the KMD album Black Bastards)
- 1999: "?" (from the MF Doom album Operation: Doomsday)
- 2003: "Mugwort + Cinnamon = Shifting Lanes" (from the MF Grimm & MF Doom album Special Herbs + Spices Volume 1)
- 2003: "Fastlane" (from the King Geedorah album Take Me to Your Leader)
- 2006: "Traveling" (from the MF Grimm album American Hunger)
- 2009: "Supervillainz" (from the MF Doom album Born Like This)
- 2013: "On My Grind" (from the Juellz album Jewelz)
- 2014: "Enough" (from the Homeboy Sandman album Hallways)
- 2023: "KURIOUS INTERLUDE" (from the Lord Sko album UNITED PALACE)
