= Stretch and Bobbito: Radio That Changed Lives =

- Theatrical release poster
- Directed by: Bobbito Garcia
- Produced by: Stretch Armstrong; Bobbito Garcia; Omar Acosta
- Starring: B-Real; DJ Premier; Eminem; Jay-Z; Nas; Rosie Perez; Raekwon
- Distributed by: Saboteur Media; StudioCanal
- Release date: 2015
- Running time: 98 minutes
- Country: United States
- Language: English

Stretch and Bobbito: Radio That Changed Lives is a 2015 documentary film about the Stretch Armstrong and Bobbito Show, starring Adrian "Stretch Armstrong" Bartos and Bobbito Garcia. The influential show helped to launch the careers of numerous hip hop artists, particularly those along the East Coast.

== Background ==
DJ Stretch Armstrong (Adrian Bartos) and Bobbito Garcia hosted the radio show from the WKCR station at Columbia University.
