= Terrence Meck =

- Born: March 4, 1978 (age 48)
- Education: Princeton University
- Occupations: President and Chief Executive Officer, God's Love We Deliver

Terrence Meck is an American nonprofit executive and the President & Chief Executive Officer of God's Love We Deliver, a New York City–based organization that prepares and delivers medically tailored meals to people living with life-altering illnesses.

== Career ==
After Meck's partner Rand Skolnick passed away following a battle with pancreatic cancer, Meck founded The Palette Fund with the proceeds from Skolnick's estate. The Palette Fund, which launched in 2009, provides financial support to organizations working with LGBT youth, HIV/AIDS prevention, nutrition and patient navigation, and endeavors to expand public awareness about each of those issues.

In January 2025, Meck took over as president and chief executive officer of God's Love We Deliver.

== Leadership and Impact ==
In May 2024, Meck made a $200,000 donation from the Palette Fund to the winner of Drag Race All Stars season 9 to give to the charity of their choice.

In July 2025, Meck was featured on MS NOW (formerly MSNBC) talking about the $13.5 billion loss from cuts to Medicaid and ACA-related provisions. Later that month, Meck discussed the loss of his partner, Rand, and the role of food as medicine with Katie Couric.

== Awards ==
- Jeffrey Fashion Cares Community Leadership Awards (2012)
- True Colors Fund Awards (2014)
- The Out100 list (2025)
- Power Players Award (2025)
- TIME 100 Philanthropy (2026)

== Personal life ==
A graduate of Princeton University, Meck lives in New York City with his partner Bret.

Terrence, along with his late husband Rand, purchased the Raven resort in New Hope, PA in 2004.
