= Love Rocks NYC =

Festivals in New York City

- Genre: Rock and roll
- Dates: Annually, in March
- Locations: Beacon Theatre, New York City, NY United States
- Years active: 2017–present
- Founders: John Varvatos, Nicole Rechter and Greg Williamson
- Website: glwd.org

Love Rocks NYC is an annual benefit concert, first held in 2017, that benefits the non-profit God's Love We Deliver. The concert is held at the Beacon Theatre in New York City and was founded by menswear designer John Varvatos, Nicole Rechter and Greg Williamson.

== History ==
The annual concert was started in 2017 by Varvatos, Rechter and Williamson, who came up with the idea after speaking together at a fundraising dinner for God's Love We Deliver, of which Williamson is a board member. The concert raises money for the charity, which provides meals for those too sick to make, purchase or prepare meals themselves.

The concert features different Musicians and presenters every year. The house band, led by Will Lee with members Paul Shaffer, Eric Krasno, Larry Campbell, Steve Gadd and Shawn Pelton, plays every year.

The inaugural event was held at the Beacon Theatre on March 9, 2017.

As of June 2020 the event had raised $9 million in proceeds and had funded one million meals.

=== 2017 ===
The inaugural lineup included the following artists and presenters:

- Jackson Browne
- Joe Walsh
- Bruce Willis
- Sam Moore
- Anthony Hamilton
- Aaron Neville
- Mavis Staples
- Michael McDonald
- Bill Murray
- Susan Tedeschi
- Derek Trucks
- Warren Haynes
- CeCe Winans
- Gary Clark, Jr.

The 2017 festival raised $1.5million.

=== 2018 ===
The second show took place on March 15, 2018, and was hosted by Whoopi Goldberg.

Performers and presenters included:

- Bill Murray
- Norah Jones
- Emmylou Harris
- Ziggy Marley
- Patty Smyth
- Lucinda Williams
- Mavis Staples
- Marc Cohn
- Billy Gibbons
- Gary Clark Jr
- Donald Fagen
- Keith Richards

The 2018 festival raised $2million.

=== 2019 ===
The 2019 show took place on March 7, 2019, which coincided with the 34th anniversary of the founding of God's Love We Deliver. It was hosted by Bill Murray and Martin Short. Goldberg was also scheduled to host, but pulled out for health reasons.

The show featured presenters and artists like:

- Hozier
- Sheryl Crow
- Robert Plant
- Lukas Nelson
- Ann and Nancy Wilson of Heart
- Buddy Guy
- Bernie Williams

The 2019 festival raised $2.3million.

=== 2020 ===
The 4th annual Love Rocks NYC took place on March 12, 2020, as a restricted attendance-only event and all performances were live-streamed. The evening's emcees were Paul Shaffer and Tamara Tunie and late-night television host David Letterman made a surprise appearance.

The line-up included:

- Dave Matthews
- Chris and Rich Robinson of The Black Crowes
- Cyndi Lauper
- Jackson Browne
- Leon Bridges
- Warren Haynes
- Joss Stone
- Marcus King
- Susan Tedeschi
- Derek Trucks

The event raised $3million, all of which went to God's Love We Deliver, as expenses were underwritten by The Steven and Alexandra Cohen Foundation.

=== 2021 ===
The 5th annual show took place at the Beacon Theater on June 3, 2021, after being allowed by New York state and city regulations. The lineup included Sara Bareilles, Grace Potter, Jon Bon Jovi, Joe Bonamassa, Nathaniel Rateliff and Emily King. It was hosted by comedian Jeff Garlin, actor Michael Imperioli and former baseball player Bernie Williams, with special guests comedian, writer and actor Tina Fey.

=== 2022 ===
The 2022 Love Rocks concert took place on March 10, 2022, and featured Keith Richards, Jackson Browne, Warren Haynes, Hozier and David Shaw of The Revivalists. It was hosted by Murray, actor Laurence Fishburne and actors Steve Schirripa and Michelle Buteau from the television series The Sopranos. Browne, who has not billed before the show, appeared as a surprise guest.

=== 2023 ===
The 7th edition took place on March 9, 2023, at the Beacon Theater, continuing its support of the nonprofit God’s Love We Deliver. The event featured performances by James Taylor, Sheryl Crow, Pat Benatar, and Neil Giraldo, among others. Presenters included Stephen Colbert, Chevy Chase, and Andy Cohen. Proceeds benefited the charity’s mission to provide nutritious, medically tailored meals to individuals with severe illness.

=== 2024 ===
The 8th edition took place on March 7, 2024, at the Beacon Theater, in support of the concert series’ ongoing partnership with the nonprofit God’s Love We Deliver. Performers included Dave Grohl, The Black Keys, Hozier, Nile Rodgers, Tom Morello, Bettye LaVette, Don Felder, Joss Stone, Allison Russell, Emily King, Marcus King, Lucius, Larkin Poe, Trombone Shorty, Luke Spiller, Quinn Sullivan, and Bernie Williams. Comedians and television personalities Conan O’Brien, Tracy Morgan, Jim Gaffigan, Martin Short, and Bill Murray also appeared.

=== 2025 ===
The 9th edition took place on March 6, 2025, at the Beacon Theater, featuring headliners Trey Anastasio, Mavis Staples, and Peter Frampton. The event continued to raise funds for God's Love We Deliver with performances from Cher, Alicia Keys, and Beck, among other artists.
