= Ganga Stone =

American social activist (1941–2021)

Ganga Stone (October 30, 1941 – June 2, 2021) was a Cabrini Hospice volunteer who went on to found God's Love We Deliver with Jane Best when she realized the number of homebound AIDS patients that were unable to get meal delivery. She remained with the organization into 1994 and was sometimes called St. Ganga by the clients she served.

Stone was born Ingrid Hedley Stone and was raised in Long Island City, Queens and the Van Cortlandt area of The Bronx. She was the daughter of Hedley Stone (ne Moishe Chaim Stein), a Jewish immigrant from Warsaw, Poland, and Winifred, the daughter of Norwegian Lutheran immigrants. She was given the name Ganga, after the Ganges River, when she studied at an ashram in Ganeshpuri, India with Swami Muktananda and cited yoga as a long-term influence on her life.

Along with Peter Avitabile of Gay Men's Health Crisis, Stone is cited as one of the first individuals to realize the need for service organizations to address the AIDS epidemic. Stone's book, Start the Conversation was published by Grand Central in 1996.

Stone had a son named Clement Hill and a daughter named Hedley Stone. She died on June 2, 2021, in Saratoga Springs, New York, at age 79.
