= Ego Trip's The Big Playback =

Compilation album by Various artists
- Released: April 11, 2000
- Genre: Hip hop
- Length: 60:37
- Label: Rawkus
- Producers: Sacha Jenkins (exec.), Chairman Jefferson Mao (exec.), Elliot Wilson (exec.), Gabriel Alvarez (exec.),

Ego Trip's The Big Playback is a 2000 compilation album released by the American record label Rawkus Records on April 11, 2000. The album was released with the collaboration of the writers for Ego Trip magazine and made as a companion piece for Ego Trip's Book of Rap Lists. The album consists of rare and obscure tracks by hip hop artists and groups made between 1983 and 1989.

== Composition and release ==
The album was released with the collaboration of the writers for Ego Trip magazine and made as a companion piece for Ego Trip's Book of Rap Lists. The album consists of rare and obscure tracks from hip hop artists and groups originally released between 1983 and 1989 with many tracks that had previously not been released on compact disc. Many of the tracks have been described historically important with many tracks being sampled by more famous hip hop artists on tracks like "Holy War (Live)" by Divine Force (used by DJ Premier on a Jeru the Damaja song) and "Get Retarded" by MC EZ & Troup (used by Dr. Dre on "Zoom" from the Bulworth soundtrack).

Ego Trip's The Big Playback was released by Rawkus Records on April 11, 2000. The album was released on vinyl, cassette and compact disc.

== Reception ==
Professional ratings
Review scores
Source	Rating
AllMusic	4.5/5 stars
Alternative Press	4/5
Melody Maker	3/5 stars
Spin	7/10

From contemporary reviews, Nathan Rabin of The A.V. Club noted that the album "offers ample evidence that there's more to '80s hip-hop than you'll find on most old-school compilations. Perhaps the old school's greatest virtue was its artistic freedom: Unencumbered by convention, hip-hop's pioneers made up the rules as they went along, giving their music an unpredictable, exuberant, spontaneous quality that The Big Playback captures for posterity. AllMusic gave the album four and a half stars as "required listening for readers of the book" and "Even for fans who aren't interested in a book of rap lists, Ego Trip's The Big Playback is a stellar compilation". Sasha Frere-Jones of Spin noted that "as the organising principle is rarity, not quality" and the tracks by Lord Shafiyq and MC Mitchski will "only be manna for ageing B-boys." but that overall praised the album, stating that it was "proof that the current indie boom isn't the first time hip-hop was local, weird or free."

== Track listing ==
Credits adapted from the liner notes of the album.

1. Divine Force – "Holy War (Live)" (Sir Ibu)
2. Lord Shaifiyq – "My Mic is on Fire" (G. Parks)
3. Marley Marl featuring MC Shan – "Marley Marl Scratch" (M. Williams, S. Moltke)
4. MC EZ & Troup – "Get Retarded" (C. Mack)
5. Grandmaster Caz – "Get Down Grandmaster" (C. Fisher, C. Miller)
6. Positive K – Step Up Front (D. Gibson)
7. Latee – "This Cut's Got Flavor" (D. French, M. James)
8. The Bizzie Boyz – "Droppin' It" (D. Mitchell, A. Heard, D. Willis)
9. Ultimate Force – "I'm Not Playing" (J. Kirkland, R. Raymon)
10. The Alliance – "Do It! Do It!" (F. Byrd)
11. MC Mitchski – "Brooklyn Blew Up the Bridge" (M. Dudley, J. Dudley)
12. Rammelzee vs. K-Rob – "Beat Bop" (S. Bunch, A. Diaz, M. Johnson, S. Piccarello)
