= Ego Trip (magazine) =

Hip-hop magazine

- Cover of the final issue
- Categories: Music magazine
- Founder: Elliott Wilson; Sacha Jenkins
- First issue: 1994; 31 years ago
- Final issue: 1998; 27 years ago
- Country: United States
- Based in: New York City
- Language: English

Ego Trip was a hip hop magazine started in New York City in 1994. It lasted four years and 13 issues and distinguished itself based on its irreverence and defiant attitude, eventually adopting the tagline, "the arrogant voice of musical truth."

== Description ==
The roots of the publication began with a hip hop newspaper called Beat-Down Newspaper, founded by Haji Akhigbade and Sacha Jenkins in 1992. Sacha and Haji met and brought aboard both Elliott Wilson and later Jefferson "Chairman" Mao. All three (Jenkins, Wilson, and Mao) also had extensive freelance backgrounds writing for other publications such as Rap Pages, Vibe and URB. Technically, Jenkins and Wilson founded Ego Trip (with photographer/documentarian Henry Chalfant given honorary status as co-founder as well), though Mao was a part of the staff from the first issue and eventually became editor-in-chief after Jenkins left to become music editor at Vibe. Likewise, the fourth core member, Gabriel Alvarez, was formerly an editor at the Los Angeles-based Rap Pages until Ego Trip recruited him, eventually making him managing editor. The last core member was designer Brent Rollins who joined the magazine in their third year and took over as art director.

Ego Trip covered a range of so-called "underground" scenes, including skateboarders and punk/indie rockers before those scenes became as commonplace as they are today. However, it was most identified as a hip hop magazine.

== Covers ==
The 13 issues featured the following rap artists on the cover:

- Vol. 1, Issue 1 (1994): Nas
- Vol. 1, Issue 2: Method Man
- Vol. 1, Issue 3: Smif-N-Wessun
- Vol. 2, Issue 1 (1995): Eazy-E
- Vol. 2, Issue 2: Cypress Hill
- Vol. 2, Issue 3: KRS-One
- Vol. 2, Issue 4: A Tribe Called Quest, De La Soul, Large Professor
- Vol. 2, Issue 5: Wu-Tang/Ghostface Killah
- Vol. 2, Issue 6: Redman
- Vol. 3, Issue 1 (1997): Biggie Smalls
- Vol. 3, Issue 2: Rakim
- Vol. 3, Issue 3: Gang Starr
- Vol. 4, Issue 1 (1998): Def Squad

== Post-Ego Trip ==
After closing the magazine, the Ego Trip team (Jenkins, Wilson, Mao, Alvarez and Rollins) continued on to a series of multimedia projects, such as the old-school rap music compilation The Big Playback (Rawkus Records, 2000), inspired by their first book, Ego Trip's Book of Rap Lists (St. Martin's Press, 1999). Their second book Ego Trip's Big Book of Racism! (Regan Books, 2002) spawned a relationship with the VH1 cable network. The staff have written and produced three television shows for the cable network, including "TV's Illest Minority Moments presented by Ego Trip," the three-part "Ego Trip's Race-O-Rama!", Ego Trip's The (White) Rapper Show, and Ego Trip's Miss Rap Supreme. 'Ego Trip' is currently authoring a book on the history of white rappers.

== Books ==
- ego trip's Book of Rap Lists by Sacha Jenkins, Elliott Wilson, Chairman Jefferson Mao, Gabriel Alvarez and Brent Rollins (1999, St. Martin's Griffin; ISBN 0-312-24298-0)
- ego trip's Big Book of Racism! by Sacha Jenkins, Elliott Wilson, Chairman Jefferson Mao, Gabriel Alvarez and Brent Rollins (2002, ReganBooks; ISBN 0-06-098896-7)
