= Ego Trip's The (White) Rapper Show =

American reality television series

- Created by: Ego Trip
- Directed by: Mike L. Taylor
- Starring: MC Serch
- Country of origin: United States
- Original language: English
- No. of seasons: 1
- No. of episodes: 8

Production
- Executive producers: Sacha Jenkins, Elliott Wilson, Chairman Jefferson Mao, Gabriel Alvarez, Brent Rollins
- Producer: Ken Mok / 10x10 entertainment
- Running time: 60 minutes

Original release
- Network: VH1
- Release: January 8 – February 26, 2007

Ego Trip's The (White) Rapper Show is an American reality television series created by Ego Trip magazine that first aired on VH1. In the show, ten white rappers compete with each other for the chance at a $100,000 grand prize. The show is based in the South Bronx, with MC Serch (from the group 3rd Bass) serving as the host. At the end of each show, one rapper was eliminated.

Each episode followed a different theme in hip hop culture and music, evolving the contestants from wannabe white rappers to full-fledged and multi-faceted hip hop acts.

== Episode Progress ==
Cast

Rank	Contestants	1	2	3	4	5	6	7	8
1	$hamrock	WIN	WIN	LOW	LOW	WIN	SAFE	SAFE	WIN
2	John Brown	LOW	LOW	SAFE	WIN	LOW	SAFE	LOW	ELIM
3	Jus Rhyme	WIN	WIN	SAFE	WIN	WIN	LOW	ELIM	
4	Persia	WIN	LOW	SAFE	WIN	WIN	ELIM		
5	Jon Boy	LOW	WIN	SAFE	WIN	ELIM			
6	Sullee	WIN	LOW	LOW	LOW	QUIT			
7	100 Proof	LOW	SAFE	LOW	ELIM				
8	G-Child	WIN	WIN	ELIM					
9	Misfit	LOW	ELIM						
10	Dasit	ELIM							

The contestant won the competition
The contestant was the runner-up.
The contestant was safe.
The contestant won the challenge but put up for elimination.
The contestant was eliminated
The contestant won the challenge.
The contestant was up for elimination.
The contestant quit the competition.
