= Downtown Science (Downtown Science album) =

Studio album by Downtown Science
- Released: 1991
- Recorded: 1990
- Studios: Chung King, New York City; Apollo, New York City; Sigma Sound, New York City; Nightmare Productions, New York City
- Genre: Rap
- Length: 61:31
- Labels: Def Jam; Columbia; Sony Music
- Producers: Bosco Money (also exec.); Sam Sever (also exec.)

Singles from Downtown Science
- 1. "Room to Breathe" Released: 1991; 2. "Radioactive" Released: 1991

Downtown Science is the only studio album by American rap duo Downtown Science. It was released in 1991 through Def Jam Recordings/Columbia Records/Sony Music Entertainment. The recording sessions took place in New York City at Chung King Studios, Apollo Studios, Sigma Sound Studios, and Nightmare Productions, Inc. The album was produced by members Bosco Money and Sam Sever, who also served as executive producers.

Two singles were released: "Room to Breathe" and "Radioactive". The duo supported the album by opening for Big Audio Dynamite II on a North American tour.

== Critical reception ==
Professional ratings
Review scores
Source	Rating
AllMusic	4/5 stars
MusicHound R&B: The Essential Album Guide	3/5 stars
RapReviews	7.5/10
The Village Voice	A−

The Baltimore Sun noted that "Sam Sever and Bosco Money treat their sampled sound bites the way an arranger would treat individual instruments, painstakingly orchestrating each rap until it begins to articulate a definable sense of mood and dynamics." The Washington Post opined that the "lack of lurid sex-and-violence posturing is refreshing, but Money's raps are often bland and banal instead."

== Track listing ==
No.	Title	Writer(s)	Length
1.	"This Is a Visit"	K. Carabello; S. Citrin; P. Townshend
2.	"Catch the Wave"	K. Carabello; S. Citrin; A. Toussaint
3.	"Radioactive"	K. Carabello; S. Citrin
4.	"Out There But in There"	K. Carabello; S. Citrin
5.	"Natural People"	K. Carabello; S. Citrin; A. MacDermot; J. Ragni; J. Radomski
6.	"Somethin' Spankin New"	K. Carabello; S. Citrin
7.	"If I Was"	K. Carabello; S. Citrin; J. Brown
8.	"Drums Through the Wall"	K. Carabello; S. Citrin
9.	"Delta Sigma"	K. Carabello; S. Citrin
10.	"The Topic Drift"	K. Carabello
11.	"Down to a Science"	K. Carabello; S. Citrin; B. Maupin; B. Summers; D. McKnight; M. Clark; P. Jackson
12.	"Summertime"	K. Carabello
13.	"Saw You at the Party"	K. Carabello; S. Citrin
14.	"Room to Breathe"	K. Carabello; S. Citrin
15.	"Winning"	K. Carabello; S. Citrin
16.	"Fat Shout"	K. Carabello
17.	"Keep It On"	K. Carabello; S. Citrin; J. Brown; B. Hobgood

== Personnel ==
- Kenneth Carabello – main artist, vocals, producer, executive producer
- Sam Citrin – main artist, producer, executive producer
- Kevin Reynolds – recording & mixing
- Adam Gazzola – recording & mixing
- Warren Shaw – recording
- Michael Baksh – photography
