= The Cactus Album =

1989 debut album by hip-hop trio 3rd Bass

Studio album by 3rd Bass
- Released: November 14, 1989
- Recorded: 1988–1989
- Studios: Chung King, Greene Street, Island Media, New York City
- Genre: Hip hop
- Length: 65:46
- Labels: Def Jam; Columbia
- Producers: Pete Nice, MC Serch, Sam Sever, Prince Paul, the Bomb Squad (Hank Shocklee, Keith Shocklee, Eric "Vietnam" Sadler)

3rd Bass chronology
The Cactus Album (1989)	The Cactus Revisited (1990)

The Cactus Al/Bum (also known as The Cactus Cee/D and The Cactus Cas/Ette depending on release format) is the debut album by hip hop trio 3rd Bass, released on Def Jam Recordings on November 14, 1989. The album received positive reviews from the hip hop press and is also notable for featuring the recording debut of rapper Zev Love X of KMD, later known as MF Doom, on "The Gas Face". It was certified gold by the RIAA on April 24, 1990.

The Cactus Album peaked at No. 5 on Billboard's Top Hip Hop/R&B Albums chart and at No. 55 on the Billboard 200 chart. In 1998, the album was selected as one of The Source's "100 Best Rap Albums". A decade later, Rhapsody included The Cactus Album in its list of "The 10 Best Albums by White Rappers".

== Background ==
Most of the music was produced by Sam Sever, alongside members MC Serch and Pete Nice, except for the Prince Paul-produced tracks "The Gas Face" and "Brooklyn-Queens," and "Steppin' to the A.M." and "Oval Office" by the Bomb Squad. The album generally features songs that are either lyrical showcases or are about women, such as the hidden sexual meaning of "Oval Office". The song "Sons of 3rd Bass" can be viewed as a diss to the Beastie Boys – who had recently severed ties with 3rd Bass' record label, Def Jam – in that it references them in many lines, such as one line uttered by MC Serch in the first verse.

Swarm to the lyrics 'cause Serch is your father
Screaming "Hey Ladies", why bother?

The song "Wordz of Wisdom" was recorded under the name Three the Hard Way. The group's name was changed after they signed to Def Jam; however, the recording still made its way onto the album.

The group had a minor hit with the single "The Gas Face". The accompanying music video, which featured a bevy of humorous cameo appearances that included Gilbert Gottfried, Flavor Flav, Salt-n-Pepa, and EPMD, garnered MTV airplay. The song also features Daniel Dumile in his recording debut. At the time, he was recording under the alias Zev Love X and was a member of the rap trio KMD, but he would later come to be known as MF Doom. KMD were mentioned several times on the album, and they appeared in the music videos for "The Gas Face" and "Steppin' to the A.M."

== Critical reception ==
Professional ratings
Review scores
Source	Rating
AllMusic	5/5 stars
Chicago Tribune	3/4 stars
Los Angeles Times	3/4 stars
NME	8/10
The Philadelphia Inquirer	4/4 stars
Q	4/5 stars
Record Mirror	5/5
The Rolling Stone Album Guide	4.5/5 stars
Select	4/5
The Village Voice	A−

The Orange County Register concluded that "credit has to go to 3rd Bass' all-star lineup of producers—Prince Paul (Stetsasonic), Hank Shocklee, Eric Sadler, Sam Sever—who makes sure the twosome's rhymes are blade sharp (if repetitive in parts) and the beats are brick heavy."

== Track listing ==
All tracks are written by Pete Nice (Nash), MC Serch (Berrin), and Sam Sever (Citrin).

No.	Title	Length
1.	"Stymie's Theme"	0:13
2.	"Sons of 3rd Bass"	4:46
3.	"Russell Rush"	0:24
4.	"The Gas Face" (Berrin/Daniel Dumile/Paul Huston/Nash)	3:49
5.	"Monte Hall"	5:26
6.	"Oval Office" (Berrin/Nash/Eric Sadler/Hank Shocklee/Keith Shocklee)	3:32
7.	"Hoods"	0:17
8.	"Soul in the Hole"	3:49
9.	"Triple Stage Darkness"	4:10
10.	"M.C. Disagree"	0:44
11.	"Wordz of Wisdom"	6:31
12.	"Product of the Environment"	6:16
13.	"Desert Boots"	0:21
14.	"The Cactus"	4:40
15.	"Jim Backus"	0:03
16.	"Flippin' Off the Wall Like Lucy Ball"	3:16
17.	"Brooklyn-Queens" (Berrin/Nash/Huston)	3:37
18.	"Steppin' to the A.M." (Berrin/Nash/Sadler/H. Shocklee/K. Shocklee)	4:50
19.	"Episode #3"	0:11
20.	"Who's on Third"	0:59
21.	"Wordz of Wisdom (Remix)"	7:56

2000 CD Release Bonus Track

No.	Title	Length
22.	"Brooklyn-Queens [UK Power Mix]"	5:31

== Singles ==
- "Steppin' to the A.M."
- "The Gas Face"
- "Brooklyn-Queens"
- "Product of the Environment"

=== Charting singles ===
Year	Title	Chart positions			
Year	Title	Rap; Singles	R&B/Hip-Hop; Singles & Tracks	Dance Music; Maxi-Singles Sales	Dance Music; Club Play
1989	"Steppin' to the A.M."	5	54	50	—
1990	"The Gas Face"	5	—	31	—
1990	"Brooklyn-Queens"	—	—	—	20

== The Cactus Vidie/Yo ==
The Cactus Vidie/Yo

Video by 3rd Bass
- Released: 1990
- Genre: Hip-hop
- Length: 17:00 (Approximately)
- Label: Def Jam/Columbia
- Director: Lionel C. Martin

The Cactus Vidie/Yo is a collection of 3rd Bass music videos, released in 1991. The set, which was distributed by Columbia Music Video, contained music videos of the album's singles as well as short skits featuring Gilbert Gottfried that appeared between the selections. The "Wordz of Wisdom" and "Triple Stage Darkness" videos were not full-length and only contained the first couple verses of the song. The collection was only released on VHS.

The videos featured are as follows:

1. Steppin' to the A.M.
2. Wordz of Wizdom (Just a Liddle Somethin)
3. The Gas Face
4. Triple Stage Darkness (Give Em A Taste)
5. Brooklyn-Queens

== Personnel ==
3rd Bass

- Pete Nice – Producer, Performer
- MC Serch – Producer, Performer
- DJ White Knight – Performer (Uncredited)
- DJ Richie Rich – Performer (Live only)

Guest performer

- Zev Love X – Performer on "The Gas Face"

Production

- Prince Paul - Producer
- The Bomb Squad (Eric "Vietnam" Sadler, Hank Shocklee, Keith Shocklee) – Producer
- Sam "Sever" Citrin – Producer

Technical Staff/Artwork

- Steven Ett – Editing
- Adam Gazzola – Editing
- Kevin Reynolds – Engineer
- Nick Sansano – Engineer
- Chuck Valle – Engineer
- Bruce Buchalter – Engineer
- Curt Frasca – Mixing, Engineer
- Greg Gordon – Engineer
- Mark Mendelbaum – Engineer
- Howard Zucker – Art Direction, Design
- Cey Adams – Design, Logo Design
