= Derelicts of Dialect =

Studio album by 3rd Bass
- Released: June 14, 1991
- Recorded: October 1990 – May 1991
- Studios: Chung King, Greene Street, Calliope, New York City
- Genre: Hip hop
- Length: 82:11
- Labels: Def Jam; Columbia
- Producers: 3rd Bass; Prince Paul; Sam Sever; John Gamble; Geeby Dajani; Dante Ross; KMD

3rd Bass chronology
The Cactus Album (1989)	Derelicts of Dialect (1991)

Singles from Derelicts of Dialect
- 1. "Pop Goes the Weasel" Released: May 1, 1991; 2. "3rd Bass Theme a.k.a. Portrait of the Artist as a Hood" Released: October 10, 1991

Professional ratings
Review scores
Source	Rating
AllMusic	3/5 stars
Entertainment Weekly	B
Rolling Stone	3/5 stars

Derelicts of Dialect is the second and final studio album by New York hip hop trio 3rd Bass. It was released on June 14, 1991, through Def Jam Recordings. The recording sessions took place at Chung King Studios, Greene St. Recording, and Calliope Studios, in New York City, from October 1990 to May 1991. The album was produced by 3rd Bass, Prince Paul, Sam Sever of Downtown Science, John Gamble, Dante Ross and Geeby Dajani of Stimulated Dummies, and KMD. It features guest appearances from Chubb Rock, KMD, Nice & Smooth.

The album is considered to be a critical success (explicitly not aimed toward a mainstream market), and gained publicity by featuring the surprise mainstream hit "Pop Goes the Weasel", a diss track towards Vanilla Ice. The music video features former Black Flag frontman Henry Rollins as Ice. X Clan is dissed on songs such as "Herbalz in Your Mouth".

The album is noted for its variety of styles (both musically and lyrically), and demonstrates influences ranging from De La Soul to A Tribe Called Quest (both members of the then-flourishing Native Tongues movement). Several anecdotes and skits on the album are influenced by 3 Feet High and Rising.

Derelicts of Dialect peaked at number 19 in the United States, at number 46 in the UK, and was certified gold by the Recording Industry Association of America on September 17, 1991.

== Track listing ==
No.	Title	Writer(s)	Producer(s)	Length
1.	"The Merchant of Grooves"	P. Nash; M. Berrin	3rd Bass	1:37
2.	"Derelicts of Dialect"	P. Nash; M. Berrin; P. Huston; H. Anadon; J. Burrise	3rd Bass; Prince Paul	4:10
3.	"Ace in the Hole" (featuring KMD)	P. Nash; M. Berrin; A. Hodge; D. Dumile	KMD; 3rd Bass (co.)	3:39
4.	"French Toast"	P. Nash; M. Berrin; R. Lawson; S. Citrin	3rd Bass; Sam Sever	0:49
5.	"Portrait of the Artist as a Hood"	P. Nash; M. Berrin; S. Citrin	3rd Bass; Sam Sever	4:29
6.	"Pop Goes the Weasel"	P. Nash; M. Berrin; D. Ross; J. Gamble; J. Dajani; G. Beauchamp; H. Fuqua; S. Wonder	3rd Bass; Stimulated Dummies	3:55
7.	"Sea Vessel Soliloquy"	P. Nash; M. Berrin; R. Lawson	3rd Bass	0:40
8.	"Daddy Rich in the Land of 1210"	P. Nash; M. Berrin; R. Lawson; C. Hodges; D. Carter; O. Wright	DJ Richie Rich	3:12
9.	"Word to the Third"	P. Nash; M. Berrin; S. Citrin; G. Bartz	3rd Bass; Sam Sever	5:02
10.	"Herbalz in Your Mouth"	P. Nash; M. Berrin; P. Huston; R. Zimmerman	Prince Paul; 3rd Bass (co.)	4:20
11.	"Al'z A-B-Cee'z"	P. Nash; M. Berrin; A. Bryan; P. Breitenfeld	3rd Bass	1:51
12.	"No Master Plan No Master Race"	P. Nash; M. Berrin; S. Citrin	3rd Bass; Sam Sever	4:47
13.	"Come In"	P. Nash; M. Berrin; P. Huston; J. Moore	Prince Paul; 3rd Bass (co.)	3:07
14.	"No Static at All"	P. Nash; M. Berrin; P. Huston; T. McCall	Prince Paul; 3rd Bass (co.)	3:44
15.	"Eye Jammie"	P. Nash; M. Berrin; S. Citrin	3rd Bass	1:05
16.	"Microphone Techniques" (featuring Nice & Smooth)	P. Nash; M. Berrin; D. Barnes; G. Mays; S. Citrin; A. Green	3rd Bass; Sam Sever	4:59
17.	"Problem Child"	P. Nash; M. Berrin; S. Citrin; D. Roeser	3rd Bass; Sam Sever	4:30
18.	"3 Strikes 5000"	P. Nash; M. Berrin; R. Lawson; D. Ross; J. Gamble; J. Dajani	3rd Bass; Stimulated Dummies	4:03
19.	"Kick Em in the Grill" (featuring Chubb Rock)	P. Nash; M. Berrin; R. Simpson; D. Ross; J. Gamble; J. Dajani	Stimulated Dummies	2:37
20.	"Green Eggs and Swine"	P. Nash; M. Berrin; P. Huston	3rd Bass; Prince Paul	4:45
21.	"Derelicts of Dialect" (SD50 Remix)	P. Nash; M. Berrin; H. Anadon; J. Burrise	3rd Bass; Prince Paul	4:13
22.	"Pop Goes the Weasel" (Radio Edit)	P. Nash; M. Berrin; D. Ross; J. Gamble; J. Dajani	3rd Bass; Dante Ross (co.); John Gamble (co.); Geeby Dajani (co.)	3:47
23.	"M.C. Disagree and the Re-Animator" (CD only)	D. Kealy; J. Mertz		0:49
24.	"Check Yourself" (LP only)
Total length:				82:11

== Personnel ==
- Michael Berrin – vocals, producer, percussion
- Peter Nash – vocals, producer, accordion
- Richard Lawson – scratches, producer
- KMD – featured artist & producer (track 3)
- Richard Simpson – featured artist (track 19)
- Greg Mays – featured artist (track 16)
- Darryl Barnes – featured artist (track 16)
- John Gamble – producer, engineering, remixing
- Dante Ross – producer, remixing
- John Dajani – producer, remixing
- Paul Huston – producer, cymbals
- Sam Citrin – producer, percussion
- Christopher Shaw – engineering, keyboards
- Allen Title – saxophone, horns
- Kevin Reynolds – engineering
- Mike Teelucksingh – engineering
- Howie Weinberg – mastering
- Michael Lavine – photography

== Charts ==
=== Weekly charts ===
Chart (1991)	Peak position
Australian Albums (ARIA)	118
UK Albums (Official Charts)	46
US Billboard 200	19
US Top R&B/Hip-Hop Albums (Billboard)	10

=== Year-end charts ===
Chart (1991)	Position
US Top R&B/Hip-Hop Albums (Billboard)	76

== Certifications ==
Region	Certification	Certified units/sales
United States (RIAA)	Gold	500,000^{^}
^{^} Shipments figures based on certification alone.
