= God's Love We Deliver =

American charitable organization

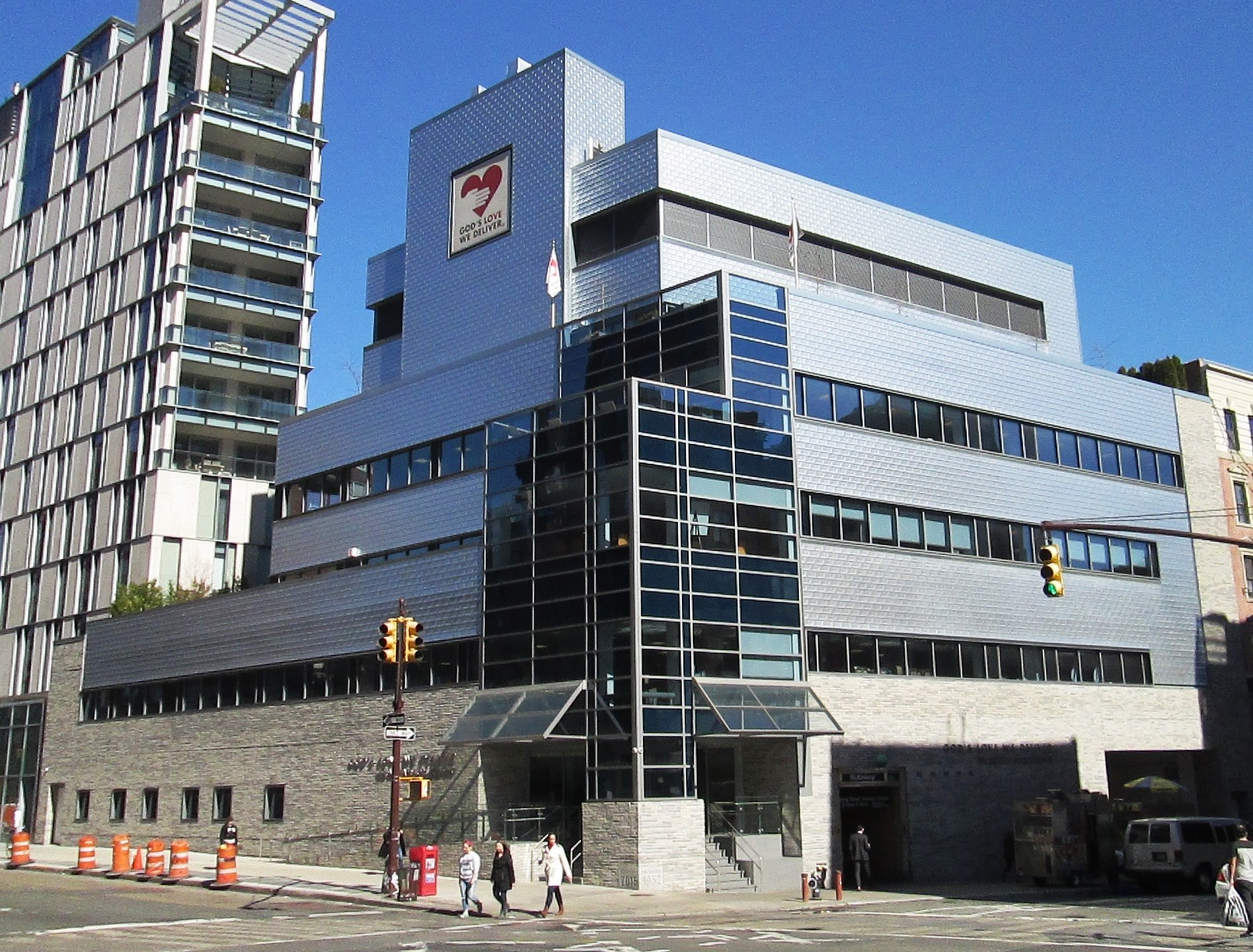
- Formation: 1985; 41 years ago
- Founder: Ganga Stone
- Founded at: West-Park Presbyterian Church
- Purpose: Prepare and deliver meals to ill New York City residents
- Headquarters: 166 Avenue of the Americas; Manhattan, New York City
- Region served: New York City
- President & CEO: Terrence Meck
- Budget: $23 million (2021)
- Volunteers: 20,000 annually
- Website: www.glwd.org

God's Love We Deliver (GLWD) is an American charity that delivers medically tailored meals to people who cannot feed themselves due to illness. It was founded in 1985 and is based in New York City. Despite its name, the organization is non-sectarian.

God's Love We Deliver volunteers prepare and deliver meals to ill New York City residents; the organization serves over 15,000 clients per year. As of 2025, GLWD had delivered over 40 million meals in New York City, over the course of 40 years. The organization raises funds for its operations through a variety of means, including celebrity-endorsed fundraisers and benefits.

== History ==
The organization stems from a visit made by Ganga Stone (1941–2021), a hospice volunteer, to an AIDS patient in 1985. She recognized the difficulty that the sick had in obtaining and preparing food which led to her co-founding GLWD with her roommate Jane Best. In the early days of the organization, Best and Stone delivered a few meals per day by bicycle. By 1993, GLWD was serving two meals a day to 550 clients.

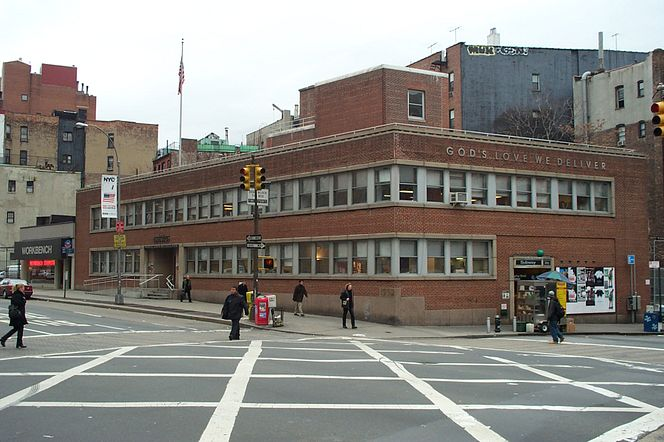
God's Love headquarters, prior to 2015 renovations

In December 1995—on World AIDS Day—the organization moved into its own home, at 166 Avenue of the Americas in Manhattan. It had previously rented kitchen space in the American Youth Hostel at Amsterdam and 103rd Street. The building went through considerable renovations in 2015 to reflect the organization's rapid growth, including one of the largest commercial kitchens in New York City.

== Services ==
In 2001, the organization expanded its mission to serve ill clients with conditions beyond HIV/AIDS.

In 2021, God's Love We Deliver budgeted for distributing 2.5 million meals to 10,000 New Yorkers who were homebound with various ailments.

As of November 2025, the organization is serving 80,000 meals every week to clients, their caregivers, and dependents. They are projected to deliver more than 4 million meals in 2026. Registered Dietitians work with clients to develop a unique meal plan to accommodate their diagnoses. Their client population includes over 200 diagnoses and a majority of clients live with more than one ailment. Their facility at 166 Avenue of the Americas operates a nearly 10,000 sq. ft. state-of-the-art commercial kitchen and bakery. It also operates its own delivery operations and a fulfillment center pack-out area with a covered loading dock. They frequently work with local businesses and school groups on volunteer opportunities, accommodating over 670 volunteer groups in 2023.

The organization continually works to enhance its services and programs to meet their clients’ and the community’s needs. In 2022 they launched their pregnancy and postpartum health program, Healthy Starts, and in 2024, they added sickle cell disease as a qualifying diagnosis.

== See also ==
- Citymeals-on-Wheels
- City Harvest
- Food Bank For New York City
