= 3rd Bass =

American hip hop group

- Left to right: MC Serch, Pete Nice, & DJ Richie Rich in 1990.

Background information
- Also known as: 3 The Hard Way
- Origin: New York City, U.S.
- Genre: Hip-hop
- Years active: 1985–1994; 1998–2000; 2013; 2024-Current
- Labels: Def Jam; Columbia; CBS
- Past members: MC Serch; Pete Nice; DJ Richie Rich

3rd Bass is an American hip-hop group that was most active in the late 1980s and early 1990s. Formed by MC Serch, Pete Nice, and DJ Richie Rich, the group was notable for being one of the first successful interracial hip-hop acts. Along with the Beastie Boys and producer Rick Rubin, MC Serch and Pete Nice were two of the very few white hip-hop artists who were widely respected in the community. The group dissolved in 1994, but had short-lived reunions in 2000 and 2013. The group released two studio albums in their initial career and both of them were certified gold by the RIAA.

== Career ==
MC Serch (Michael Berrin), Prime Minister Pete Nice (Peter J. Nash), and DJ Richie Rich (Richard Lawson) were the three founding members of the group. Richie Rich was a local D.J., while Nice was an English major at Columbia University and hosted a hip-hop show on Columbia's student radio station, WKCR-FM. Serch performed at clubs and block parties, and released a single called "Hey Boy" (b/w "Beware of the Death") on independent label Idlers.

The two first performed as '3 the Hard Way', a name referred to in the song "Wordz of Wisdom" but later redubbed themselves '3rd Bass' before recording their first album. Sam Sever, Prince Paul, and the Bomb Squad produced their 1989 debut, The Cactus Album, a critically acclaimed LP that went gold and contained a minor hit in "The Gas Face." The accompanying video, which featured a bevy of humorous cameo appearances that included a then-unknown MF Doom, DJ Subroc, Gilbert Gottfried, Flavor Flav, Salt-n-Pepa, Kid 'N Play and EPMD, garnered respectable MTV airplay and the single peaked at #5 on Billboard's Top Rap Singles, though it did not chart on the Billboard Hot 100. The video also contained insults aimed at rapper MC Hammer, Public Enemy member Professor Griff and record executive Lyor Cohen.

As reported in many interviews, Serch had tried (unsuccessfully) to join up with fellow New Yorkers the Beastie Boys. Upon signing with Def Jam, 3rd Bass inherited their label's feud with the Beasties. The Cactus Album was released shortly after the Beastie Boys—riding high on the success of Licensed to Ill—walked out of their contract with the label. In addition to containing multiple potshots directed at M.C. Hammer (referred to as "M.C. Household Tool" in the liner notes), Cactus also attacked the Beastie Boys and their defection to Capitol Records in the song "Sons of 3rd Bass."

3rd Bass's 1991 follow-up, Derelicts of Dialect, had a new target in fellow white rapper Vanilla Ice, who was the focal point of several tracks on the album, most notably "Pop Goes the Weasel". The track depicted Ice as a culture thief who watered down the sound of rap in order to pander to a mainstream audience, while depicting 3rd Bass as more respectful of the genre's traditions. Ice was also criticized for his refusal to credit artists whose music he had sampled for his 1990 smash "Ice Ice Baby." The video featured punk rock icon Henry Rollins dressed up as Ice, who received a "beatdown" by 3rd Bass at the end.

Fueled by the heavy backlash against Vanilla Ice at the time of its release, "Pop Goes the Weasel" reached #1 on Billboard's Top Rap Singles chart, gave the group their only Top 30 single (peaking at #29 on the Hot 100), and helped propel the album to gold status. The track was described by Allmusic as "much-needed damage control in the hip-hop community," in part because it featured Caucasian rappers openly distancing themselves from one of their peers. Vanilla Ice answered back with 'The Wrath' and 'Hit 'em Hard' which he played at concerts in 1992, though the songs were not officially released until 1994.

3rd Bass's final collaboration was the title track to the soundtrack of the 1992 film Gladiator before the group called it quits. That same year—three years after The Cactus Album—the Beastie Boys retaliated against 3rd Bass on Check Your Head; the track "Professor Booty" contained the lyric "dancing around like you think you're Janet Jackson," which was interpreted as a swipe at Serch's dancing in 3rd Bass's videos.

== Breakup ==
In 1992, Serch co-wrote and produced several tracks for Detroit rapper Boss's only album, Born Gangstaz. He released a solo record, Return of the Product, in August of that year, which included the second major label recording of Nas (credited in the liner notes as "Nasty Nas") and featured the single "Back To The Grill Again." Meanwhile, Nice and Rich teamed up as Prime Minister Pete Nice & Daddy Rich, and released their only album, Dust to Dust in 1993. The leadoff single, "Rat Bastard," contained voice samples from The Silence of the Lambs and was rumored to reflect bad blood between the pair and Serch, though it was not confirmed. The follow-up was "Kick the Bobo," which received light airplay on MTV and BET but was unable to become a sizeable hit. Neither Nice nor Serch were able to achieve much popularity on their own after 3rd Bass disbanded.

Around the time of the split, Serch was involved with the production of the movie Zebrahead. As recalled by actor Michael Rapaport, Serch originally wanted to star in the film but was unable to secure the role, and ended up producing the film's soundtrack instead. After serving a stint at now-defunct Wild Pitch Records, he founded Serchlite, a record label and publishing company responsible for signing another group of white New York hip-hop artists, Non Phixion (who broke up in 2006).

3rd Bass reunited for a gig at the birthday party of Andy Hilfiger (brother of Tommy Hilfiger) in 1998. They also performed at Woodstock 1999, and released a non-charting single, "Hail to the Chief." There had also been talks of a new album entitled Ichabod's Cranium, but any long-term reunion and album plans were ultimately scrapped.

Nice retired from the music business and opened a baseball memorabilia store in Cooperstown, New York. He published a book, Baseball Legends of Brooklyn's Green-Wood Cemetery, under his real name in 2003, in addition to attempting to secure property for an official gravesite of Negro league players. Serch hosted the VH1 reality TV series Ego Trip's The White Rapper Show. Nash also produced a documentary about the Rooters, with interviews filmed in an old gas station in Cooperstown that he was turning into a museum of baseball fan history stocked with much of the memorabilia he was gathering. In 2007 Nice, along with Dropkick Murphys member Ken Casey, opened McGreevy's 3rd Base Saloon, a baseball history-themed sports bar, in Boston in April 2008. In 2009 MC Serch was featured on rapper Kurious's album II and music video by Amalgam Digital.

On April 6, 2013, MC Serch announced on Facebook that 3rd Bass would reunite after over 20 years to tour in celebration of The Cactus Album's 25th anniversary. However, they only did two shows that year: a reunion show at a club in Brooklyn in July, and a cameo appearance on Labor Day at a festival in Indianapolis.

On November 8, 2024, the group performed together for the first time in 11 years at WBLS' 50th anniversary concert. A 2025 North American tour has been announced.

On August 16 & 17, 2025 3rd Bass reunited to perform at the Beatstock music festival in New York and New Jersey.

== Discography ==
=== Studio albums ===
List of studio albums, with selected chart positions and certifications
Title	Album details	Peak chart positions					Certifications
Title	Album details	US	US R&B /HH	AUS	NZ	UK	Certifications
The Cactus Album	Released: November 10, 1989; Label: Def Jam/Columbia; Formats: CD, LP, Cassette, digital download, streaming	55	5	—	24	—	RIAA: Gold
Derelicts of Dialect	Released: June 14, 1991; Label: Def Jam/Columbia; Formats: CD, LP, Cassette, digital download, streaming	19	10	118	—	46	RIAA: Gold
"—" denotes a recording that did not chart or was not released in that territory.

=== Singles ===
==== As lead artist ====
List of singles, with selected chart positions and certifications, showing year released and album name
Title	Year	Peak chart positions							Certifications	Album
Title	Year	US	US Dance	US R&B	US Rap	AUS	NZ	UK	Certifications	Album
"Steppin' to the A.M."	1989	—	— (Note: "Steppin' to the A.M." did not enter the Dance Club Songs, but peaked at number 50 on the Hot Dance Music/Maxi-Singles Sales.)	54	5	—	—	95		The Cactus Album
"The Gas Face" (featuring Zev Love X)	1990	—	25	29	5	—	33	71		The Cactus Album
"Brooklyn-Queens"	1990	—	20	82	—	—	39	61		The Cactus Album
"Product of the Environment (Project Remix)"	1990	—	—	—	—	—	—	—		The Cactus Album
"Pop Goes the Weasel"	1991	29	28	26	1	122	17	64	RIAA: Gold	Derelicts of Dialect
"3rd Bass Theme a.k.a. Portrait of the Artist as a Hood"	1992	—	—	67	17	—	—	—		Derelicts of Dialect
"Gladiator"	1992	—	—	—	—	—	—	—		Gladiator Soundtrack
"Brooklyn-Queens (The U.K. Power Mix)" (Note: "Brooklyn-Queens (The U.K. Power Mix)" was released as a split single with "Cake and Eat it Too (Pound Cake Mix)" by Nice & Smooth.)	2018	—	—	—	—	—	—	—		Non-album single
"—" denotes a recording that did not chart or was not released in that territory.

==== Promotional singles ====
List of singles, showing year released and album name
Title	Year	Album
"Hail to the Chief"	2000	Non-album single
