= Bobbito Garcia =

Bobbito García
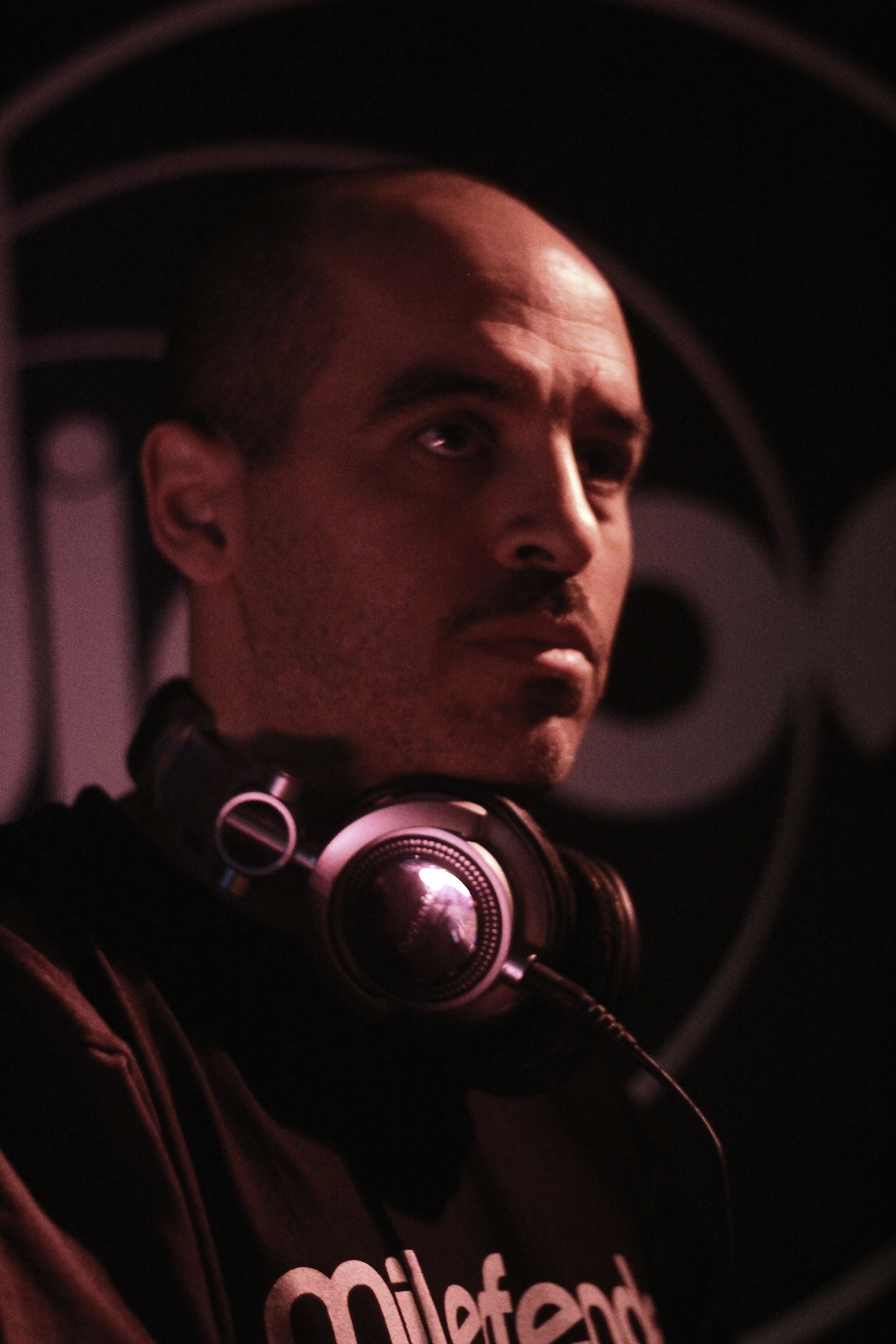
- García in 2014
- Born: Robert Garcia; September 25, 1966 (age 59); New York City, U.S.
- Other names: Kool Bob Love; DJ Cucumber Slice; Bobbito the Barber; DJ Bobby DoorKnob
- Occupations: Disc jockey; radio show host; record producer; author
- Years active: 1989–present
- Known for: The Stretch Armstrong and Bobbito Show
- Musical career
- Genres: East Coast hip hop; underground hip hop
- Instrument: Turntables
- Labels: Fondle 'Em; Def Jam

Robert "Bobbito" Garcia (born September 25, 1966), also known as DJ Cucumber Slice and Kool Bob Love, is an American DJ, radio host, author, and member of the Rock Steady Crew. He is known as a former co-host of hip hop radio show The Stretch Armstrong and Bobbito Show, alongside Adrian "Stretch Armstrong" Bartos, from 1990 until 1999. He later moved to Washington, D.C., where he currently hosts a new podcast on NPR called What's Good? alongside Bartos.

== Early life ==
Garcia attended Lower Merion High School and Wesleyan University (class of 1988).

== Music career ==
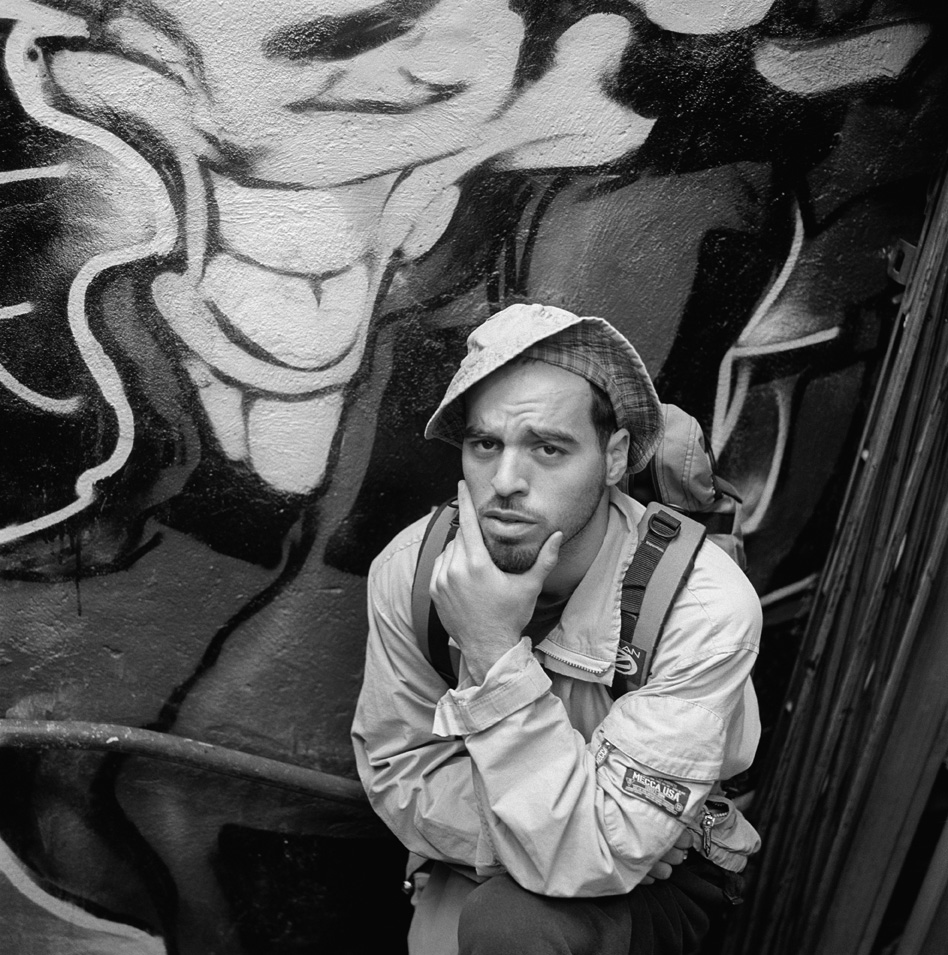
Garcia in 1997

Bobbito initially started as an intern at Def Jam.

From 1990 to 1998, Garcia co-hosted The Stretch Armstrong and Bobbito Show on Columbia University's WKCR. It featured exclusive demo tapes and in-studio freestyles from many then-unsigned hip hop artists such as Nas, Big Pun, Jay-Z, Busta Rhymes, Fat Joe, Cam'ron, DMX, Wu-Tang Clan, Fugees, Talib Kweli, Big L and The Notorious B.I.G. who later found great success on major record labels.

He set up the vinyl-only label Fondle 'Em Records in 1995 as an outlet for other guests such as MF Doom, MF Grimm, Kool Keith and Cage. In 1998, The Source named The Stretch Armstrong and Bobbito Show as the "Best Hip Hop Radio Show of All Time".

In 2003, García created Bounce: From the Playground, a quarterly magazine devoted to streetball, especially the playground scene in New York City. He has been an editor, writer, and photographer for the magazine, and has also done work for and been featured in magazines including Vibe and The Source.

He was featured in a 2002 article in Vibe Magazine.

== Film career ==
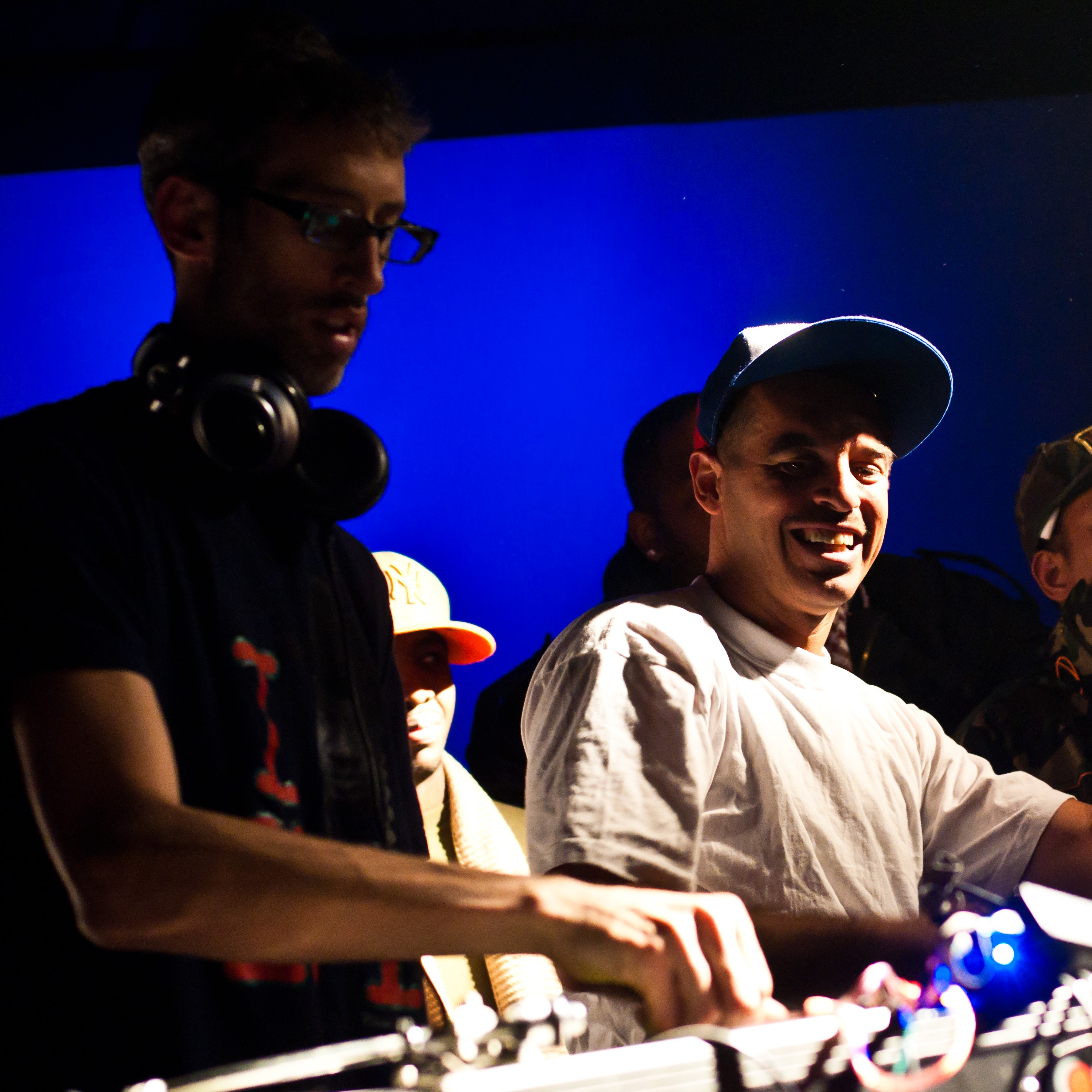
Garcia (right) and Stretch Armstrong DJing together in 2011

In 2012, he directed a basketball documentary with Kevin Couliao titled Doin' It in the Park. The film includes NBA stars such as Kareem Abdul-Jabbar, Wilt Chamberlain, and Walt Bellamy, as well as streetball legends like Richard "Pee Wee" Kirkland, Corey "Homicide" Williams, and Jack "Black Jack" Ryan.

In 2015, Showtime premiered a feature-length documentary on Stretch and Bobbito: Radio That Changed Lives, directed and written by Garcia. The film includes interviews with Jay-Z, Nas, Eminem, Common, Fat Joe, Rosie Perez and DJ Premier, among others.

In 2018, Garcia released his third documentary, Rock Rubber 45s. It serves as his most personal film to date. In an interview with HipHopDX, he explained, "There's a great O.C. lyric from the song 'Time's Up' where he goes, 'The more emotion I put into it, the harder I rock.' That's the sort of approach that I have with this film — that the more emotion that I put in, the better the film will be. You know you get one chance to do an autobiography, so I've decided to just bare all."

== Sneakers ==
Garcia hosted the ESPN Films It's the Shoes, interviewing celebrities about their sneaker collection. He was featured in the sneaker documentary Just for Kicks. He wrote Where'd You Get Those?: New York City's Sneaker Culture 1960–1987 as well as Out of the Box, about limited edition sneakers.

In 2007, he worked with Nike on limited edition Nike Air Force 1 and Air Force 25 models, selecting the colors, fabrics and logo used, and designed the "Project Playground" limited edition of the Adidas Superstar. In 2016, he collaborated with Puma for a brand of sneakers.

== Basketball ==
Garcia is a streetball player and coach.

He is the announcer in the video games NBA Street Vol. 2, NBA Street V3, and NBA The Run.

In 2006, Madison Square Garden Network hired García to do the "Hot Minute at the Half" reports with celebrities in the crowd during Knicks home games.

He is emcee of the Sprite Slam Dunk Contest in the video games NBA 2K8, 2K9, and 2K10.

In 2009, he worked on Blokhedz animated web series on Missiong.com. Garcia is the annual Boost Mobile Elite 24 HS All-American Game play-by-play announcer for ESPNU, owner of the vinyl-only label/imprint Álala Records, and co-directing a documentary, Doin' It in the Park: Pick-up Basketball, New York City, produced by 360 Creative Films, which premiered in New York theaters in June 2013. Bobbito has his own basketball tournament called Bob's Full Court 21, which he holds around the nation.

== Airborne Illness Awareness Education ==
Garcia has spoken publicly about the ongoing COVID-19 pandemic and organized events with strong mitigations in place for airborne illness spread.

Positive Deviance NYC interviewed him about "his path to Airborne-Awareness, the importance of cultivating community in a time of mass denial, and his optimism about masks-required spaces at the vanguard of counterculture. We learned that Bob’s revolutionary optimism is part of who he’s always been and that his COVID-consciousness is fully aligned with the values he has held close throughout his life and career." in the video "Filling The Void: Bobbito García on What (and Who) the World's Been Missing"
