= MC Serch =

American rapper (born 1967)

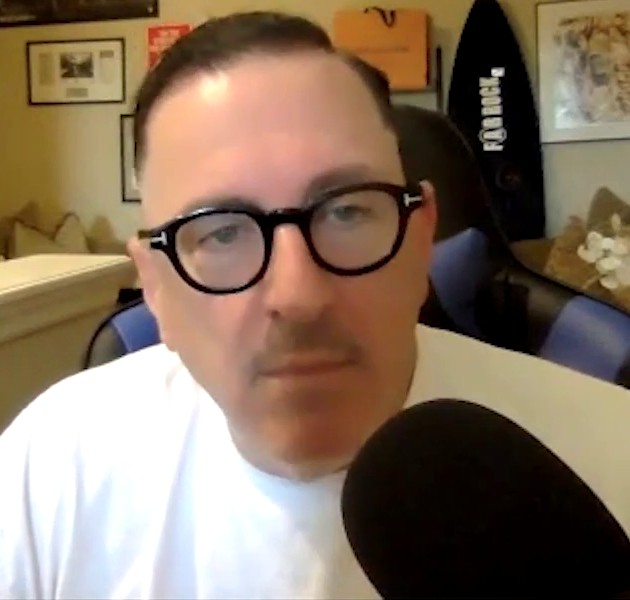
- MC Serch in 2023

Background information
- Also known as: T Bone Lemke; White Monster
- Born: Michael Berrin; May 6, 1967 (age 59); Queens, New York City, U.S.
- Genres: East Coast hip-hop; golden age hip-hop
- Occupations: Rapper; songwriter; record producer
- Years active: 1986–present
- Labels: Def Jam; Psycho+Logical
- Formerly of: 3rd Bass
- Website: mcserch.com

Michael Berrin (born May 6, 1967), better known by his stage name MC Serch, is an American rapper and record executive. He gained fame as part of the hip hop group 3rd Bass, who were active in the late 1980s and early 1990s and released three studio albums.

In his solo work, Serch is credited with having discovered American rapper Nas in 1992. Serch introduced the rapper to Columbia Records and executive produced his debut studio album, Illmatic (1994).

== Early life and education ==
Serch grew up in Far Rockaway, Queens, New York and graduated from Music & Art High School. He is of Jewish descent.

== Career ==
After recording three albums with 3rd Bass—The Cactus Album (1989), The Cactus Revisited (1990), and Derelicts of Dialect (1991)—Serch launched a solo career with Return of the Product (1992, Def Jam). The album featured two hit singles: "Here It Comes" (which hit number one on Billboard's Hot Rap Tracks chart); and "Back to the Grill" featuring Chubb Rock, Red Hot Lover Tone, and Nasty Nas. Serch was the executive producer of Nas’ Illmatic.

He also helped to cultivate the rapper O.C. after hearing him on the Organized Konfusion song "Fudge Pudge", helping him secure a record contract with Wild Pitch Records. In 1995, Serch also mentored the newly formed Non Phixion.

Since retiring from performing, Serch has run a promotions company (Serchlite Music). He appeared in Spike Lee's Bamboozled (2000) as a member of the fictitious hip-hop group Mau Maus (played by other real-life hip-hop performers such as Mos Def, Charli Baltimore and Canibus). His character was a white revolutionary who was supposed to be "1/16 black".

From 2003, he hosted Serch in the AM on Detroit urban radio station FM 98 WJLB; he was the first Jewish DJ at that station. MC Serch was dismissed from WJLB in March 2006, reportedly due to a dispute over a Super Bowl weekend party at the club Motor City Live.

Serch also hosted the VH1 reality series Ego Trip's The (White) Rapper Show which ended in March 2007. On the show he was known for his catchphrase "Woop-WOOP!". A follow-up show, Ego Trip's Miss Rap Supreme, debuted in 2008.

Serch has since returned to the radio airwaves in Detroit on the urban station Hot 102.7. Serch has also worked with Hot 102.7's youngest intern (The Black Intern) Daniel Berry, and Rucka Rucka Ali (Comedy Music Artist). Serch appeared in some of Rucka Rucka Ali's music videos.

In 2018, he gave an interview with DJ Vlad in which he claimed MC Hammer had once taken out a $50,000 contract on Serch's life, following a misunderstanding over lyrics.

In May 2021, MC Serch joined VidSig, a live global video platform, as Chief Creative Consultant.

Serch was an executive at HitPiece, a startup creating NFTs of songs that shut down in February 2022 under threat of action by Recording Industry Association of America, which labeled it a "scam operation" and after public criticism by major artists including Wolfgang Van Halen.

== Discography ==
=== Solo ===
- Return of the Product (1992, Def Jam)

=== with 3rd Bass ===
- The Cactus Album (1989, Platinum)
- The Cactus Revisited (1990)
- Derelicts of Dialect (1991, Gold)

=== Guest appearances ===
List of non-single guest appearances, with other performing artists, showing year released and album name
Title	Year	Other artist(s)	Album
"Puff the Head"	1992	—N/a	Zebrahead (soundtrack)
"Blak Iz Blak"	2000	Mau Maus (Mos Def, Canibus, Charli Baltimore, Mums, Gano Grills, DJ Scratch)	Bamboozled (Original Motion Picture Soundtrack)
"Fuck You"	2001	DJ Tomekk	Return of Hip Hop
"2 Hits & Pass"	2002	Afu-Ra, Agallah, Big Tigger, Buckshot, Craig G, Mr. Eon, Scram Jones, Smuv, Steele, Tony Touch	D&D Project II
"Let's Talk"	2005	Hot Karl	The Great Escape
"MC Serch Intro"	2007	Kaptain Nemo	The Legend of Kaptain Nemo - Official Mixtape
"For the Love of Hip Hop"	2007	Kaptain Nemo, PJ Sumroc	The Legend of Kaptain Nemo - Official Mixtape
"This Is Not a Game Aaaatlaaaantis (MC Serch Interlude)"	2007	Kaptain Nemo	The Legend of Kaptain Nemo - Official Mixtape
"Round Here"	2007	Krohme	All Praises Due
"Benetton"	2009	Kurious, MF Doom, Kadi Amin	II
"Rolling 110 Deep"	2021	DJ Kay Slay, 3D Na'Tee, AZ, Aobie, Big Daddy Kane, Black Thought, Bodega Bamz, Brand Nubian, Bumpy Knuckles, Bun B, Bynoe, Cassidy, Chris Rivers, Chuck D, Coke La Rock, Consequence, Conway the Machine, Cory Gunz, Crooked I, Dave East, DJ Doo-Wop, Drag-On, E-A-Ski, Fred the Godson, Ghostface Killah, Gillie da Kid, Grandmaster Caz, Gunplay, Havoc, McGruff, Hocus 45th, Ice-T, Inspectah Deck, J.R. Writer, Jim Jones, Joell Ortiz, Jon Connor, Junior Reid, Kaflow Kaboom, Kool G Rap, KRS-One, Lil' Cease, Loaded Lux, Locksmith, Lord Tariq and Peter Gunz, Maino, MC Shan, Melle Mel, Merkules, Mike Cee, Millyz, Mistah F.A.B., M.O.P., Ms. Hustle, Mysonne, Nice & Smooth, Nino Man, OT the Real, Omar Epps, Onyx, Oun P, Outlawz, Page Kennedy, Papoose, Pretty Tone Capone, Prince the King, RJ Payne, Raekwon, Rah Digga, Ransom, Ras Kass, Kool DJ Red Alert, Redman, Rockness, Ron Artest, Roy Jones Jr., Royal Flush, Saigon, Shaquille O'Neal, Sheek Louch, Shoota 93, Sickflo, Sonja Blade, Sporty Thievz, Stan Spit, Styleon, Styles P, Super Lover Cee, Termanology, Tone Trump, Tony Moxberg, Tracey Lee, Trae tha Truth, Tragedy Khadafi, Treach, Trick Trick, Twista, Uncle Murda, Vado, Wais P, Young Buck	Accolades
