= Downtown Science (group) =

American hip hop group

- Bosco Money and Sam Sever

Background information
- Origin: Queens, New York
- Genres: Hip hop
- Years active: 1988–1992
- Label: Def Jam
- Past members: Kenneth Carabello; Sam Sever

Downtown Science was an American hip-hop duo composed of rapper/producer Kenneth "Bosco Money" Carabello and producer Sam "Sever" Citrin.

== History ==
Sam Sever had previously contributed production work on the 3rd Bass albums, The Cactus Album and Derelicts of Dialect.

After associating with Def Jam in the late 1980s, Carabello and Sever would later release 1991's Downtown Science via Columbia Records. The album included the singles "Radioactive" and "Room To Breathe".

After the standalone track "If I Was" appeared on Livin' Large! Original Motion Picture Soundtrack, the group disbanded and did not release any further material as a duo.

== Discography ==
Albums

- 1991: Downtown Science

Singles

- 1988: "Now Listen"
- 1991: "Big Yellow 12-Inch"
- 1991: "Radioactive"
- 1991: "Room to Breathe"
