= Chung King Studios =

Defunct American recording studio

Coordinates: 40°45′3.3″N 73°59′6.4″W

Chung King Studios was a recording studio that operated in New York City under that name from 1986 to 2015. It was founded by producer John King and engineer Steve Ett with financial backing from the Etches brothers, occupying three locations during that era. One of those locations is the current home of The Soho Sessions. Countless notable hip hop acts recorded music at Chung King Studios over the years, including Run-DMC, LL Cool J, Beastie Boys, Public Enemy, Busta Rhymes, Notorious B.I.G., Tupac Shakur, Lauryn Hill, Outkast, ODB, Method Man, Nas, Jay-Z, Hell Razah, Lil Wayne, and Kanye West. The studio became one of the most important recording spaces in the history of hip hop, pioneering commercial production of rap music. Beyond hip hop, notable groups like Aerosmith, Amy Winehouse, Beyoncé, Blondie, David Bowie, Depeche Mode, Destiny's Child, Fergie, Lady Gaga, Maxwell, Moby and Phish also recorded there.

== History ==
=== Secret Society records ===
John King founded Secret Society Records in 1979 before opening a studio in the early 1980s on the sixth floor of 241 Centre Street. The building was located just outside New York's Chinatown and the ground floor was occupied by Chung King Chinese restaurant. The one-room studio soon became a popular recording destination for local rock and punk bands. In 1984, after a chance encounter with Def Jam Recordings cofounders Russell Simmons and Rick Rubin at the Danceteria nightclub on 21st Street, the studio began their foray into rap music with Def Jam artists. Although hip hop was still an undeveloped music genre, the partnership would lead to tremendous success and in fact accelerate the genre.

=== Chung King Studios ===
The studio quickly gained a reputation in the international recording industry with the unprecedented commercial success of their rap artists. They garnered attention by producing iconic 1980s rap albums like Radio by LL Cool J in 1984–85, Raising Hell by Run-DMC in 1985–1986, Licensed to Ill by Beastie Boys in 1986, and It Takes a Nation of Millions to Hold Us Back by Public Enemy in 1987–88. By the summer of 1986, Raising Hell had become the first Platinum album in the history of hip hop.

The Secret Society studio had been colloquially dubbed "Chung King House of Metal" by Rubin, an amalgamation of the Chung King restaurant on the ground floor, John King's surname, and the hard rock acts they had been booking prior to their Def Jam collaboration. Inspired by Rubin's nickname, King officially transformed Secret Society Records into Chung King Studios in 1986.

=== Varick Street studio ===
In 1993, now in high demand among rap artists, Chung King Studios moved 10 blocks west to a penthouse on the twelfth floor of 170 Varick Street in the Hudson Square neighborhood. The two-floor, multimillion-dollar facility became one of the premiere studio spaces in the world with four themed rooms; the red room, the blue room, the green room, and the gold room. The studio's 15-year collaboration with Def Jam finally came to an end in 1999. In January 2010, Chung King abruptly vacated their Varick Street studio after 17 years.

=== 37th Street studio ===
Chung King Studios reopened in March 2012 in the Midtown area in a space previously operated by Skyline Studios. They built a 5,000-square-foot facility at 36 West 37th Street, two miles north of the former location, containing two recording studios and a space for live performances. After less than three years, on February 13, 2015, King recorded the final session in the studio's history. He cited reasons for the closure that included rent that was no longer affordable at $25,000 a month, the difficulty of moving equipment through New York City, and a changing music business in which record companies were unwilling to pay the going rate for a large studio. The space was taken over by Steve Salett, founder of Saltlands Studio in Brooklyn. Renamed Reservoir Studios, this business still occupies the space (as of 2020).

== Accolades ==
Chung King Studios became known as the "Abbey Road of hip hop". The studio was recognized as one of the most successful audio recording and production facilities in the world, nominated by Mix magazine's Tech Awards for Outstanding Acoustic Design on several occasions. Founder John King received numerous RIAA Industry Awards and a SPARS award for recording excellence. The music produced by Chung King Studios has sold over 300 million units and generated $4.5 billion.
