= Prince Paul production discography =

Production discography

The following list is a discography of production credited to Prince Paul, an American hip hop record producer and recording artist from Amityville, New York. It includes a list of songs produced, co-produced and remixed by year, artist, album and title.

== 1986 ==
=== Stetsasonic – On Fire ===
(Produced with Stetsasonic.)

- 01. "4 Ever My Beat"
- 02. "My Rhyme"
- 03. "Just Say Stet"
- 04. "Faye"
- 05. "4 Ever My Mouth"
- 06. "Rock De La Stet"
- 07. "Go Stetsa I"
- 08. "On Fire"
- 09. "Bust That Groove"
- 10. "Paul's Groove"

== 1988 ==
=== Stetsasonic – In Full Gear ===
- 01. "In Full Gear"
- 06. "Pen & Paper"
- 07. "Music for the Stetfully Insane"
- 08. "We're the Band" (co-produced by Daddy-O)
- 09. "Rollin' wit Rush" (co-produced by Daddy-O)
- 12. "Sally"
- 13. "Talkin' All that Jazz"
- 16. "Miami Bass" (co-produced by Daddy-O)

=== MC Lyte – Lyte As a Rock ===
- 04. "MC Lyte Likes Swingin'"

== 1989 ==
=== De La Soul – 3 Feet High and Rising ===
(Produced with De La Soul.)

- 01. "Intro"
- 02. "The Magic Number"
- 03. "Change in Speak"
- 04. "Cool Breeze on the Rocks"
- 05. "Can U Keep a Secret"
- 06. "Jenifa Taught Me (Derwin's Revenge)"
- 07. "Ghetto Thang"
- 08. "Transmitting Live from Mars"
- 09. "Eye Know"
- 10. "Take It Off"
- 11. "A Little Bit of Soap"
- 12. "Tread Water"
- 13. "Potholes in My Lawn"
- 14. "Say No Go"
- 15. "Do as De La Does"
- 16. "Plug Tunin' (Last Chance to Comprehend)"
- 17. "De La Orgee"
- 18. "Buddy" (featuring Jungle Brothers and Q-Tip)
- 19. "Description"
- 20. "Me Myself & I"
- 21. "This Is a Recording 4 Living in a Fulltime Era (L.I.F.E.)"
- 22. "I Can Do Anything (Delacratic)"
- 23. "D.A.I.S.Y. Age"
- 24. "Plug Tunin'" (Original 12" version)
- 00. Bonus Tracks on 35th Anniversary Edition

=== Fine Young Cannibals - Good Thing 12" ===
- A1. "Good Thing (Prince Paul Remix)"

=== Living Colour - Funny Vibe 12" ===
- A3. "Funny Vibe (Funky Vibe Mix)"

=== Big Daddy Kane – It's a Big Daddy Thing ===
- 01. "It's a Big Daddy Thing"
- 10. "Ain't No Stoppin' Us Now"

=== Chill Rob G – Ride the Rhythm ===
- 12. "Let Me Show You (Remix)" (remixed with Pasemaster Mase)

=== Cookie Crew - Born This Way 12" ===
- A2. "Born This Way (Let's Dance) (The Prince Paul Dope Mix)"

=== Cookie Crew - Got to Keep On 12" ===
- A2. "Got to Keep On (What's a Remix? Remix)"

=== Newkirk - Funk City ===
- 12. "Nasty Fat Nasty"

=== Queen Latifah – All Hail the Queen ===
- 02. "Mama Gave Birth to the Soul Children" (feat. De La Soul)

=== 3rd Bass – The Cactus Album ===
- 04. "The Gas Face" (feat. Zen Love X)
- 17. "Brooklyn-Queens" (produced with Pete Nice)

=== Marc Anthony Thompson - Dog in the Road (Of Life) 12" ===
- A5. "Dog in the Road (Of Life) (Strong Island Remix)"

== 1990 ==
=== Black Rock & Ron – You Can't Do Me None 12" ===
- B1. "You Can't Do Me None (Prince Paul Remix)"

=== Boo Yaa Tribe – Psy-ko Funk 12" ===
- A1. "Psyko Funk (Remix)"

=== Groove B Chill – Starting From Zero ===
- 04. "Let It Roll"
- 09. "Top of the Hill"

=== Big Daddy Kane – Taste of Chocolate ===
- 03. "It's Hard Being the Kane"
- 06. "No Damn Good"

=== Jaz-O – To Your Soul ===
- 02. "It's that Simple" (feat. Jay-Z)
- 04. "Abnormal"

=== Fine Young Cannibals - I'm Not Satisfied 12" ===
- A4. "I'm Not Satisfied (New York Rap Mix)"

=== 3rd Bass - The Cactus Revisited ===
- 01. "The Gas Face (Remixed)" [feat. Zen Love X] {lyrical remix}

== 1991 ==
=== Nikki D – Daddy's Little Girl ===
- 12. "Freak Accident"

=== Stetsasonic – Blood, Sweat & No Tears ===
- 03. "Uda Man"
- 06. "Blood, Sweat & No Tears"
- 12. "Your Mother Has Green Teeth"
- 16. "Paul's a Sucker"
- 00. "To Whom It May Concern" [cassette exclusive track]
- 00. "Walkin' in the Rain" [cassette exclusive track]

=== De La Soul – De La Soul Is Dead ===
(Produced with De La Soul.)

- 01. "Intro"
- 02. "Oodles of O's"
- 03. "Talkin' Bout Hey Love"
- 04. "Pease Porridge"
- 05. "Skit 1"
- 06. "Johnny's Dead AKA Vincent Mason (Live from the BK Lounge)"
- 07. "A Roller Skating Jam Named "Saturdays"" (featuring Q-Tip and Vinia Mojica)
- 08. "WRMS' Dedication to the Bitty"
- 09. "Bitties in the BK Lounge"
- 10. "Skit 2"
- 11. "My Brother's a Basehead" (featuring Squirrell and Preacher)
- 12. "Let, Let Me In"
- 13. "Afro Connections at a Hi 5 (In the Eyes of the Hoodlum)"
- 14. "Rap de Rap Show"
- 15. "Millie Pulled a Pistol on Santa"
- 16. "Who Do U Worship?"
- 17. "Skit 3"
- 18. "Kicked out the House"
- 19. "Pass the Plugs"
- 20. "Not Over till the Fat Lady Plays the Demo"
- 21. "Ring Ring Ring (Ha Ha Hey)"
- 22. "WRMS: Cat's in Control"
- 23. "Skit 4"
- 24. "Shwingalokate"
- 25. "Fanatic of the B Word" (feat. Dres)
- 26. "Keepin' the Faith"
- 27. "Skit 5"

=== De La Soul - "A Roller Skating Jam Named 'Saturdays'" 12" ===
- A3. "What Yo Life Can Truly Be" (feat. Dres & A Tribe Called Quest)

=== De La Soul - "Keepin' the Faith" 12" ===
- A2. "Keepin' the Faith (Straight Mix)" (feat. Vinia Mojica)

=== 3rd Bass – Derelicts of Dialect ===
(Produced with 3rd Bass.)

- 02. "Derelicts of Dialect"
- 10. "Herbalz in Your Mouth"
- 13. "Come In"
- 14. "No Static at All"
- 20. "Green Eggs and Swine"

=== Resident Alien – It Takes a Nation of Suckers to Let Us In ~~(shelved)~~ ===
- 01. "Intro"
- 02. "The Resident Alien"
- 03. "I Yam What I Yam"
- 04. "The Ox Tail, the Burger & Chic"
- 05. "Miss Lee"
- 06. "Shakey Ground" (feat. Dres and Maseo)
- 07. "Ardicle Don"
- 08. "Horrorscope"
- 09. "Midtro"
- 10. "Ooh the Dew Doo Man"
- 11. "Mr. Boops"
- 12. "Alone"
- 13. "State of Emergency"
- 14. "Are You Ready"
- 15. "We Na Play"
- 16. "Wanna Be (Russell)"
- 17. "Mother's Day"
- 18. "Third World"
- 19. "Extro"
- 20. "Welcome to America"

== 1992 ==
=== Cypress Hill – Latin Lingo 12" ===
- A1. "Latin Lingo (Prince Paul Mix)"

=== Boogie Down Productions – Sex and Violence ===
- 03. "Drug Dealer"
- 12. "Sex and Violence"
- 13. "How Not to Get Jerked"

== 1993 ==
=== Candyman – I Thought U Knew ===
- 02. "Sex It Up"
- 09. "Return of the Candyman"

=== Justin Warfield – My Field Trip to Planet 9 ===
- 03. "Dip Dip Divin'"
- 04. "K Sera Sera"
- 15. "Thoughts in the Buttermilk"

=== De La Soul – Buhloone Mindstate ===
(Produced with De La Soul.)

- 01. "Intro"
- 02. "Eye Patch"
- 03. "En Focus" (featuring Shortie No Mass and Dres)
- 04. "Patti Dooke" (featuring Guru, Maceo Parker, Fred Wesley and Pee Wee Ellis)
- 05. "I Be Blowin'" (featuring Maceo Parker)
- 06. "Long Island Wildin'" (featuring Scha Dara Parr and Takagi Kan)
- 07. "Ego Trippin' (Part Two)"
- 08. "Paul's Revenge"
- 09. "3 Days Later"
- 10. "Area"
- 11. "I Am I Be" (featuring Maceo Parker, Fred Wesley and Pee Wee Ellis)
- 12. "In the Woods" (featuring Shortie No Mass)
- 13. "Breakadawn"
- 14. "Dave Has a Problem...Seriously"
- 15. "Stone Age" (featuring Biz Markie)
- 00. "Lovely How I Let My Mind Float" (featuring Biz Markie)
- 00. "Mindstate"

== 1994 ==
=== De La Soul – Clear Lake Audiotorium ===
- 03. "Sh.Fe.Mc's" (featuring A Tribe Called Quest)
- 06. "Stix & Stonz" (featuring Tito of The Fearless Four, Grandmaster Caz, Whipper Whip, LA Sunshine, and Superstar)

=== Gravediggaz – 6 Feet Deep ===
- 01. "Just When You Thought It Was Over (Intro)"
- 02. "Constant Elevation"
- 03. "Nowhere to Run, Nowhere to Hide"
- 04. "Defective Trip (Trippin')"
- 05. "Two Cups of Blood"
- 07. "360 Questions"
- 08. "1-800 Suicide"
- 09. "Diary of a Madman" [feat. Killah Priest & Shabazz the Disciple] (co-produced by RZA and RNS)
- 10. "Mommy, What's a Gravedigga?"
- 11. "Bang Your Head"
- 14. "Death Trap"
- 16. "Rest in Peace (Outro)"
- 00. "Pass the Shovel" [European bonus track]
- 00. "Freak the Sorceress" [12" bonus track]

=== Slick Rick – Behind Bars ===
- 01. "Behind Bars"

=== Kurious – A Constipated Monkey (demo sessions) ===
- 00. "Rice and Beans (Freestyle)"
- 00. "Catch My Drift"

== 1995 ==
=== Beastie Boys - Root Down EP ===
- A6. "Root Down (PP Balloon Mix)"

=== Alliance Ethnik - Simple & Funky\Respect 12" ===
- A2. "Simple & Funky (Prince Paul Remix)"
- B2. "Respect - Prince Paul's Bag Of Tricks Remix"

=== Horror City – '95 Demo EP 12" (~~unreleased)~~ ===
- A1. "Take It How You Want It"
- A2. "Big Sha"
- B2. "Tattles Tale"
- B3. "Headbounty"

== 1996 ==
=== Prince Paul – Psychoanalysis: What Is It? ===
- 01. "Introduction to Psychoanalysis (Schizophrenia)"
- 02. "Beautiful Night (Manic Psychopath)"
- 03. "Open Your Mouth (Hypothalamus)"
- 04. "You Made Me (A.K.C.)"
- 05. "Vexual Healing (Vacillation)"
- 06. "To Get a Gun"
- 07. "J.O.B. – Das What Dey Is !"
- 08. "The World's a Stage (A Dramady)"
- 09. "Booty Clap"
- 10. "The Bitch Blues (Life Experiences)"
- 11. "In Your Mind (Altered States)"
- 12. "Drinks (Escapism)"
- 13. "Psycho Linguistics (Convergent Thought)"
- 14. "That's Entertainment !? (Aversive Conditioning)"
- 15. "Outroduction to Diagnosis Psychosis"

Tracks included on latter edition

- 00. "Why Must You Hate Me?
- 00. "Dimepieces"
- 00. "2 B Blunt (A True Story)"

=== Twigy – 聖戦 12" ===
- A2. "聖戦Part II" (feat. Dev-Large)

=== Various Artists – Subterranean Hitz Vol. I ===
- 05. "Sucker for Love" - performed by Prince Paul

=== Various artists – America Is Dying Slowly ===
- 01. "No Rubber, No Backstage Pass" - performed by Biz Markie, Chubb Rock, and Prince Paul

=== Vernon Reid – Mistaken Identity ===
- (full album co-producer)

== 1997 ==
=== Dr. Octagon – Blue Flowers CDS ===
- 02. "Blue Flowers (Prince Paul "So Beautiful" Mix)"

=== Gravediggaz – The Pick, the Sickle and the Shovel ===
- 15. "Outro"

=== Imani Coppola – Legend of a Cowgirl CDS ===
- 03. "Legend of a Cowgirl (Prince Paul Mix)"

=== Chris Rock – Roll With The New ===
- (full album)

== 1998 ==
=== Metabolics – The M-Virus ===
- 08. "Lyrical Chemical"

=== Method Man – Tical 2000: Judgement Day ===
- 15. "You Play Too Much (Skit)"

== 1999 ==
=== Prince Paul – A Prince Among Thieves ===
- 02. "Pain"
- 04. "Steady Slobbin'"
- 06. "What U Got (The Demo)"
- 08. "MC Hustler"
- 10. "The Other Line"
- 12. "Weapon World" (feat. Kool Keith)
- 14. "War Party"
- 16. "Macula's Theory" (feat. Big Daddy Kane)
- 17. "Mr. Large" (feat. Chubb Rock and Biz Markie)
- 19. "Put the Next Man On"
- 22. "More Than U Know" (feat. De La Soul)
- 24. "Mood for Love"
- 26. "The Men in Blue" (feat. Everlast)
- 28. "Handle Your Time" (feat. Sadat X, Xzibit and Kid Creole)
- 32. "You Got Shot"
- 35. "A Prince Among Thieves"

=== Chris Rock – Bigger & Blacker ===
- (full album)

=== Handsome Boy Modeling School – So... How's Your Girl? ===
(All tracks co-produced with Dan the Automator, except #8 co-produced with Dan the Automator and DJ Shadow.)

- 01. "Rock n' Roll (Could Never Hip Hop Like This)"
- 02. "Magnetizing" (featuring Del tha Funkee Homosapien)
- 03. "Metaphysical" (featuring Miho Hatori and Mike D)
- 04. "Look at This Face (Oh My God They're Gorgeous)"
- 06. "Once Again (Here to Kick One for You)" (featuring Grand Puba and Sadat X)
- 07. "The Truth" (featuring Róisín Murphy and J-Live)
- 08. "Holy Calamity (Bear Witness II)" (featuring DJ Shadow and DJ Quest)
- 09. "Calling the Biz"
- 10. "The Projects (P Jays)" (featuring Dave and Del tha Funkee Homosapien)
- 11. "Sunshine" (featuring Sean Lennon, Money Mark, Father Guido Sarducci, Josh Haden, and Paula Frazer)
- 12. "Modeling Sucks"
- 13. "Torch Song Trilogy" (featuring Sensational)
- 14. "The Runway Song" (featuring Kid Koala)
- 15. "Megaton B-Boy 2000" (featuring Alec Empire and El-P)
- 16. "Father Speaks" (featuring Father Guido Sarducci)

=== Beastie Boys - Negotiation Limerick File Promo ===
- A3. "The Negotiation Limerick File - Handsome Boy Modeling School Makeover"

=== Various artists – MTV Celebrity Deathmatch (soundtrack) ===
- 08. "Secret Wars (Prince Paul Mix)" - performed by The Last Emperor

== 2000 ==
=== Del the Funky Homosapien – Both Sides of the Brain ===
- 13. "Signature Slogans"

=== MC Paul Barman – It's Very Stimulating ===
- 01. "An Introduction"
- 02. "The Joy of Your World"
- 03. "School Anthem"
- 04. "Salvation Barmy"
- 05. "I'm Fricking Awesome"
- 06. "Mtv Get off the Air, part 2" (feat. Princess Superstar)

== 2001 ==
=== The Last Emperor – The Banger / The Umph 12" ===
- B4. "Monolith"

=== J-Live – The Best Part ===
- 09. "Wax Paper"

=== Tragedy Khadafi – Against All Odds ===
- 01. "Intro (The Conflict)"
- 05. "Skit 2: The Jump Off"
- 14. "Skit 3: More Thugg More Names"

=== Mr. Dead – Metabolics Volume II: Dawn Of The Dead ===
- 06. "Dawn of the Dead"

=== Various Artists- Pootie Tang (soundtrack) ===
- 15. "Ode to Pootie"

== 2002 ==
=== The Avalanches – Since I Left You 12" ===
- A1. "Since I Left You (Prince Paul Remix)"

=== MC Paul Barman – Paullelujah! ===
- 05. "Bleeding Brain Grow"

=== Various artists – Dexter's Laboratory - The Hip-Hop Experiment ===
- 07. "Back to the Lab" - performed by Prince Paul

=== J-Live – The Day I Fell Off / School's In 12" ===
- A1. "The Day I Fell Off"

== 2003 ==
=== Prince Paul – Politics of the Business ===
- 01. "A Day in the Life" (feat. Dave Chappelle)
- 02. "Popmaster Intro" (feat. Popmaster)
- 03. "Make Room" (feat. Erick Sermon, Mally G and Sy Scott)
- 04. "The Drive By"
- 05. "So What" (feat. Masta Ace, Pretty Ugly and Kokane)
- 06. "Drama Queen" (feat. Dave and Truth Enola)
- 07. "Not Tryin' to Hear That/Words (Album Leak)" (feat. Guru and Planet Asia)
- 08. "Politics of the Business" (feat. Chuck D and Ice-T)
- 09. "Crhyme Pays/Ralph Nader" (feat. The Beatnuts, Tash, Tony Touch and Biz Markie)
- 10. "What I Need" (feat. Kardinal Offishall and Sly Boogy)
- 11. "Princepaulonline.com/The Word"
- 12. "Controversial Headlines AKA Champion Sound, Pt. 1/My Bookie" (feat. Horror City)
- 13. "Beautifully Absurd" (feat. W. Ellington Felton)
- 14. "Controversial Headlines AKA Champion Sound, Pt. 2" (feat. Horror City and Jean Grae)
- 15. "Chubb Rock Please Pay Paul His $2200 You Owe Him (People, Places, and Things)" (feat. Chubb Rock, MF Doom and Wordsworth)
- 16. "A Life in the Day"/ "Crhyme Pays" [Original Mix]/ "The Way My Life Seems"

=== The Last Emperor – Music, Magic, Myth ===
- 01. "Intro"
- 18. "The Great Pretender"
- 19. "Outro"

=== The Last Emperor – Palace of the Pretender ===
- 14. "Clear Day" (feat. Masta Ace and Trugoy the Dove)

== 2004 ==
=== MF Doom – Mm..LeftOvers ===
- 05. "Hot Guacamole"

=== Handsome Boy Modeling School – White People ===
(All tracks co-produced with Dan the Automator.)

- 01. "Intro" (featuring Father Guido Sarducci)
- 02. "If It Wasn't for You" (featuring De La Soul and Starchild Excalibur)
- 03. "Are You Down With It" (featuring Mike Patton)
- 04. "The World's Gone Mad" (featuring Del the Funky Homosapien, Barrington Levy and Alex Kapranos)
- 05. "Dating Game" (featuring Tim Meadows, Hines Buchanan and Neelam)
- 06. "Breakdown" (featuring Jack Johnson
- 07. "It's Like That / I Am Complete" (featuring Casual and Tim Meadows)
- 08. "I've Been Thinking" (featuring Cat Power)
- 09. "Rock and Roll (Could Never Hip Hop Like This) Part 2 / Knockers" (featuring Lord Finesse, Mike Shinoda, Chester Bennington, Rahzel, Q*bert, Grand Wizard Theodore, Jazzy Jay and Tim Meadows)
- 10. "The Hours"
- 11. "Class System" (featuring Pharrell and Julee Cruise)
- 12. "First... and Then" (featuring Dres)
- 13. "A Day in the Life / Good Hygiene" (featuring RZA, The Mars Volta, A.G. and Tim Meadows)
- 14. "Greatest Mistake" (featuring John Oates and Jamie Cullum)
- 15. "Dating Game Part 2" (featuring Tim Meadows, Hines Buchanan and Neelam)
- 16. "Outro" (featuring Father Guido Sarducci)

== 2005 ==
=== Chris Rock – Never Scared ===
- (full album)

=== Prince Paul – Itstrumental ===
- 01. "MVU (Act 1)"
- 02. "It's a Stick Up!"
- 03. "Flattery" (featuring Steinski)
- 04. "My Friend the Popmaster"
- 05. "Inside Your Mind" (featuring Mr. Dead & MC Paul Barman)
- 06. "El Ka Bong"
- 07. "MVU (Act 2)"
- 08. "Yes, I Do Love Them Ho's!"
- 09. "What are You Afraid Of?"
- 10. "I Want You (I'm an 80's Man)" (featuring Bimos)
- 11. "Profit"
- 12. "The Boston Top" (featuring Mr. Dead & Newkirk)
- 13. "MVU (Act 3)"
- 14. "And the Winner Is?"
- 15. "Gangstas My Style"
- 16. "The Night My Girlfriend Left Me" (featuring MC Paul Barman)
- 17. "Live @ 5"
- 18. "MVU (Final Act)"
- 19. "Think or Die"

=== The Dix – The Art Of Picking Up Women / The Rise And The Fall Of The Dix ===
- 01. "Intro to Women"
- 02. "Here Comes the Dix"
- 03. "Tears in My Eyes (Dirty Girl)"
- 04. "I Luv U Girl"
- 05. "When I Come Home to You"
- 06. "From the Top"
- 07. "Outro to Women"

== 2006 ==
=== De La Soul – The Impossible: Mission TV Series – Pt. 1 ===
- 05. "What the Fuck part one (De La Soul's Poster)"
- 10. "What the Fuck part two"

=== L.A. Symphony – CIWYW ===
- 11. "Broken Now" (~~unreleased)~~

== 2007 ==
=== Marvin Gaye – Here, My Dear (expanded edition) ===
- 2-06. "Everybody Needs Love (Alternate Version)"

=== Baby Elephant – Turn My Teeth Up! ===
- 01. "The Search (Skit)"
- 05. "Master (Skit)"
- 07. "Language (Skit)"
- 11. "Plug (Skit)"
- 14. "100 Keyboards (Skit)"
- 17. " Take Me to Brazil (Skit)"

== 2008 ==
=== MC Paul Barman – Full Buck Moon Kaboom ===
- 21. "Home (Prince Paul Remix)" (featuring Natural Calamity)
- 25. "Inside Your Mind" (featuring Mr. Dead)
- 26. "The Night My Girlfriend Left Me"

=== The Dino 5 – Baby Loves Hip Hop Presents The Dino 5 ===
- (full album)

== 2009 ==
=== MC Paul Barman – Thought Balloon Mushroom Cloud ===
- 08. "Get Along Song"

=== Souls of Mischief – Montezuma's Revenge ===
- 01. "Intro"
- 02. "Won!"
- 05. "Skit"
- 06. "Proper Aim"
- 09. "Poets Skit"
- 10. "Poets"
- 11. "Mr. Freeman Skit" (co-produced by Opio)
- 12. "Fourmation"
- 15. "Lickity Split"
- 16. "Home Game"
- 17. "Outro"
- 18. "Lalala"

== 2012 ==
=== Prince Paul & DJ Pforreal – Negroes on Ice ===
(All tracks co-produced with DJ Pforreal.)

- 01. "Disclaimer for Ignorance"
- 02. "This Is What Happened"
- 03. "Wake Up (LOAYBM)"
- 04. "Mad Black"
- 05. "Steppin" (featuring Breeze Brewin)
- 06. "The Nza"
- 07. "Paid It No Mind" (featuring Don Newkirk)
- 08. "The Cornbread Chase"
- 09. "Pixel Hero" (featuring Soce the Elemental Wizard)
- 10. "I Don't Discriminate"
- 11. "Textual Healing"
- 12. "Hey Negro Boy Slow Down"
- 13. "Craigslist" (featuring Talent Harris)
- 14. "Live from Lebron"
- 15. "My Favorite Sport"
- 16. "Thug Boat"
- 17. "I'm a G"
- 18. "Fake Maxwell"
- 19. "Auto, Dos, Tres"
- 20. "I Love Seal"
- 21. "Worldcup" (featuring Breeze Brewin, Talent Harris & Young Mel)
- 22. "Phil Jackson"
- 23. "Snitch" (featuring Breeze Brewin & Talent Harris)
- 24. "Triborough Power Walk"
- 25. "Cheesecake Factory" (featuring Talent Harris)
- 26. "Big Bank Hank"
- 27. "Dude You Left My Car Running" (featuring Talent Harris)
- 28. "Buddah Finga"

== 2015 ==
=== Run the Jewels – Meow the Jewels ===
- 06. "Lie, Cheat, Meow (Prince Paul Remix)"

== 2016 ==
=== Brookzill! – Throwback to the Future ===
- 01. "Macumba 3000"
- 02. "Raise the Flag"
- 03. "Saudade Songbook" (featuring Count Bass D)
- 04. "Nascido No Céu" (featuring Brian Jackson)
- 05. "Amigo Estranho Amigo" (featuring Elo Da Corrente)
- 06. "Maralém" (featuring Del the Funky Homosapien & Pequeno Cidadão)
- 07. "Mad Dog in Yoruba" (featuring Fafá de Belém & Kiko Dinucci)
- 08. "Brookzill! Suite" (featuring Juçara Marçal & Thiago França)
- 09. "S. Bento MC5" (featuring Espião, Rodrigo Ogi, Thaide & Xis)
- 10. "Mysterious"
- 11. "Todos Os Terreiros"
- 12. "Let's Go (É Noiz)!"

=== DJ Shadow – Endtroducing..... (Endtrospective Edition) ===
- 3-11. "What Does Your Soul Look Like (Part 1) (Prince Paul Remix)"

== 2017 ==
=== MC Paul Barman & Memory Man – Blue Moon Kaboom ===
- 13. "Girls Wanna Do Me, Dudes Wanna Be My Friend" (featuring Youngman)

== 2018 ==
=== MC Paul Barman – (((Echo Chamber))) ===
- 02. "Youngman Speaks on (((Race)))"

== 2020 ==
=== Gorillaz – Song Machine, Season One: Strange Timez ===
- 04. "Pac-Man" (featuring Schoolboy Q)

=== R.A. the Rugged Man – All My Heroes Are Dead ===
- 16. "Life of the Party"

== 2023 ==
=== Handsome Boy Modelling School – Music to Drink Martinis To ===
- 04. "Green Smoothie" (featuring J-Live)
- 05. "The Debut"
