= Just Say Stet =

1985 single by Stetsasonic

- Side A of the US 12-inch vinyl

Single by Stetsasonic

from the album On Fire
- B-side: "Rock De La Stet (Vocal)"
- Released: 1985
- Studio: Tommy Boy Recording
- Genre: Hip hop
- Length: 3:40
- Label: Tommy Boy
- Songwriters: Glenn Bolton; Arnold Hamilton; Paul Huston; Martin Nemley; Leonardo Roman; Marvin Shahid Wright
- Producers: Stetsasonic; Eric Calvi; Robin Halpin

Stetsasonic singles chronology
"Just Say Stet" (1985)	"Go Stetsa I" (1986)

"Just Say Stet" is the debut single by American hip hop group Stetsasonic, released in 1985 via Tommy Boy Records. It was included on their debut album On Fire, released the following year. All members of the group have credits as composers of the song, which they produced in collaboration with Eric Calvi and Robin Halpin as per the liner notes credits.

The song has a production based on electro music. Also in it DBC is credited with playing keyboards and horn, being one of the most remarkable peculiarities of the group that its members play instruments.

In 1999, Ego Trip's editors ranked "Just Say Stet" at No. 10 in their list of Hip Hop's 40 Greatest Singles by Year 1985 in Ego Trip's Book of Rap Lists.

== Conception and composition ==
Prince Paul told Complex in 2011, that he was still attending high school at the time of producing the song:

"I was like 17. I was naïve until the record came out. I was just like, 'Oh, I got a record out.' You know? I never took it seriously. So that’s how my earlier records just randomly came about.(...) I remember the first record getting played on the radio was "Just Say Stet." And I was like freaking out. Like, 'Mom! Check this out!' I was like 18 at the time. First record, first single, and boom it was on WHBI. I really don’t remember who played it, but I remember turning on the radio, and it was like, 'My record’s on. Oh, my God. I have a record on the radio.'"

Though it's labeled "Instrumental", A2 is in fact more like a slightly extended dub version of A1. It ends in a locked groove with the word "Stet" at the end of the final "Just say Stet!" repeating over and over to infinity (The scratched message in the runout groove on Side A references this). Some copies came with a free STET sticker.

== Reception ==
John Leland at Spin said, "This isn’t so much a record as a challenge. Stetsasonic gets inside your shirt and for four minutes threatens to kick your ass. Not in so many words, but the sound of this record is so tough and the raps so aggressive, that it just bullies you into submission."

== Personnel ==
Credits are taken from the liner notes and the official page of the ASCAP.

- Written By – Glenn Bolton, Arnold Hamilton, Paul Huston, Martin Nemley, Leonardo Roman, Marvin Shahid Wright
- Producer – Stetsasonic
- Co-producer – Eric Calvi, Robin Halpin (tracks: A1, A2), Jim Klein (track B)
- Keyboards, Horns – DBC
- Mastered By – Herbie Jr :^)* (Herb Powers Jr.)
- Engineer – Eric Calvi
- Producer (exec.) – Tom Silverman

== Track listing ==
=== 12" vinyl ===
A-side

1. "Just Say Stet" (3:40)
2. "Just Say Stet" (instrumental) (3:44)

B-side

1. "Rock De La Stet" (vocal) (6:30)
