= I'm in the Mood for Love =

1935 popular song by Jimmy McHugh & Dorothy Fields

Song by Frances Langford
- Published: 1935 by Robbins Music
- Composer: Jimmy McHugh
- Lyricist: Dorothy Fields

"I'm in the Mood for Love" is a popular song published in 1935. The music was written by Jimmy McHugh, with the lyrics by Dorothy Fields. The song was introduced by Frances Langford in the movie Every Night at Eight released that year.

It became Langford's signature song. Bob Hope, who frequently worked with Langford entertaining troops in World War II, later wrote that her performance of the song was often a show-stopper.

== Other notable recordings ==
- 1935 Louis Armstrong
- 1935 Leo Reisman and his Orchestra with vocals by Frank Luther.
- 1946 Billy Eckstine — this single release reached No. 12 in the Billboard charts.
- 1951 Erroll Garner — instrumental (earlier informal recording in 1944)
- 1961 The Chimes — reached No. 38 in the Billboard charts.
- 1965 Lord Tanamo recorded a ska version of the song ("I'm in the Mood for Ska") for Ska Beat label. This version reached number 58 on the UK Singles Chart in 1990 for three weeks after being used on the soundtrack of a British TV ad for a brand of food stuffing called Paxo in 1989.
- 1999 Hip-hop artist Prince Paul sampled the song as the basis for the track "Mood for Love" on his album A Prince Among Thieves, with Don Newkirk singing its original lyrics.
- 2000 Jools Holland and His Rhythm & Blues Orchestra featuring Jamiroquai — performed live on Later... with Jools Holland as well as being released as a single as part of the soundtrack for the movie Kevin & Perry Go Large; a music video was released for the song in 2001; it paid tribute to the recently deceased Julie London, who had previously performed the song (albeit in a different arrangement).

== Legacy ==
Wong Kar-wai's acclaimed 2000 romantic drama film In the Mood for Love borrows its English title from the song. Wong had planned to name the film Secrets until listening to the song late in post-production.
