= Lyte as a Rock =

Studio album by MC Lyte
- Released: April 19, 1988
- Recorded: 1987–1988
- Studios: I.N.S. (New York, NY); Such-A-Sound (Brooklyn, NY); First Priority Lab (Staten Island, NY)
- Genre: Golden age hip-hop
- Length: 38:29
- Labels: First Priority; Atlantic 90905
- Producers: Alliance; Audio Two; King of Chill; Prince Paul

MC Lyte chronology
Lyte as a Rock (1988)	Eyes on This (1989)

Singles from Lyte as a Rock
- 1. "I Cram to Understand U (Sam)" Released: November, 1987; 2. "10% Dis" Released: May, 1988; 3. "Paper Thin" Released: 1988; 4. "Lyte as a Rock" Released: 1988

Lyte as a Rock is the debut studio album by American hip hop recording artist MC Lyte. It was released on April 19, 1988, via First Priority and Atlantic Records, and was produced by Audio Two, Prince Paul, and King of Chill and his group, Alliance.

Lyte as a Rock debuted at No. 63 on the May 28, 1988, Top Black Albums chart. On July 9, 1988, the album peaked at No. 50 on the Billboard Top Black Albums, spending 16 weeks on the chart.

The album received critical acclaim and has been considered by music publications as one of the most important rap albums of all time, mainly due to its influence on the subsequent work of other female rappers. In January 1998, Lyte as a Rock was included on The Source's "The 100 Best Rap Albums of All Time" list. The album is broken down track-by-track by MC Lyte in Brian Coleman's book Check the Technique.

== Background ==
In 1987, at the age of 16, Lyte released her debut single, "I Cram to Understand U (Sam)", about drug addiction and its impact on relationships. This was one of the first songs written for the crack era. Lyte has said that she was 12 years old when she wrote it.

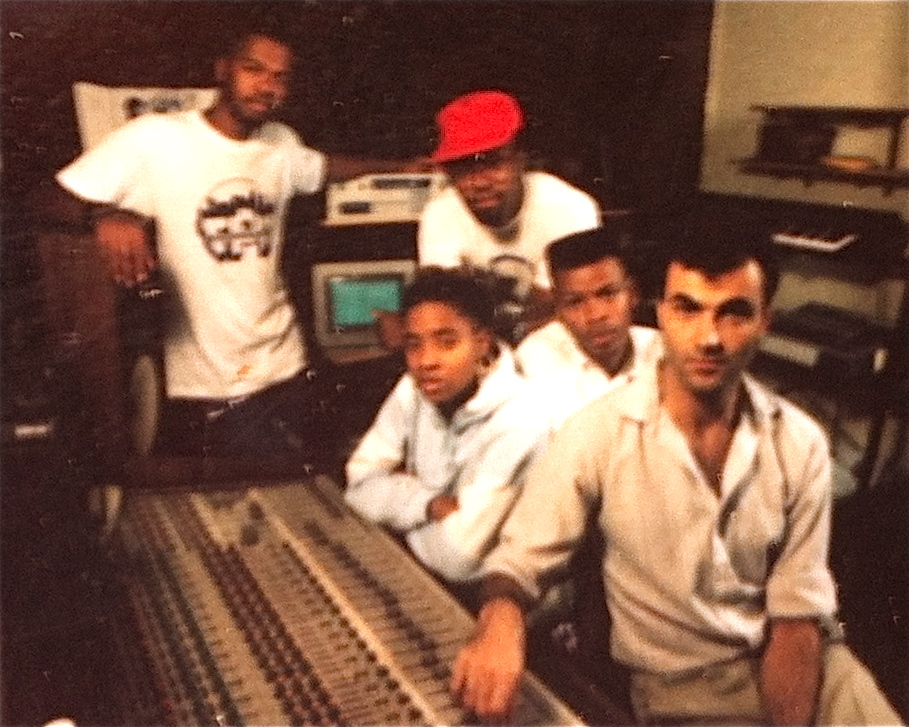
MC Lyte in 1988 at Firehouse Studios in Brooklyn with her producers Gizmo, Milk D and King of Chill and engineer Yoram Vazan.

In 1988, Lyte published her debut album Lyte as a Rock. As well as being one of the first female rap LPs (previously few groups such as Salt-N-Pepa and the Sequence had published), it was the first full album from a female rapper as a solo artist.

== Recording and production ==
In an interview for Okayplayer, Lyte explained that the lyrics on the album were from a rhyming book that she wrote over the course of several years. In an interview with Jet in 2015, Lyte commented on the production of the songs:

“(...) when I was auditioning for the record label, they said, “Okay let’s hear something.” So I just said the poems and they kind of created the music to go around what I had already written… which is why most of the stuff on Lyte As a Rock is not like three verses per song. It’s sorta like, here’s this short little verse and here’s this 24-bar song. Some of them don’t even have hooks. For instance, “Paper Thin.” So it just came from that book of wanting to be prepared for my moment.”

Many of the songs included contributions from the rap duo Audio Two, who had been close to Lyte since childhood, King of Chill and his group Alliance. The track "Mc Lyte Likes Swingin" had Prince Paul of Stetsasonic in production, who later gained recognition for his work with De La Soul.

== Music and lyrics ==
In addition to "I Cram to Understand U", three other songs were released as singles: "10% Dis" (a diss track to then-Hurby Azor associate Antoinette), "Paper Thin" (in which she confronts her boyfriend for an infidelity) and the eponymous "Lyte as a Rock". At the beginning of "I am Woman" Lyte quotes Helen Reddy's hit "I Am Woman" saying "I am woman hear me roar". The last track "Don't Cry, Big Girls" is built around a sample of The Four Seasons' "Big Girls Don't Cry" (1963).

During the MC Lyte tribute at the 2006 VH1 Hip Hop Honors Da Brat and Remy Ma sang the chorus for the track "Kickin' 4 Brooklyn".

"Paper Thin" and "Lyte as a Rock" had music videos directed by Lionel C. Martin.

== Critical reception ==
Professional ratings
Review scores
Source	Rating
AllMusic	4.5/5 stars
MusicHound R&B: The Essential Album Guide	3.5/5 stars
The Philadelphia Inquirer	4/4 stars
The Rolling Stone Album Guide	3.5/5 stars
Spin Alternative Record Guide	7/10
The Village Voice	B

In a rave review for The Philadelphia Inquirer, Ken Tucker wrote that Lyte as a Rock "confirms Lyte's status as an uncommonly smart creator of rhymes and an adept performer of those words." Robert Christgau from The Village Voice was more reserved in his praise, finding that Lyte "knows how to talk tough without yielding to the stupid temptations of macho", but that the album's producers "chill too close to the max as she attempts to carry the music with her bare rap. Even their weirdest hooks are understated by half, and Lyte's quotes (not samples) from 'I'm in the Mood for Love,' 'Big Girls Don't Cry', 'I Am Woman', and 'Hit the Road Jack' aren't loud enough to compensate." Later in 1988, following the album's release, The Village Voice called Lyte "hip-hop's best female vocalist."

== Legacy and influence ==
In retrospect, Rob Theakston of AllMusic commented that "Lyte as a Rock has aged better than most records that came out during hip-hop's formative years, although at certain moments it has become dated since its release. But what has aged is more than compensated by the classic tunes and the disc's potent historical impact on a generation of women MCs. A classic." Trouser Press concluded that "not only is Lyte's assessment of the sexual battlefield a refreshing change of pace, the chip on her shoulder yields cleverly vicious putdowns." PopMatters's Mark Anthony Neal called the album "one of the most underrated debuts in hip-hop history". In February 2008, Rolling Stone included Lyte as a Rock along with other albums such as N.W.A's debut album Straight Outta Compton and Public Enemy's It Takes a Nation of Millions to Hold Us Back on their list of the best albums of 1988, which they considered "Rap's greatest year".

In October 2017 Complex magazine's Michael Gonzales commented "MC Lyte emerged from the depths of Brooklyn caring more about her rhyme skills than her make-up.(...) Homegirl might've been Lyte as a Rock, but her debut album was heavy as a boulder." XXL's Dominique Zonyee considered that with the release of her debut album Lyte "indirectly challenged anyone who said she couldn’t or wouldn’t have success as a rapper." commenting "After that, how could anyone deny women the same opportunities as male rappers. Even with the obvious feminist tone, Lyte did not compromise her lyricism. On so many levels, the rapper's debut has become a pillar of hope for female MCs and has been inspirational in helping other ladies break barriers in the game."

In 2018, on the 30th anniversary of its release, Jesse Ducker of Albumism, wrote "Still sounds as good as it did three decades ago. Lyte demonstrates tremendous verbal ability on Lyte as a Rock, using her husky voice and conversational flow to create wicked rhymes to go along with the neck-snapping beats. She remains “herself” throughout the album, as defiant and confident as any other emcee to ever pick up the microphone. And it's this confidence and sheer skills that carry Lyte as a Rock and makes it as memorable as any album in the formative era of hip-hop." During another review he opined that with the release of Lyte as a Rock Lyte "stood shoulder to shoulder with the Golden Era’s best emcees." In 2019, Kyle Eustice of HipHopDX would commented:

From the moment the first “fresh” is cut on album opener “Lyte Vs. Vanna Wyte,” it’s clear MC Lyte was intent on making a classic New York Hip Hop album via her 1988 debut, Lyte As A Rock. (...) Lyte wasn’t simply leaning on her femininity — she owned it — and refused to fade away into obscurity like some novelty act. She was a serious artist who delivered hard-hitting rhymes, brutally honest content and authentic boom-bap (...) Although the project only peaked at No. 50 on the Billboard R&B/Hip Hop Albums, it helped usher in a whole new era of confident female MCs, including Bahamadia, Queen Latifah and Monie Love.

Simon Pearce of Pitchfork wrote in his album review:

“Groundbreaking and unconfined, the album has a take-on-all-comers bravado buoyed by Lyte’s aerodynamic style. She is unflappable—as cool as Big Daddy Kane, as cerebral as Kool Moe Dee, harder than Salt-N-Pepa but just as cheeky. (...)That monumental chip on her shoulder was a byproduct of all the naysayers claiming women couldn’t rap, and it drove her to outdo everyone: "If a rap can paint a thousand words, then I can paint a million," she proclaims proudly on the title track. This is a record about being a woman in a boys’ club and blowing up the spot with uncompromising attitude. She wasn’t in it to pander to the male gaze, or to play affirmative action girl. She was in it to win.”

=== Accolades ===
Publication	Country	Accolade	Year	Rank
About.com	U.S.	The Greatest Hip-Hop Albums of all Time	2006	82
Complex	U.S.	The Greatest Old School Rap Albums of the '80s	2017	30
Ego Trip	U.S.	Hip Hop's 25 Greatest Albums by Year 1980–98 (1988 list)	1999	13
HipHopDX	U.S.	The 20 Best Rap Albums Of All Time...From Artists Who Just Happen To Be Women	2019	14
NME	UK	25 Albums That Changed Hip-Hop Forever	2013	3
Pitchfork	U.S.	The 200 Best Albums of the 1980s	2018	157
Rolling Stone	U.S.	The 200 Greatest Hip-Hop Albums of All Time	2022	185
Soul In Stereo	U.S.	20 Best Female Rap Albums of All Time	2015	1
The Source	U.S.	100 Greatest Rap Albums of All Time	1998	*
uDiscoverMusic	U.S.	The Best Albums of 1988: 66 Full-Lengths Worth Your Time	2021	49
Yardbarker	U.S.	20 great hip-hop albums from female rappers	2018	*
Yardbarker	U.S.	Drop the mic: 20 hip-hop albums that changed the game	2019	*
(*) designates lists which are unordered.

== Track listing ==
The song writing information is according to the ASCAP website.

No.	Title	Writer(s)	Producer(s)	Length
1.	"Lyte vs. Vanna Whyte"	Lana Moorer; Freddie Byrd	Alliance	2:47
2.	"Lyte as a Rock"	Lana Moorer; Kirk Robinson	Audio Two	4:17
3.	"I am Woman"	Freddie Byrd	King of Chill	2:45
4.	"Mc Lyte Likes Swingin'"	Lana Moorer	Prince Paul	3:17
5.	"10% Dis"	Lana Moorer; Nathaniel Robinson Jr.; Kirk Robinson	Audio Two	5:00
6.	"Paper Thin"	Lana Moorer; Freddie Byrd	King of Chill	5:14
7.	"Lyte thee MC"	Lana Moorer; Freddie Byrd	Alliance	4:13
8.	"I Cram to Understand U (Sam)"	Lana Moorer; Kirk Robinson	Audio Two	4:39
9.	"Kickin' 4 Brooklyn"	Lana Moorer; Kirk Robinson	Audio Two	2:20
10.	"Don't Cry, Big Girls"	Lana Moorer; Kirk Robinson	Audio Two	3:57
Total length:				38:29

=== Sample credits ===
Song title	Sample(s)
"Lyte vs. Vanna Whyte"	"Grease" by Frankie Valli (1978); "Change the Beat (Female Version)" by Fab 5 Betty (1982)
"Lyte as a Rock"	"Sweet Pea" by Tommy Roe (1966); "Solid" by Ashford & Simpson (1984)
"I Am Woman"	"I Am Woman" by Helen Reddy (1972)
"Mc Lyte Likes Swingin'"	"Sing a Simple Song" by Please (1975); "Kool Is Back" by Funk, Inc. (1971); "Don't Tell It" by James Brown (1976); "Cold Sweat" by James Brown (1967); "2001" by the Cecil Holmes Soulful Sounds (1973)
"10% Dis"	"Roxanne's Revenge" by Roxanne Shante (1984); "Impeach the President" by the Honey Drippers (1973); "Top Billin'" by Audio Two (1987); "Super Bad" by James Brown (1970)
"Paper Thin"	"17 Days" by Prince (1984); "Hit the Road Jack" by Ray Charles (1961); "I'm Glad You're Mine" by Al Green (1972); "Shining Star" by Earth, Wind & Fire (1975)
"Lyte thee MC"	"Silly Rabbit, Trix Are for Kids" by the Trix Rabbit and the Trix Kids (1954); "Superstition" by Stevie Wonder (1972); "Outstanding" by the Gap Band (1983)
"I Cram to Understand U (Sam)"	"Ain't We Funkin' Now" by the Brothers Johnson (1978); "I'm in the Mood for Love" by Frances Langford (1935)
"Don't Cry, Big Girls"	"Big Girls Don't Cry" by the Four Seasons (1963); "Drop the Bomb" by Trouble Funk (1982)

== Personnel ==
- Lead vocals – MC Lyte
- Producer, programmed By – Alliance (tracks: 1 and 7), Audio Two (tracks: 2, 5, 8 to 10) King of Chill (3 and 6) and Prince Paul
- Art direction – Bob Defrin
- Design – Carol Bobolts
- Engineer – Dan Sheehan, Gary Clugston, Mike Dee, Phil DeMartino, Shlom Sonnenfeld, Yoram Vazan
- Executive producer – Nat Robinson
- Photography by – John Pinderhughes

== Charts ==
Chart (1988)	Peak position
US Top R&B/Hip-Hop Albums (Billboard)	50
