= The Floaters =

American R&B vocal group

- Origin: Detroit, Michigan
- Genres: R&B, soul
- Years active: 1976–present
- Labels: ABC (1976–78); MCA (1979–80)
- Members: Charles Clark; Kenny Goodman; Dan Goodman; Al Smith
- Past members: James Mitchell; Paul Mitchell; Larry Cunningham; Charles Clark; Ralph Mitchell
- Website: http://www.floatersmusic.com

The Floaters are an American R&B vocal group, from Detroit, Michigan, that formed in 1976. The group are best known for their 1977 song "Float On", which reached No. 2 on the Billboard Hot 100, No. 1 on the UK Singles Chart, and No. 5 on the Irish Singles Chart.

== Career ==
The band was formed by the former Detroit Emeralds' singer James Mitchell, with his brother Paul Mitchell, Larry Cunningham, Charles Clark, and the unrelated Ralph Mitchell. Most of the Floaters were from Northeast Detroit, bordering Hamtramck on Detroit's Eastside.

James Mitchell wrote the band's one major hit, "Float On", with Arnold Ingram and Marvin Willis. The lyrics spotlight each member of the band, who introduced themselves with their name, astrological sign, and ideal type of romantic partner. The song was produced by Woody Wilson. It became a worldwide hit in 1977 on ABC Records, reaching No. 1 on the US R&B chart, No. 2 on the US Billboard Hot 100 chart, and No. 1 in the UK Singles Chart (for a single week in August that year).

Follow-ups such as "You Don't Have to Say You Love Me" (No. 28 Billboard R&B chart) were not as successful. The group continued to record, releasing four studio albums over the next few years.

A new recording of the song "Float On" was recorded in 2001 for the album, Still Standing, by the group Full Force and Cheech & Chong did a take-off of the song called "Bloat On". The rap group Stetsasonic also did a cover of the song on In Full Gear (1988). The characters from Sesame Street, David (Northern Calloway), Bob (Bob McGrath), Gordon (Roscoe Orman) and Luis (Emilio Delgado) did a style parody of the song called "Gimmie Five". British parody group The Barron Knights included a parody of "Float On" in their 1977 hit "Live in Trouble".

This song was also sampled by Canadian hip-hop recording duo Dream Warriors, in their song of the same name.

Larry Cunningham (born on June 23, 1951) died on January 10, 2019, at the age of 67. Paul Mitchell (born on July 27, 1949) died on December 20, 2021, He was 72.

First cousins to Paul Mitchell, brothers Kenny and Dan Goodman joined the group in 2016. Charles Clark returned to the group in 2019, followed by Al Smith. In 2026 the group released "You Are The One", written by Fel Davis, lead singer of Public Announcement, and produced by Byron Woodward. The single premiered at the Roostertail in Detroit on August 30, 2026, and was released digitally on September 1, 2026.

== Discography ==
=== Studio albums ===
Year	Album	Peak chart positions							Certifications	Record label
Year	Album	US	US R&B	AUS	CAN	NL	NZ	UK	Certifications	Record label
1977	Floaters	10	1	28	49	15	36	17	RIAA: Platinum	ABC
1978	Magic	131	27	—	—	—	—	—		ABC
1979	Float into the Future	—	—	—	—	—	—	—		MCA
1981	Get Ready for the Floaters & Shu-Ga	—	—	—	—	—	—	—		Fee / WP
"—" denotes a recording that did not chart or was not released in that territory.

=== Compilation albums ===
- Float On: The Best of the Floaters (1998, Half Moon)

=== Singles ===
Year	Single	Peak chart positions								Certifications	Album
Year	Single	US	US R&B	AUS	CAN	IRE	NLD	NZ	UK	Certifications	Album
1976	"I Am So Glad I Took My Time"	—	—	—	—	—	—	—	—		Floaters
1977	"Float On"	2	1	16	4	5	2	1	1	RIAA: Gold; BPI: Silver	Floaters
1977	"You Don't Have to Say You Love Me"	—	28	—	—	—	—	—	—		Floaters
1978	"I Just Want to Be with You"	—	36	—	—	—	—	—	—		Magic
1978	"The Time Is Now"	—	—	—	—	—	—	—	—		Magic
1979	"Levitation"	—	—	—	—	—	—	—	—		Float into the Future
1981	"For Your Love"	—	—	—	—	—	—	—	—		Get Ready for the Floaters & Shu-Ga
1981	"Get Ready"	—	—	—	—	—	—	—	—		Get Ready for the Floaters & Shu-Ga
2026	"You Are The One"										
"—" denotes a recording that did not chart or was not released in that territory.

== See also ==
- One-hit wonders in the UK
- List of number-one singles from the 1970s (UK)
