= Hip Hop Gold Dust =

Compilation album by Prince Paul
- Released: UK release date: 19 September 2005; US release date: 25 October 2005
- Genre: Hip-hop
- Length: 47:40
- Label: Antidote

Prince Paul chronology
| Itstrumental (2003) | Hip Hop Gold Dust (2005) |

Professional ratings
Review scores
| Source | Rating |
|---|---|
| PopMatters | 5/10 stars |

Hip Hop Gold Dust is a compilation album by American hip-hop producer Prince Paul. The album consists mainly of unreleased Prince Paul tracks from various points in his career. It features songs from his time working with Stetsasonic, De La Soul, Gravediggaz, Resident Alien, and Biz Markie. The song, "Don't Be Afraid of the Dark" by Gravediggaz, only appears on promo copies of the album but was deleted from the track list on the official CD and LP release.

== Track listing ==
1. Soul Brothers – Soul Brothers Intro (unreleased)
2. De La Soul – My Mindstate (Unreleased)
3. Gravediggaz feat Craig Gee – Don't Be Afraid Of The Dark
4. Resident Alien – Shakey Grounds (unreleased)feat Superstar of Horror City
5. Bugg Out Piece – A Fine Day (Pt.1)
6. Groove B Chill – Top Of The Hill
7. Prince Paul – Sucker For Love
8. Resident Alien – Alone (unreleased)
9. Bugg Out Piece – A Fine Day (Pt.2)
10. LA Symphony – Broken Now (unreleased)
11. Prince Paul, Chubb Rock & Biz Markie – No Rubber No Backstage Pass
12. May May – Real Man (unreleased)
13. Justin Warfield – K Sera Sera
14. Gravediggaz – Constant Elevation (unreleased vocal version)
15. Sha Of Horror City – Big Sha (unreleased)
16. The Monolith (unreleased)
17. Gravediggaz – Suicide (remix)
18. Stetsasonic – Stet Live WNYU (unreleased)
19. Prince Paul – Prince Paul vs The World
20. Bugg Out Piece – A Fine Day (conclusion)
