= Breath Control: The History of the Human Beat Box =

- Directed by: Joey Garfield
- Produced by: Joey Garfield; Jacob Craycroft; Zachary Mortensen
- Starring: D.O.A. Doug E. Fresh; Biz Markie; Marie Daulne; Emanon Rahzel; Skratch; Wise; Daddy-O; 4Zone; Kris Jung (AKA Chris Jung)
- Edited by: Jacob Craycroft
- Distributed by: Ghost Robot
- Release date: 2002 (Tribeca Film Festival)
- Running time: 74 min.
- Country: United States
- Language: English

Breath Control: The History of the Human Beat Box (2002) is a documentary directed by filmmaker Joey Garfield. The film explores the world of beatboxing, a form of music using the human mouth, throat and diaphragm to generate sounds that are usually produced by machines. Over 30 practitioners of this artform discuss their techniques and the evolution of their craft. The human beat box is one of the key elements in the development of hip hop culture, alongside DJing, Graffiti, Breakdancing, and MC-ing. As the first documentary of its kind, Breath Control: The History of the Human Beat Box uses interviews, live performances, archival footage, and animation to bring to light this important and neglected ingredient of Hip Hop's identity .

With the help of Beat Box pioneers Doug E. Fresh, Wise, Biz Markie, and The Fat Boys, Breath Control traces this art form from its basic beat beginnings in the eighties to its present-day multi-layered, polyrhythmic figureheads, Rahzel and Skratch of the Hip Hop group The Roots. Breath Control does not limit itself to only hip hop; Musician Zap Mama opens up the idea that human beat boxing is an art form practiced all over the world that has been refined by many different cultures. Breath Control is a half historical, half tutorial look at humans as living instruments.

== See also ==
- Beatbox Battle World Championship
- Grand Beatbox Battle
- Mouth drumming
