= In Full Gear =

Studio album by Stetsasonic
- Released: June 21, 1988
- Genres: Golden age hip-hop; jazz rap; dancehall; rap rock; Miami bass
- Length: 63:31
- Labels: Tommy Boy; Warner Bros.
- Producers: Daddy-O; Prince Paul; DBC

Stetsasonic chronology
On Fire (1986)	In Full Gear (1988)	Blood, Sweat & No Tears (1991)

Singles from In Full Gear
- 1. "Sally" Released: April 15, 1988; 2. "Talkin' All That Jazz" Released: September 16, 1988; 3. "Float On" Released: February 7, 1989

In Full Gear is the second studio album by American hip-hop band Stetsasonic, released in 1988 by Tommy Boy Records.

== Music and lyrics ==
In Full Gear is a double album that draws on various influences in its hip-hop style, including R&B, jazz, dancehall reggae, and rock influences. It also incorporates beat-boxing, sampling technology, and live band performance. "Freedom or Death" and "Talkin' All That Jazz" discuss credos of revolution and sampling, respectively. On "Float On", a remake of the Floaters' 1977 song of the same name, rapper Wise envisions "a woman with a realistic imagination, a woman who thinks for herself, whose thoughts are bold and free".

== Critical reception ==
Professional ratings
Review scores
Source	Rating
AllMusic	5/5 stars
Q	4/5 stars
The Rolling Stone Album Guide	4/5 stars
The Village Voice	B+

In a contemporary review for The Village Voice, music critic Robert Christgau found the "well-meaning" band merely competent musically and said that their cover of "Float On" is "even ickier than the original". He was more enthusiastic about "Freedom or Death" and "Talking All That Jazz", and felt that In Full Gear succeeds on "a camaraderie that reaches deeper than the usual homeboy bonding". In his own list for the Pazz & Jop critics poll, Christgau named "Talkin' All That Jazz" the seventeenth best single of 1988.

== Track listing ==
#	Title	Producer(s)	Performer (s)
1	"In Full Gear"	Prince Paul	Daddy-O, Frukwan, Wise, Delite
2	"DBC Let the Music Play"	DBC	Daddy-O, Frukwan, Wise, Delite
3	"Freedom or Death"	Daddy-O	Daddy-O
4	"Float On"	Vincent F. Bell	Daddy-O, Frukwan, Wise, Delite
5	"Stet Troop '88!"	Wise	Daddy-O, Frukwan
6	"Pen & Paper"	Prince Paul	Daddy-O, Frukwan, Delite
7	"Music for the Stetfully Insane"	Prince Paul	*Instrumental*
8	"We're the Band"	Prince Paul, Daddy-O	Daddy-O, Wise, Frukwan
9	"Rollin' wit Rush"	Prince Paul, Daddy-O	*Interlude*
10	"This Is It, Y'all [Go Stetsa II]"	Daddy-O	Daddy-O, Frukwan, Wise
11	"Extensions"	Daddy-O	*Interlude*
12	"Sally"	Prince Paul	Daddy-O, Delite, Wise
13	"Talkin' All That Jazz"	Prince Paul	Daddy-O, Frukwan, Wise, Delite
14	"It's in My Song"	DBC	Daddy-O, Frukwan, Delite
15	"The Odad"	Daddy-O	Daddy-O
16	"Miami Bass"	Prince Paul, Daddy-O	Daddy-O, Frukwan, Delite
17	"Showtime"	DBC	Wise, Frukwan, Daddy-O, Delite
18	"Talkin' All That Jazz [Dominoes Vocal Remix]"	Daddy-O	Frukwan, Daddy-O, Delite
19	"Talkin' All That Jazz [Dominoes Instrumental Remix]"	Daddy-O	*Instrumental*
20	"Talkin' All That Jazz [Dim's Radio Edit Remix]"	Dimitri	Frukwan, Daddy-O, Delite

== Charts ==
=== Weekly charts ===
Chart (1988)	Peak position
US Top R&B/Hip-Hop Albums (Billboard)	20

=== Year-end charts ===
Chart (1988)	Position
US Top R&B/Hip-Hop Albums (Billboard)	86

=== Singles ===
Year	Song	Chart positions		
Year	Song	R&B	Rap	Dance Sales
1988	"Sally"	25	—	—
1988	"Talkin' All That Jazz"	34	—	25
1989	"Float On"	56	24	—
