= Floaters (album) =

Studio album by The Floaters
- Released: May 1977
- Studio: PAC 3 (Detroit, Michigan); Sound Studio (Detroit, Michigan)
- Genre: Soul, R&B
- Length: 42:05
- Label: ABC
- Producer: James Mitchell, Marvin Willis

The Floaters chronology
Floaters (1977)	Magic (1978)

Professional ratings
Review scores
Source	Rating
AllMusic	3/5 stars

Floaters is the debut studio album recorded by American R&B group The Floaters, released in 1977 on the ABC label.

== Commercial performance ==
The album peaked at No. 1 on the R&B albums chart. It also reached No. 10 on the Billboard 200. The album features the single "Float On", which peaked at No. 1 on the Hot Soul Singles and UK Singles Charts, and No. 2 on the Billboard Hot 100. The single "You Don't Have to Say You Love Me", originally recorded by Dusty Springfield, charted at No. 28 on the Hot Soul Singles chart.

== Track listing ==
All tracks are written by Marvin Willis, Arnold Ingram and James Mitchell, except where noted

Side one
No.	Title	Length
1.	"Float On"	11:49
2.	"You Don't Have to Say You Love Me" (Vicki Wickham, Simon Napier-Bell)	4:53
3.	"Got to Find a Way"	3:47

Side two
No.	Title	Length
4.	"I Bet You Get the One You Love" (Abrim Tilmon, James Mitchell)	3:04
5.	"Everything Happens for a Reason" (Arnold Ingram, James Mitchell)	3:58
6.	"Take One Step at a Time"	4:05
7.	"No Stronger Love"	5:09
8.	"I Am So Glad I Took My Time"	5:20

== Personnel ==
The Floaters

- Larry Cunningham – tenor
- Paul Mitchell – baritone
- Charles Clark – tenor
- Ralph Mitchell – tenor

Musicians

- Kenny Goodman – guitar
- Buster Marbury – drums
- Brimstone Ingram – piano, Fender Rhodes
- Guy Hutson – bass
- Dennis Coffey – guitar, sitar
- Marvin Willis – trumpet
- Larry Nozero – balto saxophone, flute
- Jack Brokensha – vibraphone, bells
- Lorenzo "Bag of Tricks" Brown – congas
- Gary Schunk – clarinet, ARP synthesizer
- Brandye, James Mitchell – background vocals

== Charts ==
Album

Chart (1977)	Peaks
U.S. Billboard Top LPs	10
U.S. Billboard Top Soul LPs	1
Australia (Kent Music Report)	28

Singles

Year	Single	Peaks		
Year	Single	US	US R&B	AUS
1977	"Float On"	2	1	16
1977	"You Don't Have to Say You Love Me"	–	28	–

== See also ==
- List of number-one R&B albums of 1977 (U.S.)
