= Float On (Floaters song) =

1977 single by The Floaters

Single by The Floaters

from the album Floaters
- B-side: "Everything Happens for a Reason"
- Released: June 1977
- Genre: Soul
- Length: 4:13 (Single edit); 11:49 (Album version)
- Label: ABC
- Songwriters: Marvin Willis, Arnold Ingram, James Mitchell
- Producers: James Mitchell, Marvin Willis

"Float On" is a 1977 song by the R&B/soul group the Floaters. The spoken verses combine two popular trends from the time, star signs and video and phone dating, in lines such as Aquarius and my name is Ralph / Now I like a woman who loves her freedom and Cancer and my name is Larry / And I like a woman that loves everything and everybody. The song was co-written by James Mitchell of The Detroit Emeralds.

Released from their self-titled debut album, it became one of the biggest singles of the year, spending six weeks at number one on the U.S. Hot Soul Singles chart. "Float On" was also a crossover hit, peaking at number two on the Billboard Hot 100 behind Andy Gibb's "I Just Want to Be Your Everything" and The Emotions' "Best of My Love", but with no other Hot 100 hits, the Floaters became a one-hit wonder on that chart. "Float On" also reached number one on the UK Singles Chart, and number five on the Irish Singles Chart.

Stetsasonic covered the song on its album In Full Gear (1988). The song was adapted in 1989-1990 to advertise Cadbury's Crème Eggs. A song from Dream Warriors' 1996 album The Master Plan, also titled "Float On", sampled multiple elements of the 1977 song. Full Force released their own version in 2001.

== Parodies ==
The track became a source of parody. Artists who recorded a spoof include:

- English comedy band The Barron Knights on their 1977 UK hit single "Live in Trouble".
- Cheech & Chong on their 1977 US hit single "Bloat On".
- Sesame Street did a style parody of the song in 1977 called "Gimme Five", sung by human characters David (Northern Calloway), Bob (Bob McGrath), Gordon (Roscoe Orman), and Luis (Emilio Delgado).

== Charts ==
Chart (1977)	Peak position
Australia Kent Music Report	16
Belgium (Ultratop 50 Flanders)	5
Canada RPM Top Singles	4
Ireland (IRMA)	5
Netherlands (Single Top 100)	2
New Zealand (Recorded Music NZ)	1
South Africa (Springbok)	13
UK Singles (Official Charts)	1
US Billboard Hot 100	2
US Hot Soul Singles (Billboard)	1
West Germany (GfK)	36

== See also ==
- List of number-one R&B singles of 1977 (U.S.)
