= The Art of Picking Up Women =

EP by The Dix
- Released: March 29, 2005
- Label: Smacks

The Art of Picking Up Women is a 2005 EP by The Dix, a fictitious doo-wop group from the fictional town of Compton, New York, formed by Prince Paul, Mr. Len, Mr. Dead and Don Newkirk. A parody of 1950s/60s doo-wop, the album also has influences of funk, dancehall, downtempo and soul. The record is accompanied by a bonus DVD featuring a mockumentary about the history of the fictional band.

== Track listing ==
| No. | Title | Length |
|---|---|---|
| 1. | "Intro to Women" | 0:23 |
| 2. | "Here Comes the Dix" | 3:29 |
| 3. | "Tears in My Eyes (Dirty Girl)" | 3:49 |
| 4. | "I Luv U Girl" | 3:53 |
| 5. | "When I Come Home to You" | 3:13 |
| 6. | "From the Top" | 2:37 |
| 7. | "Outro to Women" | 40:57 |
