= Itstrumental =

Studio album by Prince Paul
- Released: May 10, 2005
- Genre: Hip-hop
- Length: 47:21
- Label: Female Fun

Prince Paul chronology
Politics of the Business (2003)	Itstrumental (2005)	Hip Hop Gold Dust (2005)

Professional ratings
Review scores
Source	Rating
AllHipHop	3.5/5 stars
IGN	7.5/10
RapReviews	8.5/10
Rolling Stone	3/5 stars
Spin	B+

Itstrumental is the fourth album by hip-hop producer Prince Paul. Similar to other Prince Paul albums, it follows a theme. The album is strung together by a series of skits about the Mental Victims Unit (a play on Law & Order: Special Victims Unit) tracking down and arresting Prince Paul. The album contains songs about, dealing with, or poking fun at Prince Paul's apparently real depression. The album was seen as Prince Paul's return to his classic style after Politics of the Business.

== Track listing ==
1. "MVU (Act 1)"
2. "It's a Stick Up!"
3. "Flattery" (featuring Steinski)
4. "My Friend the Popmaster"
5. "Inside Your Mind" (featuring Mr. Dead & MC Paul Barman)
6. "El Ka Bong"
7. "MVU (Act 2)"
8. "Yes, I Do Love Them Ho's!"
9. "What are You Afraid Of?"
10. "I Want You (I'm an 80's Man)" (featuring Bimos)
11. "Profit"
12. "The Boston Top" (featuring Mr. Dead & Newkirk)
13. "MVU (Act 3)"
14. "And the Winner Is?"
15. "Gangstas My Style"
16. "The Night My Girlfriend Left Me" (featuring MC Paul Barman)
17. "Live @ 5"
18. "MVU (Final Act)"
19. "Think or Die"
