= Blood, Sweat & No Tears =

Studio album by Stetsasonic
- Released: February 5, 1991
- Genre: Hip-hop
- Length: 69:01
- Labels: Tommy Boy; Warner Bros.
- Producers: Prince Paul; Bobby Simmons; Alvin Mooney; Bob Coulter; Norman Cook

Stetsasonic chronology
In Full Gear (1988)	Blood, Sweat & No Tears (1991)	People in the Neighborhood 1991-1994 EP (2016)

Blood, Sweat & No Tears is the third and final album by hip-hop band Stetsasonic.

The CD version replaces the songs "To Whom It May Concern," "Corporate America," and "Do You Remember This?," which were included on the cassette version, with the new tracks "Gyrlz," "Your Mother Has Green Teeth," and "Took Place in East New York."

== Critical reception ==
Professional ratings
Review scores
Source	Rating
AllMusic	4/5 stars
Robert Christgau	(choice cut)
The Encyclopedia of Popular Music	3/5 stars
The Rolling Stone Album Guide	4/5 stars

Trouser Press called Blood, Sweat & No Tears "an engaging state-of-the-art album seamlessly loaded with diverse music, thoughtful and/or amusing raps and more friendly family atmosphere than an Italian wedding." Entertainment Weekly wrote: "The music is pieced together well enough but still scattershot — solid if not innovative beats in one place, an L.L. Cool J-like ballad ('Walkin’ in the Rain') in another, a novelty throwaway or a stark beat somewhere else." The Baltimore Sun praised the "unmistakable ensemble groove."

== Track listing ==
#	Title	Producers	Performers
1	"Hip Hop Band"	Bobby Simmons	*Interlude*
2	"No B.S. Allowed"	Bobby Simmons	Daddy-O, Wise, Delite
3	"Uda Man"	Prince Paul	Daddy-O, Wise, Delite, Aasim, DBC, Bobby Simmons, Prince Paul
4	"Speaking of a Girl Named Suzy"	Bobby Simmons	Daddy-O, Wise, Delite
5	"Gyrlz"	Daddy-O, DBC	Daddy-O, Delite
6	"Blood, Sweat & No Tears"	Prince Paul	Daddy-O, Delite
7	"So Let the Fun Begin"	Daddy-O, Alvin Mooney	Daddy-O, Delite
8	"Go Brooklyn 3"	Bobby Simmons	Daddy-O, Wise, Delite
9	"Walkin' in the Rain"	Bobby Simmons, Daddy-O	Daddy-O, Wise, Delite
10	"Don't Let Your Mouth Write a Check Your Ass Can't Cash"	Daddy-O	Daddy-O, Delite
11	"Ghetto Is the World"	Daddy-O	Daddy-O, Wise, Delite
12	"Your Mother Has Green Teeth"	Prince Paul	Prince Paul
13	"You Still Smokin' That Shit?"	Bob Coulter	Daddy-O
14	"Heaven Help the M.F.'s"	DBC	Daddy-O, Wise, Delite
15	"Took Place in East New York"	Wise, Daddy-O	Wise
16	"Paul's a Sucker"	Prince Paul	*Instrumental*
17	"Free South Africa [Remix]"	Stetsasonic, Norman Cook	Daddy-O, Wise, Delite

== Charts ==
Chart (1991)	Peak position
Billboard Top R&B Albums	75
