= Psychoanalysis: What Is It? =

Studio album by Prince Paul
- Released: June 25, 1996
- Genre: Hip-hop, trip hop
- Length: 47:29 (1996 release); 59:13 (1997 re-release)
- Label: Wordsound, Tommy Boy
- Producer: Prince Paul

Prince Paul chronology
Psychoanalysis: What Is It? (1996)	A Prince Among Thieves (1999)

Singles from Psychoanalysis: What Is It?
- 1. "Booty Clap" Released: 1996

Alternate cover
- 1997 re-release

Psychoanalysis: What Is It? is the debut studio album by American hip-hop producer Prince Paul. Originally released by Wordsound Recordings in 1996, it was re-released by Tommy Boy Records in 1997 with a slightly different track listing and a different cover.

== Critical reception ==
Professional ratings
Review scores
Source	Rating
AllMusic	3/5 stars
Entertainment Weekly	B+
RapReviews	9/10
(The New) Rolling Stone Album Guide	3.5/5 stars
Spin	8/10
The Village Voice	A−

The Atlanta Journal-Constitution wrote that Paul "unleashes his cynical wit and beat-making abilities to a sometimes unsettling effect." The New York Times said that Paul "unwinds and lets his somewhat puerile mind wander."

In 2012, it was listed by Complex as one of the "50 Albums That Were Unfairly Hated On". In 2015, Fact named it the 34th-best trip-hop album of all time.

== Track listing ==
1996 release
No.	Title	Length
1.	"Introduction to Psychoanalysis (Schizophrenia)"	2:00
2.	"Beautiful Night (Manic Psychopath)"	4:26
3.	"Open Your Mouth (Hypothalamus)"	0:56
4.	"You Made Me (A.K.C.)"	4:45
5.	"Vexual Healing (Vacillation)"	3:27
6.	"To Get a Gun"	1:11
7.	"J.O.B. – Das What Dey Is!"	3:43
8.	"The World's a Stage (A Dramady)"	3:21
9.	"Booty Clap"	3:59
10.	"The Bitch Blues (Life Experiences)"	2:20
11.	"In Your Mind (Altered States)"	3:20
12.	"Drinks (Escapism)"	3:31
13.	"Psycho Linguistics (Convergent Thought)"	1:38
14.	"That's Entertainment!? (Aversive Conditioning)"	3:43
15.	"Outroduction to Diagnosis Psychosis"	4:37
Total length:		47:29

1997 re-release
No.	Title	Length
1.	"Why Must You Hate Me?"	2:05
2.	"Beautiful Night (Manic Psychopath)"	4:26
3.	"Open Your Mouth (Hypothalamus)"	0:56
4.	"Introduction to Psychoanalysis (Schizophrenia)"	2:00
5.	"You Made Me (A.K.C.)"	4:45
6.	"Vexual Healing (Vacillation)"	3:27
7.	"To Get a Gun"	1:11
8.	"J.O.B. – Das What Dey Is!"	3:43
9.	"The World's a Stage (A Dramady)"	3:21
10.	"Booty Clap"	3:59
11.	"Drinks (Escapism)"	3:31
12.	"Dimepieces"	4:16
13.	"In Your Mind (Altered States)"	3:20
14.	"2 B Blunt (A True Story)"	3:55
15.	"Psycho Linguistics (Convergent Thought)"	1:38
16.	"That's Entertainment!? (Aversive Conditioning)"	3:43
17.	"Outroduction to Diagnosis Psychosis"	4:37
18.	"Beautiful Night (Automator Remix)"	4:20
Total length:		59:13
