= A Prince Among Thieves =

Studio album by Prince Paul
- Released: February 23, 1999
- Recorded: 1997–1998
- Studios: Paul's Coffee Shop (Long Island, New York)
- Genre: Hip-hop
- Length: 77:11
- Labels: Tommy Boy/Warner Bros. 01210
- Producer: Prince Paul

Prince Paul chronology
Psychoanalysis: What Is It? (1996)	A Prince Among Thieves (1999)	Politics of the Business (2003)

Professional ratings
Review scores
Source	Rating
AllMusic	4.5/5 stars
Chicago Sun-Times	4/4 stars
Los Angeles Times	3/4 stars
NME	8/10
Pitchfork	8.7/10
Rolling Stone	3/5 stars
The Rolling Stone Album Guide	4.5/5 stars
The Source	4/5 stars
Spin	9/10
The Village Voice	A

A Prince Among Thieves is the second studio album by hip-hop artist Prince Paul. A Prince Among Thieves was well received by music critics. Music essayist Robert Christgau has called it "the closest thing to a true rock opera you've ever heard".

== Background ==
The concept follows the story of an aspiring young emcee named Tariq, played by emcee Breezly Brewin, who needs to collect money to record a demo tape before a meeting with Wu-Tang Clan leader RZA. The story follows a desperate Tariq, who skips work at his low-paying job and turns to his friend True, played by emcee Big Sha, who introduces him to drug dealing. The two make their way through the drug world, a police ambush, jail, and, finally, a deadly showdown.

The album features cameos by Kool Keith, Big Daddy Kane, Chubb Rock, Biz Markie, De La Soul, Everlast, Sadat X, Xzibit, Kid Creole, Special Ed, Chris Rock, RZA and Buckshot.

While recording, Prince Paul tried to get Vanilla Ice to appear on the album, delivering a verse as one of the convicts in the jail scene, but was turned down by Ice's manager.

A single version and video in the style of a film trailer was also produced. Although conceived as a story that would be filmed, a movie never came about. In a 2013 interview, Prince Paul said:

"That was the intention. When I first made it, I was inspired by Master P's I'm Bout It. I was like, 'This movie is so poorly shot, and it's popular. I could do that with more star power.' I tried to pitch it to Tommy Boy, and they apparently didn't see the vision. I was like, 'We could make so much money', but they were like 'Yeah, yeah Paul, we're going to put this million dollars in' whatever group that they had. Then at some point Chris Rock bought the rights to it, but he didn't do anything with it. So it sits and it sits. If I had the opportunity, if somebody said, 'Hey, I have a small budget', or wanted to get a Kickstarter going, I'd love to put that together."

== Track listing ==
#	Title	Producer(s)	Performer (s)	Length
1	"Tariq's Dilemma (Intro)"		*Interlude*	0:38
2	"Pain"	Prince Paul	Sha, Breeze	2:14
3	"How It All Started"		*Interlude*	1:19
4	"Steady Slobbin'"	Prince Paul	Breeze	2:55
5	"Just Another Day"		*Interlude*	2:19
6	"What U Got (The Demo)"	Prince Paul	Sha, Breeze	2:29
7	"The Hustles On"		*Interlude*	1:38
8	"MC Hustler"	Prince Paul	Horror City	3:51
9	"The Call"		*Interlude*	0:52
10	"The Other Line"	Prince Paul	Breeze, Heroine	2:51
11	"Crazy Lou's Hideout"		*Interlude*	1:49
12	"Weapon World"	Prince Paul	Kool Keith	3:27
13	"My Big Chance"		*Interlude*	1:54
14	"War Party"	Prince Paul	Horror City	3:10
15	"Count Macula"		*Interlude*	0:22
16	"Macula's Theory"	Prince Paul	Big Daddy Kane	2:36
17	"Mr. Large"	Prince Paul	Chubb Rock, Biz Markie	1:06
18	"Can You Handle It"		*Interlude*	0:21
19	"Put the Next Man On"	Prince Paul	Breeze, Sha, Superstar	3:46
20	"I Was In"		*Interlude*	0:41
21	"My First Day"		*Interlude*	2:29
22	"More Than U Know"	Prince Paul	De La Soul	4:24
23	"Room 69"		*Interlude*	1:49
24	"Mood for Love"	Prince Paul	Newkirk, Sweet Dee, Breeze	3:16
25	"The Bust"		*Interlude*	0:45
26	"The Men in Blue"	Prince Paul	Everlast	3:33
27	"Central Booking"		*Interlude*	2:04
28	"Handle Your Time"	Prince Paul	Sadat X, Xzibit, Kid Creole	3:53
29	"The Rev"		*Interlude*	0:29
30	"Sermon"		*Interlude*	1:01
31	"Showdown"		*Interlude*	2:56
32	"You Got Shot"	Prince Paul	Sha, Breeze	3:07
33	"Every Beginning Must Have an Ending"		*Interlude*	1:43
34	"The New Joint (DJ's Delite)"		*Interlude*	0:56
35	"A Prince Among Thieves"	Prince Paul	Sha	4:42

Sample credits

- "Pain" samples "Pain" by The Watts Prophets.
- "Steady Slobbin'" samples "Reach Out" by Average White Band.
- "What U Got" samples "I'll Play the Blues for You" by Albert King.
- "The Other Line" samples "You Better Get It" by Joe Tex.
- "Weapon World" samples "Get Outta My Life Woman" by The New Apocalypse.
- "War Party" samples "Love Without Sex" by Gwen McCrae.
- "Macula's Theory" samples "Wind, Blow Her Back My Way" by Syl Johnson.
- "More Than U Know" samples "I Like It (Corn Flakes) by Extra T's.
- "Mood for Love" samples "Impeach the President" by The Honeydrippers.
- "The Men in Blue" samples "Synthetic Substitution" by Melvin Bliss.
- "Handle Your Time" samples "Having You Around" by Skull Snaps and "Why Can't People Be Colors Too?" by The Whatnauts.
- "You Got Shot" sample "Midnight Theme" by Manzel and "Brooklyn Zoo" by Ol' Dirty Bastard.

== Personnel ==
=== The cast ===
- Tariq: Breezly Brewin
- True: Big Sha
- Mother: Monkey
- Officer O'Maley Bitchkowski: Everlast
- Crazy Lou: Kool Keith
- Mr. Large: Chubb Rock
- Mr. Large Security: Ken (Special K) Spellman
- Breakneck: Special Ed
- Diehard: Biz Markie
- Hooker: Sweet Dee
- Crackhead: Chris Rock
- Crackhead Girl: Queen Bee
- RZA: Himself
- Count Macula: Big Daddy Kane
- The Reverend: Dom Dom
- Convicts: Sadat X, Xzibit, Kid Creole
- Buckshot: Himself
- Thug Group: Horror City
- Paramedic 1: Rodd Houston
- Paramedic 2: Wendy Day
- Tariq's Sister (Starkeisha): Karima
- Police Officer 2: Phil Painson
- Police Captain: Danny Madorski
- Wu Receptionist: Kamala Gordon
- Tammy: Heroine
- Customers: De La Soul

=== The DJs and VJs ===
- DJ Evil Dee
- Bobbito
- DJ Mecca
- Bobby Simmons
- Andre (Bless Me) Smith
- Ken (Special K) Spellman
- DJ Atlas
- Artist
- Lynn Gonzales
- Rotimi Rainwater

=== Background extras ===
- Michelle Willems
- Patty Santos
- Faradina Lael
- Jackie Martinez
- Shara
- Queen
- Big Pat
- The Deadly Snakes
- Bobby Simmons
- Regina Moore
- Lady Leo
- Mel Vives
- Mr. Dead
- Don Newkirk
- Bimos
- Michael Preston
- Richard Preston
- Nyce
- Edward Huston
- El-P

== Charts ==
Album

Chart (1999)	Peak position
US Billboard 200	138
US Top R&B/Hip-Hop Albums	46
US Top Heatseekers	5

Singles

Year	Song	Hot Rap Singles
1999	"More Than U Know"	45
