= Politics of the Business =

Studio album by Prince Paul
- Released: May 6, 2003
- Genre: Hip-hop
- Label: Razor & Tie
- Producer: Prince Paul

Prince Paul chronology
A Prince Among Thieves (1999)	Politics of the Business (2003)	Itstrumental (2005)

Professional ratings
Aggregate scores
Source	Rating
Metacritic	65/100
Review scores
Source	Rating
Allmusic	3/5 stars
Blender	2/5 stars
Neumu	5/10
Pitchfork	5.1/10
RapReviews	7/10
Rolling Stone	3/5 stars
Spin	C+
Uncut	5/5

Politics of the Business is the third album by American hip-hop producer Prince Paul. This album is considered to be a concept album similar to A Prince Among Thieves. The concept for this album, however, is the concept of following-up a concept album that did not sell too well (that album being A Prince Among Thieves). The album features guest appearances from Ice-T, DJ Jazzy Jeff, MF Doom, Biz Markie, Chuck D, Dave Chappelle, Chris Rock, and more. In October 2017, Paul released an updated version of Politics of the Business titled The Redux for free on SoundCloud and Bandcamp. Among the new featured guests on The Redux are De La Soul, RZA, and Bumpy Knuckles.

== Track listing ==
All production by Prince Paul (producer) except for Track 15 by Prince Paul, DJ A. Vee, Harry Allen, and Mr. Len.

Track listing for Politics of the Business (2003)
No.	Title	Writer(s)	Performer(s)	Length
1.	"A Day in the Life"	P. Huston, D. Chappelle, B. Thompson	Bel Thompson (voice), Dave Chappelle (voice)	1:37
2.	"Popmaster Intro"	P. Huston	Popmaster	0:51
3.	"Make Room"	P. Huston; E. Sermon, J. Phillips, S. Scott	Erick Sermon (rap), Mally G (rap), Sy Scott (rap), Ryan McKnite (vocals), Starr Struk (vocals)	2:01
4.	"The Drive By"	P. Huston	Bimos (voice), Ryan McKnite (voice)	2:01
5.	"So What"	P. Huston, D. Clear, J. Long, C. Mann	Masta Ace (rap), Pretty Ugly (rap), Kokane (vocals)	4:44
6.	"Drama Queen"	P. Huston, D. Jolicoeur, S. Preston	Dave (rap), Truth Enola (rap), Jonene Nelson (vocals)	4:51
7.	"Not Tryin' To Hear That/Words (Album Leak)"	P. Huston, K. Elam, J. Green	Guru (rap), Planet Asia (rap), DJ A. Vee (scratches), Wordsworth (rap)	2:49
8.	"Politics of the Business"	P. Huston, C. Ridenhour, T. Marrow	Chuck D (voice), Ice-T (voice)	1:43
9.	"Crhyme Pays/Ralph Nader"	P. Huston, J. Tineo, L. Fernandez, R. Smith, J. Hernandez	The Beatnuts (rap), Tash (rap), Tony Touch (rap), Starr Struk (vocals), Biz Markie (voice), Mr. Len	4:32
10.	"What I need"	P. Huston, J. Harrow, T. Martin	Kardinal Offishall (rap), Sly Boogy (rap)	3:59
11.	"Princepaulonline.com/The Word"	P. Huston	Austin (voice), Carolyn Williams (voice), Chris Rock (voice), DJ Jazzy Jeff (voice), Jonene Nelson (voice), The Lord Pink Velour (voice), Mr. Len (voice), Prince Paul Jr. (voice), DJ Premier (voice); Jonene Nelson (voice)	1:44
12.	"Controversial Headlines AKA Champion Sound, Pt. 1/My Bookie"	P. Huston, R. Hamilton, R. Lewis	Horror City (rap)	6:02
13.	"Beautifully Absurd"	P. Huston, K. Alyn, W. Felton	W. Ellington Felton (vocals), DJ A. Vee (scratches), K'Alyn (guitar), Jennifer Birsamyn Nuenafe (violin)	5:23
14.	"Controversial Headlines AKA Champion Sound, Pt. 2"	P. Huston, R. Hamilton, R. Lewis, T. Ibrahim	Horror City (rap), Jean Grae (rap)	2:16
15.	"Chubb Rock Please Pay Paul His $2200 You Owe Him (People, Places, and Things)"	P. Huston, D. Dumile, R. Simpson, V. Johnson	Chubb Rock (rap), MF Doom (rap), Wordsworth (rap)	4:06
16.	"A Life in the Day/, Crhyme Pays [Original Mix]/, The Way My Life Seems"	P. Huston, J. Tineo, L. Fernandez, R. Smith, J. Hernandez	Dave Chappelle (voice) [A], The Beatnuts (rap) [B], Tash (rap) [B], Tony Touch (rap) [B], Black Ice (rap) [C], The Pharcyde (rap) [C]	14:51

== Personnel ==
Producers
Producers	Prince Paul, DJ A. Vee, Harry Allen, Mr. Len
Executive producer	Prince Paul
Performers
Lead vocals and rapping	Erick Sermon, Mally G, Sy Scott, Ryan McKnite, Starr Struk, Masta Ace, Pretty Ugly, Kokane, Dave, Truth Enola, Guru, Planet Asia, The Beatnuts, Tash, Tony Touch, Kardinal Offishall, Sly Boogy, Horror City, W. Ellington Felton, K'Alyn, Jean Grae, Chubb Rock, MF Doom, Wordsworth
Additional and background vocals	Bel Thompson, Dave Chappelle, Popmaster, Bimos, Jonene Nelson, Wordsworth, Chuck D, Ice-T, Biz Markie, Mr. Len, Austin, Carolyn Williams, Chris Rock, DJ Jazzy Jeff, The Lord Pink Velour, Prince Paul Jr., DJ Premier
Instrumentation	Jennifer Birsamyn Buenafe (violin), K'Alyn (guitar), DJ A. Vee (scratching)
Technicians
Mixing	Prince Paul
Engineering	Prince Paul
Mastering	Tom Coyne
Arrangements	Prince Paul
