= Don Newkirk =

American record producer (1967 – 2022)

Donald Newkirk (1966 or 1967 – November 2022) was an American musician, composer, and record producer.

Newkirk appeared on several hip hop records including the remix to "Say No Go" by De La Soul and Stetsasonic's "Talking All That Jazz". In October 1989, Newkirk released his solo album, Funk City, on Russell Simmons' OBR/Columbia Records (a subsidiary of Def Jam Records). Not long after, Newkirk released the single "Small Thing". Although it was not included on Funk City, it was included on the soundtrack to the film Livin Large. Although his releases are few in number, Newkirk wrote, produced and sang all the songs. Russell Simmons encouraged Newkirk to put together his second album for OBR/DefJam. His Southmore album entitled Between Love & Lust was recorded in 1992, but before it could be released, the DefJam label was sold and the project never came out. In 2021, Newkirk renamed the project Nostalgia and released the 1992 recordings, making them available on all streaming platforms.

In 2020, Newkirk and Prince Paul composed the score for the documentary, Who Killed Malcolm X, available on Netflix. The duo also composed the score to The Best Thief In the World starring Mary-Louise Parker which came out in 2004; the original score for Louis C.K.-directed comedy film Pootie Tang; as well as the score for the independent film, Pressure Cooker. Together they also composed the score and theme song for the podcast Mogul: The Life & Death of Chris Lighty for Gimlet Media. The two also contributed to the Grammy Award winning Chris Rock album, Never Scared (2005). Another collaboration with Prince Paul is Baby Elephant, a collaboration with Parliament and Talking Heads keyboardist Bernie Worrell. An album Turn My Teeth Up!, released in September 2007, featured George Clinton, Shock G, Yellowman, Reggie Watts, Nona Hendryx, David Byrne, and Gabby La La.

His death was announced via his sister, Olivia Harris, who wrote that he died suddenly on November 25, 2022, at the age of 55.

He also appeared in the music video for "The Gas Face" by 3rd Bass.
