= Daddy-O (rapper) =

American rapper (born 1961)

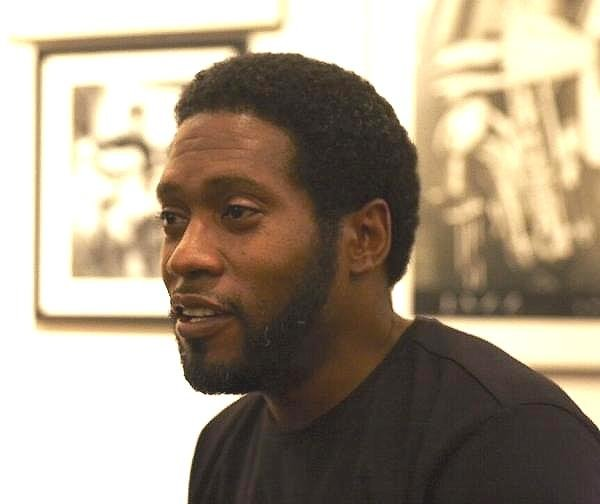
- Daddy-O in 2010

Background information
- Born: Glenn Kareem Bolton; February 20, 1961 (age 65); East New York, Brooklyn, U.S.
- Genres: East Coast hip-hop
- Years active: 1981–present
- Labels: Island; PolyGram; Tommy Boy; Odad Truth
- Member of: Stetsasonic

Glenn Kareem Bolton (born February 20, 1961) widely known as Daddy-O, is an American rapper and record producer. He began his career as a founding member of hip-hop group Stetsasonic, and is known for his pioneering use of sampling.

== Career ==
In 1981, Daddy-O began his career as the lead member of the band Stetsasonic, which included Prince Paul, in Brooklyn, New York. He produced and remixed songs for musical acts such as Mary J. Blige, Queen Latifah, Red Hot Chili Peppers, The B-52's, Jeffrey Osborne, Chante Moore, and Lil' Kim.

From 1994 to 1998, he was a Senior Director for MCA Records. After leaving MCA, he worked for Motown Records and various other entertainment agencies, where he helped to produce and discover talent. Other acts with which he has been associated include Sonic Youth, Sublime, Barry White, They Might Be Giants, Camron, Pizzicato 5, and Third World.

In 2015, Daddy-O joined the CloudSpray team as a management and marketing consultant. In 2016, Daddy-O and his partner Lion Lindwedel (founder of True School Entertainment) formed their co-owned label, Odad Truth Records. He released his solo albums on the OTR Label with digital distribution on Chuck D's distribution company SpitDigital. The first release was #EverybodyButKRS, followed in February 2016 with The Odad, the Gun, & the Children, El Dolor De Las Calles, No Tablecloths in 2018, From My Hood 2 U in 2019, and the most recent solo release of G.O.A.T. Antidote in 2020.

== Discography ==
=== Albums ===
- You Can Be a Daddy, But Never Daddy-O (1993)

=== Stetsasonic (As Daddy-O) ===
- On Fire (1986)
- In Full Gear (1988)
- Blood, Sweat & No Tears (1991)
- People In The Neighborhood EP/ Chopped Herring Records (1991)
- Here We Go Again (2021)

=== Professor Daddy-O ===
- You Can Be a Daddy, But Never Daddy-O (1993)
- #EverybodyButKRS (2015)
- The Odad, The Gun, & The Children (2016)
- El Dolor de las Calles (2016)
- No Tablecloths (2018)
- From My Hood 2 U (2019)
- G.O.A.T. Antidote (2020)

=== Singles ===
Brooklyn Bounce (1993)

=== Stetsasonic (As Daddy-O) ===
- "Just Say Stet" (1985)
- "Go Stetsa 1" (1986)
- "Faye/Forever My Beat" (1986)
- "A.F.R.I.C.A. (1986)
- "Sally" (1988)
- "Talkin' All That Jazz" (1988)
- "No B.S. Allowed" (1991)
- "(Now Ya'll Givin' Up) Love" (2020)

=== Professor Daddy-O ===
- "Flowin' in File" (1993)
- "Brooklyn Bounce" (1993)
- "Psychedelic Sally" (2015)
- "MCee" (2015)
- "Graffiti" (2015)
- "Method of My Madness" (feat. Chuck D) (2015)
- "Blood Got Shot (Now The Blues Got Me)" (2016)
- "Trunkfullafunk" (2016)
- "Bullets" (2016)
- "Shootin Like A Beatbox" (feat. SG) (2018)
- "Haiti" (feat. Marsha Bolton) (2018)
- "A Letter to T.I." (2019)
- "From My Hood 2 U" (feat. Posdnous of De La Soul) (2019)
- "Be YrSELF" (Maxi-Single) (2020)
- "Odad Truth" (feat. DJ King Shameek) (2020)
- "Crooklyn Dodgers 4 (feat. Thirstin Howl III, Indigo Phoenyx) (2020)

=== Credits ===
- On Fire - Stetsasonic / Tommy Boy Records (1986) Writer, Producer, Vocals
- A.F.R.I.C.A./Free South Africa - Stetsasonic/Tackhead / Tommy Boy Records(1987) Writer/Vocals
- I Cram to Understand U (Sam)/Take It Lyte - MC Lyte / First Priority Records(1987) Mixing
- Top Billin' (Remix)/The Freshest Slowest Jam - Audio Two / First Priority Records(1987) Producer
- Coolin' in Cali - The 7A3 / Geffen Records (1988) Producer, Editing, Composer
- Float On/Showtime - Stetsasonic / Tommy Boy (1988) Remixer, Mixing, Vocals
- In Full Gear - Stetsasonic / Tommy Boy (1988) Producer, Mixing, Writer, Percussion, Vocals
- Rhyme Syndicate Comin' Through - Various Artists / Warner Records (1988) Producer
- Sally/DBC Let The Music Play - Stetsasonic / Tommy Boy Records (1988) Producer, Co-Producer, Writer, Vocals
- Talkin' All That Jazz - Stetsasonic / Tommy Boy Records (1988) Additional Producer, Remixer, Producer, Writer, Vocals
- FFRR - Silver on Black / FFRR Records (1989) Producer
- All Hail The Queen - Queen Latifah / Tommy Boy Records (1989) Producer
- I Ain't Making It - Stetsasonic / Warner Records (1989) Producer, Writer, Vocals
- Journey - Jabulani / Giant Records (1992) Producer
- Love's Taken Over (Remix) - Chante Moore / MCA Records (1992) Producer
- Third World: Reggae Ambassadors - Third World / Island Records (1994) Producer
- Forbidden Love - Third World / Island Records(1994) Producer
- II - Boyz II Men / Motown (1994) Writer
- All Hail The Queen - Queen Latifah / Tommy Boy Records (1989) Producer, Mixing
- Istanbul (Not Constantinople) - They Might Be Giants / Elektra (1990) Remixer
- Justifier / Taste - Big Pig / White Label Records (1990) Producer
- Nubian M.O.B. - Nubian M.O.B. / Cold Chillin' Records (1992) Producer
- Real Love - Mary J. Blige / Uptown Records (1992) Remixer
- You Can Be A Daddy, But Never Daddy-O - Professor Daddy-O / Island Records (1993) Producer, Co-Producer, Writer, Vocals
- CB4 (motion picture soundtrack) - Various Artists / MCA (1993) Lyrics, Assistant Producer, Performer
- Innercity Griots - Freestyle Fellowship / 4th & Broadway (1993) Producer, Vocal Arrangements, Engineer, Mixing
- Third World: Reggae Ambassadors - Third World / Island Records (1994) Guest Performer
- Talkin' All That Jazz (Remixes) - Stetsasonic / Tommy Boy Records (1998) Remixer, Writer, Vocals
- Under The Covers: Essential Red Hot Chili Peppers - Red Hot Chili Peppers / EMI Records (1998) Remixer
- Happy End of You (Remixes) - Pizzicato Five / Matador (1998) Remixer
- Confessions of Fire - Cam'ron / Epic Records (1998) Producer
- Shootin Like a Beatbox EP - Professor Daddy-O / SplitSLAM Record Label Group (2018) Producer, Writer, Vocals
- From My Hood 2 U - Professor Daddy-O / The SpitSlam Record Label Group (2019) Executive Producer, Writer, Vocals
- G.O.A.T. Antidote - Professor Daddy-O / The SpitSLAM Record Label Group (2020) Writer, Executive Producer, Vocals
- Here We Go Again - Stetsasonic (2021) Writer, Producer, Vocals

=== Guest appearances ===
- Self Destruction - The Stop The Violence Movement / Jive Records (1989)
- I Ain't Making It - Stetsasonic / Warner Records (1989)
- The Pros - Queen Latifah / Tommy Boy Records (1989)
- Gotta Be A Better Way - Foster McElroy / Atlantic (1989)
- Nubian M.O.B. - Nubian M.O.B. / Cold Chillin' Records (1992)
- Freestyle Fellowship - "Inner City Boundaries" from Innercity Griots (1993)
- Forbidden Love - Third World / Island Records(1994)
- The Conjuring - Indigo Phoenyx x P.A.Dre (2020)
- Loud Is Not Enough - Enemy Radio / The SpitSLAM Record Label Group (2020)
- Drugz - Andre Nickatina / 75 Girls Records (2020)
- What You Gonna Do When the Grid Goes Down? - Public Enemy / Def Jam Records (2020)
