= On Fire (Stetsasonic album) =

Studio album by Stetsasonic
- Released: 1986
- Genre: Rap
- Labels: Tommy Boy; Warner Bros.
- Producer: Stetsasonic

Stetsasonic chronology
On Fire (1986)	In Full Gear (1988)

Singles from "Lyte as a Rock"
- 1. "Just Say Stet" Released: 1985; 2. "Faye/Forever My Beat" Released: April 24, 1987; 3. "Go Stetsa I" Released: August 12, 1987

On Fire is the debut album by the American hip-hop band Stetsasonic. It was released in 1986 via Tommy Boy Records. It was released on compact disc for the first time in 2001, with three bonus tracks.

== Production ==
On Fire was one of the first rap albums to combine live band instrumentation with traditional hip-hop production.

== Critical reception ==
Professional ratings
Review scores
Source	Rating
AllMusic	3/5 stars
The Encyclopedia of Popular Music	3/5 stars
The Rolling Stone Album Guide	3/5 stars

Trouser Press wrote that "the sound of On Fire is hard and spare: one-at-a-time raps over rhythm tracks (including human beat box noises) with sporadic bits of music added." The Washington Post thought that "Stetsasonic does the now-traditional rap/metal duel on 'Rock De La Stet' and cops a reggae rhythm occasionally, but the sextet is at its best when it simply sets out to 'Bust That Groove'."

In 1998, the album was selected as one of The Source's 100 Best Rap Albums.

== Track listing ==
#	Title	Producer(s)	Performer(s)
1	"4 Ever My Beat"	Stetsasonic	Frukwan, Daddy-O, Delite
2	"My Rhyme"	Stetsasonic	Frukwan, Daddy-O, Delite
3	"Just Say Stet"	Stetsasonic	Frukwan, Daddy-O, Delite
4	"Faye"	Stetsasonic	Daddy-O
5	"4 Ever My Mouth"	Stetsasonic	*Interlude*
6	"Rock de la Stet"	Stetsasonic	Frukwan, Daddy-O, Delite
7	"Go Stetsa I"	Stetsasonic	Frukwan, Daddy-O, Delite
8	"On Fire"	Stetsasonic	Frukwan, Daddy-O, Delite
9	"Bust That Groove"	Stetsasonic	Frukwan, Daddy-O, Delite
10	"Paul's Groove"	Stetsasonic	Daddy-O
11	"4 Ever My Beat [Beat Bongo Mix]"	Stetsasonic	Frukwan, Daddy-O, Delite
12	"Go Stetsa I [Remix]"	Stetsasonic	Frukwan, Daddy-O, Delite
13	"A.F.R.I.C.A. [Norman Cook Remix]"	Stetsasonic	Frukwan, Daddy-O, Delite

== Charts ==
Chart (1987)	Peak position
Billboard Top R&B Albums	32
