= Stetsasonic =

American hip-hop group

- Origin: Brooklyn, New York City, U.S.
- Genre: Hip-hop
- Years active: 1981–1992; 2008–present
- Labels: Tommy Boy; Warner Bros.
- Members: Prince Paul (Paul Edward Huston); MC Delite (Marvin Shahid Wright); Wise The Human Mix Machine (Leonardo Roman); Daddy-O (Glenn K. Bolton); Bobby Simmons
- Past members: Frukwan (Arnold Hamilton); DBC (Martin J Namley); Crown Supreme

Stetsasonic is an American hip-hop group. Formed in 1981 in Brooklyn, New York City, New York, Stetsasonic was one of the first hip-hop acts to perform with a full band and use live instrumentation in their recordings, paving the way for future hip-hop bands such as the Roots. The band combined beat-boxing, sampling technology, and live band performance, incorporating R&B, jazz, dancehall reggae, and rock into its sound. Stetsasonic is also considered one of the acts that pioneered jazz rap.

Though rumored to have disbanded in 1991, soon after the release of its third album, Blood, Sweat & No Tears, Stetsasonic continues to record and perform together, as evidenced by their subsequent release, "People In The Neighborhood", and their performance at the Urban Matterz Hip Hop Festival in 2019. Individual members branched out to explore solo careers, while still maintaining Stetsasonic. Frukwan and Prince Paul were founding members of the Gravediggaz, while the latter also became a record producer, as did Daddy-O.

== History ==
Originally, the band was known as The Stetsasonic 3 MC's. The original group consisted of Daddy-O, Delite, and Crown Supreme. Daddy-O and Delite changed the group's name and style to Stetsasonic the Hip-Hop Band. Additional members were Wise The Human Mix Machine, Prince Paul, the Devastating Beat Creator (DBC), drummer Bobby Simmons, and Frukwan, who replaced Crown Supreme. Stetsasonic clinched a deal with Tommy Boy Records when DBC created and played the funky bassline for its debut single “Just Say STET", live for Tom Silverman, owner of Tommy Boy. After a few months of the single being in regular rotation on radio stations, the band released its first album On Fire (1986). The album received mixed reviews, though the follow-ups, In Full Gear and Blood, Sweat & No Tears, were critically acclaimed.

A 1988 The New York Times article said that the band mirrored the rise of artistic, profound rap music: "While pop's political commentary often seems secondary to catchy melodies and commercial acceptability, rap's tough sound sharpens its commentary". As a "hip hop band", dependent on instruments as well as turntables, the band was also known for live shows, though sometimes the "rap-show format prevented Stetsasonic from employing the band instrumentation and studio layering that make their records so distinctive."

Frukwan and Prince Paul were founding members of the Gravediggaz, while the latter also became a record producer. Daddy-O went on to a solo career, while also working as a record producer, working with Freestyle Fellowship, Mary J. Blige, Positive K and the Red Hot Chili Peppers, among others. Prince Paul went on to produce the trio De La Soul. Drummer Bobby Simmons pursued work in public access, forming the show Flava Videos in the mid-1990s on Channel 26 (New York). In 2017, Simmons was a contestant on the FOX game show Beat Shazam where he was partnered with singer Shannon. MC Delite is currently the president and CEO of Flight Entertainment and a public speaker. DBC proceeded to produce tracks for Third World and the Cookie Crew, among others. In 1995, he became the owner and operator of Raw Beat Productions, a music & video recording studio, located in Philadelphia. In 2016, he invented the MN-1 Advanced Portable Power System, which is a sustainable energy source with a swappable battery compartment and solar-based charging system.

Wise also participated in a few commercials in which he lends his beatbox sounds. One was for Campbell's Soup in which a cartoon of a B-boy bear beatboxes. The commercial was broadcast amid Saturday morning cartoons. Wise was also featured in a documentary on the art of the human beatbox, Breath Control: the History of the Human Beat Box, which was shown at the Tribeca Film Festival and also featured fellow human percussionists such as Doug E. Fresh, Biz Markie, Ready Rock C, and Emanon.

Stetsasonic released the single "(Now Ya'll Givin' Up) Love" in 2020. They proposed an upcoming album called Here We Go Again.

== Discography ==
=== Studio albums ===
List of studio albums, with selected chart positions
Title	Album details	Peak chart positions	
Title	Album details	US R&B /HH	UK Dance
On Fire	Released: October 15, 1986; Label: Tommy Boy/Warner Bros.; Formats: CD, LP, cassette, digital download, streaming	32	—
In Full Gear	Released: June 21, 1988; Label: Tommy Boy/Warner Bros.; Format: CD, LP, cassette, digital download, streaming	20	34
Blood, Sweat & No Tears	Released: February 5, 1991; Label: Tommy Boy/Warner Bros.; Format: CD, LP, cassette, digital download, streaming	75	—
Here We Go Again	Released: April 5, 2024; Label: The SpitSLAM; Format: CD, LP, cassette, Digital download, streaming	-	—
"—" denotes a recording that did not chart or was not released in that territory.

=== EPs ===
List of extended plays
Title	Details
People in the Neighborhood 1991-1994 EP	Released: April 1, 2016; Label: Chopped Herring; Formats: LP
(Now Y'all Giving Up) Love	Released: July 31, 2021; Label: SpitSLAM; Formats: CD, digital download, streaming

=== Singles ===
==== As lead artist ====
List of singles with selected chart positions, showing year released and album name
Title	Year	Peak chart positions								Album
Title	Year	US Dance	US R&B	US Rap	AUS	NED	UK	UK Dance	UK Ind.	Album
"Just Say Stet"	1985	—	—	*	—	—	—	—	—	On Fire
"Faye/Forever My Beat"	1987	—	—	*	—	—	—	—	—	On Fire
"Go Stetsa I"	1987	—	—	*	—	—	—	—	—	On Fire
"A.F.R.I.C.A." (featuring The Rev. Jesse Jackson and Olatunji and the Drums Of Passion)	1987	—	—	*	—	—	—	—	—	Non-album single
"Sally/DBC Let the Music Play"	1988	—	25	*	—	—	100	—	—	In Full Gear
"Talkin' All That Jazz"	1988	22	34	*	87	—	73	—	—	In Full Gear
"Float On" (featuring Force M.D.s)	1989	—	56	24	—	91	91	—	—	In Full Gear
"A.F.R.I.C.A. (Norman Cook Remix)"	1990	—	—	—	—	—	81	—	—	Blood, Sweat & No Tears
"Speaking of a Girl Named Suzy/Anytime, Anyplace"	1990	—	—	—	—	—	—	—		Blood, Sweat & No Tears
"No B.S. Allowed"	1991	—	—	—	—	—	—	—	—	Blood, Sweat & No Tears
"So Let the Fun Begin/Hip Hop Band"	1991	—	—	—	—	—	—	—	—	Blood, Sweat & No Tears
"Talkin' All That Jazz (Dimitri from Paris Remix)"	1998	—	—	—	—	—	54	1	7	A Night at the Playboy Mansion
"The Hip Hop Band/Talkin All That Jazz"	1998	—	—	—	—	—	—	—	—	Blood, Sweat & No Tears and In Full Gear
"(Now Y'all Giving Up) Love"	2020	—	—	—	—	—	—	—	—	Non-album singles
"Here We Go Again"	2022	—	—	—	—	—	—	—	—	Non-album singles
"Fallen Soldiers"	2022	—	—	—	—	—	—	—	—	Non-album singles
"—" denotes a recording that did not chart or was not released in that territory. "*" indicates a chart that did not exist at the time.

=== As featured artist ===
List of singles as featured artist, with selected chart positions and certifications, showing year released and album name
Title	Year	Peak chart positions					Certifications	Album
Title	Year	US Dance	US R&B	US Rap	NZ	UK	Certifications	Album
"Self Destruction" (as part of Stop the Violence Movement)	1989	— (Note: "Self Destruction" did not enter the Dance Club Songs, but peaked at number 7 on the Dance/Electronic Singles Sales.)	30	1	33	75	RIAA: Gold	Non-album single

==== Guest appearances ====
List of non-single guest appearances, showing year released and album name
Title	Year	Album
"I Ain't Making It"	1989	Lean on Me Soundtrack
