= The Movement (Diggin' in the Crates Crew album) =

Compilation album by Diggin' in the Crates Crew
- Released: November 4, 2008
- Genre: Hip-hop
- Length: 40:38
- Label: D.I.T.C. Records; DITC 304
- Producer: Lord Finesse; Show; Drawzilla; E-Blaze; Ahmad; Buckwild

Diggin' in the Crates Crew chronology
Unreleased Production (2008)	The Movement (2008)

Professional ratings
Review scores
Source	Rating
HipHopDX	3.5/5 stars
RapReviews.com	6.5/10

The Movement is a compilation album from D.I.T.C. Records. It features all new songs, exclusive to this release only. Rather than a proper D.I.T.C. release focusing on the eight members of the original group, the compilation showcases the work of long-time affiliates such as The Ghetto Dwellas, Bo$$ Money and A-Bless alongside OC and AG of the main crew. Lord Finesse, Buckwild and Show all contribute beats to the project, however neither Diamond D nor Fat Joe had any involvement whatsoever. The Movement features one of the last tracks recorded by The Ghetto Dwellas member Party Arty, who died shortly after the release of the album due to health complications. Show acts as the project's executive producer and the album was self-released through D.I.T.C. Records.

== Track listing ==
#	Title	Producer(s)	Performer (s)
1	"Time Travel"	Finesse	O.C. & A.G.
2	"Mad Live"	Drawzilla	D-Flow
3	"Experience"	Show, E-Blaze	Show & A.G.
4	"Shine My Way"	Drawzilla	Party Arty
5	"When We Rollin"	Drawzilla	D-Flow
6	"Hard Hit"	Ahmed	O.C. & A.G., D-Flow, Boss Money
7	"Energy"	Show	O.C. & A.G.
8	"Bow"	Finesse	O.C.
9	"Boys is Doin' It"	Show	Boss Money
10	"Air Y'All"	Finesse	Joell Ortiz
11	"Insomnia"	Buckwild	O.C., D-Flow, A-Bless
12	"True Lies"	E-Blaze	O.C. & A.G.
