= Full Scale (EP) =

Studio album by Show & AG
- Released: May 24, 1998
- Recorded: 1997–98
- Studio: D&D Studios (New York, NY); Battery Studios (New York, NY)
- Genre: Hip-hop
- Label: D.I.T.C. Records
- Producer: Showbiz and A.G.; EP: Joseph Abajian (exec.); Rich King (exec.); LP: Amed "DJ Timbalan" Harris; DJ Greyboy

Showbiz and A.G. chronology
Goodfellas (1995)	Full Scale (1998)	D.I.T.C. (2000)

Showbiz and A.G. chronology
Soul Clap (1991)	Full Scale (1998)	Live Hard (2007)

Professional ratings
Review scores
Source	Rating
AllMusic	0/5 stars
RapReviews	6/10

Full Scale is an album by American hip-hop duo Showbiz and A.G., first released in early 1998 through D.I.T.C. Records as a nine-track extended play. Recording sessions for the EP took place at D&D Studios and at Battery Studios in New York with production was handled entirely by Show & AG. The EP, composed of five songs together with the instrumentals, featured guest appearances from Big Pun, KRS-One, O.C. and the Ghetto Dwellas. A CD version titled Full Scale LP appeared around 2002 included the 5 songs found on the EP together with ten additional tracks which had originally been released on various 12" singles and projects in the late 1990s. Beside artists involved in the EP version, the LP features guest verses from Big L, Diamond D and Lord Finesse, as well as production from DJ Greyboy and Amed Harris.

Song "Drop It Heavy" later appeared on A.G.'s 1999 solo album The Dirty Version and D.I.T.C.'s 2000 self-titled album. Song "Dignified Soldiers" from the LP was remixed and retitled as "Stand Strong" for D.I.T.C.. Songs "Time to Get This Money" and "Q & A" were also included as the fifteenth track on D.I.T.C.'s European and Japanese versions, respectively.

== Track listing ==
Full Scale EP
No.	Title	Producer(s)	Length
1.	"Full Scale" (featuring O.C.)	Showbiz & A.G.	3:50
2.	"Drop It Heavy" (featuring KRS-One and Big Pun)	Showbiz & A.G.	4:10
3.	"Spit"	Showbiz & A.G.	3:27
4.	"Q & A" (featuring the Ghetto Dwellas)	Showbiz & A.G.	4:00
5.	"Raw as Ever"	Showbiz & A.G.	2:21
6.	"Full Scale Beats"	Showbiz & A.G.	3:27
7.	"Drop It Heavy Beats"	Showbiz & A.G.	1:53
8.	"Spit Beats"	Showbiz & A.G.	1:50
9.	"Q & A Beats"	Showbiz & A.G.	1:55

Full Scale LP
No.	Title	Producer(s)	Length
1.	"Themes, Schemes & Dreams" (featuring O.C. and the Ghetto Dwellas)	Showbiz & A.G.	4:22
2.	"Drop It Heavy" (featuring KRS-One and Big Pun)	Showbiz & A.G.	4:10
3.	"Q & A" (featuring the Ghetto Dwellas)	Showbiz & A.G.	4:00
4.	"Full Scale" (featuring O.C.)	Showbiz & A.G.	3:51
5.	"Spit"	Showbiz & A.G.	3:27
6.	"Time to Get This Money" (featuring O.C. and Diamond D)	Amed "DJ Timbalan" Harris	2:52
7.	"Who's the Dirtiest?" (featuring the Ghetto Dwellas)	Showbiz & A.G.	3:30
8.	"Dignified Soldiers" (featuring Big L, Lord Finesse and O.C.)	Showbiz & A.G.	4:29
9.	"Put It in Your System" (featuring Diamond D)	Showbiz & A.G.; Lord Finesse (co.)	3:43
10.	"Raw as Ever"	Showbiz & A.G.	2:22
11.	"Dignified Soldiers Remix" (featuring Big L, Lord Finesse and O.C.)	Showbiz & A.G.	4:14
12.	"Spit Remix" (featuring D-Flow)	Showbiz & A.G.	3:11
13.	"Hidden Crates"	DJ Greyboy	3:28
14.	"Hold Mines"	DJ Greyboy	3:54
15.	"Get Dirty" (featuring the Ghetto Dwellas)	Showbiz & A.G.	3:53
Total length:			55:26
