= Showbiz & A.G. (album) =

EP by Showbiz & A.G.
- Released: March 17, 1992
- Recorded: 1991
- Studio: Jazzy Jay Recording Studios (The Bronx, NY)
- Genre: Hip-hop
- Length: 30:42
- Label: Showbiz; London; Payday
- Producer: Showbiz (also exec.); Diamond D

Showbiz & A.G. chronology
Showbiz & A.G. (1992)	Runaway Slave (1992)

Professional ratings
Review scores
Source	Rating
AllMusic	4/5 stars
RapReviews	7.5/10

Soul Clap (also labeled as Showbiz & A.G.) is the debut extended play by American underground hip-hop duo Showbiz and A.G. It was self-released in 1991 via their own independent record label Showbiz Records; and re-released on March 17, 1992 though London/Payday Records after signing a record deal. Production was handled by Showbiz and Diamond D. It features guest appearances from Lord Finesse and Diamond D on the posse cut "Diggin' in the Crates", which later became the name of hip-hop collective D.I.T.C. Songs "Party Groove", "Soul Clap" and "Catchin' Wreck" later was featured on the duo's debut LP Runaway Slave.

== Track listing ==
1992 release
No.	Title	Writer(s)	Producer(s)	Length
1.	"Intro"	Rodney Lemay; Andre Barnes	Showbiz	1:05
2.	"Party Groove" (Instrumental)	Lemay; Barnes	Showbiz	3:17
3.	"Soul Clap" (Short Version)	Lemay; Barnes; Joseph Kirkland	Showbiz; Diamond D	4:01
4.	"Catchin' Wreck"	Lemay; Barnes	Showbiz	4:15
5.	"Party Groove" (Bass Mix)	Lemay; Barnes	Showbiz	3:19
6.	"Diggin' In the Crates"	Lemay; Barnes; Kirkland; Robert Hall	Showbiz	6:01
7.	"Soul Clap" (Off Beat Mix)	Lemay; Barnes; Kirkland	Showbiz	4:18
8.	"Giant In the Mental"	Lemay; Barnes	Showbiz	4:26
Total length:				30:42

== Personnel ==
- Rodney "Showbiz" LeMay – main artist
- Andre "A.G." Barnes – main artist
- Joseph "Diamond D" Kirkland – producer (track 3), vocals (track 6)
- Robert "Lord Finesse" Hall – vocals (track 6)
- Christopher "DJ Premier" Martin – scratches (track 8)
- Chris Conway – engineering
- Gary Buchman – engineering
- John "Jazzy Jay" Bayas – engineering
- Tony Dawsey – mastering
- Alli Truch – art direction
