= Runaway Slave =

Studio album by Showbiz and A.G.
- Released: September 22, 1992
- Recorded: 1991–92
- Studio: Jazzy Jay (The Bronx, NY)
- Genre: Hip-hop
- Length: 1:09:34
- Label: Payday; London
- Producer: Showbiz; Diamond D

Showbiz and A.G. chronology
Runaway Slave (1992)	Goodfellas (1995)

Singles from Runaway Slave
- 1. "Party Groove" / "Soul Clap" Released: 1992; 2. "Fat Pockets" Released: 1992; 3. "Bounce ta This" Released: 1993

Professional ratings
Review scores
Source	Rating
AllMusic	4/5 stars

Runaway Slave is the debut studio album by American hip-hop duo Showbiz and A.G. It was released on September 22, 1992, via Payday/London Records. The album was produced by Showbiz and fellow D.I.T.C. crew member Diamond D. It features guest appearances from DeShawn, Diamond D, Dres, Lord Finesse, and Big L. It includes many interludes between songs that feature the Legion, Freddie Foxxx, Fat Joe, and Kid Capri.

The album was supported by Soul Clap EP, and spawned two singles: "Fat Pockets" and "Bounce ta This".

== Track listing ==
All music is composed by Showbiz, except tracks 8 and 14 co-produced by Diamond D.

No.	Title	Writer(s)	Length
1.	"Still Diggin'" (featuring Diamond D)	Rodney Lemay; Andre Barnes; Joseph Kirkland	3:42
2.	"Fat Pockets"	Lemay; Barnes	3:37
3.	"Bounce ta This" (featuring Dres)	Lemay; Barnes; Andres Titus	3:50
4.	"More Than One Way Out of the Ghetto"	Lemay; Barnes	4:28
5.	"Silence of the Lambs" (Remix)	Lemay; Barnes	4:49
6.	"40 Acres and My Props"	Lemay; Barnes	4:18
7.	"Runaway Slave"	Lemay; Barnes	4:50
8.	"Hard to Kill"	Lemay; Barnes; Kirkland	5:20
9.	"Hold Ya Head"	Lemay; Barnes	4:35
10.	"He Say, She Say"	Lemay; Barnes	4:18
11.	"Represent" (featuring Big L, DeShawn and Lord Finesse)	Lemay; Barnes; Robert Hall, Jr.; Lamont Coleman; DeShawn Barzey	5:53
12.	"Silence of the Lambs"	Lemay; Barnes	5:07
13.	"Party Groove" (Bass Mix)	Lemay; Barnes	3:19
14.	"Soul Clap" (Short Version)	Lemay; Barnes; Kirkland	4:01
15.	"Catchin' Wreck"	Lemay; Barnes	4:15
16.	"Party Groove" (Instrumental)	Lemay; Barnes	3:17
Total length:			1:09:34

== Vinyl release ==
No.	Title	Writer(s)	Length
1.	"Still Diggin'" (featuring Diamond D)	Rodney Lemay; Andre Barnes; Joseph Kirkland	3:42
2.	"Fat Pockets"	Lemay; Barnes	3:37
3.	"Bounce ta This" (featuring Dres)	Lemay; Barnes; Andres Titus	3:50
4.	"Runaway Slave"	Lemay; Barnes	4:50
5.	"Hard to Kill"	Lemay; Barnes; Kirkland	5:20
6.	"More Than One Way Out of the Ghetto"	Lemay; Barnes	4:28
7.	"Hold Ya Head"	Lemay; Barnes	4:35
8.	"Represent" (featuring Big L, DeShawn and Lord Finesse)	Lemay; Barnes; Robert Hall, Jr.; Lamont Coleman; DeShawn Barzey	5:53
9.	"Silence of the Lambs"	Lemay; Barnes	5:07
10.	"Soul Clap" (Short Version)	Lemay; Barnes; Kirkland	4:01
Total length:			46:00

== Personnel ==
- Andre "A.G." Barnes – vocals (tracks: 2–15)
- Rodney "Showbiz" Lemay – vocals (tracks: 1, 2, 5, 6, 9, 12, 13, 15), producer
- Joseph "Diamond D" Kirkland – vocals (track 1), co-producer (tracks: 8, 14)
- Andre "Dres" Titus – vocals (track 3)
- Robert "Lord Finesse" Hall Jr. – vocals (track 11)
- Lamont "Big L" Coleman – vocals (track 11)
- DeShawn "Sunkiss" Barzey – vocals (track 11)
- Other guests include Kid Capri, Fat Joe, the Legion and Freddie Foxxx

== Chart positions ==
Album

Chart (1992)	Peak position
Top R&B/Hip Hop Albums	78

Singles

Year	Song	Hot Rap Singles
1993	"Bounce ta This"	15
1993	"Fat Pockets"	8
