= Street Talk (D.I.T.C. album) =

Studio album by Show
- Released: October 4, 2005
- Genre: Hip hop
- Label: Lumberjack Records
- Producer: Show; Lord Finesse

Professional ratings
Review scores
Source	Rating
RapReviews.com	6.5/10

Street Talk is a 2005 album by hip hop producer Show, released with his crew D.I.T.C. The album is produced by Show and Lord Finesse, and features appearances from Big L, Big Pun, M.O.P., Fat Joe, O.C., A.G. and Party Arty and D-Flow of the Ghetto Dwellas.

== Track listing ==
#	Title	Producer(s)	Performer (s)
1	"A Whole Lotta"	Lord Finesse, Show	A-Bless
2	"On My Way"	Show	Fat Joe, Party Arty
3	"Chase Game"	Show	O.C., A.G.
4	"Where You At?"	Show	Big L, Big Pun
5	"Pounds Up (Remix)"	Show	M.O.P.
6	"Back in My Hood"	Show	Big L, Party Arty
7	"All Seasons"	Show, Lord Finesse	Party Arty
8	"A Lotta Love"	Show	Party Arty
9	"That's Bless"	Show	A-Bless
10	"Bronx Tales"	Show	Fat Joe
11	"A Look at My Life"	Show	Party Arty
12	"Done in Vain"	Lord Finesse	Milano
13	"Best Behavior"	Show	Big Pun, Fat Joe
14	"Show & Prove"	Show	Party Arty
15	"My Bad"	Show	Fat Joe, Party Arty
16	"Deal With a Feelin'"	Show	Milano
17	"You Ain't a Killer"	Show	A.G., Ruck, Party Arty, D-Flow
18	"Ridin' & Rollin'"	Lord Finesse	D-Flow, A-Bless
