= Buckwild: Diggin' in the Crates =

Diggin' in the Crates

Compilation album by Buckwild
- Released: March 27, 2007
- Recorded: 1993–1997
- Genre: Hip Hop
- Label: Ground Floor Recordings
- Producer: Buckwild

Buckwild: Diggin' in the Crates is a compilation of rare hip hop songs and remixes produced by Buckwild. It was released on March 27, 2007 through Ground Floor Recordings.

== Disc 1 ==
1. Channel Live feat. KRS-One - Mad Izm (Original Remix) scratches - O.Gee / DJ Ogee
2. Nas feat. AZ- Life's a Bitch (Remix #1) -
3. Artifacts feat. Busta Rhymes - C'Mon wit the Get Down (Remix)'
4. Lord Finesse - Hip 2 the Game (Remix)
5. Brand Nubian - Word Is Bond (Remix)
6. Beastie Boys feat. Q Tip - Get It Together (Remix)
7. Jemini the Gifted One - Scars and Pain
8. AK Skills - Nights of Fear
9. Big L - MVP (Remix #1)
10. Funkdoobiest - Rock On (Remix)
11. Ill Biskits - A Better Day
12. Grand Puba feat. Sadat X - I Like It (Remix)
13. Reservoir Doggs - Back to Berth
14. Kool Keith - Yo Black (Remix)
15. F.A.T.A.L. Fountain - All About Warz
16. O.C. - Burn Me Slow
17. Little Indian feat. The Foreigner - One Little Indian (Remix)
18. Chubb Rock - What a Year
19. Mike Zoot - Live & Stink

== Disc 2 ==
1. Organized Konfusion - 'Bring It On (Remix)'
2. Showbiz & A.G. - 'You Know Now (Remix)'
3. Bushwackas - 'Caught Up in the Game'
4. Guru feat. Bahamadia - 'Respect the Architect (Remix)'
5. Tha Alkaholiks - 'DAAAM! (Remix)'
6. Street Smartz - 'Problemz'
7. Brand Nubian - 'Rockin It'
8. Big L - 'MVP (Remix #2)'
9. Black Sheep - 'North South East West (Remix)'
10. Jemini the Gifted One - 'Story of My Life'
11. Diamond D feat. Lord Finesse, Sadat X - 'You Can't Front'
12. Nas feat. AZ - 'Life's a Bitch (Remix #2)'
13. Sadat X feat. Grand Puba, Lord Jamar - 'The Lump Lump (Nubian Mix)'
14. Special Ed - 'Lyrics (Remix)'
15. Channel Live - 'Mad Izm ('95 Remix)'
16. Lace Da Booms feat. Kwaze Modoe, Royal Flush - 'Cut That Weak Shit (Remix)'
17. O.C. - 'Love Child'
18. Rakim- 'Guess Who's Back (Remix)'
19. Reservoir Doggs - 'The Difference'
20. Mystidious Misfitss - 'I Be (Remix)'
