= Word...Life =

Studio album by O.C.
- Released: October 18, 1994
- Recorded: 1993–1994
- Genre: Hip-hop
- Length: 53:36
- Label: Wild Pitch Records
- Producers: Organized Konfusion; Buckwild; Lord Finesse; DJ Ogee

O.C. chronology
Word...Life (1994)	Jewelz (1997)

Singles from Word…Life
- 1. "Time's Up" Released: July 19, 1994; 2. "Born 2 Live" Released: November 22, 1994

Word...Life is the debut album from hip-hop artist O.C. It was released on October 18, 1994 by Wild Pitch Records. It also helped establish his membership in the legendary hip-hop crew D.I.T.C., which includes Lord Finesse, Showbiz and A.G., Diamond D, Fat Joe, Big L and Buckwild, who produced the majority of this album. Two singles from the album were released: "Time's Up" and "Born 2 Live".

== Critical reception ==
Professional ratings
Review scores
Source	Rating
AllMusic	4/5 stars
RapReviews	9.5/10
The Source	3.5/5 stars

AllMusic editor M.F. DiBella said that Word...Life signaled "the arrival of one of modern rap's more gifted storytelling lyricists", noting how O.C. delivers the "East Coast B-boyism" found in "Time's Up" but excels on "Born to Live" and the more "existential subject matter" on the record thanks to Organized Konfusion providing "thought-provoking intellectual diversity" throughout the record. In a retrospective review, Matt Jost of RapReviews praised O.C. for exercising his "creative control" on "straightforward, eloquent" tracks like "Ga Head" and "Let It Slide" and showcasing "a more intricate, abstract side" on songs like "No Main Topic" and "O-Zone", concluding that: "While not always believable as a battle rapper, in terms of the rap game O.C. really had said all that needed to be said in "Time's Up." But it was on the album where he had to live up to his own words. Which he did, with some success. He helped introduce a new breed of MC's that left behind the playfulness of the Native Tongues, the anger management of Public Enemy, the controversial 'attitude' of N.W.A, the pop sensibility of Heavy D."

== Track listing ==
#	Title	Songwriters	Producer(s)	Performer (s)	Length
1	"Creative Control"	O. Credle, L. Baskerville, T. Jamerson	Organized Konfusion	O.C.	1:44
2	"Word...Life"	O. Credle, A. Best	Buckwild	O.C.	4:53
3	"O-Zone"	O. Credle, A. Best	Buckwild	O.C.	4:04
4	"Born 2 Live"	O. Credle, A. Best	Buckwild	O.C.	4:46
5	"Time's Up"	O. Credle, A. Best	Buckwild	O.C.	3:29
6	"Point o Viewz"	O. Credle, D. Vanderpool, A. Best	Buckwild, Prestige	O.C.	4:14
7	"Constables"	O. Credle, L. Baskerville, T. Jamerson	Organized Konfusion	O.C.	4:04
8	"Ga Head"	O. Credle, R. Hall	Lord Finesse	O.C.	3:55
9	"No Main Topic"	O. Credle, G. Scott	DJ Ogee	O.C., Prince Po	3:42
10	"Let It Slide"	O. Credle, A. Best	Buckwild	O.C., Pharoahe Monch	4:23
11	"Ma Dukes"	O. Credle, A. Best	Buckwild	O.C.	3:58
12	"Story"	O. Credle, G. Scott	DJ Ogee	O.C.	3:03
13	"Outtro (Sabotage)"	O. Credle, A. Best	Buckwild	O.C.	2:51
14	"Born 2 Live (Remix)"	O. Credle, A. Best	Organized Konfusion	O.C.	3:45

== 2004 re-issue ==
Word...Life was re-issued in 2004, its tenth anniversary, with five bonus tracks. They are:

1. "Challenge Y'all"
2. "U Made Me"
3. "U-N-I"
4. "Half Good Half Sinner"
5. "Wordplay"

== Album singles ==
Single information
"Born 2 Live"
- Released: 1994
- B-Side: "Let It Slide"
"Time's Up"
- Released: 1994
- B-Side: "Time's Up (Buckwild Remix)", "Time's Up (DJ Eclipse Remix)"

== Chart positions ==
=== Album ===
Chart (1994)	Peak position
US Top R&B/Hip-Hop Albums (Billboard)	34

=== Singles ===
Year	Song	Hot Dance Music/Maxi-Singles Sales
1994	"Time's Up"	34
1994	"Born 2 Live"	41

== Sources ==
- discogs
