= Goodfellas (Show and A.G. album) =

Studio album by Showbiz and AG
- Released: May 30, 1995
- Recorded: 1994–95
- Studio: Chung King Studios (New York, NY); BlackHole Studios (Hampton, VA)
- Genre: East Coast hip-hop
- Length: 50:32
- Label: Payday; FFRR
- Producer: Showbiz; DJ Premier; Dres; Lord Finesse; Roc Raida

Showbiz and AG chronology
Runaway Slave (1992)	Goodfellas (1995)	Full Scale (1998)

Singles from Goodfellas
- 1. "Next Level" Released: May 16, 1995

Professional ratings
Review scores
Source	Rating
AllMusic	3/5 stars
RapReviews	9.5/10
The Source	3.5/5 stars

Goodfellas is the second studio album by American hip-hop duo Showbiz and A.G. It was released on May 30, 1995, via Payday/FFRR Records. Recording sessions took place at Chung King Studios in New York and at BlackHole Studios in Hampton. Production was handled by Showbiz, Lord Finesse, DJ Premier, Roc Raida and Dres. It features guest appearances from Wali World, the Ghetto Dwellas, Diamond D, Lord Finesse and Method Man. It spawned an underground hit "Next Level (Nyte Time Mix)", which later was included in 2002 film 8 Mile. The music video for Next Level was filmed primarily in the Brooklyn Bridge Park for shots under the Brooklyn Bridge and at the Manhattan Municipal Building. The exterior shots at the building were in front of the surface entrance to the Chambers Street subway station while the interior shots were filmed in lobby 31.

== Track listing ==
No.	Title	Writer(s)	Producer(s)	Length
1.	"Never Less Than III"	Andre Barnes; Rodney LeMay	Showbiz	1:32
2.	"You Know Now" (featuring Big Cathy)	Barnes; LeMay	Showbiz	3:48
3.	"Check It Out"	Barnes; LeMay	Showbiz	3:55
4.	"Add On" (featuring Lord Finesse and D-Flow)	Barnes; Damon Graham; Robert Hall, Jr.	Lord Finesse	4:01
5.	"Next Level (Nyte Time Mix)"	Barnes; LeMay	DJ Premier	4:10
6.	"Time For"	Barnes; LeMay	Roc Raida	2:47
7.	"Got the Flava" (featuring Method Man, Party Arty, Wali World and D-Flow)	Barnes; Graham; Arthur Sheridan; Wali Burgos; Clifford Smith	Showbiz; Dres	3:24
8.	"Neighbahood Sickness" (featuring Party Arty)	Barnes; Sheridan	Showbiz	4:38
9.	"All Out"	Barnes; LeMay	Showbiz	3:55
10.	"Medicine"	Barnes; LeMay	Showbiz	3:46
11.	"I'm Not the One"	Barnes; LeMay	Showbiz	2:49
12.	"Got Ya Back" (featuring Wali World)	Barnes; Burgos	Showbiz	3:50
13.	"Next Level"	Barnes; LeMay	Showbiz	4:01
14.	"You Want It" (featuring Diamond D and Party Arty)	Barnes; Joseph Kirkland	Showbiz	3:56
Total length:				50:32

== Personnel ==
- Andre "A.G." Barnes – vocals (tracks: 1–3, 7–14)
- Rodney "Showbiz" LeMay – producer (tracks: 1–3, 7–14)
- Big Cathy – additional vocals (track 2)
- Arthur "Party Arty" Sheridan – vocals (tracks: 3, 7, 8), additional vocals (track 14)
- Damon "D. Flow" Graham – vocals (tracks: 4, 7)
- Robert "Lord Finesse" Hall Jr. – vocals, producer (track 4)
- Christopher "DJ Premier" Martin – producer (track 5)
- Anthony "Roc Raida" Williams – producer (track 6), scratches (track 13)
- Andre "Dres" Titus – producer (track 7)
- Wali "Wally World" Burgos – vocals (tracks: 7, 12)
- Clifford "Method Man" Smith – vocals (track 7)
- DeShawn "Sunkiss" Barzey – additional vocals (track 10)
- Joseph "Diamond D" Kirkland – vocals (track 14)
- Chris Conway – engineering & mixing (tracks: 1, 2, 4–10, 12–14)
- Gordon Williams – engineering & mixing (tracks: 3, 11)
- Brian Miller – assistant engineering
- Jeff King – assistant engineering
- John Y. – assistant engineering
- Tony Dawsey – mastering
- Miguel Rivera – design

== Charts ==
Chart (1995)	Peak position
US Top R&B/Hip Hop Albums	23
US Top Heatseekers	10

Singles

Year	Title	Chart positions	
Year	Title	US Rap	US Dance Sales
1995	"Next Level"	27	9
