= The Awakening (Lord Finesse album) =

Studio album by Lord Finesse
- Released: February 20, 1996
- Recorded: 1995
- Studio: Chung King Studios (New York City); Soundtrack Studios (New York City); Giant Studios (New York City); Power Play Studios (Long Island City)
- Genre: East Coast hip-hop; hardcore hip-hop
- Length: 51:48
- Label: Penalty
- Producer: Lord Finesse

Lord Finesse chronology
Return of the Funky Man (1992)	The Awakening (1996)

Singles from The Awakening
- 1. "Hip 2 Da Game" Released: October 28, 1995; 2. "Gameplan" Released: January 9, 1996

Professional ratings
Review scores
Source	Rating
AllMusic	4/5 stars
The Source	3/5 stars

The Awakening is the third and final album by the hip-hop artist Lord Finesse, released in 1996. Unlike his first two albums, The Awakening features a large number of album guests, including O.C., KRS-One, Marquee, A.G., Diamond D, Large Professor and Brand Nubian's Sadat X and Grand Puba. Doo-Wop, MC Lyte, Akinyele, Showbiz and Kid Capri appear on interludes throughout the album. The album features the single "Hip 2 Da Game" and the hidden track "Actual Facts".

== Music videos ==
There have been music videos for the tracks "Hip 2 Da Game", "Actual Facts" & "Gameplan". "Gameplan" features a cameo from Big L.

Big L appears during the chorus for “Food for Thought”

== Track listing ==
No.	Title	Length
1.	"Da Sermon (Intro)"	2:16
2.	"Time ta Bounce" (featuring Doo-Wop)	1:22
3.	"True and Livin'"	4:42
4.	"O'Lord" (featuring O.C.)	1:22
5.	"Brainstorm/P.S.K. (No Gimmicks Remix)" (featuring KRS-One and O.C.)	4:46
6.	"Taking It Lyte" (featuring MC Lyte)	1:06
7.	"Gameplan"	5:10
8.	"Words from Da Ak" (featuring Akinyele)	1:34
9.	"Flip Da Style"	3:43
10.	"Showtime" (featuring Showbiz)	1:04
11.	"Speak Ya Peace" (featuring Marquee, Diamond, and A.G.)	4:55
12.	"Food for Thought"	4:05
13.	"Da Kid Himself" (featuring Kid Capri)	0:45
14.	"Hip 2 Da Game"	4:03
15.	"No Gimmicks" (featuring KRS-One)	5:46
16.	"Actual Facts" (featuring Grand Puba, Large Professor, Sadat X)	5:09
Total length:		51:48

- Note: "Actual Facts" is not listed anywhere on the jacket on CD or vinyl editions; the track was listed as a "bonus track" on a promotional sticker on the cover. The vinyl edition places the track after "Gameplan".

== Charts ==
Album

Chart (1996)	Peak position
US Top R&B/Hip-Hop Albums (Billboard)	36

Singles

Year	Song	Chart positions	
Year	Song	Hot Rap Singles	Hot Dance Music/Maxi-Singles Sales
1995	"Hip 2 Da Game"	36	42
1996	"Actual Facts"	37	32
