= Oasis (O.C. and A.G. album) =

Studio album by O.C. & A.G.
- Released: November 24, 2009
- Recorded: 2007–09
- Studio: Soul Estates (The Bronx, NY); Unique Studios (Norfolk, VA); In Ya Ear Studios (Long Island City, NY)
- Genre: Hip-hop
- Length: 58:02
- Label: Nature Sounds; NSD134
- Producer: Devin Horwitz (exec.); D.I.T.C. (exec.); Born Lords (E-Blaze and Showbiz); Davel "Bo" McKenzie; Lord Finesse; KC; Statik Selektah

O.C. chronology
Smoke and Mirrors (2005)	Oasis (2009)	Trophies (2012)

A.G. chronology
Get Dirty Radio (2006)	Oasis (2009)	Everything's Berri (2010)

Professional ratings
Review scores
Source	Rating
HipHopDX	4/5
RapReviews	8/10

Oasis is the collaborative studio album by American rappers and Diggin' in the Crates Crew members O.C. and A.G. It was released on November 24, 2009, through D.I.T.C. Records/Nature Sounds, after several pushbacks dating as far back as the spring of 2008. The album was first premiered in its entirety on the duo's Myspace page a week before the official release.

Recording sessions took place at Soul Estates in The Bronx, at Unique Studios in Norfolk, and In Ya Ear Studios in Long Island City. Production was handled by Born Lords (E-Blaze and Showbiz), Lord Finesse, Davel "Bo" McKenzie, KC and Statik Selektah, with D.I.T.C. and Devin Horwitz serving as executive producers. It features contributions from a female singer named Mirror Image, who sings the choruses on songs "Get Away" and "Pain", and DJ Premier's cuts on the song "Two For The Money".

== Track listing ==
No.	Title	Lyrics	Producer(s)	Length
1.	"Oasis"	Andre Barnes; Omar Credle	Statik Selektah	3:08
2.	"Keep It Going"	Barnes; Credle	E-Blaze	4:00
3.	"Give It Back"	Barnes; Credle	Lord Finesse; Davel "Bo" McKenzie	3:26
4.	"Alpha Males"	Barnes; Credle	Lord Finesse; Davel "Bo" McKenzie	3:42
5.	"Young With Style"	Barnes; Credle	Show; KC	3:19
6.	"Every Day Life"	Credle	E-Blaze	3:34
7.	"Think About It"	Barnes; Credle	E-Blaze	2:36
8.	"Against The Wall"	Barnes	E-Blaze	3:31
9.	"Put It In The Box"	Barnes; Credle	E-Blaze	3:34
10.	"Boom Bap"	Barnes; Credle	Show	3:06
11.	"Reality Is"	Barnes	E-Blaze	3:02
12.	"Contagious"	Credle	E-Blaze	3:21
13.	"Supreme Squad"	Barnes; Credle	Show	3:33
14.	"God's Gift"	Barnes	E-Blaze	3:36
15.	"Get Away" (featuring Mirror Image)	Barnes; Credle	Lord Finesse; Davel "Bo" McKenzie	5:00
16.	"Two For The Money"	Barnes; Credle	Show	2:17
17.	"Pain" (featuring Mirror Image)	Barnes; Credle	E-Blaze	3:10

Sample credits

- Track 1 contains a sample of "Phantom Lover", written by Jacqueline Hilliard and Leon Ware, as performed by Leon Ware
- Track 10 contains a sample of "It's Yours", written by Kevin Keaton and Rick Rubin, as performed by T La Rock & Jazzy Jay
- Track 16 contains a sample of "Industrial Power", as performed by Keith Mansfield

== Personnel ==
- Andre "A.G." Barnes – main artist, lyrics (tracks: 1–5, 7–11, 13–17)
- Omar "O.C." Credle – main artist, lyrics (tracks: 1–7, 9–10, 12–13, 15–17)
- Mirror Image – featured artist, vocals (tracks: 15, 17)
- Christopher "DJ Premier" Martin – scratches (track 16)
- Patrick "Statik Selektah" Baril – producer (track 1)
- Eric "E-Blaze" Blaze – producer (tracks: 2, 6–9, 11, 12, 14, 17)
- Davel "Bo" McKenzie – producer (tracks: 3, 4, 15)
- Robert "Lord Finesse" Hall – producer (tracks: 3, 4, 15)
- Rodney "Showbiz" LeMay – producer (tracks: 5, 10, 13, 16)
- KC – producer (track 5)
- Ramon Zuniga – engineering, mixing
- Sprague "Doogie" Williams – engineering, recording
- Vic Anesini – mastering
- Devin Horwitz – executive producer
- Azad Gonzalez – artwork
