= Return of the Funky Man =

Studio album by Lord Finesse
- Released: February 11, 1992
- Recorded: 1991
- Studios: Jazzy Jay Recording Studio (New York City, NY); 1212 Recording Studio (Jamaica, Queens)
- Genre: Hip-hop
- Length: 69:56
- Labels: Giant; Reprise; Warner Bros.
- Producers: Lord Finesse (also exec.); Showbiz; Diamond D; DJ Aladdin; Petawane; Slej Tha Ruffedge

Lord Finesse chronology
Funky Technician (1990)	Return of the Funky Man (1992)	The Awakening (1996)

Professional ratings
Review scores
Source	Rating
AllMusic	4/5 stars
The Source	3.5/5 stars

Return of the Funky Man is the second studio album by American hip-hop recording artist Lord Finesse of Diggin' in the Crates Crew. It was released on February 11, 1992 via Warner Bros. subsidiary label Giant Records. Production was handled by seven record producers, including Diamond D, Showbiz, DJ Aladdin, SLJ, Latif, Petawane, and Lord Finesse himself. It features guest appearances provided by A.G., Percee P, Harry-O and Shelrumble. The album peaked at number 95 on the US Billboard Top R&B/Hip-Hop Albums chart, and the title track reached number 13 on the Hot Rap Songs chart.

== Background ==
In 1991, Finesse split from his former partner DJ Mike Smooth and his former record label, Wild Pitch Records to release his first solo effort. Return of the Funky Man, which featured production from Finesse's partners Diamond D & Showbiz, and former Ice-T producers DJ Aladdin & SLJ. Finesse also produced his first beats on this album and would go on to become one of hip-hop's legendary producers. Finesse was signed to this Warner Bros. Records subsidiary because of Ice-T, who enjoyed a very positive relationship with the label, even through the controversy surrounding "Cop Killer", the notorious song by his heavy metal band Body Count. This album was the first cover shot by Danny Clinch.

== Track listing ==
No.	Title	Producer(s)	Length
1.	"Lord Finesse Intro"	Lord Finesse; Showbiz	2:01
2.	"Return of the Funky Man"	Showbiz	5:07
3.	"I Like My Girls With a Boom"	Lord Finesse	4:17
4.	"Yes You May" (featuring Showbiz & A.G. and Percee P)	Showbiz	4:57
5.	"Hey Look At Shorty"	Lord Finesse; Latif	3:18
6.	"Praise the Lord"	Diamond D	4:41
7.	"Save That Shit"	DJ Aladdin; SLEJ Da Ruff Edge	5:22
8.	"Show 'Em How We Do Things" (featuring Harry-O and Shelrumble)	DJ Aladdin; SLEJ Da Ruff Edge	5:37
9.	"Isn't He Something"	Diamond D	4:42
10.	"Fat for the 90's" (featuring A.G.)	Lord Finesse	4:27
11.	"Stop Sweating the Next Man"	DJ Aladdin; SLEJ Da Ruff Edge	4:23
12.	"Funky On the Fast Tip"	Lord Finesse; Petawane	2:32
13.	"That's How Smooth I Am"	Diamond D	5:19
14.	"Party Over Here"	Showbiz	4:21
15.	"Fuck 'Em"	Diamond D	5:09
16.	"Kicking Flavor with My Man" (featuring Percee P)	Lord Finesse; Petawane	4:22
Total length:			1:09:56

== Singles ==
Single information
"Return of the Funky Man"
- Released: August 1991
- B-side: "Fuck 'Em"
"Party Over Here"
- Released: May 16, 1992
- B-side: "Save That Shit", "Yes You May (Funk Flow Mix)" (featuring Big L)

== Charts ==
Chart (1992)	Peak position
US Top R&B/Hip-Hop Albums (Billboard)	95

=== Singles ===
Year	Song	Hot Rap Singles
1992	"Return of the Funky Man"	13
