= Jewelz =

Studio album by O.C.
- Released: August 19, 1997
- Recorded: 1996–1997
- Studio: Unique; D&D; New York City, New York
- Genre: Hip-hop
- Length: 61:18
- Label: PayDay; FFRR
- Producer: DJ Premier; DJ Ogee; Buckwild; Da Beatminerz; Showbiz; Lord Finesse

O.C. chronology
Word...Life (1994)	Jewelz (1997)	Bon Appetit (2001)

Jewelz is the second album by the rapper O.C. Unlike his debut, 1994's Word...Life, Jewelz features a wider number of guest producers and rappers. Producer DJ Premier (who also oversaw and mixed other parts of the album) lends his hand on four songs, while Buckwild and Da Beatminerz drop 3 songs each. O.Gee handles the production for two songs. D.I.T.C. members Showbiz and Lord Finesse each contribute one number and as the album was released the production was highly praised for its clean, crispy but at the same time dark and menacing sound.

O.C. plays with a wide array of styles on the album, from the war-metaphor battle song "War Games" to abstract stories on the haunting "The Crow" and a very special history on a mystique woman that enters Credle's life in "Stronjay". Though the differences between O.C.'s two first efforts are very noticeable many fans are constantly, and still, arguing which was the better album out of them.

This album, like his first, received strong reviews, but lacked in sales. He made his first appearance on the Billboard 200 album chart with the album, and also made his first appearance on the Billboard Hot 100 singles chart, with the single "Far from Yours". The album is now out of print.

As part of the concept for Jewelz, the CD was sold with different colored disc art inspired by the color palette of various jewels.

== Critical reception ==
Professional ratings
Review scores
Source	Rating
AllMusic	4/5 stars
The Source	3.5/5 stars
Sputnikmusic	3.5/5

Matt Conaway from AllMusic praised O.C. for maintaining his "street-based" musicianship by having top-notch New York producers and rappers contribute quality work throughout the record and delivering strong lyricism of his own, highlighting "My World" and "Dangerous" as examples. Vibe contributor Noah Callahan-Bever also gave praise to the album's production team for emitting an aura of "melodic contentment" for O.C.'s more naturalistic flow to deliver solid rhymes on "Dangerous" and the title track, despite "Far From Yours" being the only dud, concluding that: "Thankfully, O.C. is still concerned with the decline of rap music, only now he's stopped criticizing and has started to lead by example, unveiling one of his most finely polished Jewelz this year has seen."

== Track listing ==
#	Title	Songwriters	Producer(s)	Performer (s)
1	"Intro"			*Interlude*
2	"My World"	O. Credle, C. Martin	DJ Premier	O.C.
3	"War Games"	O. Credle, C. Martin	DJ Premier	O.C., Organized Konfusion
4	"Can't Go Wrong"	O. Credle, G. Scott	DJ Ogee	O.C.
5	"The Chosen One"	O. Credle, A. Best	Buckwild	O.C.
6	"Dangerous"	O. Credle, W. Dewgarde, L. Coleman, R. Lapread	Mr. Walt of Da Beatminerz	O.C., Big L
7	"Win the G"	O. Credle, C. Martin, J. Campbell	DJ Premier	O.C., Freddie Foxxx
8	"Far from Yours"	O. Credle, A. Best, M. Bryant, G. Johnson, L. Johnson, E. Barrier, W. Griffin	Buckwild; intro interlude by DJ Premier	O.C., Yvette Michele, Roc Raida
9	"Stronjay"	O. Credle, W. Dewgarde	Mr. Walt of Da Beatminerz	O.C.
10	"M.U.G."	O. Credle, C. Martin, J. Campbell	DJ Premier	O.C., Freddie Foxxx
11	"The Crow"	O. Credle, R. Lemay	Showbiz	O.C.
12	"You & Yours"	O. Credle, G. Scott	DJ Ogee	O.C.
13	"Hypocrite"	O. Credle, A. Best, W. Garfield, C. Clay	Buckwild	O.C.
14	"It's Only Right"	O. Credle, W. Dewgarde, C. Ward	Mr. Walt of Da Beatminerz	O.C.
15	"Jewelz"	O. Credle, R. Hall	Lord Finesse; intro interlude by DJ Premier	O.C.

Samples credits

- "My World" samples "Killer's Lullaby" by Barry White and "Theme d'Amour" by Ennio Morricone.
- "War Games" samples "It's My Thing" by Marva Whitney.
- "Can't Go Wrong" samples "American Tango" by Weather Report.
- "The Chosen One" samples "White Clouds" by Hiroshi Fukumura and Sadao Watanabe.
- "Dangerous" samples "Daisy Lady" by 7th Wonder.
- "Far From Yours" samples "Tomorrow" by The Brothers Johnson and "For the Listeners" by Eric B. & Rakim.
- "M.U.G." samples "The Saddest Thing of All" by Michel Legrand.
- "The Crow" samples "Zen-Gun" by Ryuichi Sakamoto.
- "You & Yours" samples "A Garden of Peace" by Lonnie Liston Smith.
- "Hypocrite" samples "Sensitize" by Roy Ayers.
- "It's Only Right" samples "Do You Like It" by B.T. Express.
- "Jewelz" samples "Changing Faces" by J.J. Band and "I'll Take Time" by John Kasandra.

== Album singles ==
Single information
"Far From Yours"
- Released: July 28, 1997
- B-Side: "My World"
"Can't Go Wrong"
- Released: December 16, 1997
- B-Side: "Dangerous"

== Personnel ==
Adapted credits from the liner notes of Jewelz.

- Patrick Moxey - executive producer
- Mr. Dave - executive producer
- Eddie Sancho - engineering
- Max Vargas - engineering
- Norty Cotto - engineering
- Tony Smalios - engineering
- Chris Conway - engineering
- Kieran Walsh - engineering
- Michael Gilbert - engineering
- DJ Premier - mixing
- Ogee - mixing
- Buckwild - mixing
- Da Beatminerz - mixing
- Showbiz - mixing
- Lord Finesse - mixing
- Tony Dawsey - mastering
- Danny Clinch - photography
- Gregory Burke - art direction, design

- Petawane & Miles Anthony -Backgrounds (Can't Go Wrong)

== Album chart positions ==
Chart (1997)	Peak position
US Billboard 200	90
US Top R&B/Hip-Hop Albums (Billboard)	16

== Singles chart positions ==
Year	Song	Chart positions			
Year	Song	Billboard Hot 100	Hot R&B/Hip-Hop Singles & Tracks	Hot Rap Singles	Hot Dance Music/Maxi-Singles Sales
1997	"Far From Yours"	81	43	12	23
1997	"My World"	–	–	–	15
1998	"Can't Go Wrong"	–	90	–	–
