= Nineteen Ninety Now =

Studio album by Celph Titled and Buckwild
- Released: October 26, 2010
- Recorded: 1994–1995 (Beats, production); 2008–2010 (Vocals, cuts, mix)
- Genre: Hip-hop
- Length: 72:07
- Label: No Sleep Recordings; Demigodz Records
- Producer: Buckwild

Celph Titled and Buckwild chronology
Nineteen Ninety Now (2010)	Nineteen Ninety More (2011)

Professional ratings
Review scores
Source	Rating
AboveGround Magazine	(19.50/20.00)
The A.V. Club	(favorable)
Exclaim!	(mixed)
HipHopDX	4.5/5 stars
HipHopSite.Com	4/5 stars
Music Emissions	4/5 stars
Rap Reviews	(7.5/10)

Nineteen Ninety Now is a collaborative album by Celph Titled and Buckwild. It was released on October 26, 2010. Notably, the beats used on the album were mostly created by Buckwild between 1994 and 1995, and lay unused for fifteen years, hence the LP's title.

== Reception ==
Nineteen Ninety Now received critical acclaim from music critics. Nathan Rabin of The A.V. Club described Nineteen Ninety Now as "one of the tightest, funniest, and most consistent hip-hop albums of the year." In December 2010, it was named the "Slept-On" album of the year by HipHopDX.

== Track listing ==
- All tracks produced by Buckwild

No.	Title	Writer(s)	Length
1.	"The Deal Maker"	A. Best, V. Mercer	4:36
2.	"Out to Lunch" (featuring Treach)	A. Best, V. Mercer, A. Criss	3:30
3.	"Eraserheads" (featuring Vinnie Paz)	A. Best, V. Mercer, V. Luviner	4:24
4.	"Fuckmaster Sex"	A. Best, V. Mercer	4:26
5.	"Swashbuckling" (featuring Apathy, Ryu, and Esoteric)	A. Best, V. Mercer, C. Bromley, R. Maginn, S. Ryan	4:47
6.	"I Could Write a Rhyme"	A. Best, V. Mercer	5:35
7.	"Hardcore Data"	A. Best, V. Mercer	5:10
8.	"Mad Ammo" (featuring F.T. and R.A. the Rugged Man)	A. Best, V. Mercer, F.T., R.A. Thorburn	5:13
9.	"Tingin'"	A. Best, V. Mercer	3:45
10.	"There Will Be Blood" (featuring Sadat X, Grand Puba, A.G., O.C., and Diamond D)	A. Best, V. Mercer, D. Murphy, M. Dixon, A. Barnes, O. Credle, J. Kirkland	4:12
11.	"Miss Those Days"	A. Best, V. Mercer	4:17
12.	"Step Correctly"	A. Best, V. Mercer	4:42
13.	"Wack Juice"	A. Best, V. Mercer	4:30
14.	"Styles Ain't Raw" (featuring Apathy and Chino XL)	A. Best, V. Mercer, C. Bromley, D. Barbosa	5:39
15.	"Where I Are"	A. Best, V. Mercer	3:55
16.	"Time Travels On" (featuring Majik Most and Dutchmassive)	A. Best, V. Mercer, Majik Most, D. Ziegler	3:26

== Charts ==
Chart (2010)	Peak position
US Heatseekers Albums (Billboard)	31
US Top R&B/Hip-Hop Albums (Billboard)	57
