= The Dirty Version =

Studio album by A.G.
- Released: September 21, 1999
- Genre: Hip-hop
- Length: 1:14:01
- Label: Silva Dom Records
- Producer: Naomi Silva (exec.); Rico S. (exec.); A.G. (also co-exec.); A.C.E.; Amed "DJ Timbalan" Harris; Buckwild; Diamond D; DJ Premier; Garth Mitchel; Gritty Traxx; Hehdkrack; Lord Finesse; Showbiz; Steve Bundy Wade; Wali World

A.G. chronology
Full Scale (1998)	The Dirty Version (1999)	Get Dirty Radio (2006)

Singles from The Dirty Version
- 1. "Rude Awakening" Released: 1999

Professional ratings
Review scores
Source	Rating
AllMusic	3/5 stars
XXL	M (2/5)

The Dirty Version is the first solo studio album by American rapper and producer A.G. of Diggin' in the Crates Crew. It was released on September 21, 1999, through Silva Dom Records with distribution via Landspeed Records. Production was handled by several record producers, including Buckwild, Diamond D, DJ Premier, Lord Finesse, Showbiz and A.G. It features guest appearances from Big Pun, Fat Joe, Guru, Kool Chuck, KRS-One, O.C., and the Ghetto Dwellas among others.

== Track listing ==
No.	Title	Writer(s)	Producer(s)	Length
1.	"Intro / Muddslide"	Andre Barnes; Arthur Sheridan; Damon Graham; Robert Hall	Lord Finesse	3:50
2.	"All Eye Seeing"	Barnes; Anthony Best	Buckwild	3:35
3.	"Diamond Burgos (Skit) / Rude Awakening"	Barnes; Sheridan; Graham; Steven Wade	Steve "Bundy" Wade	4:45
4.	"Mucho Susio (Skit) / Underground Life"	Barnes; Sheridan; Graham; Hall	Lord Finesse	4:51
5.	"Be With"	Barnes; Rodney Lemay	Show	3:03
6.	"Nowhere to Go"	Barnes; Joseph Kirkland; C. Dyson	Diamond D	4:11
7.	"A 2 da G"	Barnes; Wali Burgos	Wali World	3:05
8.	"Hold It Down (Skit) / Rock Star"	Barnes; G. Walker; Reality; C. Doe; Misery; Big Cle	Hehdkrack	4:36
9.	"Weed Scented"	Barnes; Omar Credle; Keith Elam; Christopher Martin	DJ Premier	3:30
10.	"Leave It Alone"	Barnes; Burgos; Sheridan; Amed Harris	Amed "DJ Timbalan" Harris	4:17
11.	"Club (Skit) / B.X.M.F."	Barnes; Kool Chuck; Teck 9; Garth Mitchel	Garth Mitchel	5:46
12.	"We Do That Too"	Barnes; Harris	Amed "DJ Timbalan" Harris	4:13
13.	"Do You"	Barnes; Sheridan; Graham; Burgos; A.C.E.	Wali World; A.C.E.	3:19
14.	"Asshole (Skit) / 20 Cent Girl"	Barnes; Devon Gray	Gritty Tracks	3:49
15.	"America Held Hostage (Skit) / Drop It Heavy"	Barnes; Lawrence Parker; Christopher Rios; Lemay	Show	4:19
16.	"Ishims"	Barnes; Sheridan; Graham; Stevie Wonder	A.G.	4:03
17.	"Kurupt Money"	Barnes; Murda Cap; Firehead; Best	Buckwild	5:11
18.	"Shout 'Em Out (Bonus Track)"	Barnes; Sheridan; Graham	A.G.	3:38
Total length:				1:14:01

Notes

- Track 1 features vocals from Party Arty and D Flow with additional vocals from Hehdkrack
- Tracks 2 and 12 feature additional vocals from Party Arty and D Flow
- Tracks 3, 13, 16 and 18 feature vocals from Party Arty and D Flow
- Track 4 features vocals from Party Arty, D Flow and Fat Joe
- Tracks 5 and 14 feature additional vocals from Hehdkrack and Mr. Mudd
- Track 6 features vocals from Kool Chuck and Diamond D with additional vocals from Blake Carrington
- Track 7 features additional vocals from Mr. Mudd
- Track 8 features vocals from Hehdkrack, Misery, Reality, Doe and Big Cle
- Track 9 features vocals from O.C. and Guru with additional vocals from Mr. Mudd
- Track 10 features vocals from Wali World
- Track 11 features vocals from Teck 9 and Kool Chuck with additional vocals from Mr. Mudd and D Flow
- Track 15 features vocals from KRS-One and Big Pun
- Track 17 features vocals from Murda Cap, Firehead and Party Arty

== Personnel ==
- Andre "A.G." Barnes – main artist, vocals, mixing (track 7), producer (tracks: 16, 18), co-executive producer
- Arthur "Party Arty" Sheridan – vocals (tracks: 1, 3, 4, 13, 16–18), additional vocals (tracks: 2, 12), creative coordinator
- Damon "D Flow" Graham – vocals (tracks: 1, 3, 4, 13, 16, 18), additional vocals (tracks: 2, 11, 12), creative coordinator
- Joseph "Fat Joe" Cartagena – vocals (track 4)
- Kool Chuck – vocals (tracks: 6, 11)
- Joseph "Diamond D" Kirkland – vocals & producer (track 6)
- Boo Ha Hehdkrack – vocals & producer (track 8), additional vocals (tracks: 1, 5, 14)
- Big Cle – vocals (track 8)
- Doe – vocals (track 8)
- Misery – vocals (track 8)
- Reality – vocals (track 8)
- Omar "O.C." Credle – vocals (track 9)
- Keith "GuRu" Elam – vocals (track 9)
- Wali Burgos – vocals (track 10), producer (tracks: 7, 13)
- Teck 9 – vocals (track 11)
- Lawrence "KRS-One" Parker – vocals (track 15)
- Christopher "Big Pun" Rios – vocals (track 15)
- Firehead – vocals (track 17)
- Murda Cap – vocals (track 17)
- Mr Mudd – additional vocals (tracks: 5, 7, 9, 11, 14)
- Blake Carrington – additional vocals (track 6)
- Robert "Lord Finesse" Hall – producer (tracks: 1, 4)
- Anthony "Buckwild" Best – producer (tracks: 2, 17)
- Steve Bundy Wade – mixing & producer (track 3)
- Rodney "Showbiz" LeMay – producer (tracks: 5, 15)
- Christopher "DJ Premier" Martin – producer (track 9)
- Amed Harris – producer (tracks: 10, 12), mixing (track 12)
- Garth Mitchel – producer (track 11), mixing (tracks: 11, 16)
- A.C.E. – producer (track 13)
- Devon "Gritty Traxx" Gray – producer (track 14)
- Alon "Pac Man" Cohen – mixing (track 1)
- E-Plugg – mixing (tracks: 2, 5, 8, 10, 12, 13, 17, 18)
- Ken Johnston – mixing (tracks: 3, 7)
- Eric Lynch – mixing (tracks: 4, 14)
- Al Boogie – mixing (track 6)
- Eddie Sancho – mixing (tracks: 9, 15)
- Chris Athens – mastering
- Naomi Silva – executive producer
- Kevin Henson – art direction, design
- Khalid Kenyatta Shabazz – A&R
- Aimee Morris – management
- Diana Blain – management
