= B-Ball's Best Kept Secret =

Compilation album by Various artists
- Released: November 15, 1994
- Recorded: 1994
- Genre: Hip hop
- Label: Epic
- Producers: Warren G, Ant Banks, QD III, Clark Kent, Diamond D, DJ Alamo, DJ Slip

Professional ratings
Review scores
Source	Rating
Allmusic	4/5 stars

B-Ball's Best Kept Secret is a compilation album released by Epic Records that featured NBA players performing songs with hip hop artists including Shaquille O'Neal.

== Track listing ==
1. "Hip Hop Basketball Genie"- :48
2. "Check It"- 4:07 (Dana Barros)
3. "Lost in the Sauce"- 4:57 (Malik Sealy)
4. "Mic Check 1-2"- 3:45 (Shaquille O'Neal and Ill Al Skratch)
5. "Earl the Goat"- :34
6. "Flow On"- 4:03 (Cedric Ceballos and Warren G)
7. "Anything Can Happen"- 5:03 (Brian Shaw)
8. "Sumptin' to Groove To"- 3:21 (Chris Mills)
9. "From the Bay to L.A."- 1:14 (Sway & King Tech)
10. "What the Kidd Didd"- 3:52 (Jason Kidd and Money-B)
11. "Funk in the Trunk"- 4:17 (J.R. Rider)
12. "Phat Swoosh"- :55
13. "All Night Party"- 3:47 (Dennis Scott)
14. "Livin' Legal and Large"- 3:54 (Gary Payton)
15. "D.J. S and S Represents"- 1:18
16. "Ya Don't Stop"- 4:42 (Dana Barros, Cedric Ceballos, Grand Puba, Sadat X, AG and Diamond D)
