= Forest Houses =

Public housing development in the Bronx, New York

- NYCHA property
- Interactive map of Forest Houses
- Coordinates: 40.825040°N 73.904660°W
- Country: United States
- State: New York
- City: New York City
- Borough: Bronx
- ZIP codes: 10456
- Area codes: 718, 347, 929, and 917

The Forest Houses are a housing project in Morrisania, Bronx. The project consists of fifteen buildings, 9, 10 and 14-stories tall with 1,350 apartment units. It covers a 17.72-acre expanse, and is bordered by East 163rd and East 166th Streets, and Trinity and Tinton Avenues. It is owned and managed by New York City Housing Authority (NYCHA).

== Development ==
Plans for the Forest Houses began in 1949 with securing funds from the federal government. NYCHA officials stated that the project was primarily a slum clearance program intended to provide better living conditions and a walkable community for the residents. During demolition of the slums, the area was likened to a "bomb blast scene" and held a defense test on the site. The development's design incorporated well-received modern features at the Carver Houses in East Harlem, including compact kitchens, electric ranges, and a refrigerator with freezer. NYCHA publicized that the tenants would be 58% Black and 42% non-Black, most of which were Puerto Rican. The Forest Houses were completed on November 12, 1956.

In 2013, Forest Houses residents worked with Swiss artist Thomas Hirschhorn to create the "Gramsci Monument", a space to encourage the exchange between people, ideas and communities in the form of a pavilion. Also that year, the NYCHA and Mayor Michael Bloomberg sold a portion of the development's property for the addition of a new privately owned building to offset the agency's capital needs. The eight-story LEED-certified building was designated for low-income households earning less than 60 percent of the area median income and cost approximately $37.7 million to build.

== Notable residents ==
- Diamond D (born 1968), hip-hop producer
- Fat Joe (born 1970), rapper and actor
- Coko (born 1970), R&B singer
- Lord Finesse (born 1970), rapper and producer
- Showbiz, hip-hop producer
- Phase 2, graffiti artist
- Glenn Ligon (born 1960), conceptual artist
- Lovebug Starski (1960–2018), pioneering hip-hop DJ and rapper
