= D.I.T.C. (album) =

Studio album by Diggin' in the Crates Crew
- Released: February 22, 2000
- Recorded: 1997–99
- Studios: D&D (New York, NY)
- Genre: East Coast hip-hop
- Length: 56:54
- Label: Tommy Boy
- Producers: Showbiz (also exec.); Amed "DJ Timbalan" Harris; Buckwild; Diamond D; DJ Premier; Lord Finesse; Rockwilder

Diggin' in the Crates Crew chronology
D.I.T.C. (2000)	The Official Version (2000)

Singles from D.I.T.C.
- 1. "Thick" Released: December 7, 1999

Professional ratings
Review scores
Source	Rating
AllMusic	4/5 stars
Robert Christgau	(dud)
NME	4/5 stars
RapReviews	9/10
The Source	3.5/5 stars

D.I.T.C. is the debut studio album by American New York-based hip-hop collective Diggin' in the Crates Crew. It was released on February 22, 2000, via Tommy Boy Records. It features contributions from all the eight members of the group: Lord Finesse, Showbiz and A.G., Diamond D, Fat Joe, O.C., Buckwild and the late Big L, as well as Big Pun, Milano, Cuban Link, KRS-One, and production from DJ Premier, Amed Harris and Rockwilder. The album peaked at number 141 on the Billboard 200, number 31 on the Top R&B/Hip-Hop Albums and number 9 on the Independent Albums in the United States.

The album produced three promotional singles: "Day One", which was released in 1997, "Get Yours" and "Way of Life", both released in 1999. Its lead single, "Thick", made it to number 37 on the US Hot Rap Songs chart. The album's closer, "Tribute", is a tribute track to member Lamont "Big L" Coleman, who was murdered on February 15, 1999.

== Track listing ==
D.I.T.C. (US version)
No.	Title	Writer(s)	Producer(s)	Length
1.	"Thick"	Andre Barnes; Lamont Coleman; Omar Credle; Christopher Martin	DJ Premier	3:42
2.	"Get Yours"	Coleman; Credle; Joseph Kirkland; Rodney Lemay; Louis Wilson; Ricardo Wilson; Carlos Wilson	Show	4:10
3.	"Where Ya At" (featuring Big Pun and Milano)	Christopher Rios; Rudy Morgan; Lemay; Keith Emerson; Greg Lake; Carl Palmer	Show	3:17
4.	"Way of Life"	Joseph Cartagena; Coleman; Lemay	Show	2:50
5.	"Day One"	Kirkland; Coleman; Robert Hall; Credle; Barnes	Diamond D	4:16
6.	"Hey Luv" (featuring Milano and Cuban Link)	Morgan; Felix Delgado; Hall	Lord Finesse	4:31
7.	"Foundation"	Kirkland; Credle; Barnes; Hall; Lemay	Diamond D	3:55
8.	"Champagne Thoughts"	Credle; Anthony Best; Morton Stevens	Buckwild	3:54
9.	"Ebonics" (Premo Mix)	Coleman; Martin	DJ Premier	3:00
10.	"Drop It Heavy" (featuring KRS-One and Big Pun)	Lawrence Parker; Rios; Barnes; Lemay	Show	3:59
11.	"Da Enemy"	Cartagena; Coleman; Martin	DJ Premier	2:46
12.	"Stand Strong"	Coleman; Hall; Barnes; Credle; Lemay	Show	4:26
13.	"Weekend Nights"	Barnes; Lemay	Show	3:13
14.	"Thick" (Rockwilder Mix)	Barnes; Coleman; Credle; Martin	Rockwilder	3:59
15.	"Tribute"	Credle; Barnes; Hall	Amed "DJ Timbalan" Harris	4:56
Total length:				56:54

D.I.T.C. (European version)
No.	Title	Writer(s)	Producer(s)	Length
1.	"Thick"	Andre Barnes; Lamont Coleman; Omar Credle; Christopher Martin	DJ Premier	3:42
2.	"Get Yours"	Coleman; Credle; Joseph Kirkland; Rodney Lemay; Louis Wilson; Ricardo Wilson; Carlos Wilson	Show	4:10
3.	"Champagne Thoughts"	Credle; Anthony Best; Morton Stevens	Buckwild	3:54
4.	"Way of Life"	Joseph Cartagena; Coleman; Lemay	Show	2:50
5.	"Day One"	Kirkland; Coleman; Robert Hall; Credle; Barnes	Diamond D	4:16
6.	"Hey Luv" (featuring Milano and Cuban Link)	Rudy Morgan; Felix Delgado; Hall	Lord Finesse	4:31
7.	"Foundation"	Kirkland; Credle; Barnes; Hall; Lemay	Show	3:55
8.	"Ebonics" (Premo Mix)	Coleman; Martin	DJ Premier	3:00
9.	"Drop It Heavy" (featuring KRS-One and Big Pun)	Lawrence Parker; Christopher Rios; Barnes; Lemay	Show	3:59
10.	"Da Enemy"	Cartagena; Coleman; Martin	DJ Premier	2:46
11.	"Stand Strong"	Coleman; Hall; Barnes; Credle; Lemay	Show	4:26
12.	"Weekend Nights"	Barnes; Lemay	Show	3:13
13.	"Thick" (Rockwilder Mix)	Barnes; Coleman; Credle; Martin	Rockwilder	3:59
14.	"Tribute"	Credle; Barnes; Hall	Amed "DJ Timbalan" Harris	4:56
15.	"Time to Get This Money"	Barnes; Kirkland; Credle; Amed Harris	Amed "DJ Timbalan" Harris	2:53

D.I.T.C. (Japanese version)
No.	Title	Writer(s)	Producer(s)	Length
15.	"Q & A" (featuring the Ghetto Dwellas)	Andre Barnes; Damon Graham; Arthur Sheridan; Rodney Lemay	Show	3:59

Sample credits

- "Get Yours" contains a sample of "Don't Mess With People", written by Louis Wilson, Ricardo Wilson and Carlos Wilson, performed by Mandrill
- "Where Ya At" contains elements from "The Endless Enigma", written by Keith Emerson, Greg Lake and Carl Palmer, performed by Emerson, Lake & Palmer
- "Way of Life" contains a sample of "Polarizer", written by Joseph Thomas, Lance Quinn and Brad Baker, performed by Joe Thomas
- "Champagne Thoughts" contains elements from "Police Woman Theme", written by Morton Stevens, performed by Johnny Gregory Orchestra

Notes

- "Drop It Heavy" has previously appeared on A.G.'s 1999 album The Dirty Version
- "Stand Strong" is an uncredited remix of D.I.T.C.'s 1998 song "Dignified Soldiers", written by Lamont Coleman, Robert Hall, Andre Barnes, Omar Credle and Rodney Lemay, performed by Big L, Lord Finesse, A.G. and O.C.
- Japanese version of the album has the same tracklist as its European version, except the 15th track, "Time to Get This Money", is replaced with "Q & A"
- "Da Enemy" was re-released as "The Enemy" on Big L's final album The Big Picture

== Charts ==
Chart (2000)	Peak position
US Billboard 200	141
US Top R&B/Hip-Hop Albums (Billboard)	31
US Independent Albums (Billboard)	9
