= Hatred, Passions and Infidelity =

Hatred, Passions, and Infidelity

Studio album by Diamond D
- Released: August 26, 1997
- Recorded: June 1996 - February 1997
- Studios: Studio With a View; Chung King; D&D Recording (New York)
- Genres: East Coast hip-hop; Hardcore hip-hop; Boom bap; Underground hip-hop
- Length: 56:48
- Labels: Mercury; PolyGram Records
- Producers: Diamond D (also exec.); Sha-Eaze; Kid Capri; Buckwild

Diamond D chronology
Stunts, Blunts & Hip Hop (1992)	Hatred, Passions, and Infidelity (1997)	Grown Man Talk (2003)

Professional ratings
Review scores
Source	Rating
AllMusic	3/5 stars
The Source	3.5/5 stars

Hatred, Passions and Infidelity is the second studio album from American hip-hop producer and emcee Diamond D. It was released in August 26, 1997 via Mercury and PolyGram Records. Originally scheduled for a March 4, 1997 release. Recording sessions took place at Chung King, D&D Recording and Studio With a View in New York City. Production was handled entirely by Diamond D, with additional production by Buckwild, Sha-Eaze and Kid Capri. It includes guest appearances from K. Terroribul, Gina Thompson, John Dough, Don Barron, Mark-Lo, Paradise, Phife Dawg, Pete Rock, Veronica, Sadat X, Busta Rhymes and his fellow D.I.T.C. members: Lord Finesse, Big L, Fat Joe and A.G..

It was released five years after his acclaimed debut, Stunts, Blunts & Hip Hop. The reason for the extended time between albums was due primarily to the legal battle between Diamond D and his then label PWL America Records. After the issues were resolved between him and the company, he was released from PWL America and recorded for the label's parent company Mercury Records. The album received positive reviews from music critics and fans.

In the period between his album releases, Diamond spent time producing a number of artists, including Brand Nubian, Cypress Hill, Fat Joe, The Fugees, House of Pain, KRS-One, Lord Finesse, Tha Alkaholiks, The Pharcyde, Illegal, and Xzibit. Hatred, Passions, and Infidelity features the single "The Hiatus" and the Kid Capri-produced D.I.T.C. crew cut "5 Fingas of Death."

== Track listing ==
#	Title	Producer(s)	Performer (s)
1	"Intro"	Diamond D	Kid Capri, Busta Rhymes
2	"Flowin'"	Diamond D	Diamond D, John Dough
3	"MC Iz My Ambition"	Diamond D	Diamond D, Don Barron
4	"No Wonduh (The Projects)"	Diamond D	Diamond D
5	"The Hiatus"	Diamond D	Diamond D
6	"J.D.'s Revenge"	Sha-Eaze	Diamond D, John Dough, Gina Thompson
7	"Painz & Strife"	Diamond D	Diamond D, Phife Dawg, Pete Rock
8	"Can't Keep My Grands to Myself"	Diamond D	Diamond D, Mark-Lo, Paradise
9	"5 Fingas of Death"	Kid Capri	Big L, Lord Finesse, A.G., Fat Joe, Diamond D
10	"This One"	Diamond D	Diamond D, Busta Rhymes
11	"Never"	Diamond D	Diamond D, Sadat X, K. Terroribul
12	"Cream N Sunshine"	Diamond D	Diamond D, Veronica
13	"Gather Round"	Diamond D	Diamond D
14	"K.T."	Diamond D	K. Terroribul
15	"On Stage"	Buckwild	Diamond D, K. Terroribul, John Dough
16	"Epilogue"	Diamond D	Diamond D

== Album singles ==
Single information
"The Hiatus"
- Released: 1997
- B-side: "No Wonduh (The Projects)"
"J.D.'s Revenge"
- Released: 1997
- B-side: "This One"

== Chart positions ==
=== Album ===
Chart (1997)	Peak position
Top R&B/Hip Hop Albums	40
Top Heatseekers	31

=== Singles ===
Year	Song	Hot Dance Music/Maxi-Singles Sales
1997	"The Hiatus"	11
