= Stunts, Blunts & Hip Hop =

Studio album by Diamond D
- Released: September 22, 1992
- Studio: Jazzy Jay's, Calliope Studios, New York City
- Genre: Hip-hop
- Length: 66:38
- Label: Chemistry; Mercury; PolyGram Records
- Producer: Diamond D; Showbiz; Lakim Shabazz; Jazzy Jay; the 45 King; Large Professor; Q-Tip

Diamond D chronology
Stunts, Blunts & Hip Hop (1992)	Hatred, Passions and Infidelity (1997)

Singles from Stunts, Blunts & Hip Hop
- 1. "Best-Kept Secret" Released: 1992; 2. "Sally Got a One-Track Mind" Released: 1992; 3. "What U Heard" Released: 1993

Professional ratings
Review scores
Source	Rating
AllMusic	4/5 stars
RapReviews	9/10
The Source	4/5 stars

Stunts, Blunts & Hip Hop is the debut album by the American hip-hop producer and rapper Diamond D, released on September 22, 1992. The album features some of the earliest appearances from Diamond's later D.I.T.C. partners Big L and Fat Joe da Gangsta, as well as his crew the Psychotic Neurotics. Diamond produced the majority of the album, with coproduction by Large Professor, Q-Tip, Jazzy Jay, Showbiz, and the 45 King. The album features three singles: "Best-Kept Secret", "Sally Got a One-Track Mind", and 'What U Heard". The album was not released on vinyl; however, there were promotional copies pressed with full artwork which were highly sought after. The vinyl edition was eventually made available as a reissue years later. The original promo version has a sticker on it; the reissue had this sticker scanned into the artwork.

In 1998, the album was selected as one of The Source's 100 Best Rap Albums.

== Track listing ==
#	Title	Producer(s)	Performer(s)
1	"Intro"	Diamond D	*Interlude*
2	"Best-Kept Secret"	Diamond D	Diamond D, Bonita, Fat Joe da Gangsta, LaReese & Whiz One
3	"Sally Got a One Track Mind"	Diamond D	Diamond D
4	"Step to Me"	Showbiz, Diamond D (co.)	Diamond D
5	"Shut the Fuck Up"	Diamond D, Showbiz (co.)	The Psychotic Neurotics
6	"Fuck What U Heard"	Diamond D, Lakim Shabazz (co.)	Diamond D
7	"I'm Outta Here"	Diamond D, Showbiz (co.)	Diamond D
8	"A Day in the Life"	Diamond D	Diamond D, Brand Nubian
9	"Last Car on the 2 Train"	Diamond D	The Psychotic Neurotics
10	"Red Light, Green Light"	Diamond D	Diamond D
11	"I Went for Mine"	Jazzy Jay, Diamond D (co.)	Diamond D
12	"Comments from Big L and Showbiz"	Diamond D	Big L, Showbiz
13	"Check One, Two"	Diamond D, The 45 King (co.)	Diamond D
14	"What You Seek"	Diamond D	Diamond D
15	"Lunchroom Chatter"	Diamond D	The Psychotic Neurotics
16	"Confused"	Diamond D	Diamond D, Michelle Sweeting, Jasmine
17	"Pass Dat Shit"	Diamond D	Diamond D, Whiz One, Maestro Fresh Wes, Mike G.Q., Fat Joe da Gangsta
18	"Freestyle (Yo, That's That Shit)"	Diamond D, Large Professor (co.)	Diamond D
19	"K.I.S.S. (Keep It Simple, Stupid)"	Diamond D, Q-Tip (co.)	Diamond D
20	"Stunts, Blunts & Hip Hop"	Diamond D	Diamond D
21	"Wuffman Stressed Out"	Diamond D	*Interlude*
22	"Feel the Vibe"	Diamond D, Showbiz (co.)	Diamond D, Showbiz
23	"A View from the Underground"	Diamond D	Fat Joe da Gangsta

Samples credits

- "Best Kept Secret" samples "I Can Hear You Calling" by Three Dog Night and "N.T" by Kool & the Gang.
- "Sally Got a One Track Mind" samples "It's a New Day" by Skull Snaps and "Sparkling in the Sand" by Tower of Power.
- "Step to Me" samples "Sam Enchanted Dick" and "Born to Be Blue" by Jack Bruce and "Fight Back" by Solomon Burke.
- "F*ck What U Heard" samples "Magnificent Sanctuary Band" by Donny Hathaway, "Alvina" by John Handy and "Show Business" by A Tribe Called Quest.
- "I'm Outta Here" samples "Gotta Get Away" by the Flaming Ember.
- "A Day in the Life" samples "Virginia's Pretty Funky" by Watsonian Institute.
- "I Went for Mine" samples "Faded Lady" by the S.S.O. Orchestra.
- "Check One, Two" samples "Stop" by Mike Bloomfield, Al Cooper and Stephen Stills and "Gets Into His Move" by Stezo.
- "What You Seek" samples "You Can Make It If You Try" by Sly & the Family Stone.
- "Confused" samples "Intimate Connection" by Kleeer.
- "Pass Dat Shit" samples "Keeping Me Out of the Storm" by Rare Earth and "Pride and Vanity" by Ohio Players.
- "Freestyle (Yo, That's That Shit!)" samples "Footin' It" by George Benson.
- "K.I.S.S (Keep It Simple, Stupid)" samples "American Tango" by Weather Report and "Hey Jude" by Clarence Wheeler and the Enforcers.
- "Stunts, Blunts & Hip Hop" samples "Almustafa the Beloved" by Billy Cobham.
- "Feel the Vibe" samples "Bad Tune" by Earth, Wind & Fire.

== Charts ==
Weekly charts

Chart (1992)	Peak position
US Top R&B/Hip-Hop Albums (Billboard)	47

Singles

Year	Song	Chart positions	
Year	Song	Hot R&B/Hip-Hop Singles & Tracks	Hot Rap Singles
1992	"Best-Kept Secret"	—	2
1993	"Sally Got a One-Track Mind"	84	12
