= Live Hard =

Live Hard may refer to:

- Live Hard (EP), by Showbiz and A.G., 2007
- Live Hard (film), 1989
