= Funky Technician =

Album by Lord Finesse

Studio album by Lord Finesse & DJ Mike Smooth
- Released: February 6, 1990
- Genre: Hip-hop
- Length: 52:33
- Labels: Wild Pitch; EMI 0777 7 98710 2 5 E2-98710
- Producers: DJ Premier; Diamond D; Showbiz; DJ Mike Smooth

Lord Finesse & DJ Mike Smooth chronology
Funky Technician (1990)	Return of the Funky Man (1992)

Funky Technician is the debut album by the American hip-hop artists Lord Finesse and DJ Mike Smooth, released in 1990 on Wild Pitch Records. It was produced by Smooth, DJ Premier, Diamond D, and Showbiz. In 2008, the album was re-released on Wild Pitch Records.

== Critical reception ==
Professional ratings
Review scores
Source	Rating
AllMusic	4.5/5 stars
RapReviews	9/10

AllMusic called the album "an excellent LP of battle rap with Lord Finesse simultaneously claiming and proving his immense skills over a set of funky backing tracks." In 1998, the album was selected as one of The Source's 100 Best Rap Albums. In 2003, Spin labeled Lord Finesse "an MC who packed more wit and flow and rhythm into a tossed-off couplet than most brought to a whole LP."

== Track listing ==
#	Title	Songwriters	Producer(s)	Performer (s)
1	"Lord Finesse's Theme Song Intro"	R. Hall, C. Martin	DJ Premier	Lord Finesse
2	"Baby, You Nasty [New Version]"	R. Hall, C. Martin	DJ Premier	Lord Finesse
3	"Funky Technician"	R. Hall, J. Kirkland	Diamond D	Lord Finesse
4	"Back to Back Rhyming"	R. Hall, R. Lemay, A. Barnes	Showbiz	Lord Finesse, A.G.
5	"Here I Come"	R. Hall, J. Kirkland	Diamond D	Lord Finesse
6	"Slave to My Soundwave"	R. Hall, M. Hughes, C. Martin	DJ Premier, DJ Mike Smooth(co.)	Lord Finesse
7	"I Keep the Crowd Listening"	R. Hall, J. Kirkland	Diamond D	Lord Finesse
8	"Bad Mutha"	R. Hall, J. Kirkland	Diamond D	Lord Finesse
9	"Keep It Flowing"	R. Hall, J. Kirkland, A. Barnes	Diamond D	Lord Finesse, A.G.
10	"Lesson to Be Taught"	R. Hall, C. Martin	DJ Premier	Lord Finesse
11	"Just a Little Something"	R. Hall, R. Lemay	Showbiz	Lord Finesse
12	"Strictly for the Ladies"	R. Hall, C. Martin	DJ Premier	Lord Finesse
13	"Track the Movement"	R. Hall, C. Martin	DJ Premier	Lord Finesse

== Charts ==
Chart (1990)	Peak position
US Top R&B/Hip-Hop Albums (Billboard)	93
