= Bon Appetit (album) =

Studio album by O.C.
- Released: April 24, 2002
- Recorded: 2000–2001
- Studio: In Ya Ear Studio (Queens, NY)
- Genre: East Coast hip-hop
- Length: 50:00
- Label: JCOR Entertainment
- Producer: Ahmed; Buckwild; Lord Finesse

O.C. chronology
| Jewelz (1997) | Bon Appetit (2002) | Starchild (2005) |

Professional ratings
Review scores
| Source | Rating |
|---|---|
| AllMusic | 2.5/5 stars |
| HipHopDX | 4/5 |
| NME | 2.5/5 stars |
| RapReviews | 6/10 |

Bon Appetit is the third solo studio album by American rapper O.C.. It was released on April 24, 2001, via JCOR Entertainment. Recording sessions took place at In Ya Ear Studios in Queens. Production was handled by Buckwild, Ahmed and Lord Finesse. It features guest appearances from A Bless, A.G., D Flow, Party Arty, TL and Uni. The album debuted at number 84 on the Billboard Top R&B/Hip-Hop Albums chart in the United States.

== Track listing ==
| No. | Title | Writer(s) | Producer(s) | Length |
|---|---|---|---|---|
| 1. | "Intro" | | | 1:16 |
| 2. | "Back to Cali" (featuring A-Bless) | Omar Credle; Anthony Best | Buckwild | 4:26 |
| 3. | "Soul to Keep" | Credle; Best | Buckwild | 3:46 |
| 4. | "Dr. Know" | Credle; Robert Hall | Lord Finesse | 4:05 |
| 5. | "Bounce Mission" | Credle; Amed Harris | Ahmed | 4:11 |
| 6. | "Bon Appetit" (featuring Uni and T.L.) | Credle; Best; C. Brown; R. Wilson | Buckwild | 4:02 |
| 7. | "Doin' Dirt" | Credle; Harris | Ahmed | 3:01 |
| 8. | "Get It Dirty" (featuring Party Arty and D Flow) | Credle; Best | Buckwild | 3:53 |
| 9. | "Utmost" | Credle; Best | Buckwild | 3:44 |
| 10. | "Respect Tha Drop" | Credle; Best | Buckwild | 2:18 |
| 11. | "Weed & Drinks" (featuring A.G.) | Credle; Andre Barnes; Best | Buckwild | 3:04 |
| 12. | "Paradise" | Credle; Best | Buckwild | 3:49 |
| 13. | "Psalm 23" | Credle; Best | Buckwild | 8:25 |
| Total length: | | | | 50:00 |

Notes

- Track 13 contains a hidden track "Bonafide" (alternately written as "Bona Fide") featuring Jay-Z.

== Personnel ==
- Omar "O.C." Credle – vocals
- Andrew "A. Bless" Delvalle – featured artist (track 2)
- Shawn "Uni" Willis – featured artist (track 6)
- T.L. – featured artist (track 6)
- Arthur "Party Arty" Sheridan – featured artist (track 8)
- Damon "D-Flow" Graham – featured artist (track 8)
- Andre "A.G." Barnes – featured artist (track 11)
- Shawn "Jay-Z" Carter – featured artist (track 13)
- Anthony "Buckwild" Best – producer (tracks: 2, 3, 6, 8–13)
- Robert "Lord Finesse" Hall Jr. – producer (track 4)
- Ahmed Harris – producer (tracks: 5, 7)
- Rock Logic – mixing
- Dave Sumpter – executive producer, A&R
- Phat Gary – executive producer
- Estevan "Scandalous" Oriol – design, photography
- Mark "Mr. Cartoon" Machado – design
- Sonny Gerasimowicz – design

== Charts ==
| Chart (2001) | Peak position |
|---|---|
| US Top R&B/Hip-Hop Albums (Billboard) | 84 |
