= Buckwild (music producer) =

American hip-hop producer

- Born: Anthony Best; March 20, 1968 (age 58); The Bronx, New York City, U.S.
- Genre: Hip-hop
- Occupations: Producer; DJ
- Years active: 1993–present
- Labels: Kurrup Money Entertainment; Still Diggin' Productions

Anthony Best (born March 20, 1968) known professionally as Buckwild, is an American hip-hop producer. Hailing from The Bronx borough of New York City, he is a member of Diggin' in the Crates Crew, along with Lord Finesse, Showbiz and A.G., Diamond D, Fat Joe, Big L, and O.C. He has produced numerous tracks for prominent rappers in the music industry, including The Notorious B.I.G.'s "I Got a Story to Tell" and Black Rob's "Whoa!". In 2013, he was described by HipHopDX as "one of Hip Hop's most prolific and acclaimed producers".

== Career ==
In 2010, Buckwild released Nineteen Ninety Now, a collaborative album with Celph Titled. In 2014, he released a collaborative album with Meyhem Lauren, titled Silk Pyramids.

== Discography ==
=== Studio albums ===
- Nineteen Ninety Now (2010) (with Celph Titled)
- Silk Pyramids (2014) (with Meyhem Lauren)
- Trafficanté (2019) (with Pounds)
- No Expiration Date (2022) (with Artifacts)
- Paint the World Black (2025) (with Saigon)

=== Compilation albums ===
- Buckwild: Diggin' in the Crates (2007)
- Nineteen Ninety More (2011) (with Celph Titled)
- Music Is My Religion (2020)

=== EPs ===
- Still Diggin' Composition EP (1998)
- Buckwild Presents... (2010)
- Silk Pyramids Extras EP (2014) (with Meyhem Lauren)
- Fully Loaded (2020)

=== Productions ===
==== 1994 ====
- O.C. - "Word...Life"; "O-Zone"; "Born 2 Live"; "Time's Up"; "Point O' Viewz" (co-produced by Prestige), "Let It Slide"; "Ma Dukes" and "Outtro (Sabotage)" from Word...Life; "Time's Up (Remix)" from the 12"
- Ultramagnetic MCs - "Yo Black! (Remix)" from the 12"
- Black Sheep - "North South East West (Remix)" from the 12"
- Beastie Boys - "Get It Together (BuckWild Remix)" from the 12"
- Ahmad - "You Gotta Be... (Remix)" from the 12"
- Artifacts - "C'mon Wit da Git Down"; "Attack of New Jeruzalum"; "What Goes On" and "C'mon Wit da Git Down (Remix)" from Between a Rock and a Hard Place
- Brand Nubian - "Alladat" from Everything Is Everything
- Organized Konfusion - "Stress"; "Thirteen" and "Why" (co-produced by O.K.) from Stress: The Extinction Agenda
- Scientifik - "Overnite Gangsta"; "Downlo Ho" and "Fallen Star" from Criminal

==== 1995 ====
- Channel Live - "Mad Izm (Remix)" and ('95 Remix) from the 12"
- Mystidious Misfits - "I Be (Remix) from the 12"
- Alkaholics - "Daaamn! (Remix)" from the 12"
- Funkdoobiest - "Rock On (Remix)" from the 12"
- Grand Puba - "I Like It (I Wanna Be Where You Are) [Remix]" from the 12"
- Guru - "Respect the Architect (Remix)" from the 12"
- Bushwackas - "Caught up in the Game" from the 12"
- Little Indian - "One Little Indian (Remix)" from One Little Indian VLS
- Showbiz & A.G. - "U Know Now (Remix)" from the 12"
- Special Ed - "Lyrics (Remix)" from the 12"
- Lord Finesse - "Hip 2 da Game (Remix)" from the 12"
- Big L - "Put It On"; "8 Iz Enuff"; "Danger Zone" and "Da Graveyard" from Lifestylez ov da Poor & Dangerous; "MVP (Remix)" from the 12"
- Main One - "Learn 2 Be a Man 4 Self"; "Nigguz Ain't Got It" from Birth of the Ghetto Child
- Red Hot Lover Tone - "In the Game"; "98"; "4 My Peeps (Buckwild Version)" from #1 Player
- Jemini the Gifted One - "Scars & Pain"; "Story of My Life" from Scars & Pain
- Ill Biskits - "A Better Day" from Chronicle of 2 Losers
- Kool G Rap - "Blowin' Up in the World" and "Fast Life" from 4,5,6
- AZ - "Ho Happy Jackie" from Doe or Die
- Mic Geronimo - "Masta I.C."; "Three Stories High" and "Train of Thought" from The Natural

==== 1996 ====
- AK Skillz - "Nights of Fear" from the 12"
- Chubb Rock - "What a Year" from the 12"
- Gabrielle - "Give Me a Little More (Remix)" from the 12"
- Reservoir Doggs - "The Difference"; "Back 2 Berth" from 12"
- Street Smartz - "Problemz" from the 12"
- A+ - "Me & My Microphone" from The Latch-Key Child
- Mad Skillz - "VA in the House"; "Doin' Time in the Cypha" and "Get Your Groove On" from From Where???
- Organized Konfusion - "Bring It On (Remix)" from The Substitute (soundtrack)
- Sadat X - "The Lump Lump"; "Smoking on the Low" from Wild Cowboys
- O.C. and Buckwild - "What I Represent" from America Is Dying Slowly

==== 1997 ====
- Rhymester - "マイクの刺客" from Zebra 12"
- Mike Zoot - "Live + Stink" from the 12"
- F.A.T.A.L. Fountain - "All About Wars" from the 12"
- Shamus - "Tight Team" from the 12"
- AK Skills - "One Thing or Another" from the 12"
- Rakim - "Guess Who's Back (Remix)" from the 12"
- Afro Jazz - "Représente"; "La Téci"; "You Can't Stop" from Afrocalypse
- The Notorious B.I.G. - "I Got a Story to Tell" from Life After Death
- Capone-N-Noreaga - "Neva Die Alone"; "Black Gangstas" from The War Report
- Royal Flush - "I Been Gettin' So Much $"; "Niggas Night Out"; "Makin' Moves" from Ghetto Millionaire
- O.C. - "The Chosen One"; "Far from Yours"; "Hypocrite" from Jewelz
- Diamond D - "On Stage" from Hatred, Passions and Infidelity
- Street Smartz - "Don't Trust Anyone" from Tru Criminal Records EP
- Organized Konfusion - "Shugah Shorty"; "Invetro" from The Equinox
- Mic Geronimo - "How You Been?" from Vendetta
- Jay-Z - "Lucky Me" from In My Lifetime, Vol. 1

==== 1998 ====
- Rugged Brood - "What's the Impact" from the 12"
- Brand Nubian - "Brand Nubian"; "Maybe One Day" from Foundation
- Rough House Survivors - "My Peoples" from Survival of the Fittest
- Fat Joe - "Walk on By" from Don Cartagena
- DJ Clue - "Cops & Robbers" from The Professional

==== 1999 ====
- First Platoon - "Watch Ya Back": "Capital Punishment" from 12"
- Akinyele - "Sister, Sister" from Aktapuss
- A.G. - "All Eye Seeing"; "Kurupt Money" from The Dirty Version
- Brixx - "Poor Without Love" from Everything Happens for a Reason
- Memphis Bleek - "What You Think of That" from Coming of Age
- Mase - "Another Story to Tell" from Double Up
- Terror Squad - "Rudeboy Salute" from The Album
- Black Rob - "Whoa!" from Life Story

==== 2000 ====
- Black Ice - "Nights in the Summertime" from 12"
- Big Pun - "Nigga Shit" from Yeeeah Baby
- Beanie Sigel - "What a Thug About" from The Truth
- D.I.T.C. - "Champagne Thoughts" from D.I.T.C.

==== 2001 ====
- Cuban Link, N.O.R.E., Lord Tariq, Kool G Rap & M.O.P. - "Men of Business" from 24K {unreleased}
- Big Pun - "The Dream Shatterer (Original Version)" from Endangered Species
- O.C. - "Back to Cali", "Soul to Keep", "Bon Appetit", "Get It Dirty", "Utmost", "Respect da Drop", "Weed & Drinks", "Paradise", "Psalm 23" and "Bonafide" from Bon Appetit
- Faith Evans - "I Love You" from Faithfully
- Babyface - "Outside In/Inside Out" (co-produced by Mike City); "Lover and Friend" (co-produced by Babyface) from Face2Face
- P. Diddy & The Bad Boy Family - "So Complete" from The Saga Continues...
- Fat Joe - "My Lifestyle"; "Still Real" from Jealous Ones Still Envy (J.O.S.E.)

==== 2002 ====
- AZ - " I'm Back", "Rebirth" from Aziatic
- Angie Martinez - "Animal House" from Animal House
- WC - "So Hard" from Ghetto Heisman
- F.T. & M.A.F.I.A. - "Money All the Time" from All About the Benjamins (soundtrack)
- Styles P - "Daddy Get That Cash" (co-produced by DJ Twinz) from A Gangster and a Gentleman
- Cormega - "A Thin Line" from The True Meaning
- Fat Joe - "Take a Look at My Life" from Loyalty
- Kool G Rap - "Holla Back" and "The Streets" from The Giancana Story

==== 2003 ====
- 702 - "Better Day (Ghetto Girl)" from Star
- DJ Kay Slay - "Take a Look at My Life (Remix)" [Fat Joe, Remy Ma, A-Bless] from The Streetsweeper, Vol. 1
- Da Ranjahz - "3rd Person" from Who Feels It Knows
- Lumidee - "Only for Your Good" from Almost Famous
- Loon - "I'll Be There" from Loon
- Aile - "No More Game" from Personalty

==== 2004 ====
- Nas - "These Are Our Heroes" from Street's Disciple
- Shyne - "Quasi O.G." from Godfather Buried Alive
- Terror Squad - "Pass Away" from True Story

==== 2005 ====
- The Game - "Like Father, Like Son" from The Documentary
- 50 Cent - "I Don't Need 'Em" from The Massacre
- Black Rob - "When You Get Home" from The Black Rob Report
- Beanie Sigel - "Look at Me Now" from The B. Coming
- I-20 & Playaz Circle - "You Ain't Got Enough" from Disturbing tha Peace
- Sheek Louch - "Intro" from After Taxes
- AZ - "Live Wire" from A.W.O.L.

==== 2006 ====
- Remy Ma - "She's Gone" from There's Something About Remy: Based on a True Story
- Lake & Cormega - "Snitch Nigga", "Get It" from My Brother's Keeper

==== 2007 ====
- Playaz Circle - "U Can Believe It" from Supply & Demand

==== 2008 ====
- Termanology - "Respect My Walk" from Politics as Usual
- Immortal Technique - "Stronghold Grip" from The 3rd World

==== 2009 ====
- Jadakiss - "Pain & Torture" from The Last Kiss
- Method Man & Redman - "Mrs. International" from Blackout! 2
- Cormega - "Mega Fresh X" from Born and Raised

==== 2010 ====
- Sadat X - "Long Years" from Wild Cowboys II
- Styles P - "Time Will Tell" from The Green Ghost Project
- Capone-N-Noreaga - "With Me" from The War Report 2: Report the War

==== 2011 ====
- Black Rob - "Welcome Back" and "Made Me a Man" from Game Tested, Streets Approved
- Saigon - "Oh Yeah (Our Babies)" from The Greatest Story Never Told

==== 2012 ====
- Nas - "You Wouldn't Understand" from Life Is Good
- Maino - "Nino Brown" from The Day After Tomorrow

==== 2013 ====
- R.A. the Rugged Man - "Still Diggin Wit Buck (Legends Intro)" and "Media Midgets" from Legends Never Die
- Papoose - "Cure" from The Nacirema Dream
- Raekwon - "Hold You Down" from Lost Jewlry
- Chris Rivers - "That Ratchet Shit" from Wonderland of Misery

==== 2014 ====
- Remy Ma - WSBH from I'm Around

==== 2015 ====
- DJ EFN - "Revolutionary Ride Music" from Another Time
- Ea$y Money - "Money & Blood" from The Motive of Nearly Everybody, Yo

==== 2016 ====
- Reks - "Jump Shots" from The Greatest X
- Vinnie Paz - "The Void" from The Cornerstone of the Corner Store
- Termanology - "I Dream B.I.G." from More Politics

==== 2018 ====
- Apathy - "A View of Hell (Hell of a View)" from The Widow's Son

==== 2020 ====
- Jadakiss - "Gov't Cheese" from Ignatius

==== 2021 ====
- AZ - "Blow That Shit" from Doe or Die II

==== 2023 ====
- AZ - All 11 songs from Truth Be Told

==== 2026 ====
- AZ & Amar Noir - "Winners Win" from Doe or Die III
