= Live Hard (EP) =

EP by The Show & A Experience
- Released: September 24, 2007
- Recorded: 2007
- Studio: Headqcourterz Studios (New York, NY)
- Genre: Hip-hop
- Length: 34:35
- Label: D.I.T.C. Records
- Producer: A.G. (exec.); Showbiz (also exec.); E-Blaze

Showbiz and A.G. chronology
Full Scale (1998)	Live Hard (2007)

Professional ratings
Review scores
Source	Rating
AllMusic	0/5 stars
HipHopDX	3/5

Live Hard is the third extended play by American hip-hop duo Showbiz and A.G. It was released in late 2007 through D.I.T.C. Records. Recording sessions took place at Headqcourterz Studios in New York. Production was handled by Born Lords (Showbiz and E-Blaze). It features contributions from O.C. and DJ Premier.

Released under the name The Show & A Experience, the EP is the first material the duo has recorded together since 1998's Full Scale and is supposed to be a prelude to an upcoming full-length album. The album was re-released in 2008 on CD and limited 2xLP featuring a remixed version of "Land Of The Free" featuring the same lyrics but with a new beat from Show.

== Track listing ==
No.	Title	Writer(s)	Producer(s)	Length
1.	"Business as Usual"	Andre Barnes; Rodney Lemay	Show	2:58
2.	"Can't Relate"	Barnes; Lemay	Show	2:34
3.	"The World Is Listening"	Barnes; Lemay	Show	3:25
4.	"Running Man"	Barnes; Lemay	Show	3:04
5.	"Land of the Free" (featuring O.C.)	Barnes; Omar Credle; Lemay	Show	2:49
6.	"Live Hard"	Barnes; Lemay	Show	2:45
7.	"Magic"	Barnes; Eric Blaze	E-Blaze	2:29
8.	"Business as Usual" (Instrumental)		Show	3:00
9.	"Can't Relate" (Instrumental)		Show	2:33
10.	"The World Is Listening" (Instrumental)		Show	3:25
11.	"Land of the Free" (Instrumental)		Show	2:49
12.	"Live Hard" (Instrumental)		Show	2:44
Total length:				34:35
