= Grown Man Talk =

Mixtape by Diamond D
- Released: March 1, 2003
- Recorded: 2002–2003
- Genre: Hip-hop
- Label: Diamond Mine Records
- Producer: Diamond D 88-Keys

Diamond D chronology
Hatred, Passions and Infidelity (1997)	Grown Man Talk (2003)	The Diamond Mine (2005)

Professional ratings
Review scores
Source	Rating
RapReviews.com	link

Grown Man Talk is a 2003 mixtape from hip-hop artist Diamond D, released through Diamond's own Diamond Mine imprint. The album was not distributed nationwide, and only a limited number of copies were printed. Grown Man Talk featured production from Diamond and 88-Keys, as well as appearances from Brand Nubian's Sadat X.

== Track listing ==
- All tracks produced by Diamond D, except track 10 produced by 88-Keys

#	Title	Performer (s)
1	"Intro"	Diamond D
2	"Time Will Heal U"	Diamond D
3	"Da Magnificent"	Diamond D
4	"Like Us"	Diamond D, AK2000, Big C
5	"In Da BX"	Diamond D, Sadat X, Tons
6	"Why Yawl Hatin"	Diamond D, Brick Dawson
7	"Watch Me"	Diamond D
8	"Put it Down"	Diamond D, Sadat X
9	"Live My Life"	Diamond D, Blake Carrington
10	"U Gots 2 Go"	Diamond D, AK2000
11	"I Know You Really Want It"	Diamond D, Big C, Blake Carrington, Verse
12	"Don't Mean Shit 2 Me"	Diamond D, Brick Dawson
13	"If I Were Ya Woman"	Diamond D, AK2000, Big C
14	"So Lovely"	Diamond D
15	"2 Late"	Diamond D, Sadat X
16	"Love"	Diamond D
17	"50 Wayz"	Diamond D, Big C
