= Showbiz and A.G. =

American hip-hop duo

Showbiz & A.G.
- Also known as: Show & AG
- Origin: The Bronx, New York City, U.S.
- Genre: Hip-hop
- Years active: 1989–present
- Labels: Showbiz; PayDay; London; FFRR; D.I.T.C.
- Members: Showbiz; A.G.

Showbiz and A.G. (also shortened as Show and AG) is an American hip-hop duo from The Bronx borough of New York City, composed of record producer Rodney "Showbiz" Lemay (born July 7, 1969) and rapper Andre "A.G." Barnes (born September 26, 1970). The duo formed soon after their debut on the song "Back to Back Rhyming" from Lord Finesse's Funky Technician album and joined the hip-hop collective D.I.T.C. along with Lord Finesse, Diamond D, Fat Joe, O.C., Buckwild and Big L.

== Career ==
=== 1990s ===
The duo's first release was an extended play Soul Clap, self-released in late 1991 via their own independent record label, Showbiz Records. The EP included a song "Diggin' in the Crates" with verses from Diamond D and Lord Finesse, which became the name of a bigger group called D.I.T.C. They signed with Payday/London Records and re-released the EP on March 17, 1992, as "Party Groove"/"Soul Clap" (also known as Showbiz & A.G.). On September 22, 1992, the duo released their debut studio album, Runaway Slave, with guest appearances from Diamond D, Lord Finesse, Dres, and the first album appearance of Big L. In 1993, Showbiz became popular for producing KRS-One's single "Sound of da Police".

In 1994, Showbiz and A.G. had a guest spot on Black Sheep's second album Non-Fiction, on the track "E.F.F.E.C.T.". Showbiz soon shortened his name to Show, changing the group name to 'Show & A.G.'. 1995 saw the release of their second studio album, Goodfellas, which featured a darker sound than their debut, as well as the absence of Showbiz rapping. It featured contributions from artists who were on Runaway Slave, plus the Ghetto Dwellas (D Flow and Party Arty), Big Cathy, Roc Raida, Method Man, Wali World and DJ Premier. The most successful song from the album was DJ Premier's 'Nyte Time' remix of the track "Next Level", an instrumental version of which was later featured in the 2002 film 8 Mile.

Following the release of EP-turned-LP Full Scale project in 1998, the duo began concentrating on their work with D.I.T.C., as well as solo projects. In 1999, the duo appeared on A.G.'s first solo studio album, The Dirty Version, which also featured contributions from seven out of eight D.I.T.C. members (Big L was the only absent member due to being murdered on February 15 later same year), as well as the Ghetto Dwellas, Gang Starr, KRS-One and Big Pun. Showbiz was one of the executive producers on D.I.T.C.'s self-titled group album, which was released in 2000 via Tommy Boy Records.

=== 2000s ===
After a hiatus between the release of the D.I.T.C.'s 2001 Wild Life EP and 2005, Show released his first solo album D.I.T.C. Presents Street Talk in November 2005. The album featured 18 new tracks performed by the likes of O.C., Party Arty, Milano, Fat Joe, Sean Price, and late Big Pun and Big L over Show's productions. It also saw A.G. and Show reunite as A.G. was featured on 2 of the album's songs, "Chase Game" and "You Ain't a Killer". A.G.'s second solo album titled Get Dirty Radio was released October 31, 2006, through Look Records, which featured a Show-produced song "The Struggle". In 2007, they released a new EP entitled Live Hard on D.I.T.C. Records, their first new material in nearly a decade. Showbiz teamed up with fellow producer Eric "E-Blaze" Blaze forming a production duo Born Lords. Following 2008's D.I.T.C.'s compilation album The Movement, members O.C. and A.G. released a collaborative album called Oasis in 2009, which also featured production from Born Lords.

=== 2010s ===
Following the deaths of fellow artists Big L (1999), Party Arty (2008) and Roc Raida (2009), A.G. joined his protégé duo 950 Plus to release a mixtape The 25th Hour in 2010. Later that same year of 2010, he released an album titled Everything's Berri and co-founded a small label Red Apples 45 with Ray West. In 2011, Showbiz teamed up with KRS-One for tha Godsville album. On September 9, 2012, Show and AG released the album Mugshot Music, and in 2017, they released the EP Take It Back.

== Discography ==
=== Studio albums ===
Year	Title	Peak chart positions	
Year	Title	US R&B	US Heat
1992	Runaway Slave: Released: September 22, 1992; Label: Payday/London/FFRR; Format: Cassette, CD, LP	78	—
1995	Goodfellas: Released: May 30, 1995; Label: Payday/FFRR; Format: Cassette, CD, LP	23	10
2012	Mugshot Music: Released: September 9, 2012; Label: D.I.T.C.; Format: CD, digital download, LP	—	—

=== Extended plays ===
List of extended plays, showing year released
Title	Details
Soul Clap	Released: 1991 (Re-released: March 17, 1992); Label: Showbiz/Payday/London; Format: Cassette, CD, EP
Full Scale	Released: May 24, 1998; Label: D.I.T.C.; Format: Cassette, CD, EP, LP
Live Hard	Released: December 2007; Label: D.I.T.C.; Format: CD, digital download, EP
Take It Back	Released: 2017; Label: D.I.T.C.; Format: CD, digital download, EP

=== Guest appearances (in toto) ===
- {1990}~~ 'Back to Back Rhyming'; 'Keep It Flowing'--- Funky Technician, Lord Finesse and DJ Mike Smooth
- {1992}~~ 'Yes You May'; 'Fat for the '90s'--- Return of the Funky Man, Lord Finesse
- {1993}~~ 'On da Mic'--- The Untold Truth, Illegal
- {1994}~~ 'Who's It On Pt 1'--- Theme + Echo = Krill, The Legion
- {1994}~~ 'Ya Don't Stop'--- B-Ball's Best Kept Secret, Various
- {1994}~~ 'E.F.F.E.C.T.'--- Non-Fiction, Black Sheep
- {1996}~~ 'Speak Ya Piece'; 'Showtime'--- The Awakening, Lord Finesse
- {1997}~~ '5 Fingers of Death'--- Hatred, Passions and Infidelity, Diamond D
- {1999}~~ 'True to Hip Hop'--- Cold Water Music, AIM
- {1999}~~ 'Rework the Angles'--- This or That, Dilated Peoples
- {2000}~~ 'The Club'--- The Piece Maker, Tony Touch
- {2000}~~ 'Holdin' It Down'--- The Big Picture, Big L
- {2001}~~ 'Weed & Drinks'--- Bon Appetit, O.C.
- {2001}~~ 'Rap Niggaz'--- By Design, Grand Agent
- {2002}~~ 'How It Sounds'--- D&D Project II, D&D All Stars
- {2002}~~ 'Square Biz'--- Walk of Life, Square One
- {2004}~~ 'A Day in the Life'--- White People, Handsome Boy Modeling School
- {2004}~~ 'It's Nothing'--- Milk Me, The Beanuts
- {2004}~~ 'Deceived Me'--- Skillitary, Thirstin Howl III
- {2005}~~ 'Getyourmindright'--- Dedication, Belief
- {2005}~~ 'Chase Game'; 'You Ain't a Killer'--- Street Talk, Showbiz
- {2006}~~ 'My Life'--- Two/Three, Dabyre
- {2006}~~ 'Low Life'--- Exodus into Unheard Rhythms, Oh No
- {2007}~~ '2K007'--- 2K7, Dan the Automator
- {2008}~~ 'Poppin' Pockets (Remix)'--- Brokelore, Grip Grand
- {2010}~~ 'There Will Be Blood'--- Nineteen Ninety Now, Buckwild & Celph Titled
- {2013}~~ 'Glory (Finish Hard)'--- PA2, Marco Polo
- {2016}~~ 'Hakim'--- The Cornerstone of the Corner Store, Vinnie Paz
- {2020}~~ 'Children of Never'--- Eastern Medicine, Western Illness, Preservation
- {2024}~~ 'You Found Both'--- To Relieve The Sorrow-Laden Heart, The Mighty Rhino

== Showbiz production credits ==
Name	Artist	Year	Album
Back to Back Rhyming; Just a Little Something	Lord Finesse & DJ MIke Smooth	1990	The Funky Technician
Return of the Funky Man (Clean Remix)	Lord Finesse	1991	—N/a
Lord Finesse Intro {co-produced by Lord Finesse}; Return of the Funky Man; Yes You May; Party Over Here	Lord Finesse	1992	Return of the Funky Man
Set It Off Troop	Lord Finesse	1992	Class Act (soundtrack)
Tennessee (Remix)	Arrested Development	1992	—N/a
Step to Me {co-produced by Diamond D}	Diamond & the Psychotic Neurotics	1992	Stunts, Blunts & Hip Hop
Sally Got a One Track Mind (Remix)	Diamond & the Psychotic Neurotics	1993	—N/a
Bounce ta This (Remix)	Showbiz & A.G.	1993	—N/a
You Been Played (Showbiz Street Mix)	Smooth	1993	—N/a
I Got a Man (Hip Hop Mix)	Positive K	1993	—N/a
I'ma Hit That; I Got This in a Smash	Fat Joe da Gangsta	1993	Represent
Sound of da Police	KRS-One	1993	Return of the Boom Bap
Mic Mechanism; Fine Tune da Mic; Bring It On (Remix)	Maestro Fresh-Wes	1994	Naaah, Dis Kid Can't Be from Canada?!!
Who's It On Part 1	The Legion	1994	Theme + Echo = Krill
Do Whatcha Gotta; Blunts	Nice & Smooth	1994	Jewel of the Nile
Breakfast @ Denny's (Showbiz Remix)	Buckshot Lefonque	1994	—N/a>
North South East West (Remix)	Black Sheep	1995	—N/a
No Endz No Skinz; I Don't Understand It	Big L	1995	Lifestylez ov da Poor & Dangerous
Moon in Cancer	Urban Thermo Dynamics	1995	Manifest Destiny
Firewater	Big Pun, Raekwon, Fat Joe	1995	—N/a
Stone to the Bone (Remix)	Big Jaz	1995	The D&D Project
Represent the Real Hip-Hop	KRS One & Das EFx	1995	KRS-One / Hold It Down
Stages and Lights	Sadat X	1996	Wild Cowboys
3ree (A Means To Be) (Showbiz Remix)	Attica Blues	1997	Non-album single
The Ultimate (Showbiz Remix)	The Artifacts	1997	That's Them
Wishful Thinking	Big Pun, Fat Joe, Kool G Rap, B-Real	1997	Non-album single
Confrontations	Organized Konfusion	1997	The Equinox
A Friend; Blowe	KRS-One	1997	I Got Next
The Crow	O.C.	1997	Jewelz
Parental Discretion	Big Pun	1998	Capital Punishment
Mind I.C. Mine	Scaramanga	1998	Seven Eyes... Seven Horns
Be With	A.G.	1999	The Dirty Version
Get Yours; Way of Life; Where Ya At; Drop it Heavy; Stand Strong (Remix); Weekend Nights	D.I.T.C.	2000	D.I.T.C.
The Club	Tony Touch, D.I.T.C.	2000	The Piece Maker
The Triboro	Big L	2000	The Big Picture
Frontline	The Pharcyde	2000	Plain Rap
That's Bless	Tony Touch	2002	The Last of the Pro Ricans
Rappin' Exercise	Khaleel	2010	DJ Premier Presents.... Get Used 2 Us
Everything to Gain	Papoose	2015	You Can't Stop Destiny
Bricks at the Pen	.38 Spesh & Kool G Rap	2018	Son of G. Rap
