= Payday Records =

American hip hop record label based New York

Payday Records, Inc.
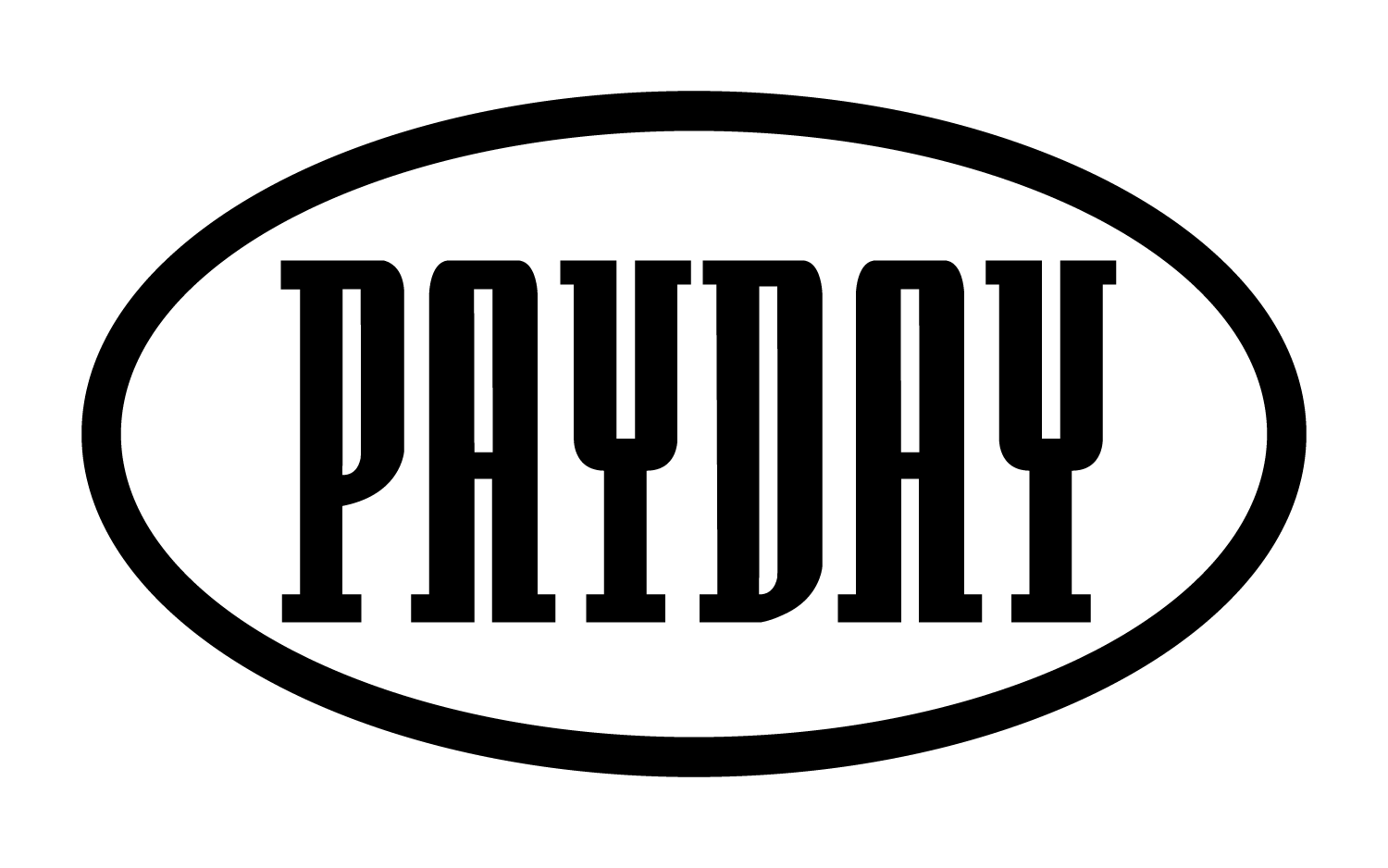
- Type: Record label
- Industry: Music
- Genre: Hip hop
- Founded: 1992; 34 years ago; New York City, New York, U.S.
- Founder: Patrick Moxey
- Website: paydayrecords.net

Payday Records, Inc. is a New York-based hip hop label that was launched in 1992 by Patrick Moxey. The label began in association with FFRR/London Records, and released in the UK and Europe via London/PolyGram Records. Artists launched via Payday Records include Jeru the Damaja, Jay Z, Mos Def (via his first group U.T.D.), Showbiz & A.G., and WC and the Maad Circle. Other associated productions include the works of DJ Premier and Guru of Gang Starr.

The label officially relaunched on November 2, 2017, with "Our Streets," a record by DJ Premier and A$AP Ferg. They have also released Pell's girasoul EP.

In 2017, Payday Records catalog is now distributed by Ultra Records (later Sony Music Group; now Warner Music Group).

== Current artists ==
- DJ Premier
- Pell

== Former artists ==
- 1st Down
- Big Shug
- Gang Starr
- Group Home
- Jay-Z (1994 — 1995)
- Jeru the Damaja
- Junior Tucker
- Kaliphz
- M-Beat
- O.C.
- Radamiz
- Showbiz and A.G.
- Urban Species
- Urban Thermo Dynamics
- The Watts Prophets
- WC
- WC and the Maad Circle
