= Lord Finesse =

American rapper

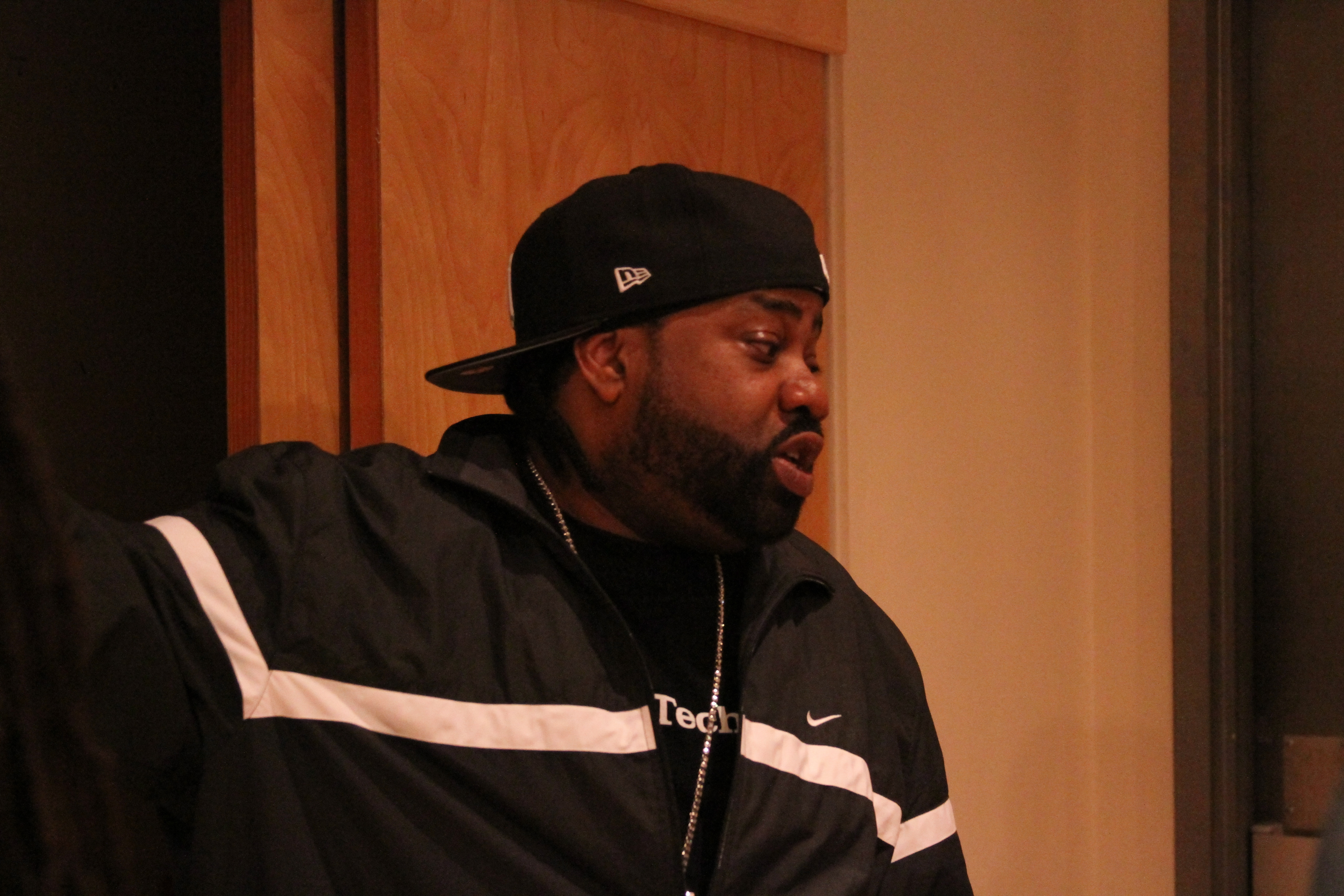
- Lord Finesse at a Combat Jack Show in 2014

Background information
- Born: Robert Hall Jr. February 19, 1970 (age 56); The Bronx, New York City, U.S.
- Genres: Hip-hop
- Occupations: Rapper; record producer; songwriter
- Years active: 1989–present
- Labels: Wild Pitch; EMI; Giant; Reprise; Warner Bros.; Penalty; Tommy Boy

Robert A. Hall Jr. (born February 19, 1970), known by his stage name Lord Finesse, is an American rapper and hip-hop producer from The Bronx, New York, best known as the leader of the D.I.T.C. crew. About.com ranked him number 29 on its list of the Top-50 Hip-Hop Producers.

== Early life and education ==
Finesse was born Robert A. Hall, Jr. on February 19, 1970 in The Bronx. He was raised in the South Bronx during the 1970s His grandmother raised Finesse when he was younger living in Forest Projects, a public housing project in neighborhood of Morrisania in the Bronx. He met future D.I.T.C. rapper/producer Diamond D at St. Augustine Catholic School. He attended Morris High School. Finesse would often visit a childhood friend at DeWitt Clinton High School, where they held freestyle battle sessions with other students. At that time, he met A.G. (Andre Barnes) who was a student at DeWitt Clinton High School, another future D.I.T.C. member who was an aspiring rapper. He first started rapping at the age of 12.

== Career ==
In 1989, Finesse and his former partner DJ Mike Smooth signed with Wild Pitch Records, home of other popular hip-hop artists such as Gang Starr, Main Source, Chill Rob G, Percee P and O.C.. Around that year, he signed a deal with Ice-T's Rhyme Syndicate Management after he lost in a rap battle in a music seminar when he competed with other rappers. In 1990, the duo released their debut album Funky Technician. The album featured production from future star beat-makers DJ Premier, Diamond D and Showbiz. Soon after, Finesse formed the popular New York underground crew D.I.T.C., an acronym for "Diggin In The Crates", together with Showbiz and A.G. and Diamond D. Future members included Fat Joe, O.C., Buckwild, and Big L.

Finesse returned as a solo artist in early 1992 with his second effort, Return of the Funky Man. The album featured guest appearances from Percee P and AG. The album's title track peaked at number 13 on the Hot Rap Singles chart.Return of the Funky Man also included a couple of songs that were produced by Finesse himself, and this would be the start of a career as a much respected hip-hop producer. In 1994 Finesse made a production appearance on The Notorious B.I.G.'s classic debut Ready to Die, on the track "Suicidal Thoughts". In 1995, he produced a big portion of Big L's debut album Lifestylez Ov Da Poor & Dangerous, including the single "M.V.P." and made an appearance on one of the album's highlight songs "Da Graveyard". He returned as an artist in 1996 with the now rare 12" single "Check The Method" and then the acclaimed album The Awakening. Finesse produced the entire album himself, and enlisted a large number of guests, including KRS-One, MC Lyte, Akinyele, Diamond D, Showbiz & A.G., O.C. and Kid Capri. The underground single "Actual Facts" featuring Sadat X, Large Professor and Grand Puba, was included as a hidden track on the album.

Finesse hasn't released a studio album since this effort, but has continued his production work. In 1997, he produced the title track to O.C.'s acclaimed effort Jewelz and the track "Channel 10" off of Capone-N-Noreaga's debut The War Report. Finesse released a mixtape called Diggin' On Blue in 1999. Later in the year, he produced the track "The Message" on Dr. Dre's seminal 2001 album. Finesse is currently working on a Funky Technician remix project, as well as a new D.I.T.C. album. Along with these projects, he and DJ Premier are working on a posthumous Big L album.

In 1998, Finesse provided the vocal sample on the hook to "The Rockafeller Skank", a hit single by British musician Fatboy Slim from his album You've Come a Long Way, Baby. The song features Finesse's repeated line "Right about now, the funk soul brother. Check it out now, the funk soul brother". This line was lifted from the song "Vinyl Dogs Vibe" by the Vinyl Dogs with the spoken word intro provided by Finesse, edited from the full line, "Check it out right about now. It's no other than the funk soul brother, the Lord Finesse. And you're welcome to the world of the Vinyl Dogs right about now. So if you're diggin', peep how we do it like this"

Lord Finesse returned to the mic on Handsome Boy Modeling School's album White People in 2004. He was featured on the song entitled "Rock 'N' Roll (Could Never Hip-Hop Like This) pt. 2", collaborating with famous old-school DJ's Grand Wizard Theodore and Jazzy Jay. Chester Bennington and Mike Shinoda from Linkin Park make appearances, as well as Rahzel, then of The Roots.

In June 2012, Finesse filed a $10 million lawsuit against Rostrum Records and DatPiff for the use of a sample of Finesse's song "Hip 2 Da Game" used in Mac Miller's 2010 song "Kool Aid & Frozen Pizza". In January 2013 the lawsuit was settled for an undisclosed amount.

In 2014, Lord Finesse produced a remix for Swedish rap group Looptroop Rockers' single "Another Love Song".

In July 2020, he released a new remix album, Motown State Of Mind.

== Discography ==
=== Albums ===
List of albums, with selected chart positions
Title	Album details	Peak chart positions
Title	Album details	US R&B
Funky Technician (with DJ Mike Smooth)	Released: February 6, 1990; Label: Wild Pitch/EMI Records; Format: CD, CS	93
Return of the Funky Man	Released: February 11, 1992; Label: Giant/Reprise/Warner Bros. Records; Format: CD, CS	95
The Awakening	Released: February 20, 1996; Label: Penalty/Tommy Boy/Warner Bros. Records; Format: CD, CS, LP	36

=== Singles ===
1989 - 1990
- "Baby, You Nasty"/"Track the Movement", "Funky Technician"/"Bad Mutha", "Stricly for the Ladies"/"Back to Back Rhyming"
- "Return of the Funky Man"/"Fuck Em", "Party Over Here"/"Save That Shit", "S.K.I.T.S. (Shorties Kaught In The System)" (non-album single)
- "Hip 2 Da Game"/"No Gimmicks", "Gameplan"/"Actual Facts"

=== Guest appearances ===
- [1992]~~~ 'Set It Off Troop'. -- Class Act (soundtrack)
- [1992]~ 'Represent'. -- Runaway Slave, Showbiz and A.G.
- [1992]~ 'You Know What I'm About'. -- Trespass (soundtrack)
- [1993]~~~ "You Can't Front'. -- Single. Diamond D
- [1993]~ "Off and On (freestylin' mix)". -- Single, Trends of Culture
- [1993]~ "Flip da Script". -- Mesanjarz of Funk, Mesanjarz of Funk, Lauryn Hill
- [1993]~ "On da M.I.C." -- The Untold Truth, Illegal
- [1994]~~~ "Dig on That". -- One, Two, Ground Floor
- [1994]~ "The Rhythm". -- The Mouth That Roared...?, Bas Blasta
- [1995]~~~ 'Da Graveyard'. -- Lifestylez ov da Poor & Dangerous, Big L
- [1995]~ 'Add On'. -- Goodfellas, Showbiz and A.G.
- [1997]~~~ 'Collaboration of Mics'. -- That's Them, Artifacts
- [1997]~ 'Day One'. -- Single, D.I.T.C.
- [1997]~ '5 Fingers of Death'. -- Hatred, Passions and Infidelity, Diamond D
- [1997]~ 'Run the Line (Remix)'. -- Single, Peanut Butter Wolf
- [1998]~~~ 'All Love'. -- Single, D.I.T.C.
- [1998]~ 'Dignified Soldiers / DS (Remix)'. -- Full Scale, Showbiz and A.G.
- [1998]~ 'Troopas Represent'. -- Planets, 3rd Eye
- [1999]~~~ "The Vinyl Athletes (Lord Finesse Remix)". -- Single, Muro
- [2000]~~~ 'Foundation'; 'Stand Strong'; 'Tribute'. -- D.I.T.C.
- {2000}~ 'The Club'. -- The Piece Maker, Tony Touch
- {2001}~~~ 'Know the Legend'. -- By Design, Grand Agent
- [2004]~~~ 'Rock and Roll (Could Never Hip Hop Like This) Pt. 2'-- White People, Handsome Boy Modeling School
- [2020]~~~ 'Do the Math'-- Single, The Xav

=== Selected Productions ===
Album	Artist	Track(s)	Year
Non-album single	SWV	Right Here (Funkyman Remix)	1992
Trespass (soundtrack)	Lord Finesse	You Know What I'm About	1992
Who's the Man? (soundtrack)	3rd Eye & The Group Home	Ease Up {co-produced by Jesse West}	1993
Who's the Man? (soundtrack)	The Notorious B.I.G.	Party & Bullshit (Lord's Dirty Remix)	1993
Non-album single	Jeff Redd	Show You (Finesse Remixes)	1993
Represent	Fat Joe da Gangsta	Livin' Fat	1993
Non-album single	Carson Wheeler	Soul Street (Puffy's Remix)	1993
The Untold Truth	Illegal	On da M.I.C.	1993
Trendz...	Trends of Culture	Off & On	1993
Non-album single	Kirk	Uptown Style (Laidback Remix)	1994
Ready to Die	The Notorious B.I.G.	Suicidal Thoughts	1994
Word...Life	O.C.	Ga Head	1994
Lifestylez ov da Poor & Dangerous	Big L	MVP; All Black; Street Struck; Lifestylez ov da Poor & Dangerous; Fed Up wit the Bullshit	1995
Goodfellas	Showbiz and A.G.	Add On	1995
Ruff, Rugged & Raw	Double X Posse	Money Talks {co-produced by Double X}	1995
Non-album single	Lord Finesse	Soul Plan	1996
Non-album single	Lord Finesse	Underworld Operations	1996
Chronicle of Two Losers	Ill Biskits	Let 'Em Know	1996
Non-album single	Ak Skills	Check the Flava	1996
That's Them	Artifacts	Collaboration of Mics	1997
Rhythm & Beats	Leschea	Hip Hop	1997
Non-album single	Microphone Pager	病む街 (Lord Finesse Remix)	1997
Non-album single	Posneg	No Doubt (Remix)	1997
Non-album single	Peanut Butter Wolf	Run the Line (Lord Finesse Remix)	1997
Non-album single	Walkin' Large	Do That (Remix)	1997
Non-album single	Lordz of Brooklyn	Gravesend (Lake of Fire) [Remix]	1997
Non-album single	Stephen Simmonds	Alone (Funkyman Remix)	1997
The War Report	Capone-N-Noreaga	Channel 10	1997
Jewelz	O.C.	Jewelz	1997
Non-album single	D.I.T.C.	Internationally Known {co-produced by Showbiz}	1997
Non-album single	D.I.T.C.	All Love	1998
Full Scale	Showbiz and A.G.	Put It in Your System {co-produced by Showbiz}	1998
Non-album single	Pitch Black	Show & Prove	1998
Non-album single	DJ Cam	Broadcasting Live (Remix)	1998
Foundation	Brand Nubian	The Beat Change; Love vs. Hate; Straight Outta Now Rule; U for Me	1998
Non-album single	Moomin	Big City (Sunrise Mix)	1999
The Dirty Version	A.G.	Muddslide; Underground Life	1999
Aktapuss	Akinyele	Sky's the Limit	1999
2001	Dr. Dre	The Message	1999
Non-album single	Muro, A.G.	The Vinyl Athlete (Remix)	1999
Non-album single	Rell	When Will You See	1999
D.I.T.C.	Milano	Hey Luv	2000
Big L	The Big Picture	'98 Freestyle; The Heist Revisited	2000
Capone-N-Noreaga	The Reunion	Don't Know Nobody {co-produced by Chris Liggio}	2000
Grand Agent	By Design	Know the Legend	2001
Bon Appetit	O.C.	Dr. Know	2001
Anaconda	Akinyele	Love My Bitch	2001
Terror Squad	True Story	Bring Em Back	2004
Get Dirty Radio	A.G.	We Don't Care	2006
1999	Joey Badass	Funky Ho'$	2012
The Bar Code	David Bars	Next Season	2019
Harlem's Finest: Return of the King	Big L ft. Novel	All Alone (Quiet Storm Mix)	2025

== Filmography ==
1990 House Party as Stracie Elder

== Awards and nominations ==
Year	Association	Category	Nominated work	Result
1990	DEM Awards	Best Artist	Himself	Won
1992	DEM Awards	Best Producer	Himself	Loss
1993	DEM Awards	Best Producer	Himself	Loss
