= O.C. (rapper) =

Musical artist (born 1971)

- Born: Omar Gerryl Credle; May 13, 1971 (age 55); Brooklyn, New York City, U.S.
- Genres: Hip-hop
- Occupation: Rapper
- Years active: 1990–present
- Labels: Wild Pitch; Payday; JCOR; Hieroglyphics Imperium; Mello Music

Omar Gerryl Credle (born May 13, 1971), better known by his stage name, O.C., is an American rapper and member of the group D.I.T.C. He has been involved with several underground hip-hop groups, namely Crooklyn Dodgers, Luv NY, and Perestroika.

== History ==
=== Recording career ===
Credle was born in Brooklyn, May 13, 1971, and raised in the Bushwick section. O.C. cites legends like Kool G. Rap, Rakim, Big Daddy Kane and Slick Rick as his main influences. In 1991, he made his recording debut on Organized Konfusion's "Fudge Pudge". One year later, he made an appearance on the remix of MC Serch's "Back to the Grill" (which features a young Nas) after meeting Serch on the inaugural Source tour. Following the tour, O.C. signed with Wild Pitch Records in 1994 where Serch was vice president. O.C. also met Lord Finesse and Buckwild on the first Source tour, marking his introduction to the D.I.T.C crew. After the tour he connected with Buckwild and started recording a demo that would become his debut album Word...Life.

By 1994, he had finished the album Word...Life, which included everything from his demo, along with "Time's Up," the song that would go on to be his most notable single. "Time's up" was initially a record for Pharoahe Monch from Organized Konfusion. Beyond a quick outro from Prince Po, Word...Life does not have any guest appearances; Nas was supposed to be on the album but never showed up to the studio for the recording session.

In 1997, O.C. signed to Pay Day Records, where he released his second album Jewelz, featuring collaborations with DJ Premier, Da Beatminerz and Freddie Foxxx. The single "Far From Yours" peaked at #81 on the Billboard Hot 100, making it his highest-charting single to date. O.C. is also known for his feature on the Clockers soundtrack as part of the Crooklyn Dodgers, which also featured rappers Chubb Rock and Jeru the Damaja on the now classic DJ Premier produced "Return of the Crooklyn Dodgers". This is the only time the group has ever collaborated.

Ray's Cafe was released on Red Apples 45, a small label co-founded by A.G. and West. O.C. joined D.I.T.C. for their 2016 release Sessions which was preceded by the lead single "Rock Shyt".

== Discography ==
=== Albums ===
Album information
Word...Life
- Released: October 18, 1994
- Certification: None
- Label: Wild Pitch/EMI Records
- Singles: "Time's Up"/"Time's Up (Buckwild Remix)", "Born 2 Live"/"Let It Slide"
Jewelz
- Released: August 19, 1997
- Certification: None
- Label: Payday/FFRR/PolyGram Records
- Singles: "Far From Yours"/"My World", "Can't Go Wrong"/"Dangerous"
Bon Appetit
- Released: April 24, 2001
- Certification: None
- Label: JCOR/Interscope/Universal Records
- Singles: –
Star Child
- Released: 2005
- Certification: None
- Label: Grit Records
- Singles: –
Smoke and Mirrors
- Released: 2005
- Certification: None
- Label: Hieroglyphics Imperium Recordings
- Singles: "Challenge Y'all" / "Guns And Butter"
Oasis w/ A.G.
- Released: November 24, 2009
- Certification: None
- Label: Nature Sounds
- Singles: –
Trophies w/ Apollo Brown
- Released: May 1, 2012
- Certification: None
- Label: Mello Music Group
- Singles: "Prove Me Wrong"
Ray’s Café w/ Ray West
- Released: Jan 21, 2014
- Certification: None
- Label: Red Apples 45
- Singles: "YMI"
Ray’s Café: The After Hours EP w/ Ray West
- Released: November 11, 2014
- Certification: None
- Label: Red Apples 45
- Singles: "After Hours"
Dive In w/ Debonair P
- Released: December 9, 2015
- Certification: None
- Singles:
- Label: Gentleman's Relief Records
Same Moon Same Sun
- Released: January 30, 2017
- Certification: None
- Label: DITC Studios/Slice of Spice, LLC
- Singles: "Serious"/"Good Man"
Perestroika w/ Apathy
- Released: September 22, 2017
- Certification: None
- Label: Dirty Version Records
- Singles: "Soviet Official" / "Live from the Iron Curtain" / "Globetrotters"
A New Dawn
- Released: February 16, 2018
- Certification: None
- Label: DITC Studios/Slice of Spice, LLC
Opium w/ PF CUTTIN
- Released: October 22, 2018
- Certification: None
- Label: Hendrix St Records

=== Compilations ===
The Underground King

- Released: 2006
- Label: Next Mill Entertainment/Re-Up Recordings
- Singles: –

Hidden Gems

- Released: April 3, 2007
- Certification: None
- Label: Next Mill Entertainment
- Singles: –

In Guud Taste

- Released: 2008
- Certification: None
- Label: Next Mill Entertainment
- Singles: –

O-Zone Originals

- Released: September 21, 2011
- Certification: None
- Label: No Sleep Recordings
- Singles: –

Luv NY

- Released: July 24, 2012
- Label: Ascetic Music
- Singles: –

=== Appearances ===
- 1991: "Fudge Pudge" (with Organized Konfusion: Organized Konfusion)
- 1992: "Back to the Grill [Remix]" (with MC Serch: 12")
- 1994: "Let's Organize" (with Organized Konfusion: Stress: The Extinction Agenda/A Low Down Dirty Shame (soundtrack))
- 1994: "Stop the Breaks!" (with Ron G, Raekwon, KRS-One, Killa Sin: It's On! Part 2)
- 1995: "Return of the Crooklyn Dodgers" (with Crooklyn Dodgers: Clockers [Soundtrack])
- 1995: "You Won't Go Far" (with Organized Konfusion: New Jersey Drive, Vol. 2 [Soundtrack])
- 1995: "Men V. Many" (with Mic Geronimo, Royal Flush: The Natural)
- 1996: "Give Me a Little More Time [Buckwild Remix]" (with Gabrielle: 12")
- 1996: "O Lord"; "Brainstorm P.S.K. [No Gimmicks Remix]" (with Lord Finesse: The Awakening)
- 1996: "What I Represent" (with Buckwild: America Is Dying Slowly)
- 1996: "Metal Thangz" (with Street Smartz, Pharoahe Monch: 12")
- 1997: "Love Child" (with Buckwild: Buckwild: Diggin' in the Crates)
- 1997: "Your Life" (from Soul in the Hole [soundtrack])
- 1997: "Show Me Love (QD3 Fat Boy Remix)" (with Robyn: 12")
- 1997: "Internationally Known" (with D.I.T.C.: 12")
- 1997: "Droppin' Gramma [Nick Wiz Mix]" (with Main One: 12")
- 1997: "Day One" (with D.I.T.C.: 12")
- 1997: "Crew Love" (with Jay-Z & Tone Hooker: 12")
- 1997: "Spitgame" (with Da Beatminerz: 12")
- 1998: "Full Scale"; "Dignified Soldiers"; "Time to Get This Money"; "Themes, Schemes & Dreams" (with Showbiz & A.G.: Full Scale)
- 1998: "Down 4 Whateva" (with M.O.P: First Family 4 Life)
- 1998: "Respect Mine" (with Pete Rock: Soul Survivor)
- 1998: "Action Guaranteed" (with Ras Kass: Lyricist Lounge, Volume One)
- 1998: "Watch Ya Step" (with Xperado: 12")
- 1999: "Weed Scented" (with AG, Gang Starr: The Dirty Version)
- 1999: "Burn Me Slo" (with Nightmares on Wax: 12")
- 1999: "Rollin" (with Saukrates, Masta Ace: The Underground Tapes)
- 1999: "Get Yours" (with Big L: Black Mask (soundtrack))
- 2000: "Thick"; "Foundation"; "Champagne Thoughts"; "Stand Strong"; "Tribute" (with + from D.I.T.C.)
- 2000: "Lyrical Talents" (with Muro, Diamond D: Pan Rhythm: Flight No. 11154)
- 2000: "The Triboro" (with Big L, Fat Joe, Remy Ma: The Big Picture)
- 2002: "Beyond" (with DJ JS-1: Ground Original 1)
- 2002: "Lay Down and Die" (with DJ Deuse: Art of War)
- 2003: "Lake of Fire [Remix]" (with Lordz of Brooklyn: Graffiti Roc)
- 2003: "Leben & Leben Lassen" (with Spax: Engel & Ratten)
- 2003: "The Dedication" (with Doujah Raze: 12")
- 2005: "Chase Game" (with Show & A.G.: Street Talk)
- 2006: "Nuttin' to Lose" (with El Da Sensei: The Unusual)
- 2007: "Marquee" (with Marco Polo: Port Authority)
- 2007: "No Guts No Glory" (with Snowgoons: German Lugers)
- 2007: "Soul" (with Ivan Ives: Iconoclast
- 2008: "Conquer Mentally" (with Presto, Large Professor, Sadat X: State of the Art)
- 2009: "Ridiculous" (with DJ JS-1, Pharoahe Monch: Ground Original 2: No Sell Out)
- 2009: "Move a Mountain" (with DJ Bootsie: Holidays in the Shade)
- 2009: "Food for thoughts" (with Cradle Orchestra: Velvet Ballads)
- 2010: "Trouble Shooters" (with DJ Muggs & Ill Bill: Kill Devil Hills)
- 2010: "There Will Be Blood" (with Celph Titled & Buckwild: Nineteen Ninety Now)
- 2010: "Warsaw Outdoors" (with HiFi Banda, A.G., Boogie Blind: 23:55)
- 2010: "Nostalgic" (with DJ Perro: Praedictus 2 from Filters)
- 2011: "Life Word" (with DJ JS-1: Ground Original 3: No One Cares)
- 2011: "Free Ya Mind" (with Blastah Beatz: Graduate Studies)
- 2011: "Life & Time" (with Murs, Ab-Soul: Love & Rockets, Vol. 1)
- 2012: "Prestige of a King" (with Mello Music Group: Self Sacrifice)
- 2012: "Don't Worry" (with Showbiz & A.G.: Mugshot Music)
- 2012: "Mic Bless'n Gun Press'n Impress'n" (with Bumpy Knuckles: Ambition)
- 2013: "Hello Everybody (with Neek the Exotic, Satchel Page, Sadat X: Hustle Don't Stop)
- 2013: "Power" (with Ill Bill, Cormega: The Grimy Awards)
- 2013: "Astonishing" (with Marco Polo, Large Professor, Inspectah Deck: PA2: The Director's Cut)
- 2013: "Catch Wreck" (with Kid Tsunami: Underground Nation)
- 2014: "Smash" (with Prince Po, Oh No, Pharoahe Monch: The Album)
- 2014: "Light Years" (with DJ Skizz, Roc Marciano, A.G.: 12")
- 2014: "Deep Breath" (with DJ Doom & Blacastan: 12")
- 2014: "On the Bklyn Side" (with Illa Ghee, Steele: Social Graffiti)
- 2014: "Turn the Tables" (with DJ JS-1: 12")
- 2014: "First 2 Rise Pt. 2" (with Vstylez, Royce da 5'9": At Odds Till I'm Even)
- 2015: "Revolutionary Ride Music" (with DJ EFN, Your Old Droog, Royce Da 5'9", Reks: Another Time)
- 2015: "In the Moment" (with Apollo Brown: Grandeur)
- 2015: "What U Kno" (from In Ya Ear Recordings Presents: In Session Volume 1)
- 2016: "Don't Touch That Dial"; "Run for Your Life" (with Apathy, Ras Kass: Handshakes with Snakes)
- 2016: "Hakim" (with Vinnie Paz, A.G.: The Cornerstone of the Corner Store).
- 2016: "Reverse Engineering" (with Ras Kass, Torae: Intellectual Property #So12)
- 2016: "Genuine Article", "Right What I Write" (with TRUTH: From Ashes to Kingdom Come)
- 2017: "16 and Out" (with Show & A.G.: Take It Back)
- 2018: "Street Corner Shit" (with Rasheed Chappell: First Brick)
- 2018: "Know It" (with Shame: Genesis 98)
- 2018: "The Science"; "Recovery" (with Showbiz: A Room Therapy)
- 2019: "Black Sharpie" (with Dirt Platoon: Get Ya Handz Dirty)
- 2019: "Got It Covered" (with Diamond D: The Diam Piece 2)
- 2021: "Spontaneous" (with Jeru the Damaja: 12")
- 2021: "Party & Booze" (with Grand Daddy I.U.: The Essence)
- 2021: "Street Smartz" (with Eric Bobo, Stu Bangas, Ill Bill: Empires)
- 2021: "Raised Around Wolves" (with Kut One: 12")
- 2022: "For Everyone" (with Rising Suns: 'Rising Suns')
- 2022: "All In" (with Ghettosocks, DK, Moka Only: Listen to the Masters)
- 2023: "Convertible Steez" (with Stallone & Weathers: The Cost of Doing Business)
- 2023: "Dreams Part 2" (with Ray West: Macaroni Ray)
- 2024: "Highest Degree" (with High & Mighty: 12")
