= D.I.T.C. =

Hip hop collective from New York

- Origin: New York City, U.S.
- Genre: Hip-hop
- Years active: 1992–present
- Label: Tommy Boy
- Past members: O.C.; Buckwild; Lord Finesse; Big L; Diamond D; Fat Joe; Showbiz and A.G.

The Diggin' in the Crates Crew, commonly known as D.I.T.C., is an American hip hop collective formed in 1992 in New York City. The collective's name derives from the act of seeking out records to sample for production. The collective is composed of Lord Finesse, Diamond D, Big L, O.C., Fat Joe, Buckwild, Showbiz and A.G.. Its members have achieved substantial and consistent recognition in underground rap circles, having often collaborated with undiscovered talents and underground hip hop artists alongside mainstream rappers.

== History ==
=== Later years ===
On December 4, 2008, D.I.T.C. member Party Arty unexpectedly died of unspecified health complications, aged 31. In 2008, Freddie Foxxx (using his Bumpy Knuckles pseudonym) released the long-shelved Crazy Like A Foxxx album. The second of two discs featured DITC produced demo versions of the original tracks dating to 1993. DITC production contrasted with the Jailhouse version of production from 1994.

In 2011, Showbiz stated that the crew itself is now defunct and will no longer create any new albums in the future citing musical creative differences. However, member O.C. confirmed that the group would indeed record a brand new album with production so far from Diamond D and Lord Finesse, while awaiting Buckwild. He stated that their deceased member Big L would not want them to end their legacy like this. On October 28, 2016, D.I.T.C. released Sessions, preceded by the lead single "Rock Shyt".

== Discography ==
=== Studio Albums ===
- D.I.T.C. (Tommy Boy, 2000)
- Sessions (D.I.T.C. Studios / The Fam Agency, 2016)

=== Compilation Albums ===
- Live at Tramps New York (Vol.1 + Vol. 2) (ZYX Music, 2000)
- All Love (Next Level Recordings / File Rec Inc., 2000)
- D.I.T.C. - The Official Version (D.I.T.C./Fat Beats, 2000)
- D.I.T.C. Presents Wild Life (EP) (Wild Life Entertainment, 2001)
- Rare & Unreleased (D.I.T.C. Records, 2007)
- Unreleased Production 1994 (D.I.T.C. Records, 2008)
- The Movement (D.I.T.C. Records, 2008)
- Rare & Unreleased Vol. 2 (D.I.T.C. Records, 2009)
- The Remix Project (D.I.T.C. Entertainment / Slice of Spice, 2014)
- D.I.T.C. Studios (D.I.T.C. Entertainment / Slice of Spice, 2016)
- D.I.T.C. Studios Vol. 2 (D.I.T.C. Studios, 2019)
