= Diamond D =

American hip-hop producer (born 1968)

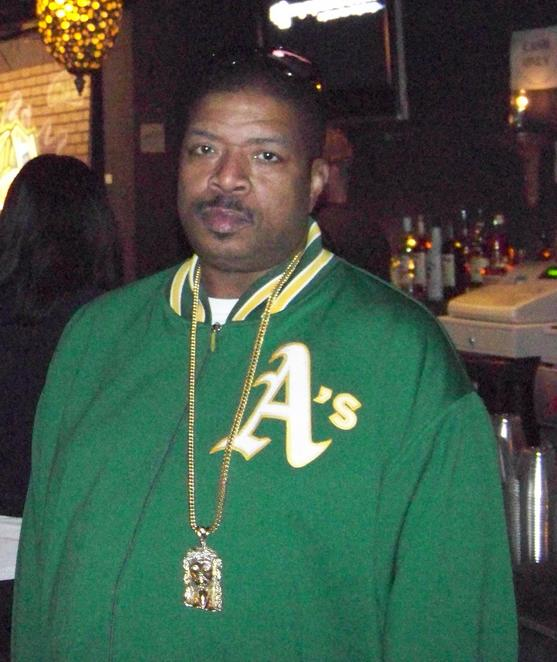
- Diamond D at A3C in Atlanta

Background information
- Also known as: Diamond D
- Born: Joseph Kirkland; April 5, 1968 (age 58); The Bronx, New York City, U.S.
- Genre: Hip-hop
- Occupations: Record producer; rapper
- Years active: 1987–present
- Labels: Chemistry; Mercury; PolyGram; Diamond Mine; Babygrande; U-Force Productions
- Formerly of: D.I.T.C.

Joseph Kirkland (born April 5, 1968), better known by his stage name Diamond D (or simply Diamond), is an American hip hop MC and record producer from The Bronx, New York City, and one of the founding members of the Diggin' in the Crates Crew, abbreviated as D.I.T.C.

== Early years ==
Growing up in Forest Houses in The Bronx, Diamond D was influenced by local DJs, DJ Hutch and DJ Supreme. During his youth the two DJs would let him perform on their turntables. At the beginning of his career as a producer, Diamond spent many hours at Jazzy Jay's studio on Allerton Avenue in The Bronx. He credits Jay for inspiring him to buy a sampler and teaching him various production techniques. In a 2017 interview he said, "I learned about 95% of my production skills from him. And he was ahead of his time."

== Career ==
In addition to Jazzy Jay's teachings, Diamond credited Brand Nubian member Grand Puba as his inspiration to start rapping. An early guest appearance on A Tribe Called Quest's The Low End Theory track "Show Business" helped make people more aware of him as an artist.

The following year he released his debut record Stunts, Blunts & Hip Hop. In a 2017 interview, Diamond described the album as, "just a collection of beats and records I was just setting aside. It was more about 'One day I want to do something with this' ideas. And about 80% of that album I got from those records."

Diamond's favorite experience from making Stunts, Blunts & Hip Hop was recording the vocals for the song "Check One, Two." He credits producer The 45 King with clearing the samples for that beat. It took him 30 minutes to construct the beat for one of the album's best-known tracks, "Sally Got A One Track Mind".

In 1996, Diamond won a Grammy Award for his production on the title track from The Fugees' The Score album. He later described the experience as "just a bad memory" and declined to talk about it in an interview.

To promote his 1997 album Hatred, Passions and Infidelity, Mercury Records compiled a promotional vinyl called Diamond Jewels that included the Stunts, Blunts & Hip Hop songs "Best Kept Secret', "*!*! What U Heard", and "Sally Got A One Track Mind".

== Discography ==
=== Albums ===
Album information
Stunts, Blunts & Hip Hop
- Released: September 22, 1992
- Billboard 200 chart position: -
- R&B/Hip-Hop chart position: No. 47
- Singles: "Best Kept Secret"/"Freestyle (Yo, That's That Shit)," "Sally Got a One Track Mind"/"Check One, Two," "Fuck What U Heard"/"I'm Outta Here"
Hatred, Passions and Infidelity
- Released: August 26, 1997
- Billboard 200 chart position: -
- R&B/Hip-Hop chart position: No. 40
- Singles: "The Hiatus"/"No Wonduh (The Projects)," "J.D.'s Revenge"/"This One"
Grown Man Talk
- Released: March 1, 2003
- Billboard 200 chart position: -
- R&B/Hip-Hop chart position: -
- Singles:
The Diamond Mine
- Released: September 15, 2005
- Billboard 200 chart position: -
- R&B/Hip-Hop chart position: -
- Singles:
I'm Not Playin' (with Master Rob as Ultimate Force)
- Released: June 2007
- Billboard 200 chart position: -
- R&B/Hip-Hop chart position: -
- Singles: "I'm Not Playing", "Girls/I'm in Effect/Supreme Diamond D"
The Huge Hefner Chronicles
- Released: October 14, 2008
- Billboard 200 chart position: -
- R&B/Hip-Hop chart position: -
- Singles:
The Diam Piece
- Released: September 30, 2014
- Billboard 200 chart position: -
- R&B/Hip-Hop chart position: -
- Singles: "Rap Life"
The Diam Piece 2
- Released: May 10, 2019
- Billboard 200 chart position: -
- R&B/Hip-Hop chart position: -
- Singles:
Gotham (with Talib Kweli)
- Released: April 16, 2021
- Billboard 200 chart position: -
- R&B/Hip-Hop chart position: -
- Singles: "On Mamas", "The Quiet One", "Attention Span"
The Rear View
- Released: August 19, 2022
- Billboard 200 chart position: -
- R&B/Hip-Hop chart position: -
- Singles:
The Diam Piece 3: Intrium
- Released: August 16, 2024
- Billboard 200 chart position: -
- R&B/Hip-Hop chart position
- Singles: "The Kings", "My People"
The Diam Piece 3: Duo
- Released: January 10, 2025
- Billboard 200 chart position: -
- R&B/Hip-Hop chart position: -
- Singles: "T.S.N.Y.", "Get With It", "Keep on Steppin'"

=== As featured artist ===
List of singles, with selected chart positions, showing year released and album name
Title	Year	Peak chart positions			Album
Title	Year	US	US R&B	US Rap	Album
"One for the Money" (Royce da 5'9" featuring Skillz and Diamond D)	2012	—	—	—	Non-album single

=== As featured ===
Song	Year	Artist
Show Business	1991	ATCQ, Sadat X, Lord Jamar
Diggin' in the Crates	1992	Show & A.G., Lord Finesse
Punks Jump Up to Get Beat Down (Remix)	1992	Brand Nubian
Still Diggin'	1992	Show & A.G.
CrumbSnatcher	1993	Illegal
Watch the Sound!	1993	Fat Joe, Grand Puba
I Can't Take No More	1993	Class A Felony
Slappin' Suckas Silly Remix	1993	Yaggfu Front
Keep It Real	1994	A.D.O.R.
Word Iz Bond	1994	House of Pain
I Got Planz	1994	Scientifik
Ya Don't Stop	1994	Dana Barros & Cedric Ceballos, A.G., Sadat X, Grand Puba
The Next Level	1995	The Alkaholiks
You Want It	1995	Show & A.G.
How They Want It	1995	Big Red
What I Wanna Do....	1995	Veronica, Sadat X
Speak Ya Piece	1996	Lord Finesse, marquee, A.G.
Diamond's Are a Girl's Best Friend	1996	DJ Polo
The Score	1996	The Fugees
When the Ship Goes Down (Diamond's Seafaring Remix)	1996	Cypress Hill
Hot This Year	1998	Kid Capri, Brand Nubian
Time to Get This Money; Put It in Your System	1998	Show & A.G.
Nowhere to Go	1999	A.G.
When It Rains It Pours	1999	Diamond D
Got Dat?; Live Shit	2000	El da Sensei
X-Man	2000	Sadat X
Lyrical Talents	2000	Muro, O.C.
Best at That	2001	Da Beatminerz
The Omen	2002	Aim
Welcome to the World of Joni Rewind	2002	Joni Rewind, Lord Finesse
Feedback	2003	Akrobatik
Pressure	2005	Med
CD Only Bonus Track	2022	Open Mike Eagle, Aesop Rock
