= Remy Ma discography =

Artist discography

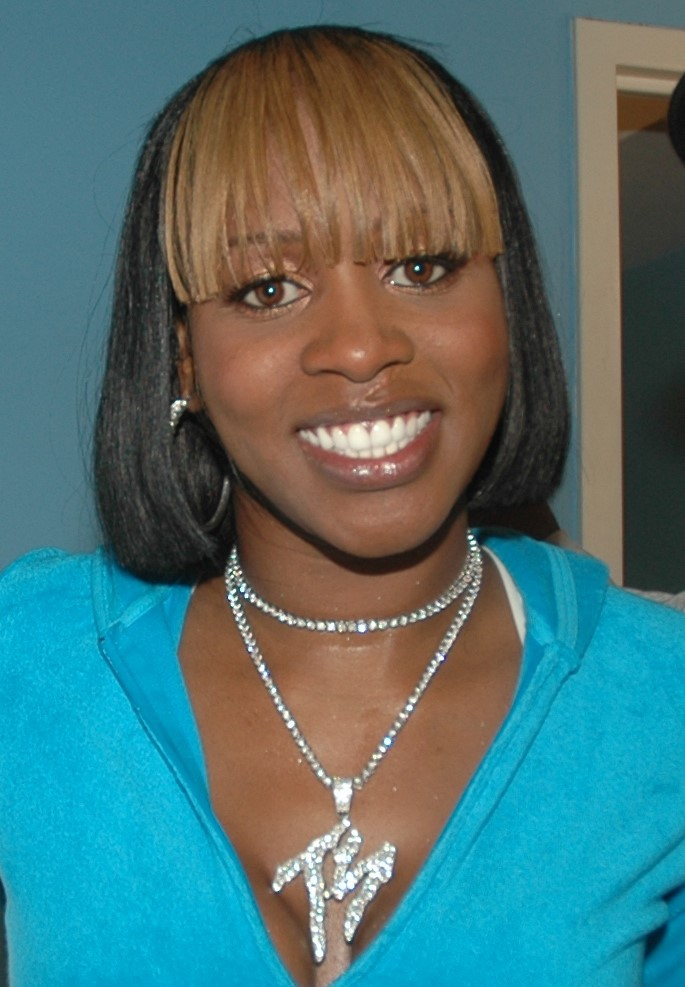
- Remy at 106 & Park, 2005
- Studio albums: 2
- EPs: 1
- Singles: 13
- Mixtapes: 5

The discography of Remy Ma consists of two studio albums, five mixtapes and 19 singles (27 as a featured performer).

Her debut studio album, There's Something About Remy: Based on a True Story, was released on February 7, 2006 and reached number 33 on the Billboard 200, number seven on the Top R&B/Hip-Hop Albums chart, and number two on the Top Rap Albums chart. The album's singles include "Whuteva" and the Billboard Hot 100-charting "Conceited (There's Something About Remy)", as well as "Feels So Good" (featuring Ne-Yo).

Her second studio album, Plata O Plomo, a collaboration with Fat Joe, was released on February 10, 2017 and reached number 44 on the Billboard 200, number 19 on the Top R&B/Hip-Hop Albums chart, and number 12 on the Top Rap Albums chart. It was preceded by "All the Way Up", which became Ma's highest-charting single on the Hot 100, reaching number 27, and was certified triple platinum by the Recording Industry Association of America.

In addition to her albums and singles, Ma has released five mixtapes: Most Anticipated (2005), The BX Files (2007), Shesus Khryst (2007), BlasRemy (2008), and I'm Around (2014).

== Albums ==
=== Studio albums ===
List of albums, with selected chart positions
Title	Album details	Peak chart positions			Sales
Title	Album details	US	US R&B /HH	US Rap	Sales
There's Something About Remy: Based on a True Story	Released: February 7, 2006; Label: SRC, Universal, Terror Squad; Format: CD, LP, digital download	33	7	2	US: 160,000 (as of 2007)

=== Collaboration albums ===
List of albums, with selected chart positions
Title	Album details	Peak chart positions		
Title	Album details	US	US R&B /HH	US Rap
Plata O Plomo (with Fat Joe)	Released: February 10, 2017; Label: Terror Squad, E1; Format: Digital download	44	19	12

== Extended plays ==
Title	EP details
Alimony	Released: September 25, 2026; Label: Reminisce Records, DNA Music Group, Hitmaker Distro; Formats: Digital download

== Mixtapes ==
Title	Album details
Most Anticipated	Released: November 27, 2005; Label: Howie McDuffie Music Group; Formats: Digital download
The BX Files	Released: August 28, 2007; Label: Sure Shot Recordings; Formats: CD, digital download
Shesus Khryst	Released: August 28, 2007; Label: Howie McDuffie Music Group; Formats: Digital download
BlasRemy	Released: September 30, 2008; Label: Amalgam Entertainment; Formats: CD, digital download
I'm Around	Released: November 18, 2014; Label: Remynisce Music; Formats: Digital download

== Singles ==
=== As lead artist ===
List of singles as lead artist, with selected chart positions and certifications, showing year released and album name
Title	Year	Peak chart positions							Certifications	Album
Title	Year	US	US R&B /HH	US Rap	US Rhy.	CAN	FRA	UK	Certifications	Album
"Monster" (featuring Swizz Beatz)	2002	—	—	—	—	—	—	—		Non-album single
"Whuteva"	2005	—	79	—	—	—	—	—		There's Something About Remy: Based on a True Story
"Conceited (There's Something About Remy)"	2005	90	25	17	—	—	—	—	RMNZ: Gold	There's Something About Remy: Based on a True Story
"Feels So Good" (featuring Ne-Yo)	2006	— (Note: "Feels So Good" did not enter the Billboard Hot 100, but peaked at number one on the Bubbling Under Hot 100 Singles chart.)	20	11	40	—	—	—		There's Something About Remy: Based on a True Story
"All the Way Up" (with Fat Joe featuring French Montana and Infared)	2016	27	9	5	4	46	85	157	RIAA: 3× Platinum; BPI: Gold; SNEP: Platinum; RMNZ: Gold; FIMI: Gold; IFPI : Gold	Plata O Plomo
"Cookin" (with Fat Joe and French Montana featuring RySoValid)	2016	—	—	—	—	—	—	—		Plata O Plomo
"Money Showers" (with Fat Joe featuring Ty Dolla Sign)	2016	— (Note: "Money Showers" did not enter the Billboard Hot 100, but peaked at number ten on the Bubbling Under Hot 100 Singles chart.)	46	—	—	—	—	—		Plata O Plomo
"Heartbreak" (with Fat Joe featuring The-Dream)	2017	—	—	—	—	—	—	—		Plata O Plomo
"Shether"	2017	— (Note: "Shether" did not enter the Billboard Hot 100, but peaked at number nineteen on the Bubbling Under Hot 100 Singles chart.)	— (Note: "Shether" did not enter the Hot R&B/Hip-Hop Songs chart, but peaked at number 3 on the Bubbling Under R&B/Hip-Hop Songs chart.)	—	—	—	—	—		Non-album singles
"Wake Me Up" (featuring Lil' Kim)	2017	— (Note: "Wake Me Up" did not enter the Billboard Hot 100, but peaked at number fifteen on the Bubbling Under Hot 100 Singles chart.)	— (Note: "Wake Me Up" did not enter the Hot R&B/Hip-Hop Songs chart, but peaked at number 2 on the Bubbling Under R&B/Hip-Hop Songs chart.)	—	—	—	—	—		Non-album singles
"Melanin Magic" (featuring Chris Brown)	2018	—	— (Note: "Melanin Magic" did not enter the Hot R&B/Hip-Hop Songs chart, but peaked at number 29 on the R&B/Hip-Hop Airplay chart.)	—	24	—	—	—		Non-album singles
"Company" (featuring A Boogie wit da Hoodie)	2018	—	—	—	—	—	—	—		Non-album singles
"New Thang" (with French Montana)	2018	—	—	—	—	—	—	—		Non-album singles
"The Mecca" (with Nas, Ghostface Killah, Styles P, Dave East and Rahmadusprime)	2020	—	—	—	—	—	—	—		Non-album singles
"Back Outside" (with Fat Joe and Cool & Dre)	2021	—	—	—	—	—	—	—		Non-album singles
"Godmother"	2021	—	—	—	—	—	—	—		Non-album singles
"Outta Control" (with Fat Joe and Cool & Dre)	2024	—	—	—	—	—	—	—		Non-album singles
"W.Y.F.L." (with DJ MAC and CrashDummy)	2026	—	—	—	—	—	—	—		Alimony
"Ever Since U Left Me" (Big Bronx Remix) (with French Montana & Max B)	2026	— (Note: "Ever Since U Left Me (Big Bronx Remix)" did not enter the Billboard Hot 100, but peaked at number nine on the Digital Song Sales chart.)	—	—	—	—	—	—		Non-album singles
"Put Em On"	2026	—	—	—	—	—	—	—		Non-album singles
"Wanna Go"	2026	—	—	—	—	—	—	—		Non-album singles
"Why I Get Married?" (featuring Keke Wyatt and ROE)	2026	—	—	—	—	—	—	—		Alimony
"—" denotes a recording that did not chart or was not released in that territory.

=== As featured artist ===
List of singles as a featured artist, with selected chart positions, showing year released and album name
Title	Year	Peak chart positions				Certifications	Album
Title	Year	US	US R&B /HH	US Rap	UK	Certifications	Album
"Ante Up" (Remix) (M.O.P. featuring Busta Rhymes, Teflon and Remy Ma)	2001	—	74	19	7	BPI: Gold	
"Lean Back" (Terror Squad featuring Fat Joe, Remy Ma)	2004	1	1	1	24	RIAA: Gold; RIAA: Gold (Mastertone); BPI: Gold; BVMI: Gold; PMB: Gold	True Story
"Take Me Home" (Terror Squad featuring Fat Joe, Remy Ma, Armageddon and Dre)	2005	62	22	19	—		True Story
"Girlfight" (Remix) (Brooke Valentine featuring Da Brat, Remy Ma and Ms. B)	2005	—	—	—	—		Non-album singles
"Where da Cash At" (Currensy featuring Lil Wayne and Remy Ma)	2006	—	73	—	—		Non-album singles
"Bucket Naked" (Remix) (Papoose featuring Remy Ma)	2010	—	—	—	—		Non-album singles
"Whats My Name" (Papoose featuring Remy Ma)	2013	—	—	—	—		The Nacirema Dream
"Ice Cream" (Audrey Rose featuring Remy Ma and Fetty Wap)	2014	—	—	—	—		Chapter One: Gun & Roses
"She Don't Like Me" (Remix) (Ron Browz featuring Remy Ma)	2015	—	—	—	—		Non-album singles
"Crown Me" (Billy Bangles featuring Remy Ma)	2015	—	—	—	—		Non-album singles
"DJ Absolut Freestyle" (DJ Absolut featuring Remy Ma)	2015	—	—	—	—		Non-album singles
"4 da Win" (N.O.R.E. featuring Memphis Bleek and Remy Ma)	2016	—	—	—	—		Non-album singles
"Black Love" (Remix) (Papoose featuring Remy Ma)	2016	—	—	—	—		Non-album singles
"Wait a Minute" (Remix) (Phresher featuring Remy Ma and 50 Cent)	2016	—	—	—	—		Non-album singles
"FAB" (JoJo featuring Remy Ma)	2016	— (Note: "FAB" did not enter the Billboard Hot 100, but peaked at number 28 on the Pop Digital Songs chart.)	—	—	—		Mad Love
"You" (Keyshia Cole featuring Remy Ma and French Montana)	2017	—	— (Note: "You" did not enter the Hot R&B/Hip-Hop Songs chart, but peaked at number eight on the Bubbling Under R&B/Hip-Hop Songs chart.)	—	—		11:11 Reset
"I Don't" (Remix) (Mariah Carey featuring Remy Ma and YG)	2017	—	—	—	—		Non-album singles
"East Coast" (ASAP Ferg featuring Remy Ma)	2017	—	—	—	—		Non-album singles
"CC" (Papoose featuring Remy Ma)	2019	—	—	—	—		Non-album singles
"The Golden Child" (Papoose featuring Remy Ma and Angelica Vila)	2019	—	—	—	—		Non-album singles
"Remy Rap" (DJ Premier featuring Remy Ma and Rapsody)	2022	—	—	—	—		Non-album singles
"Thought I Was Gonna Stop" (Remix) (Papoose featuring Remy Ma, Lil Wayne, 2 Chainz and Busta Rhymes)	2022	—	—	—	—		Non-album singles
"YUPP!" (Ghostface Killah featuring Remy Ma)	2023	—	—	—	—		Non-album singles
"Ghetto & Ratchet" (Remy Ma Remix) (Connie Diiamond featuring Remy Ma)	2023	—	—	—	—		Non-album singles
"Shade Room Pt. 2" (Maino featuring Remy Ma)	2025	—	—	—	—		Non-album singles
"Conceited (What the Fuck)" (Beaumont featuring Remy Ma)	2025	—	—	—	— (Note: "Conceited (What The Fuck)" did not enter the UK Singles Chart but peaked at number twenty eight on the UK Dance Singles chart.)		Non-album singles

== Guest appearances ==
List of non-single album appearances, with other performing artists, showing year released and album name
Title	Year	Other artist(s)	Album
"Ms. Martin"	2000	Big Pun	Yeeeah Baby
"You Was Wrong"	2000	Big Pun, Fat Joe, Drag-On	Yeeeah Baby
"Ante Up" (Remix)	2000	M.O.P., Busta Rhymes, Teflon	The Mix Tape, Vol. IV
"The Tribero"	2000	Big L, Fat Joe, O.C.	The Big Picture
"Cuban Sandwich"	2001	Cuban Link, Lo-Key	24K
"Opposites Attract (What They Like)"	2001	Fat Joe	Jealous Ones Still Envy (J.O.S.E.)
"Definition of a Don"	2001	Fat Joe	Jealous Ones Still Envy (J.O.S.E.)
"He's Not Real"	2001	Fat Joe, Prospect	Jealous Ones Still Envy (J.O.S.E.)
"We Thuggin'" (Remix)	2001	Fat Joe, Busta Rhymes, R. Kelly, Noreaga	Jealous Ones Still Envy (J.O.S.E.)
"Freestyle with Remy Martin"	2001	Big Pun	Endangered Species
"U Feel Me/Options"	2001	Havoc, Fat Joe, Capone, Big Noyd	Violator: The Album, V2.0
"TS Piece"	2002	Fat Joe, Tony Sunshine	Loyalty
"Loyalty"	2002	Fat Joe, Armageddon, Prospect	Loyalty
"Seven Deadly Sins"	2003	Amil, Angie Martinez, Duchess, Lady May, Sonja Blade, Vita	The Streetsweeper, Vol. 1
"Take a Look At My Life"	2003	Fat Joe, A-Bless	The Streetsweeper, Vol. 1
"Grand Hang Out"	2004	Nelly, Fat Joe, Jung Tru	Sweat
"Lean Back" (Remix)	2005	Fat Joe, Ma$e, Eminem, Lil Jon	All or Nothing
"Pussy Got Ya Hooked"	2005	Three 6 Mafia	Most Known Unknown
"The Hardest Out"	2006	DJ Kay Slay, Greg Street Papoose, Hell Rell	The Champions: North Meets South
"One and Only (My Boo)"	2006	DJ Kay Slay, Greg Street, Razah	The Champions: North Meets South
"Can't Stop the Reign"	2006	DJ Kay Slay, Greg Street, Shaquille O'Neal, Papoose, Busta Rhymes	The Champions: North Meets South
"You Don't Really Wanna"	2006	DJ Clue, Fat Joe	The Professional 3
"New York, New York"	2008	Maino, Jae Millz, Papoose, Prinz, Tony Sunshine	The One And Only
"Moment Of Truth"	2008	Cuban Link, Triple Seis	Acknowledge the Takeover, Pt. 2
"What It Do"	2008	Red Café	Paper Touchin
"Tell Me How You Like It"	2009	Raekwon, Icewater	The Babygrande Recordings
"Bad Girls"	2010	DJ Kay Slay, Jacki-O, Hedonis da' Amazon, Ayanna Irish	More Than Just a DJ
"Name Callin' "	2011	Papoose	King Of New York
"You're Not Mine"	2012	Ron Browz	Fly Away
"They Don't Love You No More" (Remix)	2014	DJ Khaled, French Montana	—N/a
"Try Me" (Remix)	2014	Dej Loaf, Ty Dolla Sign	Sell Sole
"Real One" (Remix)	2014	Quilly, Papoose	Quilly 2
"Michael Jackson"	2015	Papoose, Ty Dolla Sign	You Can't Stop Destiny
"Ouh Ouh Baby"	2015	Lee Mazin	No Love Lost
"FAB."	2016	JoJo	Mad Love
"Push It" (Remix)	2016	O.T Genasis, Quavo	Coke N Butter
"Lady Z Strikes Back (Can't Stop You)"	2022	Brandy	Queens soundtrack
"Gone Forever"	2022	Mary J. Blige, DJ Khaled	Good Morning Gorgeous (Deluxe edition)
