= Charlie Rock LD =

Hip-hop artist (died 2023)

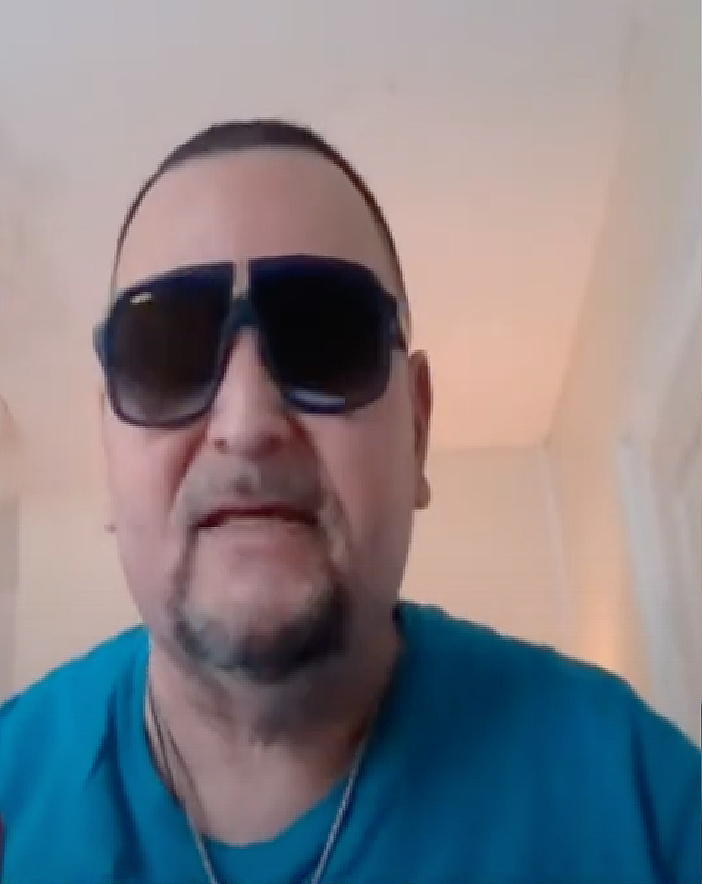
- Charle Rock LD in 2023
- Born: Felix Delgado
- Occupations: Rapper, life coach, youth mentor, podcaster
- Years active: 1998–2023

Felix Delgado, also known as Charlie Rock LD, was known for being a co-founding member of the hip hop collective the Terror Squad. Following his release from prison, he also worked as a life coach, youth mentor and podcaster.

== Life ==
Charlie Rock LD was one of the founding members of the Bronx-based hip hop collective the Terror Squad. Other prominent members included Fat Joe, Big Pun, Cuban Link, Remy Ma, and DJ Khaled. At the age of 18 he was sentenced to ten to twenty years in prison. Charlie Rock LD claimed while in prison he provided protection for rapper Tupac Shakur, and lost an eye defending Fat Joe. Following his release from prison he became a life coach and youth mentor. He also hosted the "Reppin Da Real Podcast.

== Death ==
On May 6, 2023 fellow "Terror Squad" member Cuban Link announced on social media that Charlie Rock LD had died. To date the cause of his death is not known.
