= Jayne Heitmeyer =

Canadian actress

Jayne Heitmeyer is a Canadian actress appearing in many science fiction and horror movies and TV shows.

She is known for playing Lt. Briony Branca in the second season of Night Man, Jessie Jaworski in the 1990s TV series Sirens and Renee Palmer in Gene Roddenberry's Earth: Final Conflict.

Heitmeyer attended the International School of Geneva, John Abbott College in Ste. Anne de Bellevue, Quebec and McGill University in Montreal.

== Filmography ==
=== Film ===
Year	Title	Role	Notes
1992	Coyote	Pam	
1996	Hawk's Vengeance	Lizzie	Direct-to-video film
1996	No Contest II	Bobbi Bell	
1996	Sci-Fighters	Dr. Kirbie Younger	Direct-to-video film
1997	Suspicious Minds	Isabelle Whitmore	
1997	An American Affair	Barbara	
1998	Snake Eyes	Serena, Redhead	
1998	The Lost World	Amanda White	
1998	Out of Control	Marlene	
1998	Dead End	Katie Compton	
1999	Requiem for Murder	Sylvia Tracy	
1999	A Twist of Faith	Beth Smith	
2000	Believe	Meredith Stiles	
2000	Two Thousand and None	Dr. Maeder	
2001	XChange	Proponia	
2004	Jack Paradise (Les nuits de Montréal)	Sinead	
2006	Bon Cop, Bad Cop	Miss Robinson	
2008	South of the Moon	Margaret Hawkins	
2010	Die	Michelle Emmett	
2013	A Fish Story	Jane	
2014	Maps to the Stars	Azita Wachtel	
2018	Appiness	Sierra	Post-production

=== Television ===
Year	Title	Role	Notes
1994–1995	Sirens	Officer Jessie Jaworski	Main role (season 2)
1995	Are You Afraid of the Dark?	Ms. Valenti	Episode: "The Tale of the Mystical Mirror"
1996	The Outer Limits	Barbara	Episode: "First Anniversary"
1996	F/X: The Series	Olivia Barron	"The Brotherhood"
1997	Twists of Terror	Tanya	Television film
1998	The Hunger	Helene Bournouw	Episode: "The Face of Helene Bournouw"
1998–1999	Night Man	Lieutenant Briony Branca	Main role (season 2)
1999	Student Bodies	Ellen Griffin	Episodes: "The Teacher", "The Double Date"
1999	Total Recall 2070	Robin Trower	Episode: "Eye Witness"
1999	P.T. Barnum	Jenny Lind	Television film
1999–2002	Earth: Final Conflict	Renee Palmer	Main role (seasons 3–5)
2000	The Deadly Look of Love	Kathleen Murdock	Television film
2002	Matthew Blackheart: Monster Smasher	Ava	Television film
2002	Adventure Inc.	Sonya Goran	Episode: "Village of the Lost"
2003	Andromeda	Errin Shohashi	Episode: "The Risk-All Point"
2003	Nightlight	Tasha Kingsley	Television film
2003	Street Time	Vivian Beddoes	Episodes: "Get Up, Stand Up", "Gone"
2005	Snakeman	Dr. Susan Elters	Television film
2005	A Killer Upstairs	Vivian Jamison	Television film
2006	Canadian Case Files	Tina Marlatt	
2006	Voodoo Moon	Lola	Television film
2006	Bethune	Mrs. Wentley	Television miniseries
2007	Durham County	Claire Bissett	Episodes: "Guys and Dolls", "Dark Man"
2007	Moose TV	Justine	Episode: "Surviving Moose"
2007	Black Swarm	Katherine Randell	Television film
2010–2011	Degrassi: The Next Generation	Toni Stark	Episodes: "Purple Pills: Part 2, "Chasing Pavements: Part 1"
2011	Jack of Diamonds	Candice Faber	Television film
2011	Republic of Doyle	Jean Francis	Episode: "Don't Gamble with City Hall"
2013	Still Life: A Three Pines Mystery	Yolande Fontaine	Television film
2013	House of Versace	Lauren	Television film
2014–2015	19-2	Marie	Recurring role
2015	The Fixer	Jane	Television miniseries
2016	Real Detective	Rachel Howard	Episode: "Misery"
2016	Quantico	Wendy Miller	Episode: "Answer"
2018	Separated at Birth	Kolbie Gray	Television film
