= Sci-Fighters =

- Directed by: Peter Svatek
- Written by: Mark Sevi
- Starring: Roddy Piper; Jayne Heitmeyer; Billy Drago; Tyrone Benskin; Richard Raybourne
- Production company: Shostak/Rossner Productions
- Distributed by: CineTel Films
- Release date: 30 December 1996 (U.S.)
- Running time: 94 minutes
- Countries: Canada; United States
- Language: English

Sci-Fighters is a 1996 science fiction action film directed by Peter Svatek and starring Roddy Piper, Billy Drago and Jayne Heitmeyer.

== Plot summary ==
The film takes place in the city of Boston, in the year 2009. Detective Cameron Grayson (Roddy Piper) is on the trail of Adrian Dunn (Billy Drago), his ex-partner and his wife's murderer. Dunn has escaped from prison on the Moon and returned to Earth with a deadly alien virus. Grayson must hurry to stop Dunn before the virus Dunn is carrying spreads all over the planet.

== Cast ==
- Roddy Piper as Detective Cameron Grayson
- Billy Drago as Adrian Dunn
- Jayne Heitmeyer as Dr. Kirbie Younger
- Tyrone Benskin as Dr. Gene Washington
- Chip Chuipka as Captain Lankett
- Jesse Evans as Ned Raver
- Richard Raybourne as Casper
- Andy Bradshaw as G.T.
- Richard Zeman as Desine
- Alain Gabriel as Rollo
- Philip Pretten as Dr. Underwood
- Johni Keyworth as The Mayor
- Donna Sarrasin as Tricia Rollins
- Karen Elkin as Zombie Woman
- Danielle Desormeaux as Female Officer
- Doris Milmore as Hooker
