= 11:11 Reset =

Studio album by Keyshia Cole
- Released: October 20, 2017
- Recorded: 2015–2016; April–August 2017
- Genre: R&B
- Labels: Epic; Sony
- Producers: Keyshia Cole (also exec.); Aaron Rogers; Amadeus; BigHeadDez; BongoByTheWay; Chink Santana; Damon Thomas; Danja; Danny "Ezra" Murdock; DJ Mustard; Drumma Boy; Eric Dawkins; Eric Hudson; H-Money; JV; Orlando Williams; Patrick “GuitarBoy” Hayes; Rashad Johnson; Track King Cole; Triple A; Yonni

Keyshia Cole chronology
Point of No Return (2014)	11:11 Reset (2017)

Singles from 11:11 Reset
- 1. "You" Released: January 27, 2017; 2. "Incapable" Released: August 25, 2017

11:11 Reset is the seventh studio album by American singer Keyshia Cole. It was released by Epic Records on October 20, 2017. It succeeds Cole's sixth album Point of No Return (2014). The album was preceded by the release of two singles—"You" and "Incapable". 11:11 Reset peaked at number 37 on the US Billboard 200.

== Background ==
In February 2015, Cole revealed to Rap-Up TV that she was contractually free from Interscope and was intending on moving forward as an independent recording artist. Cole also confirmed work on her seventh studio album, revealing that she was halfway done with ten tracks so far. She stated: "I don't know which direction I wanna go in. I don't know if I want it to be more fun, I don't know if I want it to be more heartfelt or if I want it upbeat, medium to slow. I'm just recording and recording and recording and recording and recording and recording and recording." In December 2016, it was announced that Cole signed a new record deal with Sony's Epic Records.

In December 2016, it was announced that Cole signed a new record deal with Epic Records. In an interview with Rap-Up magazine, she announced the name of her upcoming album titled 11:11 Reset stating:

"For the past year, I’ve been seeing 11:11 constantly and to my understanding, you’re aligned spiritually with your destiny and everything that is meant to be in your life is happening at the right time. The timing is right. Everything is right. The Writings On The Wall. Reset is definitely cohesive with that.".

== Singles ==
"You" featuring Remy Ma and French Montana was released as the album's lead single on January 27, 2017. The music video premiered on February 27, 2017.

"Incapable" was released as the album's second single on August 25, 2017. The music video was released on October 6, 2017.

In February 2018, Keyshia announced via Instagram that the third single will be a brand new song because she is re-releasing the album just in time for the RESET world tour.

== Critical reception ==
Professional ratings
Review scores
Source	Rating
AllMusic	3.5/5 stars

Allmusic editor Andy Kellman found that 11:11 Reset "handily tops her 2014 set with comparatively nuanced and richer songs." He continued on to say that "They ultimately beget a fluidity the first six full-lengths lack. As ever, Cole's love life is marked by volatility and unfaithfulness [...] Cole shuns the cheater, cuts ties, consoles and assures herself, and lays out her expectations for settling down – all familiar ground for the artist. She nonetheless finds new ways to cover most of it, and does so with a level of restraint that makes her maximum-effort moments all the more powerful."

== Commercial performance ==
On November 11, 2017, the album debuted at number 37 on the Billboard 200, with first-week sales of 13,377 units (9,420 in pure album sales) in the United States. The album also peaked at number six on the US Top R&B/Hip-Hop Albums and number three on the Top R&B Albums. In the United Kingdom, the album peaked at number 36 on the UK R&B Albums charts.

== Track listing ==
11:11 Reset
No.	Title	Writer(s)	Producer(s)	Length
1.	"Cole World" (Intro) (featuring DJ Khaled)	Keyshia Cole; Khaled Khaled; Andre Atkins; Andre Parker; Jerline Shelton; Maurice Commander	Chink Santana; Triple A	1:24
2.	"Unbothered"	Cole; Eric Hudson; Danny "Ezra" Murdock; Denisia Andrews; Brittany Coney; Nazir Assad	Hudson; Murdock; Track King Cole	2:25
3.	"You" (featuring Remy Ma and French Montana)	Cole; Reminisce Mackie; Karim Kharbouch; Harmony Samuels; Edgar Etienne; Gary Kemp; Theron Thomas; Timothy Thomas; Attrell Cordes	H-Money; JV	3:53
4.	"Incapable"	Cole; Nathaniel Hills; Marcella Araica; Elijah Blake; Gabrielle Nowee; Patrick “GuitarBoy” Hayes	Danja; Hayes^{[A]}	3:24
5.	"Best Friend"	Cole; Antwan Thompson; Aaron Rogers; Rashad Johnson; Gavyn Rhone	Amadeus; Rogers; Johnson	3:42
6.	"Vault"	Cole; Jeremy Felton; Uforo Ebong; Raymond Komba	BongoByTheWay	4:11
7.	"Act Right" (featuring Young Thug)	Cole; Blake; Jeffery Williams; Kevin Randolph; John "JAYLIEN" Wesley	DJ Mustard	3:33
8.	"Right Time"	Cole; Desmond J. Peterson; Blake; Ronald M. Ferebee, Jr.; Sam Hook	BigHeadDez; Yonni	3:37
9.	"Emotional"	Cole; Damon Thomas; Eric Dawkins; Orlando Williamson	Thomas; Dawkins; Williamson	4:51
10.	"Ride" (featuring Kamaiyah)	Cole; Bruce Washington; Joseph Paquette; Yaki Kadafi; Katari Cox; Michael Ray Stevenson; Rufus Cooper; Tupac Shakur; Tyrone Wrice, Jr.	Drumma Boy	3:14
11.	"Cole World (Outro)" (featuring Too $hort)	Cole; Todd Shaw; Atkins; Parker; Shelton; Commander	Santana; Triple A	1:24

Notes

- ^{^[A]} denotes co-producer

== Charts ==
Chart (2017)	Peak position
UK R&B Albums (OCC)	36
US Billboard 200	37
US Top R&B/Hip-Hop Albums (Billboard)	20

== Release history ==
Country	Date	Format	Label	Ref.
United States	October 20, 2017	Digital download; CD	Epic; Sony; Hearts and Stars Production Inc.	
United Kingdom	October 20, 2017	Digital download; CD	Epic; Sony; Hearts and Stars Production Inc.	
