= Conceited (There's Something About Remy) =

Single by Remy Ma

from the album There's Something About Remy: Based on a True Story
- Released: December 13, 2005
- Recorded: 2005
- Genre: Hip-hop; snap
- Length: 3:39
- Label: SRC; Universal
- Songwriters: Reminisce Mackie; Scott Storch
- Producer: Scott Storch

Remy Ma singles chronology
"Whuteva" (2005)	"Conceited (There's Something About Remy)" (2005)	"Feel So Good" (2006)

Music video
- "Conceited (There's Something About Remy)" on YouTube

"Conceited (There's Something About Remy)", simply known as "Conceited", is the second single from American rapper Remy Ma's debut solo studio album There's Something About Remy: Based on a True Story. Produced by Scott Storch, the song contains a sample of "I'm Too Sexy" by Right Said Fred.

The song was also featured in the 2011 documentary, Black Lifestyle in Japan, where she was praised for having a "stylish" look and recognized as one of the most frequently listened to hip-hop musicians in Japan.

Remy Ma also sampled "Conceited" in her 2014 song "Wassup Tho" produced by LV and Sean C.

== Background ==
"Conceited" was written by Scott Storch and Remy Ma, credited as Scott Storch and Remeinise Mackie respectively. The song contains samples of "I'm Too Sexy" by Right Said Fred and "Dip It Low" by Christina Milian. The writers of these two songs, Fred Fairbass, Richard Fairbrass, Rob Manzoli, Poli Paul, Teedra Moses, and John Jackson, receive songwriting credits for "Conceited" as a result.

== Chart performance ==
Conceited peaked at number 71 on the Billboard Radio Songs chart, number 17 on the Billboard Hot Rap Songs chart, number 24 on the Billboard R&B/Hip-Hop Airplay chart, number 7 on the Billboard Hot R&B/Hip-Hop Songs Recurrents chart and number 4 on the Billboard Bubbling Under R&B/Hip-Hop Songs chart.

== Music video ==
The music video premiered on January 7, 2006 on VH1 and was directed by Scott Franklin. The video opens with Smith laying on her mattress in her penthouse, being fanned and assisted by shirtless men and women. Later, she walks upstairs into her closet getting dressed for an event. Fellow Terror Squad member Fat Joe makes a cameo in the video.

== Track listings and formats ==
12-inch single

1. "Conceited (There's Something About Remy)" (Clean) — 3:41
2. "Conceited (There's Something About Remy)" (Instrumental) — 3:41
3. "Conceited (There's Something About Remy)" (Dirty) — 3:41
4. "Conceited (There's Something About Remy)" (Acappella) — 3:24

US 12" vinyl

1. "Conceited (There's Something About Remy)" (Clean) — 3:41
2. "Conceited (There's Something About Remy)" (Instrumental) — 3:41
3. "Conceited (There's Something About Remy)" (Dirty) — 3:41
4. "Conceited (There's Something About Remy)" (Acappella) — 3:24

12-inch promo single

1. "Conceited (There's Something About Remy)" (Clean) — 3:41
2. "Conceited (There's Something About Remy)" (Instrumental) — 3:41
3. "Conceited (There's Something About Remy)" (Dirty) — 3:41
4. "Conceited (There's Something About Remy)" (Acappella) — 3:24

CD single

1. "Conceited (There's Something About Remy)" (Clean) — 3:41
2. "Conceited (There's Something About Remy)" (Dirty) — 3:41
3. "Conceited (There's Something About Remy)" (Instrumental) — 3:41

== Charts ==
=== Weekly charts ===
Chart (2005–2006)	Peak position
US Billboard Hot 100	90
US Hot R&B/Hip-Hop Songs (Billboard)	25
US Hot Rap Songs (Billboard)	17

=== Year-end charts ===
Chart (2006)	Position
US Hot R&B/Hip-Hop Songs (Billboard)	92

== Certifications ==
Region	Certification	Certified units/sales
New Zealand (RMNZ)	Gold	15,000^{‡}
^{‡} Sales+streaming figures based on certification alone.
