= An American Affair (1997 film) =

- DVD cover
- Directed by: Sebastian Shah
- Written by: Judd Laurance; Arshad Shah
- Produced by: Arshad Shah
- Starring: Corbin Bernsen; Jayne Heitmeyer; Maryam d'Abo; Robert Vaughn; Thomas G. Waites
- Cinematography: Perci Young
- Music by: Peter Measroch
- Distributed by: TSC; York Entertainment
- Release date: 1997
- Running time: 92 minutes
- Country: Canada
- Language: English

An American Affair is a 1997 Canadian thriller film directed by Sebastian Shah and written by Judd Laurence and Arshad Shah. It stars Corbin Bernsen, Jayne Heitmeyer, Maryam d'Abo and Robert Vaughn.

== Plot ==
Sam Brady is a politically ambitious district attorney who has a rivalry with a federal senator and frames his son as drug dealer. He falls in love with two women – Barbara and Genevieve – who are close friends with each other. Genevieve becomes pregnant after having sex with him and he secretly marries her; shortly after she loses the baby. Being caught by Genevieve in the act of having sex with Barbara, he accidentally kills his wife in the ensuing argument, and buries, with Barbara's assistance, Genevieve's body at a downtown construction site. In the end, it turns out Genevieve is still alive and was conspiring with Barbara and the senator.

== Cast ==
- Corbin Bernsen as Sam Brady/John Crawford
- Robert Vaughn as Professor Michaels
- Maryam d'Abo as Genevieve
- Jayne Heitmeyer as Barbara
- Thomas G. Waites as Mulroney
- Rob Stewart as Dave Norton
- Pierre Lenoir as Spaulding
