= Take Me Home (Terror Squad song) =

Single by Terror Squad

from the album True Story
- B-side: "Let Them Things Go"
- Released: September 28, 2004
- Studio: The Record Room (Miami, FL)
- Genre: Hip-hop
- Label: Terror Squad; SRC; Universal
- Songwriters: Joseph Cartagena; Reminisce Smith; John Eaddy; Andre Lyon; Nicholas Warwar; Marcello Valenzano; Brenda Russell
- Producers: StreetRunner; Cool & Dre

Terror Squad singles chronology
"Lean Back" (2004)	"Take Me Home" (2004)

Music video
- "Take Me Home" on YouTube

"Take Me Home" is a hip-hop song performed by Terror Squad members Fat Joe, Remy Ma and Armageddon featuring vocals from Dre. It was released on September 28, 2004 through Street Records Corporation and Universal Records as the second and final single from the group's second studio album True Story. Recording sessions took place at the Record Room in Miami. Production was handled by StreetRunner and Cool & Dre, who utilized excerpts from Roberta Flack and Peabo Bryson cover version of Brenda Russell's "If Only for One Night". The single peaked at number 62 on the Billboard Hot 100, number 22 on the Hot R&B/Hip-Hop Songs and number 19 on the Hot Rap Songs charts in the United States.

== Music video ==
Jessy Terrero and Raul Conde directed the music video for "Take Me Home" over the course of two days. Portions of the video were filmed at a $15 million mansion in Hollywood Hills, Los Angeles, and other scenes were filmed on Crenshaw Boulevard.

== Track listings ==
Promo CD single
No.	Title	Writer(s)	Producer(s)	Length
1.	"Take Me Home" (clean)	Reminisce Smith; John Eaddy; Andre Lyon; Joseph Cartagena; Nicholas Warwar; Marcello Valenzano; Brenda Russell	Streetrunner; Cool & Dre
2.	"Take Me Home" (explicit)	Smith; Eaddy; Lyon; Cartagena; Warwar; Valenzano; Russell	Streetrunner; Cool & Dre

12" single
No.	Title	Producer(s)	Length
1.	"Take Me Home" (clean)	Cool & Dre; Streetrunner
2.	"Take Me Home" (main)	Cool & Dre; Streetrunner
3.	"Take Me Home" (instrumental)	Cool & Dre; Streetrunner
4.	"Take Me Home" (clean acappella)	Cool & Dre; Streetrunner
5.	"Let Them Things Go" (clean)	Cool & Dre
6.	"Let Them Things Go" (main)	Cool & Dre
7.	"Let Them Things Go" (instrumental)	Cool & Dre

Sample credits

- Track 1 contains excerpts from the composition "If Only for One Night" written by Brenda Russell as performed by Roberta Flack and Peabo Bryson.

== Personnel ==
- Joseph "Fat Joe" Cartagena – vocals
- Reminisce "Remy Ma" Smith – vocals
- John "Armageddon" Eaddy – vocals
- Andre "Dre" Lyon – vocals, keyboards, producer
- Marcello "Cool" Valenzano – keyboards, producer
- Nicholas "STREETRUNNER" Warwar – producer, programming
- Dave Cabrera – guitar, bass
- Christian "Sound Boy" Delatour – recording
- Robert "Big Briz" Brisbane – recording
- Ken "Duro" Ifill – mixing

== Charts ==
Chart (2004)	Peak position
US Billboard Hot 100	62
US Hot R&B/Hip-Hop Songs (Billboard)	22
US Hot Rap Songs (Billboard)	19
