= 6:45 =

2021 film directed by Craig Singer

- Directed by: Craig Singer
- Written by: Robert Dean Klein
- Cinematography: Lucas Pitassi
- Edited by: Sam Adelman
- Music by: Kostas Christides
- Production company: Birds Fly Dogs Bark Wind Blows Productions
- Distributed by: Well Go USA
- Release date: August 6, 2021
- Running time: 96 minutes
- Country: United States
- Language: English

6:45 is a 2021 horror film that was directed by Craig Singer. The film had a limited theatrical release, followed by a release to VOD in 2022.

== Synopsis ==
Bobby has traveled via ferry to a small bed and breakfast for a romantic vacation with his girlfriend Jules. Expecting to reconnect with Jules, Bobby instead finds that he's trapped in a loop where he and Jules repeat the same day. Each day ends with the pair getting murdered by a hooded figure. Attempts to leave the island or avoid death are unsuccessful, as he is unable to avoid death. He cannot leave the island due to the town shutting down the ferry in memorial of a couple who was mysteriously murdered. Assuming that the loop is related to the prior murders, Bobby digs for information from the bed and breakfast owner who cryptically tells him to do the right thing.

Flashbacks show that the relationship between Bobby and Jules is strained, as he is suspected of being unfaithful. Their relationship is further strained by his growing agitation from the loops, which results in him picking fights with the townspeople. On one loop Bobby goes to drink at the local bar, where he confesses to the bartender that he cheated on Jules with one of her friends. He got the woman pregnant and pushed for her to get an abortion. The bartender tells Bobby that he must tell Jules the truth. When Jules arrives the two instead have a terrible fight and the night ends with the hooded figure murdering them.

The following day Bobby decides to tell Jules the truth about the affair and abortion, also confessing to another affair prior to that. This results in another fight but successfully breaks the time loop, as Bobby wakes to find Jules gone. He returns home by himself, where he is arrested for murdering Jules. It is revealed that Bobby murdered Jules because she wanted to leave him and that this occurred prior to the trip. Bobby is imprisoned and given mental help, where he reads a letter Jules wrote about leaving him. He eventually confesses to killing her, but still insists that the events from the time loop occurred.

== Cast ==
- Michael Reed as Bobby Patterson
- Augie Duke as Jules Rable
- Thomas G. Waites as Larry
- Armen Garo as Gene Pratt
- Remy Ma as Cassi
- Sasha K. Gordon as Brooklyn / Rose
- Sabina Friedman-Seitz as Shelly / Ashley
- The 45 King

== Production ==
Singer drew inspiration for the movie from the 1993 comedy Groundhog Day. He wrote the initial story and some of the scenes, while Klein wrote the majority of the script. The film lacked the funding for a casting director, so Singer reached out to people that he had met or worked with previously for the cast and crew. Filming was conducted in script order and took place in Ocean Grove, New Jersey.

== Release ==
6:45 was given a limited theatrical release on August 6, 2021 through Regal Cinemas, followed by a release to home video and VOD on March 22, 2022 through Well Go USA.

== Reception ==
Critical reception for the film has been mixed and the movie holds a rating of 67% on Rotten Tomatoes, based on 12 reviews. Common criticism centered upon the film's pacing and the likeability of the characters. Roger Moore and Culture Crypt both compared the film to Groundhog Day, with Moore noting that "I found this more “interesting” as a problem-solving exercise than entertaining, more “watchable” than “good.”". Film Threat and Rue Morgue were more favorable in their reviews. Film Threat commented that the movie "will frustrate just about everyone who watches it for its first hour or so" but that "thanks to the pacing, cinematography, and especially the cast, the film offers up more than enough value to be an entertaining ride for 90-minutes.

The film has been nominated or won the following awards: "Best Horror Feature" at Flicker's Rhode Island Film Festival (Academy Award Qualifying), "Best Feature Film" 2022 ARFF Amsterdam// International Awards, "Winner" at Paris Independent Film Festival, "Best Feature Film" at Hollywood on the Tiber Film Awards, "Best Indie Feature Film" at Florence Film Awards, "Best American Director" At 8 & Hal Film Awards, "Best Director Feature Film" at Hollywood International Golden Age Festival, "Best Director" at 4th Dimension Bali Film Festival, "Best Director Feature Film" at New York Movie Awards, "Best Director in U.S Feature" at Catalina Film Festival, "Best Actor in a U.S Feature" at Catalina Film Festival, "Honorable Mention" at London Movie Awards, "Honorable Mention: Feature Film" at New York Movie Awards, "Official Selection" at MA Film Festival, "Official Selection" at Catalina Film Festival, "Official Selection" at Salem Horror Fest, "Official Selection" at Festival of Cinema NYC, "Official Selection" at London Movie Awards, "Official Selection" at Milan Gold Awards, "Official Selection" at HorrOrigins Film Festival, "Official Selection" at Atlanta Horror Film Festival".
