= You (Keyshia Cole song) =

Single by Keyshia Cole featuring Remy Ma and French Montana

from the album 11:11 Reset
- Released: January 27, 2017
- Recorded: 2016
- Genre: R&B; hip hop
- Length: 3:52
- Label: Epic; Sony
- Songwriters: Keyshia Cole; Reminisce Mackie; Karim Kharbouch; Harmony Samuels
- Producer: Harmony Samuels

Keyshia Cole singles chronology
"She" (2014)	"You" (2017)	"Incapable" (2017)

Remy Ma singles chronology
"Money Showers" (2016)	"You" (2017)	"East Coast" (2017)

French Montana singles chronology
"Paid For" (2016)	"You" (2017)	"No Pressure" (2017)

"You" is a song recorded by American R&B singer Keyshia Cole featuring American rappers Remy Ma and French Montana. The song is also produced by Harmony Samuels. It was released on January 27, 2017, as the first single from her seventh studio album, 11:11 Reset (2017), through Epic Records. The song serves as her debut with Epic Records and Sony Music Entertainment.

== Critical reception ==
The song was met with positive reviews from critics. Rap-Up stated "KC is back. As she gears up for her upcoming album, Keyshia Cole taps French Montana and Remy Ma for the lead single "You", which addresses bitter breakups with anthemic empowerment and no-holds-barred bashing. Riding with Keyshia is her longtime pal Remy, who provides her own take on the concept. French Montana follows the ladies with a verse of his own, also admonishing an ex. Later, he even adds a political reference. “Your game week like seven nights / Coming with them same lines like Trump wife.”" Lakin Starling from The Fader magazine gave a positive review calling the song a "liberating anthem" also stating the song as a "perfect for the moment when you've reached a turning point in a relationship and decide that you deserve better. Cole laces the track with passionate, candied vocals and addresses her ex-lover straight on: "You picked the wrong one," she declares without hesitation."

Gail Mitchell from Billboard magazine gave a rave review of the song "Keyshia Cole is officially back. A month after Instagramming her signing of a long-term contract with Epic Records, the Grammy Award-nominated singer-songwriter is now promoting her first single with the label.The mid-tempo "You" finds a determined Cole declaring, "You just played me for the last time / I'm done [fucking] with you / You picked the wrong one, baby." It's not a far leap to think perhaps that Cole is referencing past issues with her former husband Daniel Gibson. But "You" is just one of several semi-biographical tracks that the artist recently let Billboard listen to in a Hollywood studio as she completes recording of her yet-untitled seventh album."

== Music video ==
Two days after the release of the single, Cole posted a picture on her Instagram of her and Remy Ma on set of the "You" music video. The official music video for You premiered on February 27, 2017, directed by Benny Boom.

=== Synopsis ===
The video begins as the camera pans up to the house where Keyshia is having a conversation with the two police officers. The officers stated that her boyfriend hasn't been home all day, she and him are confronting recently and that he was cheating on her with another girl. Cole denies all the answers and the officers ask her to wait another day to figure it out. She stands up and leaves the room. As the song begins, words flash up on the screen and in reality, it seems that Cole has gagged her boyfriend (played by Tyler Lepley) who's hidden inside the closet. She then proceeds to get rid of her beau by cutting up a piece of the birthday cake and slapping it in his face, putting makeup on his forehead and throwing him in the pool. During Remy Ma's verse, she is wearing all black leather as she teases him and messes around with her tools. After the second chorus, French Montana puts the boyfriend and his new girlfriend in the trunk of a car while scenes of him and his ex-girlfriend in palm trees at night are shown in-between. Towards the end, Montana drops the boyfriend and girlfriend off in the middle of nowhere as he drives off. Scenes of Cole, Ma, and Montana singing at a house are interspersed as well as Cole dancing on the stairs in one room and with her female dancers in another.

== Live performances ==
Cole performed "You" live for the first time on Jimmy Kimmel Live! on January 31, 2017. Dressed in an all white ensemble with dramatic ruffles, Cole performed a clean version of the song while accompanied by four female backup dancers. She performed the song on The Real on February 7, 2017. Cole performed the song at the Celebrity Theater on September 15, 2018.

== Track listing ==
Explicit digital download
No.	Title	Length
1.	"You" (featuring Remy Ma & French Montana)	3:52

Clean digital download
No.	Title	Length
1.	"You" (featuring Remy Ma & French Montana)	3:52

== Charts ==
Chart performance for "You"
Chart (2017)	Peak position
US Bubbling Under R&B/Hip-Hop Singles (Billboard)	8
US Hot R&B Songs (Billboard)	19

== Release history ==
Region	Date	Format	Version	Label	Ref
United States	January 27, 2017	Digital download	Clean; Explicit	Epic; Sony	
United Kingdom	January 27, 2017	Digital download	Explicit	Epic; Sony	
