= Malcolm Braly =

American novelist (1925–1980)

- Born: 25 July 1925; Portland, Oregon
- Died: 7 April 1980 (aged 54); Baltimore, Maryland
- Occupation: Novelist
- Writing career
- Period: 1960–1979
- Subjects: prison, incarceration
- Notable work: On the Yard (1967)

Malcolm Braly (July 25, 1925 – April 7, 1980) was an American author born in Portland, Oregon. He spent much of his life in and out of various prisons, including Folsom Prison and San Quentin, before earning recognition as an author after his final release from prison in 1965.

His most acclaimed novel, On the Yard, was first published in 1967, and adapted to film in 1978. His other books include Felony Tank (1961); Shake Him Till He Rattles (1963); It's Cold Out There (1966); his memoir, False Starts: A Memoir of San Quentin and Other Prisons (1976); and his final novel, The Protector (1979).

Braly died of injuries sustained from a traffic accident in Baltimore, Maryland, at 54.

On the Yard was republished by New York Review Books in 2002. His other books have been reissued by Stark House Press.

== Reception ==
Jonathan Lethem has praised On the Yard as one of the best American prison novels.
