= Thomas G. Waites =

American actor (born 1955)

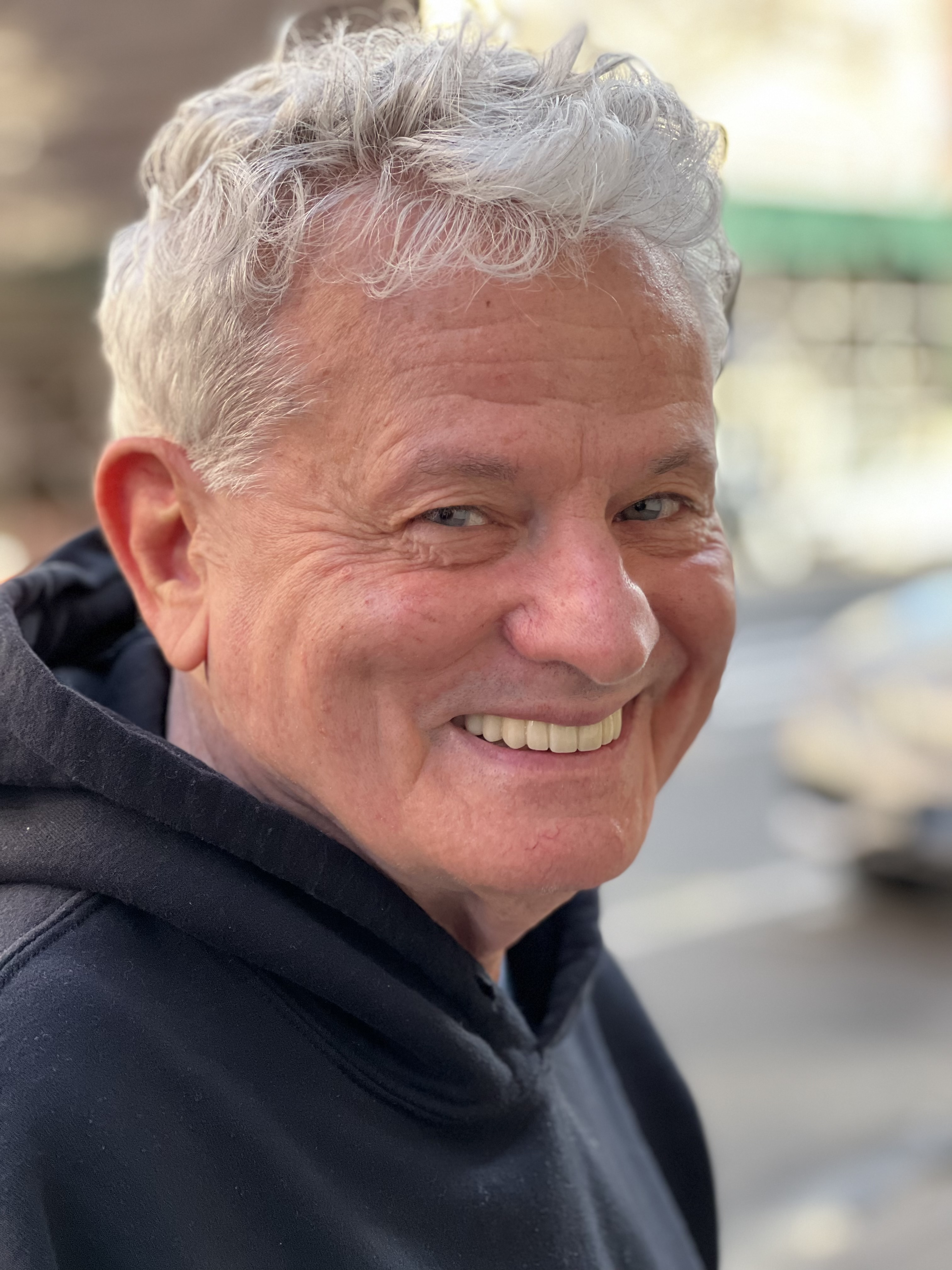
- Born: January 8, 1955 (age 71); Philadelphia, Pennsylvania, U.S.
- Education: Juilliard School; New School (BA); University of Iowa (MFA)
- Occupations: Actor, director, acting teacher
- Years active: 1976–present
- Spouse: Lisa Greenberg (m. 1987; div. 1999)
- Children: 2
- Website: www.thomasgwaites.com

Thomas G. Waites (born January 8, 1955) is an American actor and acting instructor born in Philadelphia, Pennsylvania. Waites runs an eponymous acting studio in New York City. He has been a member of the Actors Studio since 1984.

== Early life and education ==
Waites was born in Philadelphia, Pennsylvania, the son of Michael and Anne Waites. He completed grade school at Immaculate Conception in Levittown, Pennsylvania and then high school at Bishop Egan in Fairless Hills, Pennsylvania. After one year at Bucks County Community College, he received a full scholarship for acting at the Juilliard School in New York City, where he studied as a member of the Drama Division's Group 7 (1974–1977). He received a B.A. degree in Writing from The New School and a Master of Fine Arts in Playwriting from the University of Iowa.

== Career ==
When Waites was 21 years old, he was offered two movies simultaneously: Snowbound, directed by Robert Young, and Pity the Poor Soldier (the title has subsequently changed), directed by Bill Jersey. Despite the fact that he was offered twice the money for Snowbound, Waites chose Pity the Poor Soldier because it was in celebration of the bicentennial of the American Revolutionary War. Next Waites originated the role of Oliver Treefe in Simon Gray's world premiere of Molly at the First Annual Spoleto Festival in Charleston, S.C. After this highly acclaimed performance, he returned to NYC to be cast in the Joan Micklin Silver-produced On the Yard (1978), co-starring John Heard. Subsequently, he was offered a three-picture option deal with Paramount Pictures. After very strong critical notices, Waites auditioned for and got a part in Walter Hill's The Warriors (1979), playing the character Fox. After disputes with the director, he was fired from this film. Subsequently, when the studio asked him where he wanted his billing, he told them to remove his name completely, a decision Waites regrets. He has since reconciled with Walter Hill. Three weeks after being fired from The Warriors, Tom auditioned with Al Pacino and was cast as Jeff McCullough in the Norman Jewison film ...And Justice for All (1979). This began a long relationship with Pacino. The two worked together again in Shakespeare's Richard III, with Waites playing Richmond, where he received strong notices again. After that, Waites originated the role of Mitchell in Alan Bowne's Forty-Deuce Off-Broadway at the Perry Street Theatre. In 1982, Waites competed with Matt Dillon and Kevin Bacon to land the role of Bobby in David Mamet's play American Buffalo. Kurt Russell and John Carpenter saw his performance and cast him as Windows in the 1982 film The Thing. Waites was cast in the Broadway premiere of Trafford Tanzi, a musical in which he sang with Deborah Harry of Blondie fame. Next was Pastorale, the Obie Award-winning play by Debra Eisenberg starring Judith Ivey and Christine Estabrook, with Waites playing the character of Steve.

It was during this time that Tom met his namesake and singer, Tom Waits, who generously taught Tom the song "Jersey Girl" on the guitar. Out of deference to the musician Tom Waits, this is when Tom added the "G." to his professional name to offset any confusion between the two talented artists. Tom Waits even played the bass drum on a demo tape of Thomas G. Waites' music. Tom G. Waites began writing music and formed a band called The Pushups, playing gigs around NYC in clubs such as CBGB's, Limelight, Traxs, The Bitter End, and even opening for The Smithereens.

In 1983, Waits joined The Mirror Theater Ltd’s Mirror Repertory Company, performing in numerous repertory productions off-Broadway at St. Peter's Church throughout various seasons. His work with The Mirror included one of the highlights of Tom's career: working with Geraldine Page in Clifford Odets' Paradise Lost in the role of Kewpie, originated by Elia Kazan.

The reviews from this show and a recommendation by Al Pacino got Tom the part of Ralph in Clifford Odets' Awake and Sing! and Sing on Broadway with actress Frances McDormand and actor Harry Hamlin. Tom was then cast in the role of Broud in The Clan of the Cave Bear (1986) with Daryl Hannah and James Remar. Terrible critical notices and a cold reception from the public combined to make Clan of the Cave Bear a less-than-career-building move. It was at this point that he met his future wife, Lisa Greenberg, with whom he has two children: Samuel Jackson Waites and Michaela Kate Waites. Tom next played Otis Price, the babystealer in ABC's All My Children for approximately 9 months, while performing Israel Horovitz's North Shore Fish at the WPA Theater in NYC alongside John Pankow, Christine Estabrook, Wendie Malick, and Laura San Giacomo. Tom also made guest appearances in such popular television shows as Kojak (with Telly Savalas), Miami Vice, and two episodes of The Equalizer. Tom played the role of Rob in Howard Korder's Search and Destroy on Broadway alongside Griffin Dunne. Tom appeared as Smittie in the film Light of Day (1987), opposite Michael J. Fox and Joan Jett, and was then cast as Al Capone, competing with actors like Harvey Keitel for the film Gangland (1987) with Scott Glenn.

Waites moved to Iowa City, Iowa, to pursue a career as a playwright. While in Iowa, Tom wrote a play called Dark Laughter, based on the lives of William Faulkner and Dylan Thomas. The play was picked up by producer Barry Kemp, creator of the hit television series Coach. The play was moved to the Marin Theatre Center in Mill Valley, California.

Waites next relocated to Los Angeles, where he started the theater company, TomCats. This is where he began his directing career. After two guest star appearances on NYPD Blue and some minor roles in small independent films and television shows, including a guest star in Buffy the Vampire Slayer, Mike Hammer, Private Eye with Stacy Keach, and Sliders. At this time, Waites established himself as a top acting teacher, which led to the opening of the TGW Acting Studio in 2000, which continues to thrive today.

Upon returning to New York, Waites landed guest roles in Law & Order (four times) and Law & Order: Criminal Intent (two times) and starred in the soap opera One Life to Live as Decker Denton. Waites played Henry Stanton in Oz for four seasons.

Waites has coached such actors as Alfred Molina, Vinnie Pastore, Vinessa Shaw, Tim Guinee, Oliver Hudson, and Jamie Harris. TGW Acting Studio was named the top school to study acting in New York City by Backstage in 2015.

Further pursuing his love for directing, Waites directed the Off-Broadway hit Six Goumbas and a Wannabe, starring Annie McGovern and Kathrine Narducci. He also directed Golden Ladder (with Amy Redford) and numerous other off-Broadway productions. Waites directed Joe Mantegna and Frances Fisher in a short film, Pandora's Box, for which he won Best Director at the Atlantic City Film Festival.

A prolific director, Waites most recently directed the play A White Man's Guide to Rikers Island, which had a successful run in New York City in 2022. His latest project, a feature film titled Target, was both written and directed by Waites and premiered in April 2023.

== Filmography ==
=== Film ===
Year	Title	Role	Notes
1976	The Other Side of Victory	Joel	TV movie
1978	On the Yard	'Chilly'	Credited as Thomas Waites
1979	The Warriors	'Fox'	Uncredited
1979	...And Justice for All	Jeff McCullaugh	Credited as Thomas Waites
1982	The Thing	Windows	Credited as Thomas Waites
1983	O’Malley	Paul	TV movie
1983	The Face of Rage	Howard	TV movie
1986	The Clan of the Cave Bear	Broud	
1987	Light of Day	'Smittie'	
1987	Gangland	Al Capone	
1988	Shakedown	Officer Kelly	
1990	Kojak: Flowers for Matty	'Tink'	TV movie
1990	State of Grace	Frankie's Man	
1991	McBain	Gill	Credited as T.G. Waites
1993	Midnight Confession	Werewolf	Short
1995	Money Train	Barricade Captain	
1996	Timelock	Warden Andrews	
1997	Most Wanted	Sergeant	
1997	An American Affair	Mulroney	
1997	A Thousand Men and a Baby	Supply Sergeant	TV movie
1999	American Virgin	'Grip'	
1999	Rites of Passage	John Willio	
2001	Nailed	Carpet Guy	
2005	The Exonerated	Deputy	TV movie
2008	The Look	Irv Moulton	Short
2010	An Affirmative Act	Sam 'Dixie' Backus	
2011	The Grand Theft	Randy Lemar	
2011	The Great Fight	Chief Bocchino	
2011	The Life Zone	Roger Fields	
2012	Broadway's Finest	Caesar	
2012	Pandora’s Box	Tom O’Reilley	Short, Actor, Director
2015	Thompson Street	Bobby	Short
2015	The Warriors: Last Subway Ride Home	'Fox'	Video short
2021	6:45	Larry	

=== Television ===
Year	Title	Role	Notes
1985	Miami Vice	DEA Agent Thompson	Episode: Bushido
1986	The Equalizer	Jim Kaufman	Episode: "Nightscape"
1987	All My Children	Otis Price	Unknown episodes
1988	The Equalizer	Shep Morrow	Episode: "The Child Broker"
1997	Sliders	Randy	Episode: "Slither"
1998	NYPD Blue	William Weaver Sr.	Episode: "Weaver of Hate"
1998	Mike Hammer, Private Eye	George Speaker	Episode: "Big Brother's Secret"
1998	Buffy the Vampire Slayer	Second Cop	Episode: "Becoming"
2001–2003	Oz	Henry Stanton	7 episodes
2001	Law and Order Criminal Intent	Mo Turman	Episode: "Jones"
2003	Law and Order Criminal Intent	Lance Brody	Episode: "A Murderer Among Us"
2006	One Life to Live	Decker Denton	Unknown episodes
2018	Homeland	Clayton	Episode: "Useful Idiot"
2019	The Punisher	Arthur Walsh	Episode: "Scar Tissue"

=== Videogames ===
Year	Title	Role	Notes
2005	The Warriors	'Fox'	
2008	Grand Theft Auto IV	Priest	Voice and motion capture
