= On the Yard =

1978 American film

- Directed by: Raphael D. Silver
- Written by: Malcolm Braly
- Based on: On the Yard by Malcolm Braly
- Produced by: Joan Micklin Silver
- Starring: John Heard
- Cinematography: Alan Metzger
- Edited by: Evan A. Lottman
- Music by: Charles Gross
- Distributed by: Midwest Films
- Release dates: September 16, 1978 (Toronto); January 19, 1979 (New York City)
- Running time: 102 minutes
- Country: United States
- Language: English
- Budget: $1 million

On the Yard is a 1978 American prison drama film written by Malcolm Braly, directed by Raphael D. Silver and starring John Heard. It is based on Braly's novel of the same name.

== Plot ==
Paul Juleson is a newly sentenced prisoner who has just arrived in a Pennsylvania state prison and is unfamiliar with prison life. The prison yard, where inmates spend most of their time, has its own rules separate from what the guards control. At the top is someone named Chilly, a smooth, street-smart inmate who runs the trade of cigarettes and contraband. Nothing moves inside without his approval.

Trying to get by, Juleson borrows some cigarettes from Chilly, promising to pay him back when he gets money from outside. When the money doesn't come, the debt grows and Chilly's patience wears thin. Juleson soon finds himself caught in a situation where standing up for yourself could mean violence, isolation, or worse.

Around him, others find their own ways to manage prison life. One man, Morris, dreams of escaping and starts building a homemade hot-air balloon. Meanwhile, the guards, led by Captain Blake, are aware that Chilly's influence among the prisoners is stronger than their own authority, yet they do little to interfere for fear of sparking unrest. As tensions rise, Juleson must decide whether to surrender to the system or risk everything to hold on to his dignity.

== Cast ==
- John Heard as Paul Juleson
- Thomas G. Waites as Billy "Chilly" Oberholster
- Mike Kellin as "Red" a.k.a. "Moon"
- Richard Bright as Nunn
- Joe Grifasi as Morris
- Lane Smith as Captain Blake
- Richard Hayes as "Stick"
- Hector Troy as Gasolino
- Richard Jamieson as Lieutenant Carpenter
- Thomas Toner as The Prison Warden
- Ron Faber as Manning
- David Clennon as Psychiatrist
- Don Blakely as Tate
- J.C. Quinn as Luther
- Dominic Chianese as Mendoza
- Eddie Jones as Lieutenant Olson
- Ben Slack as Clemmons
- James Remar as Larson
- Dave McCalley as Redmond
- Ludwick Villani as "Candy"
- John Taylor as Schulte
- Ivan Yount as Inmate With Peaches
- Ralph Hobbs as Zeke
- David Berman as "Caterpillar"

== Production ==
=== Development ===
The rights to the novel were purchased by Warner Bros in 1970, with the studio intending to develop it into a feature film. The initial production team included Al Wasserman as producer and Calder Willingham as screenwriter, while John Calley was set to be the executive producer.

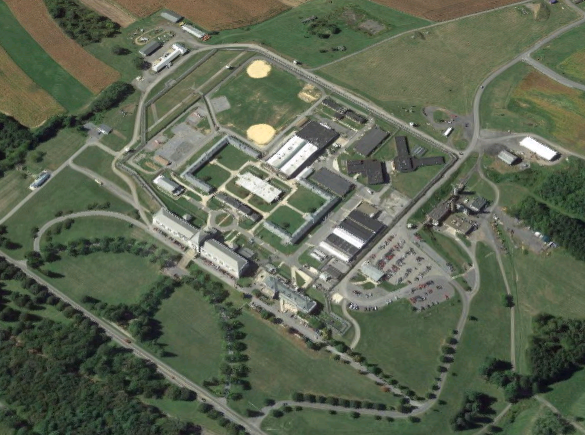
Rockview prison from overhead in 2020

The film was developed several years later, with Raphael D. Silver making his directional debut, having previously worked as a real estate developer.

The production team conducted research at numerous prisons across the United States before selecting Rockview State Correctional Facility, a medium security prison. Although the prison warden expressed little interest in allowing a film to be shot there, Pennsylvania's state corrections commissioner, William Robinson, approved the request after reading the novel and saying he "loved it". Silver later noted that Robinson neither asked to read the screenplay nor became involved in the production itself.

=== Casting ===
The film featured real inmates and staff as background extras, while some had small speaking parts. Inmates were paid $6 per day for working as an extra, which was at least 10 times more their typical prison salary, and the fee was considerably more for those with speaking parts. The payment was credited to their prison account as it could not be paid directly. No women were cast into the film.

=== Filming ===
Filming began on October 10, 1977, and wrapped the day before Thanksgiving, on November 23, around a week ahead of schedule.

Concerns among some prison staff about filming within an active prison proved justified on several occasions. During one fight scene, a guard was injured when a convict kicked him several times in the leg. In another incident, a cast member dressed in a prison uniform was mistaken for a real inmate while using the lavatory and was reportedly "slammed against the wall and snarled at" before guards realized their mistake.

Discussing the idea behind the hot-air balloon, Braly indicates he got the inspiration from a former cellmate, based around "the story of the transcendent dream", representing the character of Morris dreaming of escape but not having the courage to achieve it. The production opted not to feature any homosexual relationships between inmates, which was a theme present in the novel.

=== Post-production ===
The film was produced on a $1 million budget and its theatrical runtime was 102 minutes. Producers paid the prison $10,000 towards a welfare fund for the inmates, which partly funded a new movie screen. An estimated 450 inmates and up to 75 prison staff were involved in the film.

== Release ==
The film premiered in New York City on January 19, 1979. There was a special screening at the prison on January 24, 1979, attended by Braly, who had mostly not been present during on-location shooting.

== Reception ==
Vincent Canby of The New York Times gave the film a positive review and wrote, "In adapting his novel to the screen, Mr. Braly has had to eliminate many background details, but the characters are so vividly presented in the film's present tense that one Accepts most of them for what they seem to be. It is one of the virtues of the screenplay, and of Mr. Silver's direction of it, that the characters shift and grow in our awareness as the film progresses." Malcolm L. Johnson of the Hartford Courant also gave the film a positive review and wrote, "...it must be unequivocally stated that the strengths of this film outweigh its defects."

Rex Reed for the New York Daily News wrote less favorably of the film, suggesting it was "even duller than it should be" due to being based on a novel. Reed felt the film lacked a sense of urgency and anxiety, comparing it to being like "reading a training manual". He praised the acting performance of Heard and noted the film's choice to film in an actual prison gave it authenticity that was typically lacking in other prison films.
