= Incapable (Keyshia Cole song) =

2017 single by Keyshia Cole

Single by Keyshia Cole

from the album 11:11 Reset
- Released: August 25, 2017
- Studio: NRG Recording (North Hollywood, Los Angeles)
- Genre: R&B
- Length: 3:24
- Label: Epic
- Songwriters: Keyshia Cole; Gabrielle Nowee; Marcella Araica; Sean Fenton
- Producers: Danja; Guitarboy

Keyshia Cole singles chronology
"You" (2017)	"Incapable" (2017)	"All Me" (2019)

"Incapable" is a song by American singer and songwriter Keyshia Cole from her seventh studio album, 11:11 Reset (2017). The song was written by Cole, Gabrielle Nowee, Marcella Araica, and Elijah Blake, with production being handled by Danja and Guitarboy. The song was released for digital download and streaming as the album's second single on August 25, 2017, by Epic Records. An R&B ballad, it is backed by an acoustic guitar and includes a sample of Rose Royce's 1976 single "I'm Going Down". Lyrically, the song discusses a relationship where one partner is putting in more effort than the other. Cole elucidated that the song was inspired by her own experiences in her previous romantic relationships.

Music critics responded positively to "Incapable", praising Cole's vocals and its lyrics. An accompanying music video, directed by Mike Ho, was released on October 6, 2017. It takes place in a speakeasy and depicts Cole as she gets revenge on her boyfriend after suddenly finding out that he had been cheating on her. The video received positive reviews from critics, who praised its retro style theme. In further promotion, Cole performed the song on television programs such as the Soul Train Music Awards, The Wendy Williams Show, Love & Hip Hop: Hollywood, and Jimmy Kimmel Live!.

== Background and release ==
"Incapable" was written by Keyshia Cole, Gabrielle Nowee, Marcella Araica, and Elijah Blake, while produced by Danja and Guitarboy. The audio was mixed by Jaycen Joshua, Maddoxx Chhim, and Araica. Randy Urbanski worked as the recording engineer, while Chhim provided additional support as assistant engineer. The vocals were produced by Cole, with assistance from Blake. The song was recorded and mixed at NRG Recording Studios in North Hollywood, Los Angeles.

On July 24, 2017, she previewed the song during a studio session on the premiere of the fourth season of the reality television series Love & Hip Hop: Hollywood. Epic Records released the song for digital download and streaming on August 25, 2017, as the second single from 11:11 Reset, before distributing it to urban contemporary radio stations in the United States on September 17. On September 30, the song was ranked the fifth most-added single at urban adult contemporary radio. In October, Cole gave an interview about 11:11 Reset with Stephanie Ogbogu of Vibe. Cole explained the inspiration behind the song, saying: "This song channels my own experience as a woman, realizing that sometimes things are not completely about you. Sometimes it's about someone else not being able to give you that. Someone not being capable of even loving you the way that you love."

== Composition and lyrics ==
"Incapable"
A 22-second sample of the song. Music critics declared the song as one of Cole's signature ballads.

Musically, "Incapable" is an R&B ballad which lasts for a duration of 3:24 (three minutes and twenty-five seconds). The song is composed in the key of B major, set in common time signature, and has a moderately fast tempo of 180 beats per minute. Instrumentation consists of an acoustic guitar, a Roland TR-808, and an emotional rhythm. It includes a sample of American singer Rose Royce's single "I'm Going Down" (1976). Jamie Wexler of ThisisRnb noted the elements of classic ballads and touches of old-school soul music, and Chris Rizik of SoulTracks interpreted the composition as a power ballad with a "bluesy undertone". Lyrics include: "It's time to grow up / I embarrassed myself enough / 'Cause I wouldn't leave you / Even my family know the truth, yeah." Cole further sings about the relationship in the chorus, singing, "Oh, what a feeling / The one that I thought that I needed / Was incapable of needing me back / Incapable of loving like that."

Lyrically, the song discusses a relationship where one partner is putting in more effort than the other. An editor from Rap-Up viewed the lyrics as "heartbreaking" and felt that they revolve around an "ill-fated relationship". Elle Breezy of Singersroom felt that the lyrics reference Cole's split from Daniel Gibson and that the song tells "the heartbreaking tale of realizing the person she loved didn't put in the same efforts into the relationship". Isha Thorpe of iHeartRadio also felt that the lyrics focus on her split from Gibson, despite not being solely written by Cole. Thorpe also suggested that the song "tells the story of a woman finally letting go of an ex who wronged her multiple times".

== Reception ==
"Incapable" was met with generally positive reviews from music critics. Royal Bey from The Source felt that the "strong" ballad reflects Cole's "uncanny" ability to hold "beautiful" notes. Da'Shan Smith of Billboard labeled the song as an example of traditional R&B and declared that Cole "flirts with mixing trap 808s beneath the old swing of the '60s" on the song. According to Ken Hamm from Soul Bounce, "Incapable" is a ballad about "coming to terms with the fact that the one you want just isn't the one for you". Hamm further added that Cole uses "an old school sound blending blues, gospel and even a little country and lyrics that feel personal yet poetic" and described the first verse as "a come to Jesus" one.

An editor from TheGrio thought that the song "talks about a lover who simply doesn't have what it takes", while Biana Garwood of Ebony deemed it as a "melancholy" track. Keithan Samuels, writing for Rated R&B, classified "Incapable" as part of Cole's "solid foundation on songs related to love and relationships" and praised Cole's consistency of singing love songs. James Wong of Tokyo Weekender described the song as "distinctively Keyshia", while Tony Centeno from Vibe described it as "unique".

Commercially, "Incapable" debuted at number 30 on the US Adult R&B Airplay chart for the week ending October 21, 2017, and later peaked at number 19 on the chart dated January 27, 2018, spending a total of 19 weeks on the listing. The song also reached number 19 on the Hot R&B Songs chart dated November 11, 2017. Following its airplay gains on the Urban AC format, it entered the R&B/Hip-Hop Airplay chart, where it peaked at number 50 on the issue dated January 20, 2018.

== Music video ==
A music video for "Incapable", directed by Mike He, produced by Vanda Lee, and choreographed by Chris Grant, was made available through Cole's Vevo account on October 6, 2017. Prior to its premiere, Cole debuted a trailer during her appearance on the American talk show The Real. Cole had also posted several images of herself on set via her official Instagram account one month prior to the release.

In the video, Cole and her love interest walk into a speakeasy, where men are gambling and music is playing in the background. After they sit down together, Cole then goes to the bathroom, where she overhears a conversation between two women in which one of them admits to the other that she is having an affair with Cole's love interest. As "Incapable" starts to play, Cole is shown wearing a sleeveless starch white top and white wide brim hat while delivering a "heart-wrenching" performance of the song; this scene appears throughout. Impressed by her performance, members of the audience join the stage to start dancing and singing with her. A waitress later walks up to the love interest to deliver him a plate full of drinks but then mistakenly spills the drinks on his lap. Cole stands in front of the table as it happens and then aggressively walks away, leaving her love interest humiliated.

Critics praised the video for its retro style and felt that Cole was paying homage to the 1920s decade. Samuels of Rated R&B described the video as "cinematic". Mikey Fresh of Vibe complimented the video's concept and its production, writing: "Having overcome of her share of shitty relationships, the Oakland-raised talent goes way back with her new video." Sarah Michel of VH1 praised the wardrobe and choreography in the video and also interpreted that it ends just like "almost all of those situations". An editor from Singersroom felt that Cole gave her love interest a "subtle payback" before leaving him and described the speakeasy as a "Cotton Club-styled venue". Garwood of Ebony felt that Cole had decided "to take things into her own hands by getting revenge on the man who stole her heart" in the video.

== Live performances ==
On January 31, 2017, Cole performed a preview of "Incapable" live on Jimmy Kimmel Live!, following the performance of its preceding single, "You". Breezy of Singersroom praised the performance and noted that Cole "pushed through performing the soulful ballad", despite having complications when fixing her earpiece while performing. Cole performed the song for The Wendy Williams Show on October 19, 2017, while wearing a white pantsuit with a red fur coat and top hat and being accompanied by male backup dancers. Antwane Folk of Rated R&B described the performance as "heartfelt" and compared the outfit worn by Cole during the performance to the signature look of fictional character Carmen Sandiego, while an editor from ThisisRnb described the performance as "stirring".

On October 22, 2017, Cole performed the song during BET Her's inaugural television special BET Her Fights: Breast Cancer, and during the reunion of the fourth season of Love & Hip Hop: Hollywood the following day. On November 26, Cole performed the song at the 2017 Soul Train Music Awards, with the performance replicating the music video. Trent Fitzgerald of The Boombox viewed the performance as "dazzling" and declared that it was a "sexy rendition" of the song. Hamm of Soul Bounce complimented Cole's vocals, describing it as a "emotional, albeit by-the-numbers performance" and that "stood out" amongst her past live performances. Mark Elibert of Billboard positively characterized the performance as "exceptional".

== Track listing ==
Digital download
No.	Title	Length
1.	"Incapable"	3:24

== Credits and personnel ==
Recording

- Recorded and mixed at NRG Recording Studios in North Hollywood, Los Angeles

Personnel

- Keyshia Cole – vocals, songwriter, vocal producer
- Elijah Blake – songwriter, vocal producer
- Marcella Araica – songwriter, mixing
- Gabrielle Nowee – songwriter
- Danja – production
- Patrick "Guitarboy" Hayes – production
- Randy Urbanski – recording, audio engineer
- Maddoxx Chhim – mixing, engineer
- Jaycen Joshua – mixing

Credits adapted from 11:11 Reset album liner notes.

== Charts ==
Chart performance for "Incapable"
Chart (2018)	Peak position
US R&B/Hip-Hop Airplay (Billboard)	50

== Release history ==
Region	Date	Format(s)	Label	Ref.
United States	August 25, 2017	Digital download; streaming	Epic Records	
United States	September 17, 2017	Urban contemporary radio	Epic Records	
