= All the Way Up =

Single by Fat Joe and Remy Ma featuring French Montana and Infared

from the album Plata O Plomo
- Released: March 2, 2016
- Recorded: 2015
- Studio: Diamond District Studios, New York City, New York
- Genre: Hip hop
- Length: 3:11
- Label: RNG; Empire
- Songwriters: Various: Joseph Cartagena; Reminisce Mackie; Shawn Carter (remix); Calvin Broadus (Westside remix); Jayceon Taylor (Westside remix); Earl Stevens (Westside remix); Park Jae-beom (Asian remix); Kalassy Nikoff (Asian remix); Mikael Lozach (Asian remix); Johan Ishak (Asian remix)
- Producers: Edsclusive; Cool & Dre

Fat Joe singles chronology
"Stressin" (2014)	"All the Way Up" (2016)	"Cookin" (2016)

Remy Ma singles chronology
"Hands Down" (2015)	"All the Way Up" (2016)	"Cookin" (2016)

French Montana singles chronology
"Moses" (2015)	"All the Way Up" (2016)	"Figure It Out" (2016)

Music video
- "All the Way Up" on YouTube

Remix

Jay-Z singles chronology
"Pop Style" (2016)	"All the Way Up (Remix)" (2016)	"Drug Dealers Anonymous" (2016)

"All the Way Up" is a hip hop song by American rappers Fat Joe and Remy Ma, featuring American rappers French Montana and Infared. It was released on March 2, 2016, by RNG (Rap's New Generation) and EMPIRE, as the first single from their collaborative album Plata O Plomo. The song was produced by Edsclusive and Cool & Dre and recorded at Diamond District Studios by Dwayne Shippy iLL Wayno in New York City, New York. At the 59th Grammy Awards, it was nominated for Best Rap Performance and Best Rap Song.

== Music video ==
The song's accompanying music video premiered on March 26, 2016, on Fat Joe's YouTube account on Vevo. Remy Ma's husband Papoose, DJ Khaled, Fred the Godson and Farid Bang make cameo appearances in the video.

== Chart performance ==
The song peaked at number 27 on the US Billboard Hot 100. It is Fat Joe's first top 40 hit since his 2007 hit "I Won't Tell", featuring J. Holiday, as well as the only top 40 for Remy Ma as a solo artist and French Montana's second biggest hit. In France, "All the Way Up" has peaked at number 85, becoming Fat Joe's first chart entry in that country since 2002's "What's Luv?", featuring Ashanti. In February 2021, the song was certified triple platinum by the Recording Industry Association of America (RIAA) for combined sales and streaming equivalent units of over three million copies in the United States.

== Track listing ==
- Digital download
1. "All the Way Up" (Explicit) (Fat Joe and Remy Ma featuring French Montana and Infared) — 3:11
- Digital download (Remix)
1. "All the Way Up" (Remix) (Fat Joe, Remy Ma and Jay Z featuring French Montana and Infared) — 4:44
- Digital download (EDM Remix)
1. "All the Way Up" (EDM Remix) (Fat Joe, Remy Ma, David Guetta and Glowinthedark featuring French Montana and Infared) — 3:31
- Digital download (Westside Remix)
1. "All the Way Up" (Westside Remix) (Fat Joe, Remy Ma, Snoop Dogg, the Game and E-40 featuring French Montana and Infared) — 5:17
- Digital download (Asian Remix)
1. "All the Way Up" (Asian Remix) (Fat Joe and Remy Ma featuring Jay Park, AK-69, Daboyway, SonaOne and Joe Flizzow) — 4:50
- YouTube stream (BangerMusik Remix)
1. "All the Way Up" (BangerMusik Remix) (Fat Joe featuring Farid Bang, Kollegah, Summer Cem and Seyed) — 2:54

== Remixes ==
The official remix features new verses by Fat Joe and Remy Ma, including an additional verse by Jay-Z. Rappers Meek Mill, Fabolous and Jadakiss also recorded a remix to the song. Rapper Papoose, who is also the spouse of Remy Ma, recorded a freestyle as well. An official remix by David Guetta and Glowinthedark was released on May 27, 2016. A Westside remix was released, featuring Snoop Dogg, the Game and E-40. A reggaeton remix was released featuring verses from Daddy Yankee and Nicky Jam. In addition, a German "BangerMusik" remix with Farid Bang, Summer Cem, Kollegah and Seyed, was released. The Asian remix was released, featuring Jay Park, AK-69, DaboyWay, SonaOne and Joe Flizzow.

== Charts ==
=== Weekly charts ===
Chart (2016)	Peak position
Canada Hot 100 (Billboard)	46
France (SNEP)	85
UK Singles (Official Charts)	157
US Billboard Hot 100	27
US Hot R&B/Hip-Hop Songs (Billboard)	9
US Rhythmic Airplay (Billboard)	4

=== Year-end charts ===
Chart (2016)	Position
US Billboard Hot 100	87
US Hot R&B/Hip-Hop Songs (Billboard)	30
US Rhythmic (Billboard)	25

== Certifications ==
Region	Certification	Certified units/sales
Denmark (IFPI Danmark)	Gold	45,000^{‡}
France (SNEP)	Platinum	133,333^{‡}
Italy (FIMI)	Gold	25,000^{‡}
New Zealand (RMNZ)	Platinum	30,000^{‡}
United Kingdom (BPI)	Gold	400,000^{‡}
United States (RIAA)	3× Platinum	3,000,000^{‡}
^{‡} Sales+streaming figures based on certification alone.

== Release history ==
Region	Date	Format	Version	Label	Ref.
United States	March 2, 2016	Digital download	Original	Terror Squad; E1	
Various	May 27, 2016	Digital download	Remix	Terror Squad; E1	
Various	June 3, 2016	Digital download	EDM Remix	Terror Squad; E1	
Various	June 24, 2016	Digital download	Westside Remix	Terror Squad; E1	
Various	August 17, 2016	Digital download	Asian Remix	Terror Squad; E1	
