= There's Something About Remy: Based on a True Story =

Studio album by Remy Ma
- Released: February 7, 2006
- Recorded: 2005
- Genre: Hip-hop
- Length: 55:43
- Label: SRC; Terror Squad; Universal
- Producer: Cool & Dre; Knobody; Scott Storch; Swizz Beatz; The Alchemist; Emile

Remy Ma chronology
Most Anticipated (2005)	There's Something About Remy: Based on a True Story (2006)	The BX Files (2007)

Singles from There's Something About Remy: Based on a True Story
- 1. "Whuteva" Released: August 2, 2005; 2. "Conceited" Released: December 13, 2005; 3. "Feel So Good" Released: April 25, 2006

There's Something About Remy: Based on a True Story is the debut studio album by American rapper Remy Ma. It was released on February 7, 2006, by SRC Records, Universal Records and Terror Squad Entertainment. The album's release date served as the sixth anniversary of her mentor Big Pun's death. The title and cover art coincides with the 1998 film There's Something About Mary.

== Background ==
While growing up in Castle Hill Projects in the Bronx, New York, Remy Ma often saw the consequences and terrors of her family's drug abuse with her own eyes. She was forced to take care of her little brothers and sisters at her young age and retreated from her home issues by writing poetry. Her reputation quickly grew around the Bronx and word eventually got to the late MC Big Pun of her and her work. After one meeting and a freestyle session, Pun became her mentor. Ma made her first appearances in the music industry on Big Pun's album Yeeeah Baby (under the name Remy Martin) on the tracks such as "Ms. Martin" and "You Was Wrong".

Upon the death of Big Pun, rapper Fat Joe signed Smith to his imprint label under SRC and Universal and made her a member of Terror Squad. Following the success of Lean Back, which garnered Remy a Grammy nomination, Ma released three singles from her debut album There's Something About Remy, the songs "Whuteva", "Conceited" and "Feels So Good" The album moved 40,000 units in its opening week and 160,000 units within the first year. Smith decided to end her relationship with Fat Joe and the Terror Squad, breaking her deal with SRC/Universal in the process.

== Singles ==
The album's lead single, called "Whuteva" was released on August 2, 2005. The song peaked at number 1 on Billboard Bubbling Under R&B/Hip-Hop Songs chart, number 18 on the Hot R&B/Hip-Hop Songs and number 79 on the Top R&B Songs. In December 2006, the music video was added to her Official YouTube account.

The album's second single, called "Conceited" was released on December 13, 2005. The song peaked at number 7 Billboard Hot R&B/Hip-Hop Song Recurrents chart, number 17 on the Hot Rap Tracks, number 90 on the Billboard Hot 100, number 71 on Billboard Radio Songs chart, number 24 on Billboard R&B/Hip-Hop Airplay chart, number 4 on Billboard Bubbling Under R&B/Hip-Hop Songs and number 17 on Billboard Rap Airplay chart. The music video premiered on January 7, 2006, on VH1.

The album's third single, "Feel So Good" was released on April 25, 2006. The song features a guest appearance from American singer-songwriter Ne-Yo. The song peaked at number 1 on Billboard Bubbling Under Hot 100, number 20 on the Hot R&B/Hip-Hop Songs, number 11 on Billboard Hot Rap Songs, number 11 on Billboard Rap Airplay chart and number 2 on Billboard R&B/Hip-Hop Recurrents chart with no promotion. A video was scheduled to be filmed in the Dominican Republic, but never took place.

== Critical reception ==
Professional ratings
Review scores
Source	Rating
AllMusic	4/5 stars
Blender	3.5/5 stars
HipHopDX	3/5 stars
Now	3/5 Ns
PopMatters	6/10
Rolling Stone	3/5 stars
Vibe	4/5 stars

AllMusic critic Andy Kellman described the album as a confident and assertive debut, highlighting Remy Ma’s ability to match high-energy production on tracks like "Whuteva" and "Conceited." He noted that while much of the album focuses on self-celebration rather than substance, her delivery and presence remain compelling. Kellman added that more reflective songs like "Still" show emotional depth, though they are ultimately overshadowed by the album’s more aggressive, club-oriented material. Jason Richards, writing for Now, remarked that Ma was "working with the sort of production hotness usually reserved for her more obese, more famous pals" on the album.

Spin critic Julianne Escobedo Shepherd described the album as a rejection of gender categorization, noting that Ma "opens fire on both men and women" while adopting a "fortress of prefab personas" in a male-dominated rap landscape. She praised the production but found some themes less convincing, concluding that the autobiographical songs best demonstrate her fearlessness. PopMatters editor Justin Cober-Lake argued that the album was weighed down by repetitive self-aggrandizement despite flashes of skill, criticizing parts of the lyricism while praising some production. He concluded that the later, more introspective tracks reveal greater depth and are the album's strongest moments.

== Commercial performance ==
There's Something About Remy: Based on a True Story opened and peaked at number 33 on the US Billboard 200, number 2 on Top Rap Albums and number 7 on Top R&B/Hip-Hop Albums chart, selling over 35,000 copies in its first week.

== Track listing ==
There's Something About Remy: Based on a True Story track listing
No.	Title	Writer(s)	Producer(s)	Length
1.	"Pun's Words"	Reminisce Smith; Christopher Rios; Michael "DJ Shok" Gomez		0:40
2.	"She's Gone"	R. Smith; Anthony Best; Kaz Tabata; Bunny Sigler; Phil Hurtt	Buckwild	2:54
3.	"Lights, Camera, Action"	R. Smith; Rios; Jerome Foster; Angel Aguilar; Marc Shemer; Tom Scott; Kevin Keaton; Mohandas Dewese; Lamar Hill	Agallah; Scram Jones	3:23
4.	"Tight" (featuring Fat Joe)	R. Smith; Joseph Cartagena; Marcello Valenzano; Andre Lyon	Cool & Dre	4:21
5.	"Whuteva"	R. Smith; Kasseem Dean; David Shire; Modest Mussorgsky	Swizz Beatz	3:46
6.	"Conceited Messages (skit)" (featuring Roc Raida)	Anthony Williams		1:46
7.	"Conceited (There's Something About Remy)"	R. Smith; Scott Storch	Scott Storch	3:39
8.	"Feel So Good" (featuring Ne-Yo)	R. Smith; Shaffer Smith; Foster; Levar Coppin	Knobody; LV	4:02
9.	"I'm"	R. Smith; Lavell Crump	David Banner	4:07
10.	"Thug Love" (featuring Big Pun)	R. Smith; Rios; Alan Maman; Lamont Dozier; McKinley Jackson	The Alchemist	3:58
11.	"Secret Location"	R. Smith; Yefry Ramirez	J-Notes	3:38
12.	"In-Da-Street (skit)" (featuring Roc Raida)			0:16
13.	"Bilingual" (featuring Ivy Queen)	R. Smith; Martha Pesante; Coppin	LV	4:03
14.	"Conscience (skit)" (featuring Roc Raida and Wize G)			0:58
15.	"Guilty"	R. Smith; Deleno Matthews	Sean C	2:57
16.	"Crazy"	R. Smith; Emile Haynie; Luther Vandross	Emile	4:02
17.	"What's Going On" (featuring Keyshia Cole)	R. Smith; Claudette Ortiz; Matthews; Che Harris; Joe Davi	Che Harris; Joe Davi	3:55
18.	"Still"	R. Smith; Valenzano; Lyon	Cool & Dre	5:02

iTunes bonus track
No.	Title	Writer(s)	Producer(s)	Length
19.	"My Life"	R. Smith; William Peele; W. Sams; Coppin	LV	3:18

Japan bonus tracks
No.	Title	Writer(s)	Producer(s)	Length
19.	"Can't Nobody"	R. Smith; A. Lyon; M. Valenzano	Cool & Dre	3:02
20.	"Lights, Camera, Action (Remix)" (featuring Kreva)	R. Smith; A. Aguilar; M. Shemer	Agallah; Scram Jones	3:26

Sample credits

- "Pun's Words" contains excerpts from "Ms. Martin" as performed by Bun B.
- "She's Gone" contains elements of "My Other Love" as performed by Bunny Sigler.
- "Lights, Camera, Action" features samples from "Action" as performed by The Treacherous Three.
- "Whuteva" contains elements of "Night on Disco Mountain".
- "Thug Love" contains a sample from "Let Me Make Love to You" as performed by Lamont Dozier.
- "Crazy" embodies portions from "This Strange Feeling" as performed by Luther Vandross.

== Charts ==
=== Weekly charts ===
Weekly chart performance for There's Something About Remy: Based on a True Story
Chart (2006)	Peak position
US Billboard 200	33
US Top R&B/Hip-Hop Albums (Billboard)	7
US Top Rap Albums (Billboard)	2

=== Year-end charts ===
Year-end chart performance for There's Something About Remy: Based on a True Story
Chart (2006)	Position
US Top R&B/Hip-Hop Albums (Billboard)	92
