= Plata O Plomo =

Studio album by Fat Joe and Remy Ma
- Released: February 17, 2017
- Recorded: 2015–2017
- Genre: Hip hop
- Length: 45:19
- Labels: RNG; Empire
- Producers: 808-Ray; iLL Wayno; Edsclusive; Eric Kovacs; iLLA; Street Runner; Tarik Azzouz; Vindata

Fat Joe chronology
The Darkside III (2013)	Plata O Plomo (2017)	Family Ties (2019)

Remy Ma chronology
I'm Around (2014)	Plata O Plomo (2017)	Reminisce (TBA)

Singles from Plata O Plomo
- 1. "All the Way Up" Released: March 2, 2016; 2. "Cookin" Released: August 3, 2016; 3. "Money Showers" Released: November 11, 2016; 4. "Heartbreak" Released: June 11, 2017

Plata O Plomo is the collaborative studio album by American rappers Fat Joe and Remy Ma, released February 17, 2017 by RNG (Rap's New Generation) and Empire.

== Background ==
The title of the album, "plata o plomo", translates from Spanish to "silver or lead", meaning "money or bullets". The phrase was used by Colombian drug lord Pablo Escobar who would offer government officials and law enforcement the choice of taking a bribe, or having a murder contract placed against them. Fat Joe commented: "The name of the album is called Plata o Plomo... money or bullets. You know what I'm saying? However you want it."

== Critical response ==
Professional ratings
Review scores
Source	Rating
AllMusic	3.5/5 stars
HipHopDX	(3.2/5)
Pitchfork	(5.3/10)
XXL	(XL)

Neil Yeung of AllMusic gave the album 3.5 out of 5 stars, praising the album for its mix of old school hip-hop with a new modern radio-friendly sound, saying that the album "plays like a mixtape (or playlist) with a wide variety of club-friendly hip-hop that often tugs on '90s nostalgia heartstrings while updating their sound with 2017 production". XXL gave the album four out of five stars, noting that the album is "a triumphant return for Fat Joe and Remy Ma. Scott Glaysher of HipHopDX gave the album a 3.2 out of 5 stars, saying: "Plata O Plomo was definitely made with the right intentions and features some solid rapping but the most memorable moment remains “All the Way Up” which has since been inducted into Hip Hop's overplayed archives."

In a negative review, Evan Rytlewski of Pitchfork gave the album a 5.3 out of 10, and said: "On this collaborative LP, their hard styles are too similar to make for a compelling dynamic."

== Commercial performance ==
Plata O Plomo debuted at number 44 on the Billboard 200 chart, earning 11,158 album-equivalent units in its first week. The album also debuted at number 19 on the US Top R&B/Hip-Hop Albums chart and number three on the US Independent Albums charts respectively.

== Track listing ==
Plata O Plomo track listing
No.	Title	Writer(s)	Producer(s)	Length
1.	"Warning" (featuring Kat Dahlia)	Joseph Cartagena; Reminisce Mackie; Daryl Kent Jones	Eric Kovacs; Cool & Dre	3:36
2.	"Swear to God" (featuring Kent Jones)	Cartagena; Mackie; Jones	Cool & Dre	3:23
3.	"Spaghetti" (featuring Kent Jones)	Cartagena; Mackie; Jones	Edsclusive; Cool & Dre	4:13
4.	"All the Way Up" (featuring French Montana and Infared)	Cartagena; Mackie	Edsclusive; Cool & Dre	3:11
5.	"How Can I Forget" (featuring Kent Jones)	Cartagena; Mackie; Jones	iLLA	4:25
6.	"How Long"	Cartagena; Mackie	Street Runner; Tarik Azzouz	3:26
7.	"Go Crazy" (featuring Sevyn Streeter and BJ the Chicago Kid)	Cartagena; Mackie; Jones	808-Ray; Cool & Dre	4:12
8.	"Heartbreak" (featuring The-Dream and Vindata)	Cartagena; Branden Ratcliff; Jared Poythress; Johan Lovken	Vindata	4:16
9.	"Cookin" (with French Montana featuring RySoValid)	Cartagena; Mackie; Ryan Cartagena	iLLA	3:46
10.	"Money Showers" (featuring Ty Dolla Sign)	Cartagena	Cool & Dre	3:45
11.	"Too Quick" (featuring Kingston)	Cartagena; Mackie	iLL Wayno	3:56
12.	"Dreamin" (featuring Stephanie Mills)	Cartagena; Mackie; Legaxy	Cool & Dre	3:52
Total length:				45:19

== Charts ==
Chart (2017)	Peak position
US Billboard 200	44
US Independent Albums (Billboard)	3
US Top R&B/Hip-Hop Albums (Billboard)	19
