= Money Showers =

Single by Fat Joe and Remy Ma featuring Ty Dolla Sign

from the album Plata O Plomo
- Released: November 11, 2016
- Recorded: 2016
- Genre: Hip hop; R&B
- Length: 3:45
- Label: RNG; Empire
- Songwriters: Joseph Cartagena; Reminisce Mackie; Tyrone Griffin Jr.
- Producer: Cool & Dre

Fat Joe singles chronology
"Cookin" (2016)	"Money Showers" (2016)	"Heartbreak" (2017)

Remy Ma singles chronology
"FAB" (2016)	"Money Showers" (2016)	"You" (2017)

Ty Dolla Sign singles chronology
"4 Lit" (2016)	"Money Showers" (2016)	"Are You Sure?" (2016)

"Money Showers" is a song recorded by American rappers Fat Joe and Remy Ma. It was released on November 11, 2016, as the third single from their collaborative album, Plata O Plomo. The song, produced by Cool & Dre, features guest vocals from American singer Ty Dolla Sign. It samples Ralph Tresvant's 1991 R&B hit "Do What I Gotta Do" & Bobby Brown's 1988 single Rock Wit'cha. The music video for the song premiered on January 12, 2017, via Tidal.

== Release and composition ==
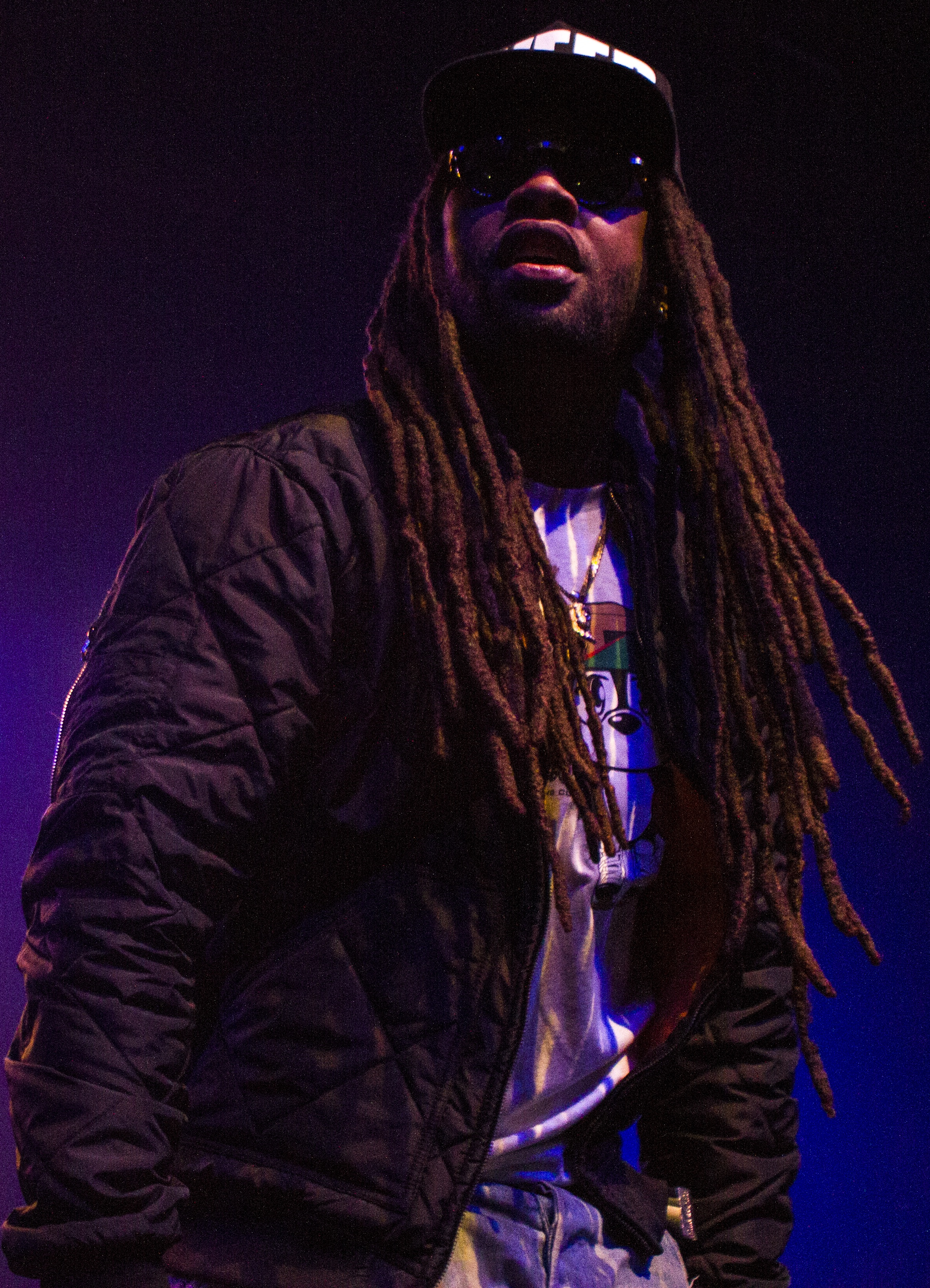
The song's hook is sung by Ty Dolla Sign.

The song premiered on November 10, 2016, and the next day was released for digital download as a single on iTunes. "Money Showers" is the third single from Fat Joe and Remy Ma's collaborative album, Plata O Plomo, which was released on February 17, 2017.

"Money Showers" is hip hop and R&B track. In an interview with Billboard magazine, Remy Ma explained the song's meaning; "'Money Showers' to me means being bestowed with an unlimited amount of everything; an excess of everything whether materialistic, emotional, sexual -- like total ecstasy". While talking about working with Ty Dolla Sign, Fat Joe said:

It was an honor and pleasure working with someone I'm so close to as a friend, who I also have tremendous respect for as an artist. I'm proud of this song.

== Critical reception ==
Jessie Morris from Complex wrote; "The song if fueled by a very smooth, R&B beat that makes it feel like the trio is channeling their old school sound. As always, Ma's hard-hitting bars provide the perfect offset to Joe's verses while Ty Dolla Sign polishes the whole thing from the background with some incredibly silky ad-libs." Emmanuel C.M. of XXL wrote that the song "sounds like it’s going to find its way on the charts too". Rap-Up praised Ty Dolla Sign's vocals saying that he "lays down some smooth melodies". OnSMASH wrote; "TY$ delivers a fire hook as usual, while Fat Joe and Remy Ma do what they do on the verse side of things."

== Music video ==
The music video for "Money Showers" premiered on January 12, 2017, via streaming service Tidal. It was uploaded to Fat Joe's Vevo channel on January 15, 2017. The Eif Rivera-directed video was filmed in Miami and was inspired by 1998 comedy/drama film, The Players Club. Actor Anthony Johnson, who appeared in the movie, also makes a cameo appearance in the video.

== Live performances ==
On February 17, 2017, Fat Joe, Remy Ma and Ty Dolla $ign performed "Money $howers" on Jimmy Kimmel Live!. Joe and Ma performed the song with Sevyn Streeter (who sang Ty's verse) on The Wendy Williams Show on March 3, 2017.

== Charts ==
Chart (2017)	Peak position
US Bubbling Under Hot 100 (Billboard)	10
US Hot R&B/Hip-Hop Songs (Billboard)	46
US R&B/Hip-Hop Airplay (Billboard)	14

== Release history ==
Region	Date	Format	Label	Ref.
United States	November 11, 2016	Digital download	Terror Squad; Entertainment One	
United States	December 6, 2016	Rhythmic contemporary radio	Terror Squad; Entertainment One	
