= True Story (album) =

Studio album by Terror Squad
- Released: July 27, 2004
- Recorded: 2003–2004
- Genre: Hip-hop
- Length: 47:17
- Label: Terror Squad; SRC; Universal
- Producer: Beat Novacane; Scram Jones; Cool & Dre; Scott Storch; StreetRunner; Emile; Davel "Bo" McKenzie; Lord Finesse; Buckwild; Armageddon; LV

Terror Squad chronology
The Album (1999)	True Story (2004)

Singles from True Story
- 1. "Lean Back" Released: June 1, 2004; 2. "Take Me Home" Released: September 28, 2004

Professional ratings
Review scores
Source	Rating
AllMusic	3.5/5 stars
HipHopDX	4/5 stars
RapReviews	7.5/10
Rolling Stone	3/5 stars
The Situation	5/5 stars
USA Today	3/4 stars
Vibe	4/5 stars

True Story is the second and final studio album by the hip-hop group Terror Squad. It was released on July 27, 2004 through Steve Rifkind's SRC Records (Street Records Corporation), Universal Records, and Fat Joe's Terror Squad Entertainment. It includes the single "Lean Back", which reached number 1 on the Billboard Hot 100. The group's line up for this recording was Fat Joe, Remy Ma, Armageddon, Prospect and Tony Sunshine.

The late rappers Big L and Big Pun appear together on the song titled "Bring 'Em Back". Big Pun was originally a member of the group and some of his verses are reprised on this track.

Jessy Terrero and Raul Conde directed the music video for "Take Me Home" and filmed it at a mansion in Hollywood Hills, Los Angeles.

== Commercial performance ==
The album reached number 7 on the US Billboard 200, selling 90,000 units in its first week.

== Track listing ==
Credits adapted from the album's liner notes.

No.	Title	Writer(s)	Producer(s)	Length
1.	"Nothing's Gonna Stop Me" (Tony Sunshine and Fat Joe)	Andre Lyon; Joseph Cartagena; Khaled Khaled; Anthony Hester	Beat Novacane	2:42
2.	"Yeah, Yeah, Yeah" (Remy Ma and Fat Joe)	Reminisce Smith; Cartagena; Marc Shemer; Lalo Schifrin; Mike Curb	Scram Jones	3:07
3.	"Hum Drum" (Remy Ma, Prospect and Armageddon)	Smith; Richard Perez; John Eaddy; Lyon; Marcello Valenzano; Laurence Creme; Kevin Godley	Cool & Dre	4:11
4.	"Lean Back" (Fat Joe and Remy Ma)	Cartagena; Smith; Scott Storch	Scott Storch	4:07
5.	"Take Me Home" (Remy Ma, Armageddon, Fat Joe and Dre)	Smith; Eaddy; Lyon; Cartagena; Valenzano; Nicholas Warwar; Brenda Russell	StreetRunner; Cool & Dre	3:30
6.	"Streets of NY" (Remy Ma and Tony Sunshine)	Smith; Lyon; Emile Haynie; Walter Marks; Ruth Copeland; Dick Wagner	Emile	3:14
7.	"Bring 'Em Back" (Fat Joe featuring Big L and Big Pun)	Christopher Rios; Lamont Coleman; Cartagena; LeRoy Bell; Casey James; Robert Hall; Davel McKenzie	Lord Finesse; Davel "Bo" McKenzie	4:26
8.	"Yes Dem to Def" (Fat Joe)	Cartagena; Tom Bahler; Ray Brown; Quincy Jones	Beat Novacane	3:49
9.	"Pass Away" (Tony Sunshine and Armageddon featuring Tha Realest)	Lyon; Eaddy; Anthony Best	Buckwild	3:52
10.	"Let Them Things Go" (Fat Joe and Remy Ma featuring Dre and Young Selah)	Cartagena; Smith; Lyon; Valenzano; Franzwa Jones	Cool & Dre	4:04
11.	"Thunder in the Air" (Prospect)	Perez; Eaddy	Armageddon	3:18
12.	"Terror Era" (Remy Ma and Fat Joe)	Smith; Cartagena; Levar Coppin	LV	3:06
Total length:				47:17

Leftover tracks

- "NY State of Mind" (Fat Joe and Remy Ma featuring Cam'ron)

Sample credits

- "Nothing's Gonna Stop Me" contains excerpts from "Nothing Can Stop Me", written by Anthony Hester, as performed by Marilyn McCoo and Billy Davis Jr.
- "Yeah, Yeah, Yeah" contains excerpts from "Burning Bridges", written by Lalo Schifrin and Mike Curb, as performed by The Mike Curb Congregation.
- "Hum Drum" contains excerpts from "The Dean and I", written by Laurence Creme and Kevin Godley, as performed by 10cc.
- "Take Me Home" contains excerpts from "If Only for One Night", written by Brenda Russell, as performed by Roberta Flack and Peabo Bryson.
- "Streets of NY" contains interpolations of "The Hardest Thing I've Ever Had to Do", written by Walter Marks.
- "Streets of NY" contains excerpts from "Take Me to Baltimore", written by Ruth Copeland and Dick Wagner, as performed by Ruth Copeland.
- "Bring 'Em Back" contains excerpts from "Ask Billy (They Tell Me)", written by LeRoy Bell and Casey James, as performed by Bell and James.
- "Yes Them to Def" contains interpolations from "Soul Saga", written by Tom Bahler, Ray Brown, and Quincy Jones.

== Charts ==
Chart performance
Chart (2004)	Peak position
Canadian Albums (Nielsen SoundScan)	59
French Albums (SNEP)	182
UK Albums (OCC)	149
UK R&B Albums (OCC)	38
US Billboard 200	7
US Top R&B/Hip-Hop Albums (Billboard)	1
