= Lean Back =

2004 single by Terror Squad

Single by Terror Squad featuring Fat Joe and Remy

from the album True Story
- B-side: "Yeah Yeah Yeah"
- Released: June 1, 2004
- Studio: Jerusalem (Miami, Florida)
- Genre: Hip hop
- Length: 4:07
- Label: Universal; SRC; Island
- Songwriters: Joseph Cartagena; Reminisce Smith; Scott Storch
- Producer: Scott Storch

Terror Squad singles chronology
"Yeah Yeah Yeah" (2004)	"Lean Back" (2004)	"Take Me Home" (2004)

Fat Joe singles chronology
"Not Your Average Joe" (2004)	"Lean Back" (2004)	"New York" (2004)

Music video
- "Lean Back" on YouTube

"Lean Back" is a song by American hip hop group Terror Squad. It was released as the second single from their second studio album, True Story, on June 1, 2004. An uptempo hip hop song built for the club environment, it contains vocal performances from group members Fat Joe and Remy Ma (credited as Remy) and production from Scott Storch. It topped the US Billboard Hot 100 for three weeks, starting on August 21, 2004, and topped the Billboard Hot R&B/Hip-Hop Singles & Tracks chart for seven weeks. Worldwide, the song reached the top 20 in several other countries, including Denmark, where it peaked at number five.

== Critical reception ==
Jason Birchmeier of AllMusic called "Lean Back" "a perfect club-ready duet between Fat Joe and Remy that boasts a trademark Scott Storch beat and a memorable singalong hook and dance-along step". Vibe called the song a "summer classic". In 2008, the song was ranked at number 55 on VH1's 100 Greatest Songs of Hip Hop.

== Music video ==
Fat Joe described the dance in the video as throwing back the right shoulder to the beat of the song. Kevin Hart, Shea Davis, Erica Mena, Tego Calderon, Charlie Rock LD, N.O.R.E., Pistol Pete, DJ Khaled, Dre, and Lil Jon made cameo appearances in the video.

== Remixes ==
The official remixed version of the song, featuring Lil Jon, Eminem, and Mase is available on Fat Joe's 2005 album All or Nothing and Lil Jon & the East Side Boyz's Crunk Juice remix disc. The official remix is more uptempo and contains a new beat with a crunk–like feel to it. However, there are two different versions of the remix. The All or Nothing version, the main remix, features an additional verse by Remy and was released in July 2004. The Crunk Juice version features Lil Jon's vocals throughout the song, omitting Remy's verse. On both versions, Mase's verse is in line with his then-clean style of rapping (as heard on his 2004 album Welcome Back).

Fat Joe also released a remix in tribute to his Puerto Rican ancestry, featuring Tego Calderón and Tony Touch. Other remixes of the song are performed by Chamillionaire, on The Mixtape Messiah titled "Body Rock", Lil Wayne, Max B, Jadakiss, U.S.D.A., and G-Unit. Also, mashup artist Girl Talk layered "Lean Back" over Spacehog's "In the Meantime" in his 2010 album All Day. Houston rapper Lil' Flip did a freestyle over the song as a diss towards Atlanta rapper T.I.

== Track listings ==
US 12-inch single

A1. "Lean Back" (clean) – 4:12
A2. "Lean Back" (instrumental) – 4:12
B1. "Lean Back" (dirty) – 4:11
B2. "Lean Back" (acappella) – 4:01

UK 12-inch single

A1. "Lean Back" (explicit) – 4:07
B1. "Yeah Yeah Yeah" – 3:07
B2. "Lean Back" (instrumental) – 4:12

UK and Australian CD single

1. "Lean Back" (clean) – 4:11
2. "Lean Back" (explicit) – 4:07
3. "Yeah Yeah Yeah" – 3:07
4. "Lean Back" (video)

European CD single

1. "Lean Back" – 4:07
2. "Yeah Yeah Yeah" – 3:07

== Credits and personnel ==
Credits are taken from the True Story album notes.

Studios

- Recorded at Jerusalem Studios (Miami, Florida)
- Mixed at The Hit Factory Criteria (Miami, Florida)
- Mastered at Sterling Sound (New York City)

Personnel

- Fat Joe – writing (as Joseph Cartagena), vocals, executive production
- Remy – writing (as Reminisce Smith), vocals
- Scott Storch – writing, production
- Drop – recording
- Supa Engineer Duro – mixing
- Chris Gehringer – mastering

== Charts ==
=== Weekly charts ===
Chart (2004–2005)	Peak position
Australia (ARIA)	44
Australian Urban (ARIA)	9
Belgium (Ultratop 50 Flanders)	40
Belgium (Ultratip Bubbling Under Wallonia)	6
Canada CHR/Pop Top 30 (Radio & Records)	12
Denmark (Tracklisten)	5
Germany (GfK)	46
Ireland (IRMA)	40
Italy (FIMI)	25
Netherlands (Dutch Top 40)	10
Netherlands (Single Top 100)	14
New Zealand (Recorded Music NZ)	11
Scottish Singles Sales (Official Charts)	44
Switzerland (Schweizer Hitparade)	28
UK Singles (Official Charts)	24
UK Hip Hop/R&B (Official Charts)	3
US Billboard Hot 100	1
US Hot R&B/Hip-Hop Singles & Tracks (Billboard)	1
US Hot Rap Tracks (Billboard)	1
US Mainstream Top 40 (Billboard)	13
US Rhythmic Top 40 (Billboard)	1

=== Year-end charts ===
Chart (2004)	Position
Netherlands (Dutch Top 40)	100
UK Urban (Music Week)	2
US Billboard Hot 100	10
US Hot R&B/Hip-Hop Singles & Tracks (Billboard)	5
US Hot Rap Tracks (Billboard)	1
US Mainstream Top 40 (Billboard)	64
US Rhythmic Top 40 (Billboard)	7

Chart (2005)	Position
US Rhythmic Top 40 (Billboard)	83

=== Decade-end charts ===
Chart (2000–2009)	Position
US Billboard Hot 100	45
US Hot R&B/Hip-Hop Songs (Billboard)	22

== Certifications ==
Region	Certification	Certified units/sales
Brazil (Pro-Música Brasil)	Gold	30,000^{‡}
Germany (BVMI)	Gold	150,000^{‡}
United Kingdom (BPI)	Gold	400,000^{‡}
United States (RIAA)	Gold	500,000^{*}
United States (RIAA) Mastertone	Gold	500,000^{*}
^{*} Sales figures based on certification alone.^{‡} Sales+streaming figures based on certification alone.

== Release history ==
Region	Date	Format(s)	Label(s)	Ref.
United States	June 1, 2004	Rhythmic contemporary; urban radio	Universal; SRC	
United States	July 26, 2004	Contemporary hit radio	Universal; SRC	
United Kingdom	October 4, 2004	12-inch vinyl; CD	Universal; SRC; Island	
Australia	October 18, 2004	CD	Universal	

== See also ==
- List of Billboard Hot 100 number ones of 2004
- List of number-one R&B singles of 2004 (U.S.)
