= I'm Around =

Mixtape by Remy Ma
- Released: October 31, 2014
- Recorded: August–October 2014
- Genre: Hip hop
- Length: 36:21
- Label: Remynisce Music
- Producers: Hosted By DJ Khaled; Remy Ma (executive producer); Certifyd; Ron Browz; Boy Boy; Tie Stick; Sean C & LV; Jason Gilbert; Buckwild; Trackz; Ted Smooth; J Notes

Remy Ma chronology
BlasRemy (2008)	I'm Around (2014)	Plata O Plomo (2017)

I'm Around is the fifth mixtape by American rapper Remy Ma. The mixtape was released on October 31, 2014. I'm Around features a guest appearance from Remy Ma's husband, rapper Papoose, and DJ Khaled. Production derives from Certifyd, J Notes, and Ted Smooth - among others. The album is the rapper's first official post-prison musical project

== Background ==
Remy Ma recorded the album shortly after her prison release August 1, 2014. After releasing numerous remixes to popular 2014 hip hop songs, Remy Ma decided to keep the features to a minimum, speaking of the release of her project Remy Ma stated to MTV News "They're gonna get all me,....“Everybody was like, you gotta reach out to people...I would have loved to do it, but I've been gone for so long, that I just wanted to give the people me."

== Reception ==
I'm Around received generally favorable reviews from music critics. Henry Mansell of XXL praised Remy Ma's return to recording, describing her flow on "Gangsta Bitch" as "sharp" and "on point" and highlighting the mixtape's experimentation with different sounds and production styles. He also praised "Black Love" featuring Papoose and "I Run New York", while criticizing "I'm Around" and "Wassup Tho" as among the project's more passable tracks. Mansell concluded that the 12-track, 41-minute mixtape provided enough material to satisfy interest in her return while leaving room for her to explore further on subsequent releases.

The Fader's Matthew Trammell noted that the mixtape represented Remy Ma's return to music following her release from prison, highlighting its production by Ron Browz and Ted Smooth and its feature from Papoose. Complex similarly characterized I'm Around as her first project following her release and highlighted its 12-song track list, DJ Khaled's introduction, Papoose's appearance as the sole featured artist, and production.

== Track listing ==
Credits adapted from the DatPiff website.

No.	Title	Producer	Length
1.	"Intro" (featuring DJ Khaled)	Certifyd	3:58
2.	"I'm Around"	Ron Browz	2:34
3.	"White Benz"	Certifyd	3:41
4.	"Dying To Be Me"	Boy Boy	3:46
5.	"Gangsta Bitch"	Tie Stick	3:36
6.	"Wassup Tho"	Sean C & LV	3:55
7.	"Erthang Fake"	Certifyd	3:27
8.	"Go In Go Off"	Jason Gilbert	3:08
9.	"WSBH"	Buckwild	3:12
10.	"Alwayz"	Trackz	2:38
11.	"Black Love" (featuring Papoose)	Ted Smooth	5:16
12.	"I Run New York"	J Notes	1:38
