= Terror Squad (group) =

American hip-hop collective

- Origin: The Bronx, New York City, U.S.
- Genre: Hip-hop
- Years active: 1998–2006
- Labels: SRC; Universal; Atlantic
- Past members: Fat Joe; Big Pun; Cuban Link; Triple Seis; Prospect; Armageddon; Remy Ma; Tony Sunshine; DJ Khaled; Cool & Dre

Terror Squad was an American hip-hop collective established in 1998. Based in the Bronx in New York City, the members of Terror Squad were first heard on member Fat Joe's albums Jealous One's Envy and Don Cartagena. Terror Squad released its debut album, Terror Squad: The Album, in 1999, with its first major hit "Whatcha Gon' Do", credited mostly to Big Pun, who died of a heart attack in 2000. After Big Pun's death, his longtime partners Cuban Link and Triple Seis left the group and were subsequently replaced by Remy Martin (later known as Remy Ma) and Tony Sunshine. In 2004, their song "Lean Back" peaked at No. 1 on the Billboard Hot 100.

== History ==
Joseph Cartagena aka Fat Joe and Felix Delgado aka Charlie Rock LD were founding members of the Terror Squad. In 1995, some of the members of Terror Squad debuted as a group on Fat Joe's album Jealous One's Envy, in addition to appearing on Big Pun's Capital Punishment and Joe's Don Cartagena LP. Terror Squad, in its debut album Terror Squad: The Album, consisted of rappers Fat Joe, Big Pun (Christopher Rios), Cuban Link (also named Felix Delgado), Prospect (Richard Perez), Armageddon (John Eaddy), and Triple Seis (Sammy Garcia).

As the group was on hiatus following Pun's death in 2000, most of its former members fell into obscurity. Founder Fat Joe would have the most successful solo career among all the former members. The group reunited in 2004 and released their second album, True Story. It included the summer club hit "Lean Back", produced by Scott Storch. It peaked at number one on the Billboard Hot 100 and 24 in the UK. A remix to "Lean Back" featured Lil Jon, Mase and Eminem was released on Fat Joe's 2005 album All or Nothing. Although the album failed to spawn other hit singles, Fat Joe and Remy, who contributed the vocals to "Lean Back", went on to release high-selling solo albums in 2006.

Terror Squad signed to Koch Records that next year. Apart from the three new members, DJ Khaled and Cool & Dre are retained as regular crew along with Tony Sunshine.

On April 9, 2007, it was announced and confirmed that Remy Ma parted ways with Terror Squad after the commercial disappointment of her debut album, There's Something About Remy: Based on a True Story.

== Members ==
- Fat Joe (Joe Cartagena)
- Big Pun (Christopher Rios) (deceased)
- Tony Sunshine (Antonio Cruz)
- Cuban Link (Felix Delgado)
- Armageddon (John Eaddy)
- Prospect (Richard Perez)
- Triple Seis (Sammy Garcia)
- Remy Ma (Reminisce Mackie)
- DJ Khaled (Khaled Mohamed Khaled)
- Charlie Rock LD (Felix Delgado) (deceased)
- Cool & Dre (Marcello "Cool" Valenzano and Andre "Dre" Lyon)

== Discography ==
=== Albums ===
List of albums, with selected chart positions
| Title | Album details | Peak chart positions | |
| Title | Album details | US | US R&B |
|---|---|---|---|
| Terror Squad: The Album | Released: September 21, 1999; Label: Atlantic (83232); Format: CD, LP, digital download | 22 | 4 |
| True Story | Released: July 27, 2004; Label: Universal (000280602); Format: CD, LP, digital download | 7 | 1 |

=== Singles ===
List of singles, with selected chart positions and certifications
| Title | Year | Peak chart positions | | | | Certifications | Album |
| Title | Year | US | US R&B | US Rap | AUS | Certifications | Album |
|---|---|---|---|---|---|---|---|
| "Whatcha Gon' Do?" (performed by Big Pun) | 1999 | — | — | — | — | | Terror Squad: The Album |
| "Tell Me What U Want" (performed by Fat Joe, Armageddon, Cuban Link and Tony Sunshine) | 1999 | — | — | — | — | | Terror Squad: The Album |
| "Yeah, Yeah, Yeah" (performed by Remy Ma and Fat Joe) | 2004 | — | 75 | — | — | | True Story |
| "Lean Back" (performed by Fat Joe and Remy Ma) | 2004 | 1 | 1 | 1 | 44 | RIAA: Gold | True Story |
| "Take Me Home" (performed by Fat Joe, Dre, Remy Ma and Armageddon) | 2004 | 62 | 22 | 19 | — | | True Story |
"—" denotes a recording that did not chart or was not released in that territory.
