= Ron Browz production discography =

The following is a list of songs produced, co-produced and remixed by American hip hop record producer Ron Browz.

== Singles produced ==
- 1998
  - "Ebonics" (Big L)
  - "Size 'Em Up" (Big L)
- 2003
  - "Blow It Out" (Ludacris)
- 2005
  - "I'll Whip Ya Head Boy" (50 Cent featuring Young Buck)
- 2006
  - "Help" (Lloyd Banks featuring Keri Hilson)
  - "Bring It Back" (Jae Millz featuring Jadakiss)
- 2008
  - "The Good Stuff" (Jim Jones featuring NOE)
  - "Pop Champagne" (Jim Jones and Ron Browz featuring Juelz Santana)
  - "Arab Money" (Busta Rhymes featuring Ron Browz)
  - "Jumping (Out the Window)" (Ron Browz)
- 2009
  - "Rotate" (C-N-N featuring Busta Rhymes & Ron Browz)
- 2010
  - "Man Down" (Ja Rule)
  - "Need More Bottles" (Jamie Drastik)
- 2014
  - "Park Day" (Zumo Kollie)

== 2000 ==
=== Big L - The Big Picture ===
02. "Ebonics"
03. "Size 'Em Up"
07. "The Heist"
11. "Casualties of a Dice Game"

== 2001 ==
=== Nas - Stillmatic ===
02. "Ether"

== 2002 ==
=== Fat Joe - Loyalty ===
13. "We Run This Shit"

=== Nas - God's Son ===
04. "Last Real Nigga Alive"

== 2003 ==
=== Ludacris - Chicken-n-Beer ===
02. "Blow It Out"
18. "Blow It Out (Remix)" (featuring 50 Cent)

=== DMX - Grand Champ ===
10. "Fuck Y'all"

=== Lil' Kim - La Bella Mafia ===
17. "What's The Word" (Japanese Bonus Track)

== 2004 ==
=== Snoop Dogg - R&G (Rhythm & Gangsta): The Masterpiece ===
14. "Oh No" (featuring 50 Cent)

=== Lloyd Banks - The Hunger for More ===
02. "Playboy"

== 2005 ==
=== Black Market Militia - Black Market Militia ===
- 11. "Paintbrush" (featuring Young Buck)

=== 50 Cent - Get Rich or Die Tryin' (soundtrack) ===
- 18. "I'll Whip Ya Head Boy" (featuring Young Buck)

=== Tony Yayo - Thoughts of a Predicate Felon ===
- 14. "G-Shit"

=== Funkmaster Flex - Car Show Tour ===
- 7. "Bring It Back" (featuring Jae Millz & Jadakiss)

=== Papoose - Menace II Society (Part 2) ===
- 11. "New Era"

== 2006 ==
=== Joe Budden - Mood Muzik 2: Can It Get Any Worse? ===
03. "Old School Mouse"
10. "Young Niggaz"

=== Webstar - Webstar Presents: Caught in the Web ===
01. "I Just Came To Dance" (featuring Young B.)
02. "Don't Stop" (featuring Young B., Ron Browz, Severe and T-Rex)
04. "In My Video" (featuring Young B.)
05. "Get Higher" (featuring Young B. & Young We)

=== Lloyd Banks - Rotten Apple ===
03. "Playboy 2"
07. "Help" (featuring Keri Hilson)

=== Oshy - Da Life of a Singer ===
10. "Give Me What I'm Asking 4"

=== Lil Wayne & Juelz Santana - Blow: The 'I Can't Feel My Face' Prequel ===
- 10. "Rewind"

== 2007 ==
=== Lumidee - Unexpected ===
11. "You Got Me" (featuring N.O.R.E.)

=== Cashis - The County Hound EP ===
07. "Thoughts Of Suicide"

=== Lake - American Rat Killer ===
02. "American Rat"
06. "No Happy Ending"
07. "My Hood"

=== Ron Browz, Kartier, & The Heatmakerz - This Is Crack Music ===
07. "Go Girl"
08. "Like That"
13. "Wishing On A Star"

=== Jae Millz - Zone Out Season V. 1 ===
18. "Horror Movie" (featuring Al Doe & Remy Ma)

=== Remy Ma - PunishHer ===
00. "Fresh"

== 2008 ==
=== Ron Browz - The Wonder Years ===
01. "The Co-Sign" (Performed by Jadakiss & Gravy)
02. "Shoot Me A Fair One" (Performed by Papoose)
03. "Old School Mouse" (Performed by Joe Budden)
04. "I’m Hollywood" (Performed by Ron Browz)
05. "Horror" (Performed by Jae Millz)
06. "What They Want" (Performed by Stack Bundles)
07. "Nah" (Performed by J-Hood)
08. "Drama" (Performed by Loaded Lux)
09. "Young Niggaz" (Performed by Joe Budden)
10. "Streets" (Performed by Ransom & Dj Clue)
11. "Da Goons" (Performed by Traffik)
12. "Act Stupid" (Performed by Ransom, Stack Bundles & Bynoe)
13. "Ride Out" (Performed by Skyzoo)
14. "Don’t Move" (Performed by Murda Mook, Stack Bundles & T-Rex)
15. "This Is It" (Performed by Harlem’s Cash)
16. "Crack Music" (Performed by Arsonist, Ron Browz & Karty)
17. "Skates On" (Performed by Ron Browz)
18. "The Can’t Wait" (Performed by Shakez & Cardi)
19. "What’s Flow" (Performed by Ron Browz)

=== G-Unit - T.O.S: Terminate on Sight ===
01. "Straight Outta Southside"
16. "Money Makes the World Go Round"

=== Team Blackout - Lights Out ===
12. J5 On 'Em

=== Killer Mike - Ghetto Extraordinary ===
08. Chose Me (featuring S.L. Jones & Scar)

=== Jim Jones - The Good Stuff - Single ===
00. "The Good Stuff" (featuring NOE)

== 2009 ==
=== C-N-N - Channel 10 ===
03. "Rotate" (featuring Ron Browz & Busta Rhymes)

=== Jim Jones - Pray IV Reign ===
04. "How to Be a Boss" (featuring Ludacris & NOE)
14. "Pop Champagne" (with Ron Browz featuring Juelz Santana)
15. "Rain" (featuring Rell, NOE & Starr)

=== Bow Wow - New Jack City II ===
02. "What They Call Me" (featuring Ron Browz & Nelly) (Co-produced by Jermaine Dupri)

=== Lloyd Banks - 4-30-09 ===
05. "Luv Witch Ya Boy" (featuring Ron Browz)

=== Busta Rhymes - Back on My B.S. ===
02. "Give Em What They Askin For"
07. "Arab Money" (featuring Ron Browz)

=== R. Kelly - The Demo Tape ===
03. "Club to a Bedroom" (featuring Ron Browz)

=== Nicki Minaj - Beam Me Up Scotty ===
02. "I Get Crazy" (featuring Lil Wayne)
04. "Kill Da DJ"

=== Fat Joe - Jealous Ones Still Envy 2 (J.O.S.E. 2) ===
01. "Winding On Me" (featuring Ron Browz & Lil Wayne)

== 2010 ==
=== Ron Browz - EtherBoy (shelved) ===
00. "Pop Champagne"
00. "Jumping (Out the Window)"
00. "I Promise" (featuring Busta Rhymes)
00. "Simple Man" (featuring Keri Hilson & Juelz Santana)
00. "20 Dollarz"
00. "Wheels Fall Off" (featuring Lloyd Banks)
00. "She's What I Like" (featuring Bobby Valentino)
00. "She's My Homie" (featuring Oshy)
00. "Got Curved"
00. "Undress You"
00. "20 Dollars (Remix) (featuring Mase, Nicki Minaj, Shawty Lo & OJ Da Juiceman)
00. "Cheese and Crackers"
00. "She's A Biker" (featuring Foxy Brown)

=== Ron Browz - Etherlibrium ===
01. "Etherlibrium Intro" (featuring Oshy)
02. "Wishing On a Star" (featuring Maino, Fred Da God & Malaika Russel)
03. "In a Zone"
04. "Don’t Breathe It"
05. "What Up Bro Remix" (featuring Red Cafe)
06. "Good Morning" (featuring J.R. Writer)
07. "You Can Blossom"
08. "Put ya Hands Up"
09. "Winded"
10. Skit
11. "Slow Motion"
12. "Start Off Walking"
13. "Halftime 2010"
14. "Wanna Be You"
15. "I Swear" (featuring Sharp A Don)
16. "Etherboy Allstars" (featuring Pretty Boy Maloy, Mone & M5)

== 2013 ==
=== Papoose - The Nacirema Dream ===
- 03. "Mother Ghetto"
- 17. "Get At Me" (featuring Ron Browz)

== 2014 ==
=== Mani Miles - TBA ===
- 00. "Bars" (featuring Cassidy & Murda Mook)

== 2015 ==
=== Papoose - You Can't Stop Destiny ===
- 01. "The Bank"
- 05. "Michael Jackson" (featuring Remy Ma & Ty Dolla $ign)

=== Method Man - The Meth Lab ===
- 03. "Straight Gutta" (featuring Redman, Hanz On & Streetlife)

== 2016 ==
=== Smoke DZA - George Kush Da Button (Don't Pass Trump the Blunt) ===
- 04. "Where the Weed"

== 2025 ==
=== Big L - Harlem's Finest: Return of the King ===
- 16. "Put The Mic Down" (featuring Fergie Baby & Party Arty)

== 2026 ==
=== AZ - Doe or Die III ===
- 02. "No Need For Lactose"
- 13. "We Made It (Outro)"

== Miscellaneous ==
- Amerie
  - "After Everything"
- Bradhurst
  - "What Your Man Don't Know" (featuring Ron Browz)
- Cardan
  - "Heading To The Telly" (featuring Ron Browz)
- Jae Millz
  - "Who"
- Juelz Santana
  - "I Wanna Bone" (featuring Un Kasa & Sen City)
- Knocka
  - "Heavy in The Club" (featuring Ron Browz & Young Truth)
  - "Say They Ballin'" (featuring Ron Browz & Nefu Da Don)
- Mase
  - "Thinkin About You"
- Q Da Kid
  - "I Talk Money" (featuring Ron Browz)
- SF
  - "Sak Pase" (featuring Ron Browz)
- Traffik
  - "Goonz"
