= Ron Browz discography =

- Extended plays: 2
- Compilation albums: 1
- Singles: 4
- Music videos: 8

This is the discography of Ron Browz, an American hip hop record producer.

== Albums ==
=== Studio albums ===
List of studio albums, with selected chart positions and certifications
Title	Album details	Peak chart positions		
Title	Album details	US	US R&B	US Rap
Etherlibrium	Released: July 20, 2010; Label: Ether Boy; Format: MD, LP	—	—	—

=== Compilation albums ===
Title
The Wonder Years
- Released: May 6, 2008
- Label: Trust Family
- Format: Digital download

=== Miscellaneous ===
List of miscellaneous albums, with selected information
Title	Album details	Notes
Etherboy	Released: December 29, 2009 (US) (Shelved); Label: Ether Boy, Universal Motown; Format: Bootleg, digital download	Originally meant to be released as Ron Browz debut studio album, however it was shelved before its official release date due to Ron Browz parting ways from Universal Motown due to business disagreements.

== EPs ==
Title
Timeless
- Released: December 22, 2009
- Label: Ether Boy
- Format: Digital download
Fly Away
- Released: February 14, 2012
- Label: Ether Boy
- Format: Digital download

== Mixtapes ==
Ron Browz mixtapes and details
Title	Mixtape details
Browz Through This	Released: 2006; Hosted by DJ L
The Christening	Released: October 27, 2011; Hosted by Himself as Etherboy; Retail Mixtape
Stranded On Lenox	Released: August 29, 2012; Retail Mixtape
Ron Browz Instrumentals Vol. 1	Released: November 23, 2012; Retail Mixtape
Blvck Circus	Released: May 21, 2013; Retail Mixtape
The Christening 2	Released: January 29, 2014; Retail Mixtape

== Singles ==
=== As lead artist ===
List of singles, with selected chart positions and certifications, showing year released and album name
Title	Year	Peak chart positions			Certifications	Album
Title	Year	US	US R&B	US Rap	Certifications	Album
"Pop Champagne" (with Jim Jones, featuring Juelz Santana)	2008	22	3	3	RIAA: Gold	Pray IV Reign
"Jumping (Out the Window)"	2008	110	35	14		non-album single
"20 Dollars"	2009	—	—	—		Timeless
"I'm Smacked" (featuring Red Café)	2010	—	—	—		non-album singles
"Write Cha Name" (featuring Papoose)	2011	—	—	—		non-album singles
"Rollin" (featuring P.A.P.I.)	2013	—	—	—		non-album singles
"Stay In My Lane" (featuring Karty)	2013	—	—	—		non-album singles
"Pink Soda"	2013	—	—	—		non-album singles
"She Ain't Nothin' to F Wit"	2014	—	—	—		non-album singles
"She Don't Like Me"	2014	—	—	—		TBA
"—" denotes a recording that did not chart.

=== As featured artist ===
Year	Song	U.S. Hot 100	U.S. R&B	U.S. Rap	Album
2008	"Arab Money" (Busta Rhymes feat. Ron Browz)	86	31	9	Back on My B.S.
2009	"Rotate" (Capone-N-Noreaga feat. Busta Rhymes & Ron Browz)	—	115	—	Channel 10
2009	"Heels On" (Slim feat. Ron Browz & Deezo)	—	—	—	Love's Crazy

== Guest appearances ==
- 2008: "Arab Money" (Busta Rhymes featuring Ron Browz)
- 2008: "Arab Money (Remix)" (Busta Rhymes featuring Ron Browz, Diddy, Swizz Beatz, T-Pain, Akon & Lil Wayne)
- 2008: "Arab Money (Remix Pt. II)" (Busta Rhymes featuring Ron Browz, Rick Ross, Reek Da Villian, Spliff Star, N.O.R.E. & Red Cafe)
- 2008: "Arab Money (Remix Pt. III)" (Busta Rhymes featuring Juelz Santana, Jim Jones & Jadakiss)
- 2008: "Feel Free" (Ricky Blaze featuring Red Cafe & Nicki Minaj)
- 2008: "Winding on Me" (Fat Joe featuring Ron Browz & Lil Wayne)
- 2009: "Fill It Up (VIP)" (Brie Beauty featuring Ron Browz, Bow Wow & Hugo)
- 2009: "We Want In" (Busta Rhymes featuring Flipmode Squad, Spliff Star & Show Money)
- 2009: "She's A Killah" (Ghostface Killah featuring Ron Browz)
- 2009: "Heels On (Remix)" (Slim (of 112) featuring Ron Browz & D aka Deezo)
- 2009: "Rotate" (C-N-N featuring Busta Rhymes)
- 2009: "Rotate (Remix)" (C-N-N featuring Swizz Beatz, Busta Rhymes & Jadakiss)
- 2009: "Rotate (Champion Hoodie Remix)" (C-N-N featuring Maino, Uncle Murda, Joell Ortiz, Charlie Hustle, Spliff Star, Hell Rell, D.O.E., Tru Life, Mike Beck & Max B)
- 2009: "Champagne Red Lights (Remix)" (O'Neal McKnight featuring Ron Browz & Busta Rhymes)
- 2009: "Heavy In The Club" (Knocka featuring Ron Browz & Young Truth)
- 2009: "I Talk Money" (Q Da Kid featuring Ron Browz)
- 2009: "Skatez On" (Lumidee featuring Boogie Black, Ron Browz & DJ Webstar)
- 2009: "What They Call Me Big Time" (Bow Wow featuring Nelly & Jermaine Dupri)
- 2009: "Luv Wit Ya Boy" (Lloyd Banks featuring Ron Browz)
- 2009: "I Love My Money" (Pryme featuring Ron Browz)
- 2010: "Strippin' In The Club" (DJ Diamond Kuts featuring Ron Browz, Latif & Nicki Minaj)
- 2010: "Say They Ballin'" (Knocka featuring Ron Browz & Nefu Da Don)
- 2010: "Sak Pase" (Sf (Spark Flame) featuring Ron Browz)
- 2011: "Say They Ballin' (Remix)" (Knocka featuring Ron Browz, Mann & YG)
- 2012: "Uptown Boy (Remix)" (P. Swag featuring Ron Browz)
- 2012: "She's Hot" (Dougie Cash featuring Ron Browz)
- 2012: "Party Over Here" (Nino Man featuring Ron Browz)
- 2013: "U Can Do It" (J-Hood featuring Project Pat, Lil' Flip, Torch & Ron Brownz)
- 2013: "Get At Me" (Papoose featuring Ron Brownz)
- 2013: "I Got Tha Ca$h" (Al Boogs featuring Ron Brownz)

== Music videos ==
Year	Title	Album	Director
2009	"Jumping (Out the Window)"	Etherboy	Mike Hand & Mary Evelyn McGough
2009	"Gimme 20 Dollars"	Timeless EP	Monstar Films
2013	"Rollin" (featuring P.A.P.I.)	non-album single	The Last American B-Boy

=== Featured music videos ===
Year	Title	Album	Director	Artist
2008	"Pop Champagne"	Pray IV Reign	RAGE & CAPO	Jim Jones feat. Ron Browz & Juelz Santana
2008	"Arab Money"	Back on My B.S.	Rik Cordero	Busta Rhymes feat. Ron Browz
2009	"Rotate"	Channel 10	Rik Cordero	C-N-N feat. Busta Rhymes & Ron Browz
2009	"Arab Money (Remix)"		Rik Cordero	Busta Rhymes feat. Ron Browz, Diddy, Swizz Beatz, Akon & Lil Wayne
2009	"Heels On"	Love's Crazy	Dorian Forbes	Slim feat. Ron Browz & Deezo
2009	"I Love My Money"		TBD	Pryme feat. Ron Browz
