= Papoose discography =

American rapper discography

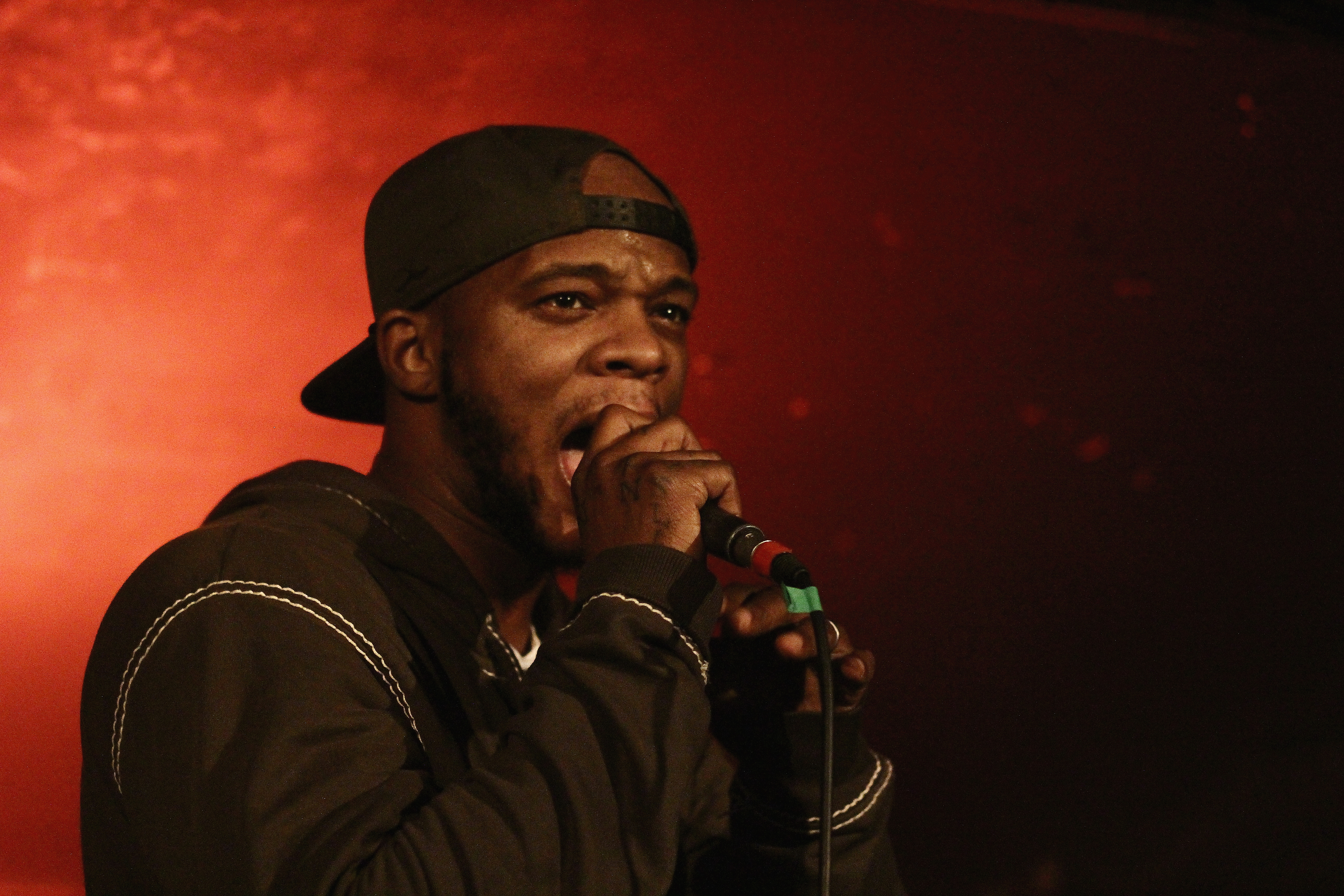
- Studio albums: 4
- Singles: 11
- Mixtapes: 29
- Guest appearances: 29

The discography of Papoose, an American rapper signed to his own label Honor B4 Money Records and formerly Jive Records, consists of four studio albums, 29 mixtapes, and eight singles.

== Albums ==
=== Studio albums ===
List of albums, with selected chart positions
Title	Album details	Peak chart positions		
Title	Album details	US	US R&B	US Rap
The Nacirema Dream	Released: March 26, 2013; Label: Honor B4 Money Records / Fontana Records; Format: CD, digital download	97	13	8
You Can't Stop Destiny	Released: July 17, 2015; Label: Honorable Records; Format: CD, digital download	130	28	16
Underrated	Released: February 15, 2019; Label: Honorable Records / EMPIRE; Format: CD, digital download	—	—	—
Endangered Species	Released: October 9, 2020; Label: Honorable Records / Worldstar Distro; Format: CD, digital download	—	—	—
"—" denotes a title that did not chart, or was not released in that territory.

=== Mixtapes ===
List of mixtapes, with year released
Title	Album details
Art & War	Released: 2004; Label: Self-released; Format: Digital download
Street Knowledge	Released: 2004; Label: Self-released; Format: Digital download
The Beast from the East	Released: September 25, 2004; Label: Self-released; Format: Digital download
Election Day	Released: November 2, 2004; Label: Self-released; Format: Digital download
A Moment of Silence	Released: December 14, 2005; Label: Self-released; Format: Digital download
The Underground King	Released: December 17, 2005; Label: Self-released; Format: Digital download
Menace II Society Part 2	Released: December 17, 2005; Label: Self-released; Format: Digital download
Sharades	Released: December 19, 2005; Label: Self-released; Format: Digital download
Mixtape Murder	Released: December 20, 2005; Label: Self-released; Format: Digital download
A Bootlegger's Nightmare	Released: December 20, 2005; Label: Self-released; Format: Digital download
Unfinished Business	Released: December 20, 2005; Label: Self-released; Format: Digital download
A Threat and a Promise	Released: February 7, 2006; Label: Self-released; Format: Digital download
The Boyz in the Hood	Released: May 10, 2006; Label: Self-released; Format: Digital download
Bedstuy Do or Die (with Memphis Bleek)	Released: June 17, 2006; Label: Self-released; Format: Digital download
The 1.5 Million Dollar Man	Released: July 17, 2006; Label: Self-released; Format: Digital download
Second Place is the First Loser	Released: October 15, 2006; Label: Self-released; Format: Digital download
The Fourth Quarter Assassin	Released: December 2, 2006; Label: Self-released; Format: Digital download
Internationally Known	Released: March 31, 2007; Label: Self-released; Format: Digital download
Already a Legend	Released: October 3, 2007; Label: Self-released; Format: Digital download
Build or Destroy	Released: March 3, 2008; Label: Self-released; Format: Digital download
21 Gun Salute	Released: January 13, 2009; Label: Self-released; Format: Digital download
Military Grind	Released: August 16, 2009; Label: Self-released; Format: Digital download
Papoose Season	Released: April 23, 2010; Label: Self-released; Format: Digital download
The 2nd Coming	Released: February 28, 2011; Label: Self-released; Format: Digital download
King of New York	Released: October 3, 2011; Label: Self-released; Format: Digital download
Most Hated Alive	Released: December 4, 2012; Label: Self-released; Format: Digital download
Hoodie Season	Released: November 4, 2013; Label: Self-released; Format: Digital download
Hoodie Season 2	Released: January 30, 2014; Label: Self-released; Format: Digital download
Cigar Society	Released: March 5, 2014; Label: Self-released; Format: Digital download
Back 2 the Streets, Vol. 1	Released: October 5, 2018; Label: Self-released; Format: Digital download
Food for Thought	Released: July 25, 2019; Label: Self-released; Format: Digital download

=== Compilation mixtapes ===
List of mixtapes, with year released
Title	Album details
The Best of Papoose – The Official Mixtape	Released: 2006; Label: Flipmode Records; Format: Digital download
The Last Lyricist	Released: 2011; Label: Self-released; Format: Digital download

=== EPs ===
List of EPs, with year released
Title	EP details
January	Released: January 31, 2021; Label: Honorable Records; Format: Digital download
February	Released: February 28, 2021; Label: Honorable Records; Format: Digital download
March	Released: March 31, 2021; Label: Honorable Records; Format: Digital download
April	Released: April 30, 2021; Label: Honorable Records; Format: Digital download
May	Released: May 31, 2021; Label: Honorable Records; Format: Digital download
June	Released: June 30, 2021; Label: Honorable Records; Format: Digital download
July	Released: July 31, 2021; Label: Honorable Records; Format: Digital download
August	Released: August 31, 2021; Label: Honorable Records; Format: Digital download
September	Released: September 30, 2021; Label: Honorable Records; Format: Digital download
October	Released: October 31, 2021; Label: Honorable Records; Format: Digital download
November	Released: November 30, 2021; Label: Honorable Records; Format: Digital download
December	Released: December 31, 2021; Label: Honorable Records; Format: Digital download
Bars on Wheels: A Journey to Save Hip Hop	Released: November 28, 2025; Label: Wynn Records; Format: Digital download
Bars on Wheels: A Journey to Save Hip Hop (Deluxe)	Released: August 21, 2026; Label: Wynn Records; Format: Digital download

== Singles ==
=== As lead artist ===
List of singles, showing year released and album name
Title	Year	Album
"Thug Connection" (featuring AZ and Kool G Rap)	1999	—N/a
"Sharades"	2005	—N/a
"Alphabetical Slaughter"	2005	—N/a
"Bang It Out" (featuring Snoop Dogg)	2007	—N/a
"Stylin"	2008	—N/a
"Party Out In Brooklyn" (featuring St Laz)	2011	—N/a
"On Top of My Game" (featuring Mavado)	2012	The Nacirema Dream
"What's My Name" (featuring Remy Ma)	2013	The Nacirema Dream
"Get At Me" (featuring Ron Browz)	2013	The Nacirema Dream
"Current Events"	2014	—N/a
"New York State of Mind" (featuring Vado)	2014	—N/a
"Michael Jackson" (featuring Remy Ma and Ty Dolla Sign)	2015	You Can't Stop Destiny
"The Bank"	2015	You Can't Stop Destiny
"The Golden Child" (featuring Remy Ma and Angelica Villa)	2018	Underrated
"Nasty Time" (featuring Bianca Bonnie)	2019	TBA
"—" denotes a recording that did not chart or was not released in that territory.

=== As featured artist ===
List of singles as featured performer, with selected chart positions, showing year released and album name
Title	Year	Peak chart positions		Album
Title	Year	US	US R&B	Album
"Crowded" (Jeannie Ortega featuring Papoose)	2006	93	—	No Place Like BKLYN
"Can't Stop the Rain" (DJ Kay Slay featuring Shaq, Bun B and Papoose)	2006	—	—	—N/a
"Touch It (Remix)" (Busta Rhymes featuring Mary J. Blige, Rah Digga, Missy Elliott, Lloyd Banks, Papoose and DMX)	2006	—		—N/a
"Where You At" (Joe featuring Papoose)	2007	—	79	Ain't Nothin' Like Me
"Thug Luv" (DJ Kayslay featuring Maino, Papoose, Red Cafe and Ray J)	2010	—	—	More Than Just a DJ
"Sinner's Prayer" (Saigon featuring Papoose and Omar Epps)	2014	—	—	G.S.N.T. 3: The Troubled Times of Brian Carenard
"—" denotes a recording that did not chart or was not released in that territory.

== Guest appearances ==
List of non-single guest appearances, with other performing artists, showing year released and album name
Title	Year	Other artist(s)	Album
"Home Sweet Funeral Home"	1998	Kool G Rap, Jinx	Roots of Evil
"My Jealousy"	2006	Cam'ron, Slim Thug, All Star, Tef	—N/a
"Where You At?"	2006	Joe	Ain't Nothin' Like Me
"The Hardest Out"	2006	DJ Kay Slay, Greg Street, Remy Ma, Hell Rell	The Champions: North Meets South
"Pop the Trunk"	2006	DJ Kay Slay, Greg Street, Chamillionaire, Yung Joc	The Champions: North Meets South
"Live from the Block"	2006	DJ Kay Slay, Greg Street, Mike Jones, Paul Wall	The Champions: North Meets South
"Can't Stop the Reign 2006"	2006	DJ Kay Slay, Greg Street, Bun B, Shaquille O'Neal	The Champions: North Meets South
"Can't Stop the Reign"	2006	DJ Kay Slay, Greg Street, Remy Ma, Shaquille O'Neal, Busta Rhymes	The Champions: North Meets South
"Craaaazzzyy"	2007	DJ Absolut, J.R. Writer, Styles P, Hell Rell, Rick Ross	A Case of Supply & Demand
"Comprehend"	2008	Pete Rock	NY's Finest
"Men of Respect"	2010	DJ Kay Slay, Tony Yayo, Lloyd Banks, Jim Jones, Rell	More Than Just a DJ
"Layed Out"	2010	DJ Kay Slay, Bun B, Twista, Dorrough, Young Chris, Jay Rock	More Than Just a DJ
"Gangsta Shit"	2010	DJ Kay Slay, OJ da Juiceman, Yo Gotti	More Than Just a DJ
"Thug Luv"	2010	DJ Kay Slay, Maino, Red Café, Ray J	More Than Just a DJ
"Blockstars" (Remix)	2010	DJ Kay Slay, Busta Rhymes, Sheek Louch, Rick Ross, Cam'ron, Vado, Ray J	More Than Just a DJ
"Write Cha Name"	2011	Ron Browz	—N/a
"Victorious"	2012	DJ Kay Slay, Jon Connor, Fred the Godson, Mysonne, Sheek Louch	The Changing Of The Guard
"Fist Of Fury"	2012	DJ Kay Slay, Jon Connor, Fred The Godson, Mysonne, Sheek Louch	The Return Of The Gate Keeper
"Eight Is Enough"	2012	DJ Kay Slay, DJ Op, Styles P, ByrdGang Shoota, A-Mafia, Capone, Uncle Murda, Push Montana	The Return Of The Gate Keeper
"Lyrical Gangsta"	2012	DJ Kay Slay, Kendrick Lamar	Grown Man Hip Hop
"Year Of The Lyricist"	2013	DJ Kay Slay, Loaded Lux, Cormega	Grown Man Hip Hop Part 2 (Sleepin' With The Enemy)
"Cant Be Who You Are"	2013	DJ Kay Slay, Sauce Money, Jon Connor	Grown Man Hip Hop Part 2 (Sleepin' With The Enemy)
"Get Paid"	2013	Blink Money, French Montana, Chinx Drugz	—N/a
"Brooklyn's the Borough"	2013	Tony Touch, Uncle Murda	The Piece Maker 3: Return of the 50 MCs
"Fire"	2014	DJ Kay Slay, Vado, Young Chris, Nathaniel	The Rise of a City
"Last Days of Hip Hop"	2014	DJ Kay Slay, Jon Connor	The Rise of a City
"Rolling Stone"	2014	Game, Young Buck	The Rise of a City
"Real Hip Hop"	2014	DJ Kay Slay, Vado, Ransom	The Last Hip Hop Disciple
"Enter the Cypher"	2014	DJ Kay Slay, Termanology, Chris Rivers, William Young	The Last Hip Hop Disciple
"Freedom of Speech"	2014	DJ Kay Slay, Raekwon, Saigon	The Last Hip Hop Disciple
"Bucket Hat Low"	2021	Russ	Chomp 2
