= Ride Out (disambiguation) =

"Ride Out" is a 2015 song by Kid Ink, Tyga, Wale, YG and Rich Homie Quan from the soundtrack of Furious 7

Ride Out may also refer to:

== Music ==
- Ride Out (album), 2014 album by Bob Seger

=== Songs ===
- "Ride Out", song by Chilliwack from Chilliwack
- "Ride Out", song by Death in June from All Pigs Must Die
- "Ride Out", song by Layzie Bone from Cleveland
- "Ride Out", song by rock band Vaux from their 2003 album There Must be Some Way to Stop Them
- "Ride Out", song by British artist Angel from his 2013 album About Time
- "Ride Out", song by K. Michelle / Barry White
- "Ride Out", song by B.G. / The Hot Boys / Lil Wayne / Mil / Beanie Sigel Composed by J Smith / Lil Wayne Mannie Fresh production discography
- "Ride Out", song by Bob Seger composed by Bob Seger from Ride Out
- "Ride Out", song by Ashanti from Foolish/Unfoolish
- "Ride Out", song by Mack 10 feat Chingy from Hustla's Handbook
- "Ride Out", song by DJ Magic Mike
- "Ride Out", song by Agallah from You Already Know
- "Ride Out", song by Cassidy (rapper)
- "Ride Out", song by B-Real
- "Ride Out", song by Psychopathic Rydas from Ryden Dirtay
- "Ride Out", song by E.S.G. from City Under Siege
- "Ride Out", song by Cha Cha from Dear Diary
- "Ride Out", song by Ryan Toby from Soul of a Songwriter 2006
- "Ride Out", song by Koushik from Be With
- "Ride Out", song by Rey (band)
- "Ride Out", song by Hussein Fatal discography
- "Ride Out", song by J. Cardim
- "Ride Out", song by Southern rap group 95 South from One Mo' 'Gen
- "Ride Out", song by Ron Browz production discography
