= Na Na Nana Na Na =

Single by Jim Jones featuring Bree-Beauty

from the album Pray IV Reign
- Released: January 1, 2009; February 17, 2009 (iTunes)
- Genre: Hip hop
- Length: 3:59
- Label: Columbia, E1
- Songwriters: Duane Bridgeford, Brittney Taylor, Jed Cappelli, Matthew Friedman, Joseph Jones
- Producer: ILLFONICS

Jim Jones singles chronology
"My Swagg" (2009)	"Na Na Nana Na Na" (2009)	"Blow the Bank" (2009)

Music video
- "Na Na Nana Na Na" on YouTube

"Na Na Nana Na Na" is a song by American hip hop recording artist Jim Jones, released as the second single from his fourth studio album, Pray IV Reign (2009). The song features vocals from Brittney "Bree-Beauty" Taylor and was produced by production duo ILLFONICS. The title of the song refers to "nyah nyah nyah nyah nyah nyah" the lexigraphic representation of a common children's chant often used in taunting.

== Music video ==
The music video for the song was directed by OLIVE! and Jim Jones. A behind-the-scenes footage was released February 15, 2009. The official video was released on March 1; it features cameo appearances by members from ByrdGang and Skull Gang. The video appeared as the "New Joint of the Day" on BET's 106 & Park, on March 2. The video has an alternate ending on 106 & Park, after Jones' third verse, ByrdGang member Mel Matrix appears and raps his verse to "Man Down", a song that was featured on Jones' official mixtape, Street Religion (Heron 3:16).

== Charts ==
Chart (2009)	Peak Position
U.S. Billboard Hot R&B/Hip-Hop Songs	75

== Freestyles ==
- Papoose
- Cassidy
- Rick Ross
