= Young Seph =

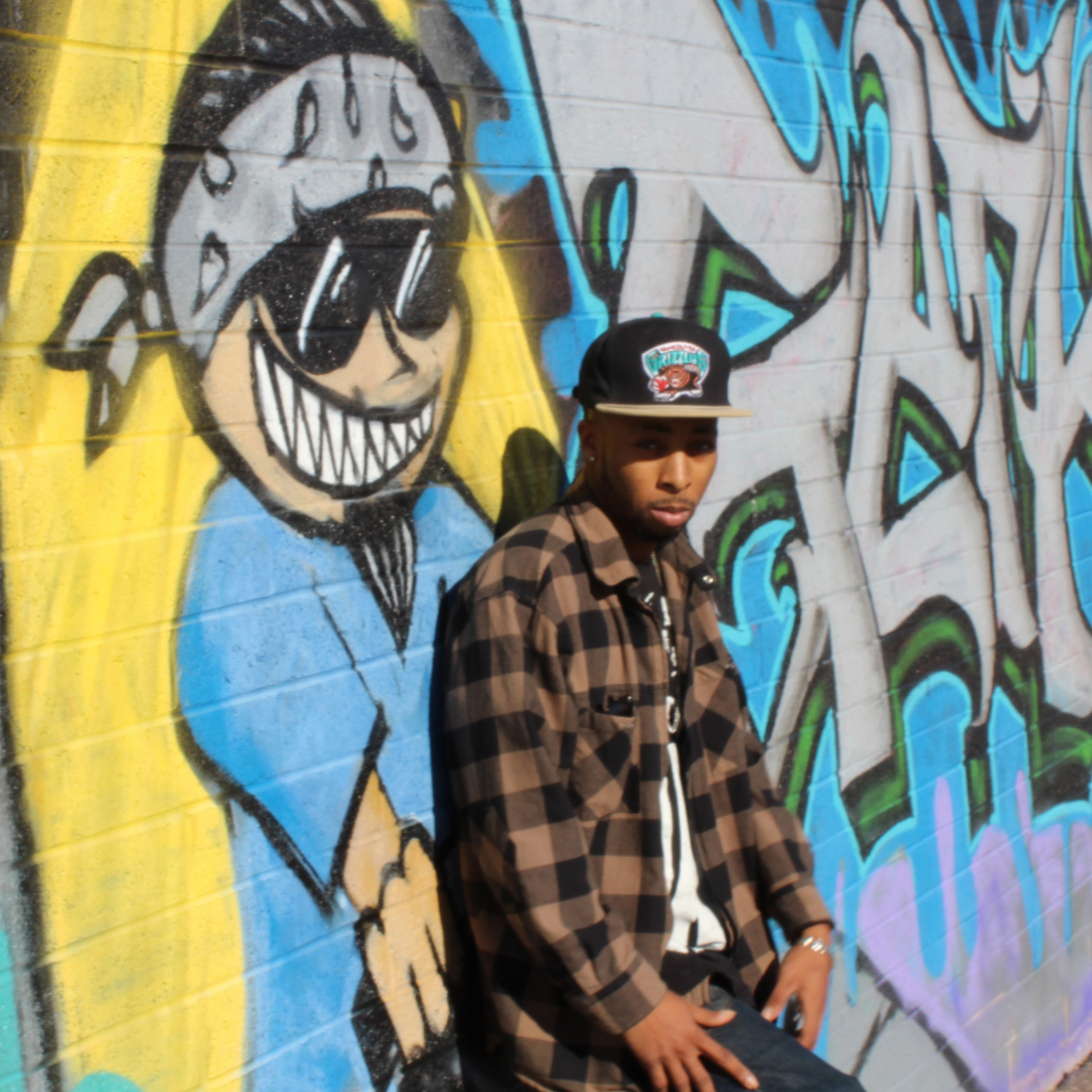

Background information
- Also known as: Seph
- Born: Joseph Holmes
- Origin: Sierra Vista, Arizona
- Genres: Hip hop, R&B,
- Occupations: Record producer, songwriter artist
- Instruments: Keyboard, drums FL studio
- Years active: 2009–present
- Label: Young Seph Productions
- Website: YoungSeph.com

Joseph Holmes, better known as Young Seph, is an American music producer and songwriter born in Sierra Vista, Arizona. Young Seph has produced for artists such as 50 Cent, Jim Jones, Lloyd Banks, Troy Ave, Rocko Young Buck and Havoc, among others.

== Music career ==
Young Seph landed his first major placement in 2009 on Jim Jones 4th studio album Pray IV Reign. In late 2010, Lloyd Banks confirmed production from Seph on his most recently released album H.F.M. 2. Sephs' most recent work was released on March 17, 2011 "Boomerang" 11 out of 11 Freestyle by 50 Cent.

In early 2012 Seph was featured in Red Bull's National Super Bowl TV Commercial "Red Bull Gives You Wings 60", featuring Blake Griffin and other Red Bull sponsored professional athletes.

In early 2019 started the YoungSeph.com, an Online Beat Store for Artist, Labels, and Films/Commercials looking for music production, hooks & or Songs. The website also features beat tutorials, live studio sessions, and more.

== Production credits and discography ==
=== Jim Jones – Pray IV Reign (album) (2009) ===
- 13. "Pop Off" featuring NOE & Mel Matrix

=== 50 Cent (2009) ===
- "Follow Instructions"

=== Havoc – From Now On (mixtape) (2009) ===
- 10. "Believer"
- 17. "H is Back" [Single]

=== Nu Jerzey Devil – Mr.Red Karpet (album) (2009) ===
- 15. "Ready or not"

=== Mica Swain and Waka Flocka Flame – [single] (2009) ===
- "Body Talk"

=== Havoc – (2010) ===
- "The Warm Up"

=== Tony Yayo and Joe Young – (2010) ===
- "Semi (I'm a Rider)"

=== Young Buck and Savion Saddam – (2010) ===
- "Gettin Money"

=== Lloyd Banks – H.F.M. 2 (Hunger for More 2) (Album) (2010) ===
- 14. "This is the Life" co.produced by Cardiak

=== 50 Cent (2011) ===
- "Boomerang" (Freestyle)

=== JRand [single] (2012) ===
- "Up Against The Wall"

=== JRand [remix] (2012) ===
- "Up Against The Wall" Remix Featuring Juicy J, Juvenile, Doe B

=== Young Buck and Savion Saddam – Salute to the Streetz (album) (2012) ===
- 1. "Salute"
- 2. "My City" (Remix)
- 3. "Put It All on the Line"
- 4. "Birdshit"
- 5. "Shine on Em'"
- 6. "Mr. Sportscenter (Throw Away Money)"
- 7. "Gangsta Dick"
- 8. "If I Had U"
- 9. "Rucker"
- 10. "Bang Dat"
- 11. "Tourchure"
- 12. "Word Iz"
- 13. "He Snitchin"
- 14. "Struggling"

=== Savion Saddam – [single] (2016) ===
- "Cook Out" featuring Young Seph & Joe Green

=== Joe Green x Savion Saddam x Young Seph - (2017) ===
- "Trap Door" (Single)

=== Savion Saddam x Joe Green x Young Seph – J.ealous O.nes E.nvy (Mixtape) (2017) ===
- 1. "Turnt 2 The Max" Featuring Young Seph
- 2. "All Day" Featuring Young Seph
- 3. "Money Call" Featuring Young Seph
- 4. "Cookout" Featuring Young Seph
- 5. "Trap Door"
- 6. "Real Niggaz"
- 7. "Social Media" Featuring Young Buck & Chapo
- 8. "Count It Up" Featuring Young Seph
- 9. "Cash Flow" Featuring Young Seph
- 10. "BullSh*t" Featuring Young Seph
- 11. "Never" Featuring Young Seph
- 12. "All the Way Up" Featuring Young Seph

=== Young Buck – Box of Chocolates (Ep) (2019) ===
- 2. "Take Your Time"
- 3. "Put it on Me”

=== Young Buck – Compulsive (Ep) (2019) ===
- 1. "Check"
- 2. "Club Sensations”
- 5. "Roll Up"
- 6. "Move"
- 10. "Appreciate Me"

=== Young Buck – The Impeachment (Ep) (2019) ===
- 3. "Highway"
- 5. "Democratic Party”
- 6. "Us Treasury"
- 9. "Gangsta Walk"
- 10. "Republican Party"
- 12. "Tear Drop"
- 17. "Lose Me"

=== Young Buck – Outbreak (Ep) (2020) ===
- 1. "Whats Up"
- 2. "All We Do”
- 3. "Signed Up"
- 4. "So Do I"
- 5. "Step"
- 6. "Do You Challenge"

=== Young Buck – [single] (2020) ===
- "Together"

=== Young Buck – Compulsive (Ep) (2019) ===
- 1. "Check"
- 2. "Club Sensations”
- 5. “Roll up”
- 6. “Move”
- 10. ”Appreciate Me”

=== Young Buck - [Single] (2022) ===
- "Its Nothing"

=== Young Buck - [Single] (2024) ===
- "Life Change"
