= The "Demo" Tape =

Mixtape by R. Kelly
- Released: 2009
- Recorded: 2009
- Genres: Hip-hop; R&B
- Length: 57:00
- Producers: R. Kelly; T-Town Productions; Infinity; DJ Drama; DJ Skee

The "Demo" Tape is the first and only mixtape released by American singer R. Kelly in June 2009. The mixtape originally was to keep fans over until Kelly's forthcoming album was released. Hosted by DJ Drama and DJ Skee and released under each of their mixtape brands, Gangsta Grillz and Skeetox. R. Kelly remixes several popular R&B/Hip-Hop songs and performs some original songs as well.

== Reception ==
Professional ratings
Review scores
Source	Rating
Vibe	(?)
XXL	(Hood)

The mixtape received mixed reviews by critics and fans alike. R&B singer and longtime Kelly fan Trey Songz released a diss track, "Death of Autotune (R. Kelly Diss)", a freestyle of Jay-Z's "D.O.A." In the song, Trey expressed his disappointment in R. Kelly's use of the auto-tune effect throughout the mixtape. He also explained on his blog that he also disliked the use of it on Kelly's previous album, Double Up. He ended by saying, "If throwing rocks at the throne wakes up the King, consider them thrown. I just want R. Kelly back..." Chris Brown has stated this mixtape as an influence to his own debut mixtape.

== Track listing ==
#	Title	Length	Performer(s)	Samples
1	"Intro"	0:28	R. Kelly	
2	"Kelly's 12 Play Remix"	4:15	R. Kelly (featuring. The-Dream)	"Kelly's 12 Play" by The-Dream
3	"Club to a Bedroom"	3:59	R. Kelly	
4	"Disrespect My Shorty"	4:53	R. Kelly (featuring. Plies)	
5	"Fuck Every Girl"	4:25	R. Kelly (featuring. Lil Wayne)	"Every Girl" by Young Money Entertainment
6	"Best I Ever Had"	2:25	R. Kelly (featuring. Drake)	"Best I Ever Had" by Drake
7	"Banging the Headboard"	3:19	R. Kelly	
8	"P.U.S.S.Y. Cry"	3:04	R. Kelly	
9	"Love Lockdown"	4:02	R. Kelly (featuring. Kanye West)	"Love Lockdown" by Kanye West
10	"Supaman High"	3:25	R. Kelly (featuring. OJ Da Juiceman)	Remix of "Supaman High" by R. Kelly
11	"Turning Me On"	2:53	R. Kelly (featuring. Keri Hilson)	"Turnin Me On" by Keri Hilson
12	"Turn My Swag On"	2:18	R. Kelly (featuring. Soulja Boy Tell'em)	"Turn My Swag On" by Soulja Boy Tell 'Em
13	"Supa Dupa Man"	2:45	R. Kelly	
14	"Birthday Sex"	2:52	R. Kelly (featuring. Jeremih)	"Birthday Sex" by Jeremih
15	"Tip the Waiter"	3:58	R. Kelly	
16	"Makin Me Wanna"	3:05	R. Kelly (featuring. Akon)	
17	"Move"	2:11	R. Kelly	"Move (If You Wanna)" by Mims
18	"Chopped & Screwed"	5:22	R. Kelly (featuring. T-Pain)	"Chopped & Skrewed" by T-Pain (featuring. Ludacris)
