= Soul of a Songwriter =

Studio album by Ryan Toby
- Released: 2006
- Recorded: 2005–2006
- Genre: R&B; Pop; Hip-Hop
- Label: Mass Appeal Entertainment, Overflow Entertainment

Singles from Departure
- 1. "Just My Thang" Released: 2006

Soul of a Songwriter is the debut album by Ryan Toby released on 2006 by Overflow Entertainment.

== Track listing ==
1. "Soul Of A Songwriter (Intro)"
2. "I'm In Love"
3. "Just My Thang"
4. "All I Do"
5. "Change Goin Come"
6. "Ride Out (Interlude)"
7. "Come Back"
8. "So Good"
9. "Don't Worry"
10. "Miss America"
11. "Soul Of A Songwriter (Outro)"
