= Ron Browz =

American rapper and producer (born 1982)

- Born: Rondell Edwin Turner; December 6, 1982 (age 43); Manhattan, New York City, U.S.
- Genres: East Coast hip-hop; pop rap
- Occupations: Rapper; singer; songwriter; record producer
- Works: Discography; production
- Years active: 1997–present
- Labels: Ether Boy; Universal Motown

Rondell Edwin Turner (born December 6, 1982), better known by his stage name Ron Browz (/ˈbraʊz/), is an American rapper, singer, and record producer from Harlem, New York. He gained major recognition for his production work on fellow New York rapper Nas' 2001 diss track, "Ether". Browz has since adopted the nickname "Ether Boy", namesake of his record label, founded in 2009.

As a recording artist, he became known for extensive use of Auto-Tune vocal effects that were popular at the time. His 2008 single, "Pop Champagne" (with Jim Jones featuring Juelz Santana) peaked within the top 40 of the Billboard Hot 100, while his guest appearance on Busta Rhymes' single "Arab Money" entered the chart that same year. Also in 2008, he signed with Universal Motown Records to release his debut solo single "Jumping (Out the Window)", which entered the Bubbling Under Hot 100 chart, although it was critically panned, along with "Arab Money". He then parted ways with the label and self-released his debut studio album, Etherlibrium (2009), which was further panned by critics.

== Biography ==
=== 1982–1991: Early life ===
Rondell Edwin Turner was born on December 6, 1982, in Harlem, New York City. After spending a short time as an artist on the small label Big Boss Records, he taught himself how to make hip hop beats.

=== 1998–2008: Early production work ===
Ron Browz began producing professionally after being brought on by Harlem-based rapper Big L, whom he met in 1998. Browz then played the rapper "some beats he’d been working on". In a retrospective interview, Browz described Big L's "Ebonics" as "the first record I produced that I heard on the radio." His time with Big L was brief, but "effective", according to him. They produced five songs until Big L was killed in 1999. Recounting the impact of Big L's death, Browz said "It hurt me and it hurt Harlem. I took a small break just to clear my head and to really see what I wanted to do. Then one day I said, 'I’m just going to go hard with this music thing.'"

Ron Browz gained fame in 2001 after producing Nas' critically acclaimed song "Ether", which was used at that time to diss fellow rapper Jay-Z. The manner in which Nas decided to use Ron Browz's beat was unusual - Browz's manager "bumped into [Nas's] travel agent" inside the Def Jam building, and "begged her to give the beat to Nas", which she did. Browz was unaware that his beat was used to make a scathing diss track until he heard the assembled song in the studio.

After "Ether" gained infamy and popularity, Browz began to refer to himself as "Ether Boy", after the song. He later said in an interview that because his name was never said on the song, he did not receive recognition for the effort, so he began singing "Ether Boy" as a producer tag on songs to make his presence clearer. In 2008, Ron Browz released the compilation album The Wonder Years, which had features from Jadakiss, Jae Millz and Papoose.

=== 2008–2009: Major label releases ===
Ron Browz began working on his solo album Etherboy after signing with the label Universal Motown in September 2008. Browz retrospectively recounted that around this time, he was "running low on money" and unsure of his future in music. After hearing the song "Rider Pt. 2" which featured a performance by 50 Cent that used the Auto-Tune effect, Ron Browz was inspired to use the technology in his own music, which led to him recording the similarly Auto-Tune-heavy "Pop Champagne". A remix of "Pop Champagne" featuring rappers Jim Jones and Juelz Santana was released to commercial success later in 2008 as the first single for the prospective Etherboy album. "Pop Champagne" was included on Jones's 2009 album Pray IV Reign. Another remix featuring Busta Rhymes was also created for the song with altered lyrics celebrating Barack Obama's victory in the 2008 presidential election.

Also in 2008, he released his solo single "Jumping (Out the Window)", which featured a similarly heavy use of Auto-Tune. The song became a regional hit, receiving airplay on New York radio stations and entering the Bubbling Under Hot 100 chart, but was critically panned. The song also received an upbeat rock remix with pop punk band Forever the Sickest Kids.

Browz was also featured on Busta Rhymes' single "Arab Money", which was produced by Browz and featured more of his characteristic Auto-Tune. The themes and lyrics of the song ignited controversy, particularly from Muslim communities; Music commentator Eric Ducker noted that Browz sings "non-sensical Arabic" in the chorus, likening it to "doing a song involving China and having the hook be: Ching chang ching chong chong." Browz also sang the hook on and produced Capone-N-Noreaga's song "Rotate" off their album Channel 10.

According to Browz, his label Universal Motown Records did not think his planned Etherboy album should release, which confused him. In a later interview, he floated the possibility that the then-recent release of "D.O.A. (Death of Auto-Tune)", a Jay-Z song which featured scathing criticism of the use of Ron Browz's favored Auto-Tune, had influenced the label's decision, but mostly expressed confusion as to their decision.

In May 2009, Browz released the single "20 Dollars". (Note: Various sources including Ron Browz himself have referred to the song by numerous variant names and spellings, including "$20 Dollarz" and "Gimme 20 Dollars". On the official release on streaming services, the title is simply "20 Dollars".) The song was not a success commercially, which he blamed on his label's refusal to promote the song. This series of events spurred his decision to begin parting with Universal Motown. Despite its lack of commercial success, "20 Dollars" garnered popularity online as an internet meme among fans of the Slenderman mythos. This originated from a video uploaded by YouTube user brett824 that claimed to have "discovered" missing audio of a Marble Hornets episode, but in reality was a humorous bait-and-switch that instead played excerpts from "20 Dollars" whenever Slenderman appeared on-screen. The song became associated with Slenderman, who fans facetiously claimed only stalked its victims because of its desire for "20 dollars". A remix of the song featuring Mase, OJ da Juiceman, Jim Jones, Shawty Lo was later released in December 2009, as well as another next year that featured Nicki Minaj in place of Jim Jones.

=== 2009–present: Independent and mixtape circuit ===
The Etherboy album was never released, and Browz parted ways with Universal Motown in October 2009 due to business and creative differences. Browz began releasing projects independently through his label Ether Boy Records. The first of these was the extended play Timeless in 2009, which featured the original version of "20 Dollars" and the remix with Nicki Minaj, among other songs.

In February 2010, he released "Ride Ya Bike (She's A Biker)", a collaboration with Foxy Brown and Browz's first single since "20 Dollars". The song notably featured a greatly reduced amount of Auto-Tune on Browz's vocals. In an interview with VIBE magazine, Ron Browz explained his intentions for his career going forward: He claimed he had planned to reduce his use of Auto-Tune for some time, and said he would be recording songs with varied amounts of the effect from then on.

On July 20, 2010, he released his debut album Etherlibrium, which also featured a greatly reduced use of Auto-Tune. The album did not achieve commercial success and was further panned by critics. In 2011, he released the mixtape The Christening, which featured a change in style to more traditional New York hip hop. Andrew Noz of The Fader gave the album a positive review, praising Browz's artistic improvement from his previous Auto-Tune laden hits. His later independent releases have not received much attention.

== Musical style ==
Ron Browz's series of Auto-Tune-laden hits in the late 2000s have been described as "having mastered the craft of creating mindless melodies that catch on".

Describing his recording process, Browz said in 2010: "I just play the beat, put my headphones on and say whatever comes to mind. I don’t care how dumb or how silly you think it sounds, because I know the catchiest songs end up being big records. And in this industry, hooks are the most important part of the song." He has also described his recording process as "really energy-based", with his musical output heavily dependent on his mood.

== Discography ==
- Etherlibrium (2010)
