= Etherlibrium =

Studio album by Ron Browz
- Released: July 20, 2010
- Recorded: 2009–2010
- Genre: Hip hop
- Length: 49:54
- Label: Ether Boy; Owl Pal; TG2
- Producer: Ron Browz; Large Professor

Ron Browz chronology
Timeless EP (2009)	Etherlibrium (2010)

Etherlibrium is the debut studio album by Harlem rapper/producer Ron Browz, which was released on July 20, 2010.

== Background ==
Guest appearances on the album include Maino, Red Cafe, J.R. Writer and others as well.

On the topic of Etherlibrium being released on iTunes only and his original debut album, Etherboy being shelved, Ron Browz explained his feelings towards these things happening below:

I feel like I owe the fans this iTunes release collectively, being that I didn’t get to put out the album as planned,” Ron says. “All the fans got from me was select singles, so this is more street records than radio records. Before Jay-Z’s “D.O.A.” even came out, I already had records without the auto-tune. People who really follow what I’ve been doing know that I was just experimenting and having fun. I made it creative and made it work.

Ron Browz discussed to why the idea of Etherlibrium being released came about below:

I want people to really get to know me. I don’t believe in doing just one kind of music, and I’m just doing whatever I feel. I put my heart into this Etherlibrium project – it’s more lyrical than stuff people have really heard from me. It’s well put together, and I don’t think I was meant to be limited to releasing singles… I was meant to put whole projects together.

== Music videos ==
A video was released for "Good Morning" on June 4, 2010, on July 12, 2010, for "Half Time 2010", on July 20, 2010, for "In a Zone", and on September 7, 2010, for "Wishing on a Star".

== Reception ==
Steve Juon, writing for RapReviews, gave the album a harshly negative review, criticizing the beats as "phoned-in" and painful to the ears, and Browz's flow as derivative. He scored the album a 3/10 overall. Amanda Bassa of HipHopDX expressed a similar viewpoint, noting "While he may have largely pushed Auto-Tune to the side on his new album, Browz shows that without the studio crutch, his rhymes offer very little." She criticized Browz's flows, singing voice, and production, specifically noting Browz's "dull and uninspired" use of well-known samples. Bassa gave the album a 2/5 score, and expressed curiosity regarding "how bad [Browz's] shelved major label album EtherBoy had to have been to never see the light of day" given that an album as "mediocre" as Etherlibrium had been released.

== Track listing ==
No.	Title	Producer(s)	Length
1.	"Etherlibrium Intro" (featuring Oshy)	Ron Browz	2:25
2.	"Wishing on a Star" (featuring Maino, Fred the Godson & Malaika Russel)	Ron Browz	3:53
3.	"In a Zone"	Ron Browz	2:29
4.	"Don't Breathe It"	Ron Browz	3:57
5.	"What Up Bro Remix" (featuring Red Cafe)	Ron Browz	3:14
6.	"Good Morning" (featuring J.R. Writer)	Ron Browz	3:37
7.	"You Can Blossom"	Ron Browz	3:04
8.	"Harlem Put Ya Hands Up"	Ron Browz	2:51
9.	"Winded"	Ron Browz	2:42
10.	"My Friend Skit"	Ron Browz	1:02
11.	"Slow Motion"	Ron Browz	4:00
12.	"Start Off Walking"	Ron Browz	2:53
13.	"Half Time 2010"	Ron Browz; Large Professor	3:05
14.	"Wanna Be You"	Ron Browz	3:03
15.	"I Swear" (featuring Sharpadon & Ricky Blaze)	Ron Browz	3:45
16.	"EtherBoy Allstars" (featuring Pretty Boy Maloy, Mone & M5)	Ron Browz	3:53
