= You Can't Stop Destiny =

Studio album by Papoose
- Released: July 17, 2015
- Recorded: 2014–2015
- Genre: Hip hop
- Length: 39:30
- Label: Honorable Records
- Producer: Papoose (exec.); Shawn Strong (exec.); Antwan "Amadeus" Thompson; DJ Premier; DJ Tip; Gemcrates; G.U.N. Productions; Havoc; Ron Browz; Showbiz

Papoose chronology
| The Nacirema Dream (2013) | You Can't Stop Destiny (2015) | Underrated (2019) |

Singles from You Can't Stop Destiny
- 1. "Mobbing" Released: June 11, 2015; 2. "The Bank" Released: June 25, 2015; 3. "The Plug" Released: July 7, 2015

You Can't Stop Destiny is the second studio album by American rapper Papoose. It was released on July 17, 2015 through Honorable Records with distribution via INgrooves. Production was handled by DJ Tip, G.U.N. Productions, Ron Browz, Antwan "Amadeus" Thompson, DJ Premier, Gemcrates, Havoc and Showbiz. The album features guest appearances from A.G., Maino, Red Café, Remy Ma, Troy Ave and Ty Dolla $ign.

== Track listing ==
| No. | Title | Producer(s) | Length |
|---|---|---|---|
| 1. | "The Bank" | Ron Browz | 2:50 |
| 2. | "You Ain't Built Like That" | Antwan "Amadeus" Thompson | 2:47 |
| 3. | "Mobbing" (featuring Troy Ave) | Havoc | 3:33 |
| 4. | "The Plug" | DJ Premier | 3:33 |
| 5. | "Michael Jackson" (featuring Remy Ma & Ty Dolla $ign) | Ron Browz | 3:00 |
| 6. | "Wish a Nigga Would" | DJ Tip | 2:32 |
| 7. | "Everything to Gain" (featuring A.G.) | Showbiz | 3:18 |
| 8. | "Revenge" (featuring Maino & Red Café) | G.U.N. Productions | 3:26 |
| 9. | "Team US" | DJ Tip | 2:10 |
| 10. | "You Draggin It" | DJ Tip | 2:46 |
| 11. | "Global Warming Pt 2" | G.U.N. Productions | 3:38 |
| 12. | "Illuminati" | Gemcrates | 2:21 |
| 13. | "Obituary 2014" (Bonus track) | G.U.N. Productions | 3:35 |
| Total length: | | | 39:30 |
