= Pop Champagne =

Single by Jim Jones and Ron Browz featuring Juelz Santana

from the album Etherboy and Pray IV Reign
- Released: June 2008 (original); September 4, 2008 (remix)
- Genre: Hip hop
- Length: 3:35 (album version); 3:32 (pop radio edit)
- Label: Ether Boy; Columbia; Universal Motown; Koch
- Songwriters: Joseph Jones; Rondell Turner; LaRon James
- Producer: Ron Browz

Jim Jones singles chronology
"The Good Stuff" (2008)	"Pop Champagne" (2008)	"My Swagg" (2009)

Ron Browz singles chronology
"Pop Champagne" (2008)	"Arab Money" (2008)

Juelz Santana singles chronology
"Splash" (2008)	"Pop Champagne" (2008)	"Ride (Remix)" (2008)

Music video
- "Pop Champagne" on YouTube

"Pop Champagne" is a song by American hip hop recording artist Ron Browz, originally released independently in June 2008. It is most famous for a remix with fellow American rappers Jim Jones and Juelz Santana that was officially released as a single on September 4, 2008 by Columbia and Universal Motown Records. The remixed version of the song serves as the lead single from Jones' fourth studio album Pray IV Reign (2009). "Pop Champagne" received mixed reviews from critics, but proved to be Jones' second most successful single to date, behind his 2006 hit "We Fly High".

== Background, recording and composition ==
The original recording solely featured the producer of the song, Ron Browz; the most popular version of "Pop Champagne" featuring Jim Jones and Juelz Santana is actually a remix. "Pop Champagne" features heavy use of the Auto-Tune software. Ron Browz, recounting the inspiration to use it, recalled hearing the song "Rider Pt. 2" which features a performance by 50 Cent which also uses the software. After hearing it, he contacted his audio engineers and requested a copy of the software. Upon receiving the plugin, he began working on the song.

It was the first time Browz had ever tried using the Auto-Tune software, and he struggled with it while initially recording vocals to match the original instrumental, later recounting that "I didn't know you have to be on key". As a result, he stripped the pitched instrumentation from the verses, leaving just the characteristic percussion and Browz's vocals in the mix. The musical style of the resulting instrumental was a departure from that of Ron Browz's previous released music.

The lyrics of the song, which heavily feature the popping of Champagne bottles referenced in the title, were inspired by experiences in Ron Browz's youth. He recounted in an interview: "When I was young I had a lot of older dudes in Harlem, when it was people’s birthdays or when it was nice outside, just to enjoy themselves they would pop [Champagne]. I used to be one of the little guys they used to be like 'taste this, you ain't never had this before.'" The lyrics specifically name-drop the Champagne house Veuve Clicquot, among other topics. At the beginning of the song, Browz sings his nickname "Ether Boy", which is a reference to him having produced the beat for the song "Ether" for Nas some years prior. Ron Browz later recounted him and his girlfriend laughing at the vocalization because of "how funny it sounded" when he showed her the song. More generally, he thought that the final product "was a joke". The original record was finished in a day, according to Browz.

He showed the recording to other people in the music industry, from whom it received some positive reception. Hence, Ron Browz independently released the original version of "Pop Champagne" through his Ether Boy record label in June 2008, and it became a regional radio hit.

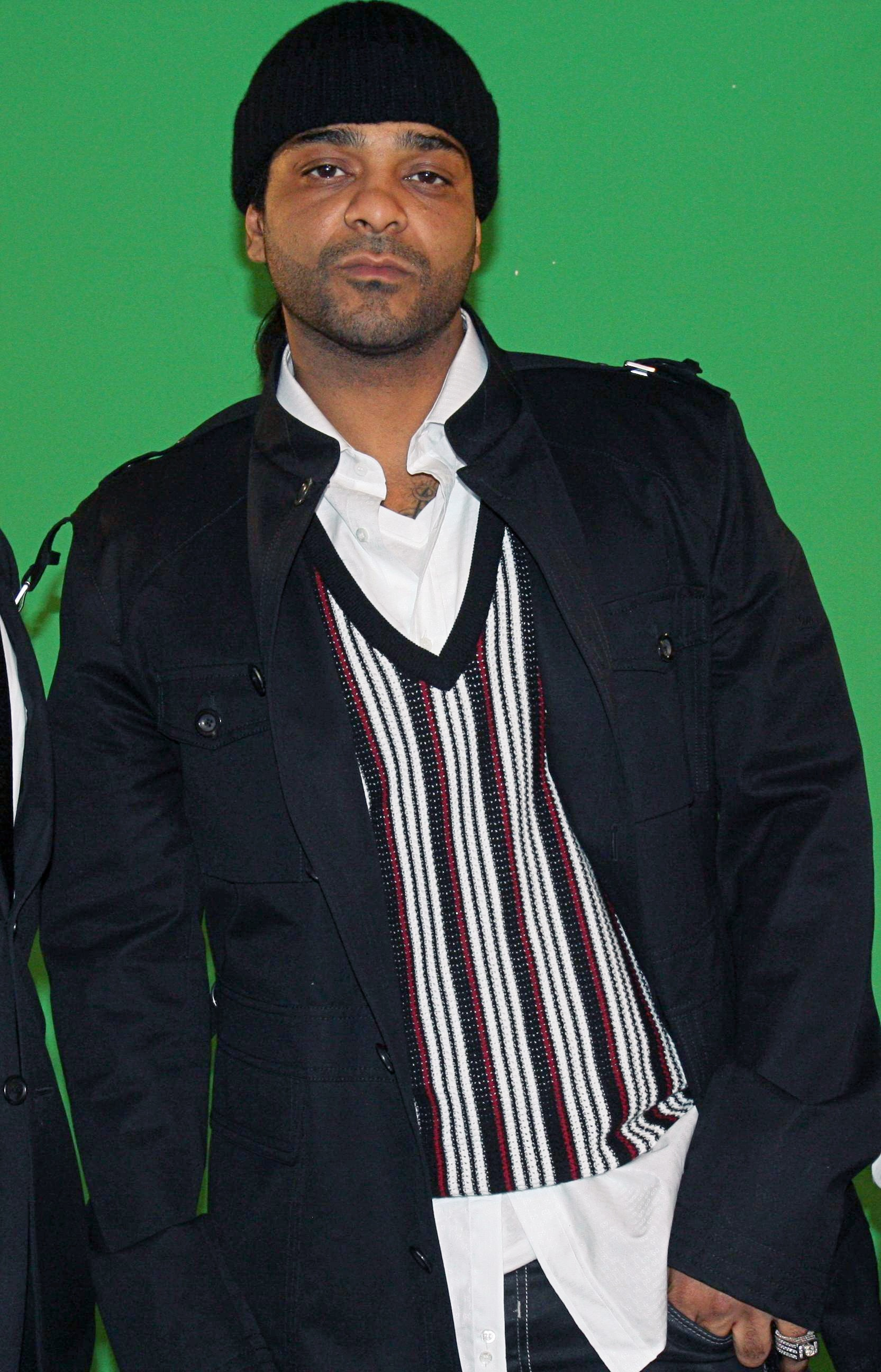
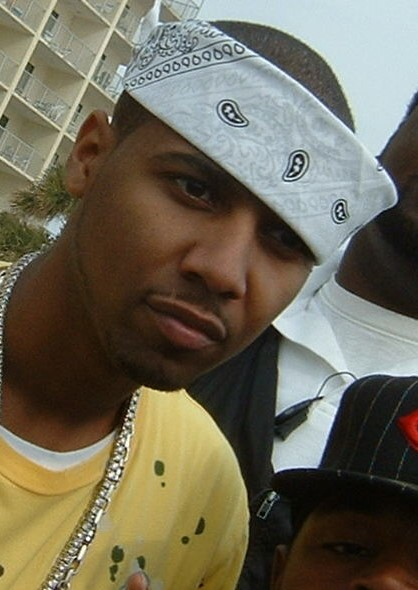
Jim Jones (left) and Juelz Santana (right) are featured on the remixed version of "Pop Champagne".

The popular remixed version of "Pop Champagne" began taking shape when rapper Jim Jones heard the original version of the song for the first time, being played by DJ Jazzy Joyce, "at 4:30 in the morning", according to Jones. After thinking about "how much Ron wanted to become an artist and break into the game", he remarked on the "good sound" of the song. Jones later recounted: "I was just being courteous, as he did so many hot beats for me." After that, he met with Ron Browz and pulled up the track, aiming to "see what it do.'" After arriving at the recording studio, Jones unexpectedly fell asleep, confusing Browz, who recalled "sitting there for two hours", unsure whether he should leave. Suddenly, Jones woke up, and requested the microphone be turned on, and immediately recorded his verse for "Pop Champagne", deeply impressing Ron Browz, who later described it as the most impressive thing he had seen someone do in the studio. In his verse, Jones recounts his order of drinks, referencing various alcoholic beverages throughout.

Jones later recounted that after the recording of his verse, "It started to sound a little bit crazy, and I said, 'Well, let's see if we put Juelz [Santana] on it how crazy could it get. And I called Young Hub, and Hub was like, 'Aiight, on the strength of you, I'll jump on it for you."

== Release and promotion ==
The remixed version of "Pop Champagne" was released on September 4, 2008 through Columbia, Universal Motown, and Koch Records and achieved commercial success. Its artist credits were noted by some critics as unusual, as they list Jim Jones as the lead artist despite the fact that it was originally released as a Ron Browz solo single. Nevertheless, the song served as a major boost to Ron Browz's publicity and fame, as previously he had been "largely unknown outside of music industry circles".

The music video for "Pop Champagne" was directed by Dale Resteghini and Jim Jones. It features cameo appearances by Dame Dash, Busta Rhymes, Mike Epps and Jessica Rich from Real Chance of Love. Jonah Weiner, writing for Slate magazine, described the video as containing homoerotic undertones in a scene where "Jim Jones and Juelz Santana giddily douse each other with frothy white geysers of bubbly."

== Critical reception ==
"Pop Champagne" received mixed reviews from critics. VIBE magazine described "Pop Champagne", alongside "Arab Money" and "Jumping (Out the Window)", as representing Browz having "mastered the craft of creating mindless melodies that catch on". MTV News ranked the song #27 on their list of the top 28 commercially released hip-hop songs of the year. Ben Westhoff, writing for the Houston Press, said the song was one of the tracks on Pray IV Reign that showed off Jones's "hypnotic, breathy delivery".

"Pop Champagne" was compared by multiple critics to Jones's 2006 hit single "We Fly High". Chris Ryan of Spin magazine said it was the only song on the album Pray IV Reign "that recall[ed] the balls-out hedonism" that "We Fly High" possessed, and David Jeffries of AllMusic called it a "club anthem". Chris Gaerig of PopMatters was far more negative, describing the song as "a shell of its predecessor, 'We Fly High'". He called the song's "listenability [...] near zero", referring to Browz's hook as "processed garble" and saying the song was worse off as a result of the lack of "[Jim Jones's] staple ad libbing". Jesse Cataldo of Slant Magazine called the song "remarkably anemic, nearly drowning in Auto-Tune, with a low-key shuffle beat that underlines the verses clashing with a more bombastic chorus". Kit Mackintosh, in a retrospective about technology in music, remarked that the song was "hard artifice as car crusher to the soul tradition, taking the voice [...] and flattening it into inhumanly rigid timbral geometrics", tying it to a larger trend of "human authenticity [being] automatised, and, ultimately, bastardised."

Singer T-Pain, known for his use of the same Auto-Tune effect that is featured prominently in "Pop Champagne", criticized the song, saying Browz did not understand how to use Auto-Tune correctly. Browz responded to the criticism in an interview, saying "I [...] did the record two days after I got the [Auto-Tune] plugin, you know what I mean? [The track] was hot. [...] That's my philosophy: If something is hot, it's hot, something is not, it's not. The two would later reconcile and release a collaborative single, "All The Way", in 2013, with Ron Browz dismissing their brief conflict as part of the competitive nature of hip hop and "good for the game".

Retrospectively, in a 2024 interview, Browz described the beat on "Pop Champagne" as the best he had ever created.

== Other remixes ==
Barack Obama is celebrated in a remix of "Pop Champagne".

In October 2008, another remix was released featuring Ludacris, Lil' Kim, and Swizz Beatz.

In November 2008, after the conclusion of that year's U.S. presidential election that led to Barack Obama's election as President of the United States, Ron Browz made a remix of "Pop Champagne" with rewritten lyrics referencing Obama, including the recurring line "We pop Champagne for Barack campaign." He also references Obama's campaign slogan of change, while clarifying that he intends "no disrespect to [John] McCain or [Sarah] Palin", Obama's then-political opponents. The remix also features rapper Busta Rhymes, who raps about his experience voting for Obama.

== Charts ==
=== Weekly charts ===
Chart (2008–2009)	Peak Position
US Billboard Hot 100	22
US Hot R&B/Hip-Hop Songs (Billboard)	3
US Rhythmic Airplay (Billboard)	8

=== Year-end charts ===
Chart (2009)	Position
US Billboard Hot 100	98
US Hot R&B/Hip-Hop Songs (Billboard)	36
US Rhythmic (Billboard)	39
