= The Nacirema Dream =

Studio album by Papoose
- Released: March 26, 2013
- Recorded: 2006–2013
- Genre: Hip hop
- Length: 75:51
- Label: Honorable Records
- Producers: Papoose (exec.); Antwan "Amadeus" Thompson; Buckwild; C4; Chemist; Dame Grease; Dan Dilemma; DJ Kay Slay; DJ NU; DJ Premier; Jay & Certifyd; Ron Browz; Skitzo; Streetrunner; The Heatmakerz; Tie Sticks

Papoose chronology
The Nacirema Dream (2013)	You Can't Stop Destiny (2015)

Singles from The Nacirema Dream
- 1. "On Top of My Game" Released: December 11, 2012; 2. "What's My Name" Released: March 5, 2013; 3. "Die Like a G" Released: June 17, 2013

The Nacirema Dream is the debut studio album by American rapper Papoose. The album was first announced to be released under Jive Records in 2006, but after many delays and label issues, it was released on March 26, 2013, through Honorable Records and Fontana Records. The album features guest appearances from Mobb Deep, Erykah Badu, Jim Jones, Jadakiss, Remy Ma, Mavado, DJ Premier and Ron Browz among others. The album was supported by the three singles "On Top of My Game" featuring Mavado, "What's My Name" featuring Remy Ma, and "Get At Me" featuring Ron Browz. Upon release the album received generally positive reviews and debuted at number 97 on the U.S. Billboard 200.

== Background ==
On August 24, 2006, his official website announced that he had signed with Jive Records in a deal worth $1.5 million. He also announced for the first time an album to be called The Nacirema Dream ("American" spelled backwards) was in the planning. However, in September 2007, DJ Kay Slay revealed that he and Papoose had left Jive, commenting that they had "almost [become] victims of A&R hell." This was due to Jive wanting Papoose to be a more commercial artist. He would say, "The business part and the politics of the game kinda got in the way. A lot of people were hitting me with ideas about doing this and that and got in the way. I can't really blame them, I blame myself for letting it happen." In December 2009 DJ Kay Slay would confirm the album was still coming.

In March 2012 when Papoose was asked if he would change the name of the album he responded with

This isn’t just an album for me. This is my life story. This is how I grew up in this country. The title of my album is Nacirema Dream. “Nacirema” is the word “American” spelled backwards. Some people get up to go to work. Some people hustle. People come from all different corners of the Earth, risk their life getting here in search of that American dream. My struggle growing up in Bed Stuy, Brooklyn, being successful in the music industry, and going through all the trials and tribulations I went through in my life - Nacirema Dream is a reflection of that. I can’t change my face when I look in the mirror. I can’t change my album title. This isn’t just an album title for entertainment. This is real! It won’t be changed. It’s definitely going to come out under that title.

Papoose has described the album as a "New York style album". The album according to Papoose details his struggle and is his life story. Some of the concepts of songs on the album date back to his time when he was with Jive, but all records have been updated and everything has been remixed and remastered and changed around. The album will contain 20 tracks with two skits. The track list was revealed on February 23, 2013.

== Songs ==
The working title for the first track "Intro" is "Attempted Assassination". Papoose said he was using the song "more as a preparing the listener for what type of album, what type of experience they [are] about to have. I’m just basically setting the stage then an interlude." The intro features samples from Barack Obama and Martin Luther King Jr. speeches. The third track "Mother Ghetto" is about loving and representing where you are from. Papoose being from Brooklyn, New York he said the song will give you and inside look to the city even if you have never been there. Papoose would say his Mobb Deep collaboration "Aim, Shoot" was recorded in 2012 even through the feud that went on between members Havoc and Prodigy. He also said they all recorded the song in the studio at the same time.

Papoose would go the record calling his collaboration with Erykah Badu, "Cure" to be his favorite song he has ever made, and said that he believes the song could "change the world." Erykah Badu would later claim that her vocals were from over 10 years ago, and were used without permission. He described the title track as "Uplifting", and said it is about following your dreams of what you want to do with your life. He would describe his verses in the song, "Pimpin' Won't Die" as continuations of Tupac's "Brenda's Got a Baby" and Slick Rick's "Children's Story". He described the Brenda's Got a Baby continuation as:

Brenda has her baby and the concept is basically giving you what happened after she left the baby in a trashcan and the child grew up. I basically do a continuation of that record. The child actually grows up to be a prostitute. The message in the record is that if somebody's out there prostituting then don't judge that person without knowing their background.

Papoose said with "6 a.m." he was trying to capture the feeling of the cops knocking at your door at six in the morning. All three rappers verses in the song, Papoose's, Jim Jones' and Jadakiss', detail what was going on the day and night before the event, with each verse ending when the cops are knocking. "Law Library 8" is the latest in a series of songs by Papoose, that break down the ins and outs, of different aspects of the law. In each of the "Law Library" songs he breaks down a different part of a case, this ranges from the arrest warrant to the trail proceedings. This version features a case on firearms. He called the second single, his collaboration with his wife rapper Remy Ma "a fun record" that features the husband and wife trading bars back and forth about love.

The fourteenth track, "Faith" is about having faith in your self. The main sample in the song is an Etta James song, this ties in that one of the major reasons the album was pushed back so much was due to sample clearance issues. Papoose called his collaboration with DJ Premier, "Turn it Up", "hip hop in its truest form", and his most important collaboration on the album. Premier does the intro to the song and handled the production. The song "Get At Me" which features and was produced by Ron Browz is about saying something to someone's face, rather than speaking behind their back about them.

The eighteenth track "Where I Come From" is a posse cut that features the members of his crew, which includes three of his family members. The song is an opportunity for them to showcase themselves on Papoose's debut album as they have been previously featured on his mixtapes. The next song "R.I.P." is Papoose's dedication to all the people he knew who have died. On February 1, 2013, Papoose premiered a preview of a sequel to his break out hit "Alphabetical Slaughter" on Tim Westwood TV.At the end of the original Papoose started rhyming the alphabet backwards before DJ Kay Slay "stops the track", which led to the anticipation for a sequel to the song. However Papoose wanted to save it for his debut album. He raps words beginning with Z to A while rhyming it all together through the record. He said the record took him a couple months for him to write.

== Guests and production ==
In 2007 Papoose indicated that DJ Premier, DR Period, Pharrell Williams and Kanye West would be handling production on the album. Also during his time signed to Jive Records producers such as, Scott Storch, Swizz Beatz, DJ Kay Slay, Focus... and E-Dubs were tied to the project. The album was also to include collaborations with rappers such as Bun B, Chamillionaire, Busta Rhymes, Young Buck and Tony Yayo.

Later Papoose would announce that Erykah Badu, Jim Jones, Jadakiss and Mobb Deep would have appearances on the project. In April 2012 Papoose said there is a song titled "What's My Name" that features his wife, Remy Ma that will be featured on the album. In a January 7, 2013, interview he would also reveal Ron Browz, C4 and The Heatmakerz as producers on the album. On March 15, 2013, he said that he had decided against using beats he had gotten from Kanye West, Pharrell and other mainstream producers on the album. The final track list also revealed production from Streetrunner, Dame Grease, Buckwild and Skitzo among others.

== Release and promotion ==
In promotion of the album, he has released various mixtapes including 21 Gun Salute, Papoose Season, King Of New York and the most recent one being Most Hated Alive which was released December 4, 2012. Most Hated Alive contained features from 2 Chainz, Styles P, Jadakiss, Kendrick Lamar as well as production from Ron Browz, Cool & Dre and E Dubb among others. Over all he has released 27 mixtapes over eight years prior to this album.

Over the years the album has been promised with delay resulting in Papoose releasing more mixtapes. He would announce the release date for The Nacirema Dream as March 5, 2013, which coincides with his birthday. This release date was however pushed back another three weeks until March 26, 2013. He is releasing the album on his own independent label to avoid a major record label from affecting his sound.

On February 16, 2013, Papoose released the first episode of a vlog series detailing his journey to the release of The Nacirema Dream. Through February and March 2013 he went on a radio tour doing interviews and freestyles on air in various markets.

== Singles ==
The first single released in promotion of the album was "On Top of My Game" which features Mavado on December 11, 2012. The music video was shot in Jamaica and premiered on Vevo on January 10, 2013. The second single is titled "What's My Name" which features his wife Remy Ma was released on March 5, 2013. The song features Papoose and Remy trading bars back and forth about "holding each other down". Remy was serving an eight-year jail sentence for assault, illegal weapon possession and attempted coercion in connection with these charges. The third single was announced as "Get At Me" featuring Ron Browz. Papoose crashed the stage at Hot 97's 2013 Summer Jam after Kendrick Lamar's set and performed the song. The music video was released for "Get At Me" on May 24, 2013.

On March 22, 2013, the music video was released for "Alphabetical Slaughter Part II / Z to A". The video begins with a girl singing the National Anthem while Papoose walks through a school past pictures of "graduates", such as legendary hip hop artists, Rakim, Tupac, The Notorious B.I.G., Big Pun and Nas. He then makes his way to a school class and takes younger versions of rappers like Lil Wayne, Drake, Jay-Z, Nicki Minaj, Trinidad James and Rick Ross "to school" with his lyrical abilities. On May 24, 2013, the music video was released for "Turn It Up" featuring DJ Premier. On June 26, 2013, the music video was released for "Faith". On March 4, 2014, the music video was released for "6am" featuring Jadakiss and Jim Jones.

== Commercial performance ==
The album debuted at number 97 on the U.S. Billboard 200 and number 13 on the US Billboard Top R&B/Hip-Hop Albums with first-week sales of 5,442 copies in the United States. In its second week the album sold 3,000 more copies bringing its total to 8,400. The album has sold 18,000 copies in the U.S. as of June 2015.

== Critical response ==
Professional ratings
Aggregate scores
Source	Rating
Metacritic	70/100
Review scores
Source	Rating
AllMusic	3.5/5 stars
Exclaim!	6/10
PopMatters	7/10 stars
RapReviews	6.5/10
XXL	3/5 (L)

The Nacirema Dream was met with generally positive reviews from music critics. Reed Jackson of XXL praised his storytelling, colorful metaphors and overtly complex word play. He also said, "The production is so outdated you can’t help but think that these songs have literally just been sitting around this whole time. But ultimately, The Nacirema Dream should be celebrated – not only for its long overdue release, but because Papoose actually made the album he had always planned on making". Logan Smithson of PopMatters gave the album a seven out of ten, saying "The Nacirema Dream is a prime example of how hip-hop can serve as a platform for storytelling. Papoose confirms that the hype around his lyrical prowess was real. However, the album isn’t without its faults. Coming out seven years behind schedule, the production is noticeably a little dated. While the beats are solid, The Nacirema Dream isn’t an album that you’ll be listening to because you want to hear great production. It also could have benefited from being slightly trimmed. Listeners might feel fatigued while sitting through the 75 minutes that this album has to offer. Regardless, The Nacirema Dream is an admirable achievement. Papoose fought through label issues and made the album that he wanted to make, even if it took him seven years to finally get that album out to the public". Del F. Cowie of Exclaim! gave the album a six out of ten, saying "Papoose gamely battles on, delivering some of his trademark punch lines, and you can tell he genuinely attempted to deliver a well-rounded record. However, there's not enough innovation to interest casual fans in the project".

David Jeffries of AllMusic gave the album three and a half stars out of five saying "What doesn't happen is that satisfying overall album flow, and when it comes to production, the highlights are mentioned above with the rest of the album sounding mixtape rough or just plain old. It might not be the grand arrival showcase that was expected but Papoose hasn't fallen off the "ones to watch" list quite yet, even when he's been on there longer than most anyone else". Grant Jones of RapReviews gave the album a 6.5 of 10, saying "The Nacirema Dream is as strong as any of Papoose's mixtapes, combining effective storytelling with displays of advanced lyricism is everything rap fans have come to expect from him. Much like fellow lyricists Canibus and Ras Kass, Papoose has been let down by some second-rate, mixtape-ish production. Whether it is a product of being stuck in mixtape territory for so long or having to work on a limited budget, The Nacerima Dream is neither dream nor nightmare. Whether you are a fan of Papoose or need convincing, you'll find something on here that you'll enjoy.

== Track listing ==
No.	Title	Writer(s)	Producer(s)	Length
1.	"Intro"	S. Mackie		1:39
2.	"Motion Picture" (featuring DJ Kay Slay)	S. Mackie; D. Blackman	Dame Grease	3:49
3.	"Mother Ghetto"	S. Mackie; R. Turner	Ron Browz	4:50
4.	"Aim, Shoot" (featuring Mobb Deep)	S. Mackie; A. Johnson; K. Muchita; T. Feld	Tie Sticks	3:34
5.	"Cure" (Skit)			3:06
6.	"Cure" (featuring Erykah Badu)	S. Mackie; E. Wright; A. Best	Buckwild	5:37
7.	"Nacirema Dream"	S. Mackie; G. Green; S. Thomas	The Heatmakerz	4:06
8.	"Pimpin' Won't Die"	S. Mackie	C4	4:33
9.	"6am" (featuring Jim Jones and Jadakiss)	S. Mackie; J. Jones; J. Phillips; N. Warwar	Streetrunner	4:00
10.	"Law Library" (Skit)			1:13
11.	"Law Library Part 8"	S. Mackie; D. Givera; J. Rivera	Jay & Certifyd	2:46
12.	"What's My Name" (featuring Remy Ma)	S. Mackie; R. Mackie; K. Gamble; A. Jackson	Dan Dilemma	3:04
13.	"On Top of My Game" (featuring Mavado)	S. Mackie; D. Brooks; T. Feld	Tie Sticks	4:09
14.	"Faith"	S. Mackie; C. Cobb	Chemist	2:32
15.	"Turn It Up" (featuring DJ Premier)	S. Mackie; C. Martin	DJ Premier	4:09
16.	"Die Like a G"	S. Mackie; A. Thompson	Antwan "Amadeus" Thompson	4:15
17.	"Get at Me" (featuring Ron Browz)	S. Mackie; R. Turner	Ron Browz	2:56
18.	"Where I Come From" (featuring Dada Stone, ODog, Manson, Kino and C-Brown)	S. Mackie; N. Padua	DJ NU	4:10
19.	"R.I.P."	S. Mackie; D. Rodriguez	Skitzo	5:12
20.	"Alphabetical Slaughter Part II / Z to A" (featuring DJ Kay Slay)	S. Mackie; N. Warwar; K. Grayson	Streetrunner; DJ Kay Slay	6:14
Total length:				75:51

== Chart history ==
Chart (2013)	Peak position
US Billboard 200	97
US Top R&B/Hip-Hop Albums (Billboard)	13
US Top Rap Albums (Billboard)	8
US Independent Albums (Billboard)	19

== Personnel ==
- Shamele William Mackie – primary artist, executive producer
- Albert Johnson – featured artist (track 4)
- Kejuan Muchita – featured artist (track 4)
- Erica Abi Wright – featured artist (track 6)
- Jason Terrance Phillips – featured artist (track 9)
- Joseph Guillermo Jones – featured artist (track 9)
- Reminisce Smith Mackie – featured artist (track 12)
- David Constantine Brooks – featured artist (track 13)
- Christopher Edward Martin – featured artist & producer (track 15)
- Rondell Edwin Turner – featured artist & producer (tracks: 3, 17)
- Kino – featured artist (track 18)
- O-Dog – featured artist (track 18)
- Manson – featured artist (track 18)
- C-Brown – featured artist (track 18)
- Dada Stone – featured artist (track 18)
- Eddie Cascio – keyboards & piano (tracks: 1, 6)
- DJ NVS Styles – scratches
- Damon Blackman – producer (track 2)
- Tyronne D. Feld – producer (tracks: 4, 13)
- Anthony Best – producer (track 6)
- Gregory "Rsonist" Green – producer (track 7)
- Sean "Thrilla" Thomas – producer (track 7)
- Christopher Joseph Forte – producer (track 8)
- Nicholas M. Warwar – producer (tracks: 9, 20)
- David Givera – producer (track 11)
- Josh Rivera – producer (track 11)
- Dan "Dilemma" Thomas – producer (track 12)
- Christopher "Chemist" Cobb – producer (track 14)
- Antwan "Amadeus" Thompson – producer (track 16)
- Nelson Padua – producer (track 18)
- Dario "Skitzo" Rodriguez – producer (track 19)
- Keith Grayson – producer (track 20)
- Glen Marchese – associate producer, mixing, mastering
- Sam Skrilla – art direction, design
- Jared Buschang – photography
- Ian Schwartzman – management
