= Pray IV Reign =

2009 album by Jim Jones

Studio album by Jim Jones
- Released: March 24, 2009
- Recorded: 2007–09
- Genre: Hip-hop
- Length: 74:45
- Labels: ByrdGang; Diplomat; E1; Columbia; Sony
- Producers: Jim Jones; Dame Dash; No I.D.; TrackSlayerz; Supa Dave West; Ron Browz; Chink Santana; Ryan Leslie; Magendo7; Young Yonny; Triple-A; Dangerous LLC; Chris Styles; Cylla; Young Seph; Illfonics

Jim Jones chronology
Hustler's P.O.M.E. (Product of My Environment) (2006)	Pray IV Reign (2009)	The Rooftop (2009)

Deluxe Edition cover

Singles from Pray IV Reign
- 1. "Pop Champagne" Released: September 4, 2008; 2. "Na Na Nana Na Na" Released: January 1, 2009; 3. "Precious" Released: March 3, 2009 (promotional single); 4. "Frenemies" Released: March 17, 2009 (promotional single)

Pray IV Reign is the fourth album by the American rapper Jim Jones, released on March 24, 2009, under ByrdGang Records, Diplomat Records, E1 Music, Columbia Records, and Sony Music Entertainment. The album is his first and only under a major record label. The album includes production from Ron Browz, Chink Santana, No I.D., Ryan Leslie, Michael Crawford, Triple-A and Young Seph. The album also features guest appearances from Ron Browz, Juelz Santana, NOE, Mel Matrix, Rell, Ludacris, Ryan Leslie, Chink Santana, Bree-Beauty, Rowana, Oshy, and Skull Gang's Starr.

== Background ==
The album, originally titled Back 2 Back, was his first album with Columbia Records. The album cover was photographed by Thi Chien. There are several different album covers. The first version is the original cover, the second, third and fourth are all the original cover, but with different colored backgrounds, such as red, green and blue. The fifth cover is the Deluxe Edition with a close up of Jim Jones' face.

== Music ==
In a 2008 listening session, a few tracks were revealed. The "Intro" was originally titled "Across 110th Street" and "How to Be a Boss" was originally titled "Follow this Blueprint". On the sixth track, titled "Frienemies", Jones' addresses his strained relationships with Cam'ron and Max B. "My My My" is a song he recorded his deceased friend Stack Bundles. Jim Jones says he likes to call this track "Emotionless Pt. 2", referring to a previous single of his taken from his third album Hustler's P.O.M.E. (2006). According to Jim Jones, "My My My" is one of the hardest songs for him perform because of his emotions. The passing of friend and fellow American rapper Stack Bundles, was one of the main inspirations for the album Pray IV Reign.

A track that was rumored to be on the album was the remix to MGMT's "Electric Feel":

They did a show [at United Palace Theater] up in Washington Heights, the initial conversation was just that it was an honor to meet them, I think they're kinna cool. And from there it led into me saying, It'd be crazy if I remixed "Electric Feel". They were like, Yeah, that would be crazy. So I said, Let me get the beats and shit.

== Release and promotion ==
On July 8, 2008, Jones' released a song titled "The Good Shit", featuring production from Ron Browz and a guest appearance from fellow ByrdGang member NOE. It was intended to be the album's first single when it was titled Back 2 Back, but was instead used for promotional purposes.

"Pop Champagne", a song Jones recorded with Ron Browz and Dipset cohort Juelz Santana, was leaked online in the summer of 2008. It quickly became a club banger and hit single, peaking at #22 on the Billboard Hot 100. The song was released as the album's lead single on September 4, 2008. The song proved to be Jones' second most successful single to date, behind his 2006 hit "We Fly High".

In October 2008, Jim Jones released a promotional video for the album, rapping his verse on his remix to Kid Cudi's "Day 'n' Nite". Jim Jones initially wanted to release the album on December 9, which was coincidentally the same date Jay-Z was going to release The Blueprint 3 and 50 Cent was going to release Before I Self Destruct.

To promote the album, Jones worked with Damon Dash and director J. Kyle Manzay to stage the play Hip-Hop Monologues: Inside the Life and Mind of Jim Jones. The “Hip-Hop Monologues” is a musical theatrical experience, co-written by Jim Jones, using the music from Pray IV Reign, as the platform. An ensemble of professional actors portray various characters from Jones’ past, while Jones performed his new songs in the context of a scripted story. The two-day only play pulled in a packed audience of fans, media, and celebrities. Infused with a live band the performance "Gives you that live instrumentation feel — more like a real Broadway type of feel as opposed to just seeing a hip-hop track. So, you’ll get to hear both the real music from off of the album and then the band comes in and it takes over and it gives you that really funky feeling" said Jones of the play.

On January 1, 2009, a song titled "Na Na Nana Na Na" was premiered and on February 17, was released to iTunes. It serves as the album's second single and features up-and-coming singer Brittney Taylor AKA Bree-Beauty. Jim Jones also teamed up with BET, to promote the album as well. On March 2, 2009, Jim Jones appeared on BET's 106 & Park to premiere the music video for "Na Na Nana Na Na". Later on in the show he announced that from March 2 to March 24, he would be announcing a new item out of his "Swag Bag". The goal for the fans was to keep track of all the items announced each day and once you've collected all the items, you had to log on to BET.com/JimJones on Friday, March 20 to enter the contest for a chance to win Jim Jones’ "Swag Bag". Who ever entered all 24 items correctly won the "Swag Bag" and its items.

Jones partnered with iTunes, which had a "Countdown to Jim Jones Pray IV Reign". On February 17, they released the second single "Na Na Nana Na Na". On March 3, they released "Precious" featuring vocals and production from Ryan Leslie, on March 17, the song titled "Frenemies" was released, and on March 24, the entire album was released. The lead single from Pray IV Reign, "Pop Champagne", which spent two weeks as America's #1 urban single, was also incorporated into the countdown and was already available for sale.

== Reception ==
=== Critical response ===
Professional ratings
Review scores
Source	Rating
Allmusic	4/5 stars
Artistdirect	3/5 stars
Beats Per Millennium	(5.3/10)
Entertainment Weekly	(C+)
HipHopDX	3.5/5 stars
PREFIXMAG.Com	(4/10)
RapReviews	(8/10)
Slant	2.5/5 stars
Spin	3/5 stars
XXL	(XL)

XXL gave the album a 4/5, stating that the album is an extreme improvement with many heartfelt tracks, but many disappointments. XXL complimented the lead single, "Pop Champagne", "My My My", and the promo singles "Precious" and "Frenemies", but disliked the second single "Na Na Nana Na Na", "Pop Off" and "This Is the Life".

Alex Thornton of HopHopDX liked the songs "How to Be a Boss" with Ludacris saying it stole the show, "Precious" with Ryan Leslie and "My My My". He also liked the lead single "Pop Champagne" but like most critics he hated the second single "Na Na Nana Na Na"

=== Commercial performance ===
The album debuted at #9 on the Billboard 200 with 42,982 copies sold in its first week released.

== Track listing ==
No.	Title	Writer(s)	Producer(s)	Length
1.	"Intro" (featuring Starr)	Andre Parker, Aqueelah McCummings, Ernest Wilson, Gene McDaniels, Joseph Jones	No I.D., Chink Santana (co.)	5:14
2.	"Pulling Me Back" (featuring Chink Santana)	Charles Bobino III, Demetri Duncan, Dexter Randall, Jones, Parker	TrackSlayerz, Chink Santana (co.)	3:45
3.	"Let It Out"	Dave West, Jones	Supa Dave West	4:08
4.	"How to Be a Boss" (featuring Ludacris and NOE)	Duane Bridgeford, Christopher Bridges, Jones, Rondell Turner	Ron Browz	5:07
5.	"Medicine" (featuring NOE and Chink Santana)	Bridgeford, Jones, Parker	Chink Santana	5:36
6.	"Frienemies"	Ernest Isley, Christopher Jasper, Jones, Marvin Isley, O'Kelly Isley, Parker, Ronald Isley, Rudolph Isley	Chink Santana	4:16
7.	"Precious" (featuring Ryan Leslie)	Anthony Leslie, Jones, Parker	Ryan Leslie	4:10
8.	"Blow the Bank" (featuring Oshy and Starr)	Jones, Michael Crawford, Thomas Byrd	Magnedo7	3:46
9.	"This Is for My Bitches" (featuring Oshy)	Byrd, Jones, Ronald Ferebee, Jr.	Young Yonny	3:44
10.	"Girlfriend" (featuring Juelz Santana and Oshy)	Bridgeford, Byrd, Jones, LaRon James, Parker	Chink Santana	4:51
11.	"This Is the Life" (featuring Starr)	Bridgeford, Charles King, McCummings, Jones, Andre Atkins, Michael Floyd	Triple-A	4:18
12.	"My My My" (featuring Rawana)	Ayinde Thomas, Jones, Teraike Crawford	Chris Styles, Cylla, Dangerous LLC	4:28
13.	"Pop Off" (featuring NOE and Mel Matrix)	Bridgeford, Jones, Joseph Holmes	Young Seph	4:12
14.	"Pop Champagne" (with Ron Browz featuring Juelz Santana)	James, Jones, Turner	Ron Browz	3:35
15.	"Rain" (featuring Rell, NOE, and Starr)	Bridgeford, Gerrell Gaddis, Jones, Turner	Ron Browz	5:33
16.	"Na Na Nana Na Na" (featuring Bree-Beauty)	Bridgeford, Brittney Taylor, Jed Cappelli, Jones, Matthew Friedman	ILLFONICS	3:59

Japan bonus tracks
No.	Title	Writer(s)	Producer(s)	Length
17.	"Uptown" (featuring Rell)	Jones	Chink Santana	4:29
18.	"The Good Stuff" (featuring Mel Matrix)	Jones	Ron Browz	3:56

Sample credits

- "Intro" contains a interpolations from the composition of "Sunday and Sister Jones", taken from Quiet Fire, written by Gene McDaniels, as performed by Roberta Flack.
- "Frienemies" contains an interpolations from the composition of "Ballad for the Fallen Soldier" as performed by The Isley Brothers.
- The instrumental for "This Is the Life" was originally used by Yung Berg and Ray J on a song, titled "Exotic".
- "Jackin' Swagga from Us" contains a sampling elements from "Paper Planes" as performed by M.I.A., and is an alternative version of "Swagga Like Us", a collaborative song of T.I. and Jay-Z (featuring Lil Wayne and Kanye West), taken from T.I.'s album, Paper Trail (2008).

== Charts ==
Chart (2009)	Peak position
U.S. Billboard 200	9
U.S. Billboard Top R&B/Hip-Hop Albums	2
U.S. Billboard Top Rap Albums	1

== Pray IV Reign: The Mixtape ==
Pray IV Reign: The Mixtape

Mixtape by Jim Jones
- Released: March 3, 2009
- Recorded: 2008–2009
- Genre: Hip hop
- Labels: Columbia, Sony
- Producers: Harley Is Majik, Ryan Leslie

Jim Jones chronology
Jim Jones & Skull Gang Present A Tribute To Bad Santa Starring Mike Epps (2008)	Pray IV Reign: The Mixtape (2009)	Pray IV Reign (2009)

Jim Jones released a mixtape, titled Pray IV Reign: The Mixtape, on March 3, 2009, to promote the album. Most of the songs on the mixtape are tracks that failed to make the album's final track listing.

=== Track listing ===
No.	Title	Producer	Length
1.	"Trippin" (featuring Laylee)		4:44
2.	"Shorty" (featuring NOE and Rell)		5:39
3.	"Religion"	Harley Is Majik	5:22
4.	"Medicine" (featuring NOE and Chink Santana)		5:36
5.	"Fast Money" (featuring Mel Matrix and Sandman)		4:02
6.	"Uptown" (featuring Rell)		4:27
7.	"Precious" (featuring Ryan Leslie)	Ryan Leslie	4:10
8.	"My Life" (featuring Chink Santana and NOE)		5:50
9.	"Catch Up" (featuring Oshy)		2:28

=== Charts ===
Chart (2009)	Peak position
U.S. Top Rap Albums	11
U.S. Top R&B/Hip-Hop Albums	38
