= D.O.A. (Death of Auto-Tune) =

Single by Jay-Z

from the album The Blueprint 3
- Released: June 5, 2009 (airplay)
- Recorded: 2009
- Studio: Avex Honolulu Studios (Honolulu, Hawaii)
- Genre: Hip hop; rap rock
- Length: 4:15
- Label: Roc Nation; Atlantic
- Songwriters: Shawn Carter; Ernest Wilson; Garrett DeCarlo; Dale Frashuer; Paul Leka; Janko Nilović; Dave Sucky
- Producer: No I.D.

Jay-Z singles chronology
"Lost+ / Viva la Vida" (Live at the 51st Annual Grammy Awards) (2009)	"D.O.A. (Death of Auto-Tune)" (2009)	"Run This Town" (2009)

Audio sample
- "D.O.A. (Death of Auto-Tune)": file; help

Music video
- "D.O.A. (Death of Auto-Tune)" on YouTube

"D.O.A. (Death of Auto-Tune)" is a song written by American rapper Jay-Z and produced by No I.D. The song was released as a digital download on June 23, 2009, and as the first single from Jay-Z's 11th studio album, The Blueprint 3. The song made its world premiere on the New York radio station Hot 97 on June 5. Its lyrics address the overusage of Auto-Tune in the music industry. The song samples "In the Space" by the Montenegrin composer Janko Nilović. The bridge is inspired by Steam's "Na Na Hey Hey Kiss Him Goodbye" and interpolates lyrics from Kanye West's "Big Brother", and "You're Nobody (Till Somebody Kills You)" by The Notorious B.I.G. The song won Jay-Z his eighth Grammy Award, and his second for Best Rap Solo Performance. It peaked at No. 24 on Billboard Hot 100.

== Writing and inspiration ==
Before making "D.O.A. (Death of Auto-Tune)", Kanye West and Jay-Z had recorded an Auto-Tune song. However, Kanye heard the instrumental by No I.D. and thought about making an anti-Auto-Tune song. They then removed all the songs that contained Auto-Tune from The Blueprint 3 to further their point. Jay-Z himself stated that the point of the song was to "draw a line in the sand", saying that while he appreciated the use of the Auto-Tune by artists with an ear for melody like T-Pain and Kanye West, far too many people had jumped onto the technology and were using it as a crutch. One of the partial inspirations for Jay-Z to write the song was hearing Auto-Tune being used in an advertisement for Wendy's fast-food chain. It made him feel that what was once a trend had become a gimmick. The title is also a reference to the medical term "D.O.A." or "Dead on Arrival". The song makes a reference to The Notorious B.I.G. song "You're Nobody ('Till Somebody Kills You)". Jay-Z sampled a portion of The Notorious B.I.G.'s freestyle "Wake Up Show Freestyle".

== Music video ==
On June 27, 2009, a trailer for the video was released. The music video (directed by Anthony Mandler) was shot and aired immediately after the 2009 BET Awards on June 28.The video shows Jay in scenes such as a deserted factory building, a bar with a band, and playing card games in a kitchen. Actor Harvey Keitel cameos in the video as a card player in the kitchen of New York's exclusive restaurant, Rao's. Basketball player LeBron James also makes a cameo appearance. The video also shown the destruction of objects including large necklaces emblazoned with giant 'A's for “Auto-Tune” along with bright, retro-inspired clothes and boxes of Auto-Tune.

The video was nominated for Best Male Video and Best Hip-Hop Video at the 2009 MTV Video Music Awards. It did not win either of the categories, losing to T.I.'s "Live Your Life" and Eminem's "We Made You" respectively.

The video ranked at #17 on BET's Notarized: Top 100 Videos of 2009 countdown.

== Responses ==
On June 9, R&B artist Trey Songz released an unofficial remix of the song on his blog. Renamed "Death of Autotune Kellz", it was directed at artist R. Kelly for using the effect on a previous mixtape. Rappers AZ and Jay Rock have also both recorded remixes. Royce da 5'9" has released two remixes of it, one by himself and one with fellow Slaughterhouse members Joe Budden, Crooked I, and Joell Ortiz. Singer Avery Storm has also made a remix using the songs instrumental supporting the death of auto-tune. Bone Thugs-N-Harmony have also made a remix to the song featuring all five members. Rapper The Game released a diss track in response to the song entitled "I'm So Wavy (Death of Hov)", going at Jay-Z for what Game perceives as him being behind the times in the hip-hop industry, and his stance that Jay-Z being 39 years old means he's too old to stay in the music scene, evidenced with lyrics such as "D.O.A.? No. T-Pain stays, old nigga goes." DJ Webstar was also critical of Jay-Z for the track in an interview with RealTalkNY, saying:

Jay-Z, he has a lot of fans, he's done a lot for hip-hop. Just because you're rich and you have more money than a lot of new artists coming up, such as myself, doesn't mean everything you say is right. I'm a fan of Jay-Z. I was shocked when he did that. Mary J and Drake just did a song with Auto-Tune. Drake and the whole Young Money just did Auto-Tune. If you take every song off the radio, what would you have? I was listening to the radio and Jay said the people don't wanna hear Auto-Tune no more. The biggest records of the year all had Auto-Tune — who are you to say people don't wanna hear it?

In an October interview with Tim Westwood, Lil Wayne also criticized the track, throwing support toward T-Pain as a known user of it:

Stop it, stop it. No, there's no such thing as 'Death of Auto-Tune'. T-Pain is my dude. He's on everybody's single. He's been on everybody's single, and he had auto-tune on every single one of them. So, every song I do with him, he better have auto-tune on it. I love it. Keep your auto-tune popping. Auto-tune ain't dead. You've got the whole game using that.

On August 31, 2009, the music group Bone Thugs-n-Harmony recorded a remix of the song. It was released officially on their MySpace page. The song includes the 5 united members singing separate verses along with Jay-Z singing the original chorus. The song has also been remixed by rappers such as Lil Wayne and Asher Roth.

The song was ranked best song of the year 2009 by MTV.

Time magazine ranked it number 8 on their list of the best songs of 2009.

== Live performances ==
Two days after the song premiered on Hot 97, Jay-Z made an appearance at the annual Summer Jam concert at Giants Stadium and performed the song live for the first time. Towards the end of his set, he was surprised by the appearance of T-Pain who joined him onstage. He later performed "D.O.A. (Death of Auto-Tune)" during the 2009 BET Awards.

== Charts ==
The song made a "Hot Shot Debut" at #24 on the Billboard Hot 100 based on downloads. It has also reached the top 50 of the Hot R&B/Hip-Hop Songs, peaking at #43.

Chart (2009)	Peak position
UK Singles Chart*	79
U.S. Billboard Hot 100	24
U.S. Billboard Hot R&B/Hip-Hop Songs	43
U.S. Billboard Hot Rap Tracks	15

- * No official release; charted due to downloads only

== Certifications ==
Region	Certification	Certified units/sales
United States (RIAA)	Gold	500,000^{‡}
^{‡} Sales+streaming figures based on certification alone.
