= Arab Money =

Single by Busta Rhymes featuring Ron Browz

from the album Back on My B.S.
- Released: October 14, 2008
- Genre: Hip-hop; hip house
- Length: 2:47
- Label: Flipmode; Universal Motown
- Songwriters: Trevor Smith, Jr.; Rondell Turner
- Producers: Busta Rhymes; Ron Browz

Busta Rhymes singles chronology
| "We Made It" (2008) | "Arab Money" (2008) | "Rotate" (2009) |

Ron Browz singles chronology
| "Pop Champagne" (2008) | "Arab Money" (2008) | "Jumping (Out the Window)" (2008) |

"Arab Money" is a song by American rapper Busta Rhymes, released as the lead single from his eighth studio album Back on My B.S. (2009). It features production and vocals by fellow New York-based rapper and producer Ron Browz.

== Music video ==
The music video debuted on BET's 106 & Park on December 2, 2008. It is directed by Rik Cordero. It features cameos from Rick Ross, Spliff Star, DJ Drama, Jim Jones, Juelz Santana, DJ Khaled, Akon, Gorilla Zoe, Soulja Boy Tell 'Em, N.O.R.E., Lil Wayne, Kardinal Offishall, Ace Hood, Shawty Lo, Paul Wall, E-40, Jadakiss, Swizz Beatz, T-Pain, Wiz Khalifa, Mack Maine, Tyga, Triple C's, donda west, and many others.

New York City businessman and philanthropist Ali Naqvi stars as the Arab prince of the music video. Ali is actually of Persian and Indian descent. Ali, friend of Busta Rhymes, was invited to appear in the music video. Ali is Founder and Chairman of MindShare Ventures Group. The song makes reference to Yasser Arafat and Al-Waleed bin Talal.

The music video for the first part of the remix was released on February 25, 2009. Just like the original, it was directed by Rik Cordero in front of a green screen. T-Pain is not featured in the video, and the chorus is changed back to the original. No Arabic words were used. T.I., Birdman, and Cedric the Entertainer make cameo appearances in the video.

The music video for the second part of the remix was released on February 27, two days after the 1st part of the remix's video. Just like the original, it was directed by Rik Cordero in front of a green screen. Reek da Villian is not featured in the video.

== In other media ==
The song is heavily featured in the 2009 video game Grand Theft Auto: The Ballad of Gay Tony as the favorite song of the eccentric property developer Yusuf Amir and also appears on the in-game radio station The Beat 102.7. It is also featured in the 2013 video game Grand Theft Auto Online to accompany the return of Yusuf Amir in the 2023 Chop Shop update.

== Remixes ==
The song was officially remixed three times by Busta Rhymes, with different guest appearances accompanying each version.

=== Part 1 ===
The first part of the remix features Ron Browz, P. Diddy, Swizz Beatz, T-Pain, Akon and Lil Wayne. The song was released on Thanksgiving Day (November 27, 2008). Ron Browz, T-Pain, Akon and Lil Wayne all use the Auto-Tune effect in it.

Also, in this part, Busta Rhymes does the main part of the hook differently and Ron Browz pronounced Arab money differently with an accent on the "A"s. Therefore, /ˈeɪræb/ AY-rab would be pronounced /ˈɑːrɑːb/ AH-rahb. Unlike the original, actual Arabic is used in the chorus and by the artists in their verses:

- Chorus: "Bismillāhi r-raḥmāni r-raḥīm. Al ḥamdu lillāhi rabbi l-'ālamīn"
  - Translation: "In the name of God, most Gracious most Merciful. All Praise is due to God, Lord of the worlds.
  - The chorus used in video is the same chorus as the original.
- Busta Rhymes: "As-Salamu Alaykum Warahmatullah Wa Barakatu"
  - Translation: "May Peace and blessings of God be upon you" (A Greeting)
  - What was used in the video: "While I stack another billion and give it to the block fool"
- Diddy: "Al hamdu lillah"
  - Translation: "All Praises to God"
  - What they rhymed the phrase with: "With my billions pilin'"
- Swizz Beatz: "Habibi"
  - Translation: "My Love (Masculine Form)"
  - What they rhymed the phrase with: "While she feedin' me linguine"
- Akon: "Bismillāhi r-raḥmāni r-raḥīm"
  - Translation: "In the name of God, most gracious most merciful."
  - What they rhymed the phrase with: "Straight cash when I come in, let me exchange the currency cause it's all foreign"

This version was planned for inclusion on Ron Browz's as-yet-unreleased debut album, Etherboy, but the album was shelved. This video ranked at number 86 on BET's Notarized: Top 100 Videos of 2009 countdown.

=== Part 2 ===
The second part of the remix features Ron Browz, Reek da Villian, Rick Ross, Spliff Star, N.O.R.E., and Red Café. The song was released on December 13, 2008.

=== Part 3 ===
The third part of the remix features Ron Browz, Juelz Santana, Jim Jones, and Jadakiss. The song was released on December 21, 2008. This remix is the only one to not feature a music video.

Two other versions of the song were produced, the first one featured the rapper Pitbull and the second featured Rick Ross.

== Track listings ==
Digital download

Explicit

1. "Arab Money" – 2:47

Clean

1. "Arab Money" – 2:47

U.S. promo CDS

1. "Arab Money" (radio) – 2:47
2. "Arab Money" (dirty) – 2:47
3. "Arab Money" (instrumental) – 2:47
4. "Arab Money" (acapella clean) – 2:37
5. "Arab Money" (acapella dirty) – 2:37

== Charts ==
Chart performance for "Arab Money"
| Chart (2008) | Peak position |
|---|---|
| US Billboard Hot 100 | 86 |
| US Hot R&B/Hip-Hop Songs (Billboard) | 31 |
| US Hot Rap Songs (Billboard) | 9 |
| US Pop 100 (Billboard) | 79 |
| US Rhythmic Airplay (Billboard) | 30 |

== Reception ==
Felipe Delermo, speaking with The Fader, described "Arab Money" as part of a string of similar-sounding Ron Browz-produced, Auto-Tune-filled hits, alongside "Pop Champagne" and "Jumping (Out the Window)", saying that all three "sound like they could have been made during the same studio session", a sameness which he assessed would hurt Browz's longevity as a producer.

=== Controversy ===
The themes and lyrics of "Arab Money" ignited controversy, particularly from Muslim communities. Music commentator Eric Ducker noted that Browz sings "non-sensical Arabic" in the chorus, which he described as "bothersome". He described the use of the faux-Arabic as being "culturally equivalent to doing a song involving China and having the hook be: Ching chang ching chong chong."

The released remix came with even stronger negative reactions, as it quotes lines from the Quran, which (in such a form) is deemed forbidden in most Arab countries. DJ Steve Sutherland of Galaxy FM was suspended temporarily when he played the song and listeners complained. In response, Busta (a Muslim himself) stated:

Sometimes, people like to twist things. We ain't mockin' the culture. We ain't tryin' to be disrespectful. Ain't no racism going on right here. If you listen to the song, you see that we are actually acknowledging the fact that the Arabian culture, a Middle East culture is one of the few cultures, that value passing down hard work riches that's been built amongst the family. It would be nice if a lot of other cultures did the same thing. Feel me? So, I would like for it to be like that in my culture where we could build things to the point where we got so much that we don't need to rely on other cultures to contribute majorly in a financial way, or in whatever other way, to societies, communities or whatever governments we might live in. So, we are actually biggin' up the culture. At the end of the day, I want to be like that. I think a lot of us want to be like that.
