= Papoose (rapper) =

American rapper (born 1978)

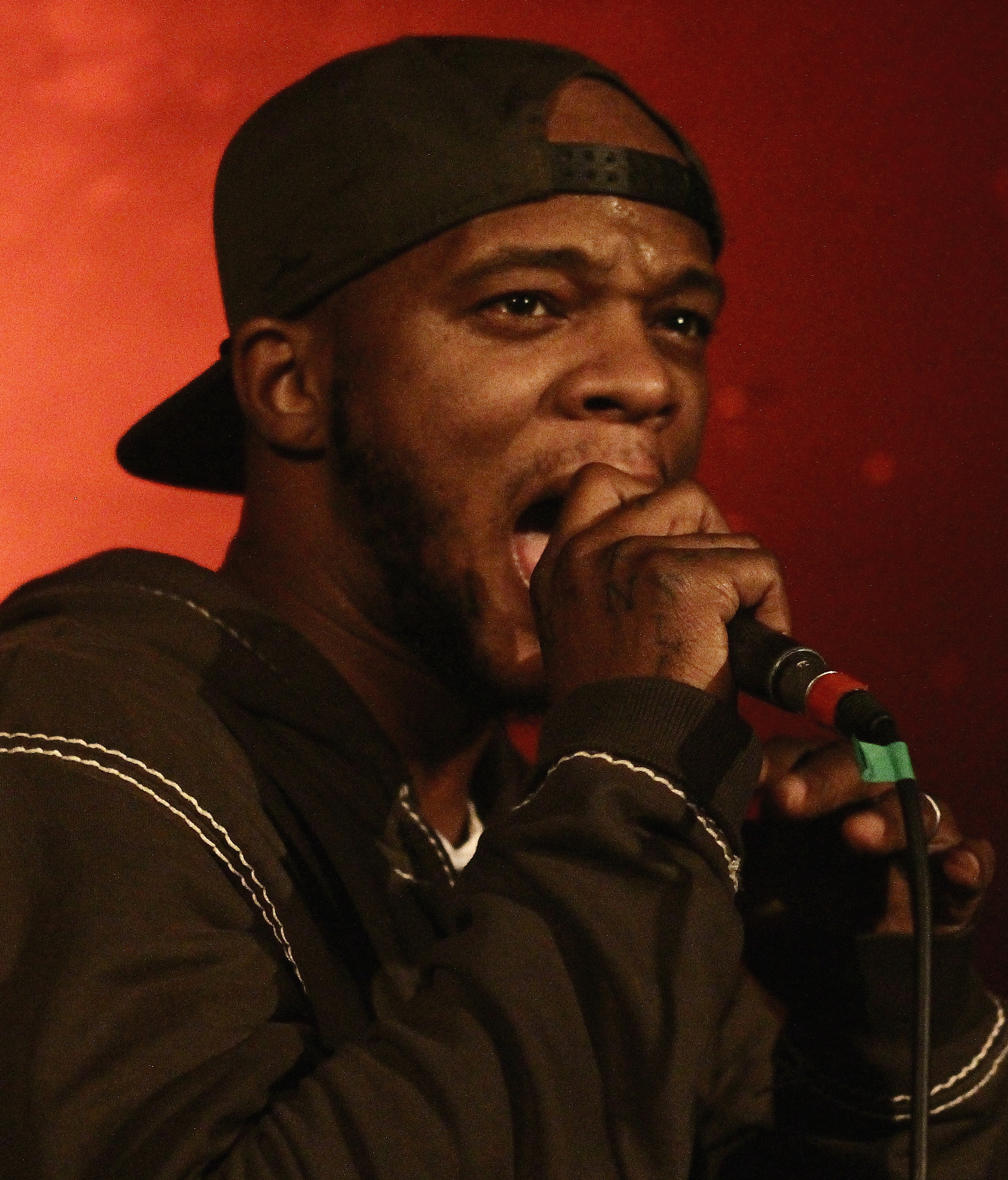
- Papoose performing in 2013

Background information
- Born: Shamele Mackie; March 5, 1978 (age 48); Brooklyn, New York City, U.S.
- Genres: Hip-hop, freestyle rap
- Occupations: Rapper; songwriter
- Years active: 1998–present
- Labels: Honorable; Streetsweepers; Jive; Flipmode Squad
- Formerly of: Flipmode Squad
- Spouse: Remy Ma (m. 2008; sep. 2024)
- Partner: Claressa Shields (since 2025)
- Website: papooseofficial.com

Shamele Mackie (born March 5, 1978), known professionally as Papoose (/pæˈpuːs/), is an American rapper. Known for his freestyles and prolific mixtape output, Papoose began his career in 1998 and has released 4 studio albums and 29 mixtapes.

Born in New York, Mackie made his recording debut on Kool G Rap's 1998 album Roots of Evil. Papoose produced and distributed his own mixtapes during the early 2000s, and signed with Jive Records to record his debut studio album, The Nacirema Dream from 2005 to 2006. It failed to release in the latter year due to label conflicts, although it was released independently in 2013 and entered the Billboard 200. His second album, You Can't Stop Destiny (2015), followed thereafter.

== Early life ==
Shamele Mackie was born on March 5, 1978. He was raised in the Bedford–Stuyvesant neighborhood of Brooklyn. While an early rumor stated that his ancestry traced back to Liberia, a matrilineal DNA test through African Ancestry, Inc. revealed that he actually descends from the Tikar people living in present-day Cameroon. The nickname "Papoose" was given to him by his grandmother for his resemblance as a baby to a Native American child.

== Career ==
=== Beginnings (1998–2004) ===
In 1998, Papoose made his rap debut on Kool G Rap's Roots of Evil album. In 2004, he released his debut single, "Thug Connection", which featured the b-side "Alphabetical Slaughter". Select Records offered him an eight-album deal, which he rejected.

=== Breakthrough, independent mixtapes (2005–2012) ===
After a stint at Rikers Island, Papoose began producing and selling mixtapes independently, one of which he presented to DJ Kay Slay outside the offices of New York's Hot 97, who then invited Papoose onto his radio show. Impressed by his rendition of "Alphabetical Slaughter", Kay Slay signed him to his Streetsweepers imprint. Papoose continued to release mixtapes at a prolific rate, over a dozen between 2004 and 2006, and won the Justo Mixtape Award for Best Underground Artist in 2005. During this time, he became associated with Busta Rhymes's Flipmode Squad, appearing on the remix of "Touch It".

On August 24, 2006, Papoose announced that he had signed with Jive Records in a deal worth $1.5 million. and was planning his debut album, The Nacirema Dream. In September 2007, Kay Slay revealed that he and Papoose had left Jive, saying that they had "almost (became) victims of A&R hell." Papoose continued to release his work independently, dropping nine mixtapes between 2007 and 2012. On the 2009 mixtape 21 Gun Salute, Papoose admitted that he was able to keep the $1.5 million from Jive, despite not releasing an album.

=== The Nacirema Dream, You Can't Stop Destiny (2012–2015) ===
After seven years of development and 27 mixtapes in all, Papoose secured a deal with Fontana Distribution to release his debut album The Nacirema Dream. The album was released on March 26, 2013, to positive reviews from music critics and debut at number 97 on the U.S. Billboard 200. It was preceded by the single "On Top of My Game", featuring Mavado.

On June 2, 2013, Papoose "crashed" Hot 97's Summer Jam with the help of Top Dawg Entertainment, performing The Nacirema Dream's third single "Get At Me" with Ron Browz. Following the release of "Control", Papoose took offence to Kendrick Lamar claiming the title of "King of New York" and dissed him in a remix of the track. Lamar called Papoose's response "comical" and threw shots back at him during the BET Hip Hop Awards cypher. On October 4, 2013, Papoose responded by saying that Lamar would never be "able to shine my shoes, lyrically" and that he was planning to release another diss track on an upcoming mixtape.

On November 4, 2013, Papoose released Hoodie Season his first mixtape since his debut album. He would release two more mixtapes, Hoodie Season 2 and Cigar Society, before releasing his second studio album You Can't Stop Destiny on July 17, 2015.

=== Television career and Underrated (2015–present) ===
Following the release of his wife Remy Ma from New York State prison in 2014 , the couple joined the cast of VH1's Love & Hip Hop: New York for its sixth season after receiving "an offer they couldn't refuse". He continued to appear on the show in seasons seven and eight, before being promoted to the main cast in seasons nine and ten. He also starred in the spin-off show Remy & Papoose: Meet the Mackies, and in the specials Remy & Papoose: A Merry Mackie Holiday, Dirty Little Secrets and The Love Edition. In conjunction with the show, Papoose released the song "Black Love", a tribute to his relationship with Remy.

On February 15, 2019, Papoose released his third studio album, Underrated. In January 2023, he was hired by digital distributor TuneCore. In September 2026, amid his divorce with Remy Ma, Papoose released the song "Jezebel", where he uses the biblical figure to diss his estranged wife, accusing her of narcissism and infidelity.

== Personal life ==
He is the cousin of the record producer Pi'erre Bourne.

Papoose has two children with ex-girlfriend Yvetta Lashley. Dejanae Mackie, born November 1996, and Shamele Mackie, born April 1999. He also has a daughter, Destiny, born September 2000.

On May 12, 2008, Papoose married rapper Remy Ma over the phone while she was incarcerated. They later had a formal ceremony, which was featured in the sixth season finale of Love & Hip Hop: New York in early 2016. She gave birth to the couple's first child together, daughter Reminisce Mackenzie, on December 14, 2018.

On May 22, 2025, Papoose filed for divorce in New York, citing irreconcilable differences. In the filing, he accused Remy Ma of engaging in extramarital affairs with multiple people, including battle rapper Eazy The Block Captain and an unidentified woman Remy Ma allegedly met during her incarceration. The breakup has garnered significant media attention due to the couple's previously publicized relationship and subsequent accusations exchanged between the two. Following his split with Remy Ma, Papoose began a relationship with female professional boxer Claressa Shields.

== Discography ==
Studio albums

- The Nacirema Dream (2013)
- You Can't Stop Destiny (2015)
- Underrated (2019)
- Endangered Species (2020)

== Filmography ==
- Righteous Kill (2008)
- Love & Hip Hop: New York (2015–2020)
- Remy & Papoose: Meet the Mackies (2018)
