= Big L discography =

- Studio albums: 2
- Extended plays: 2
- Live albums: 1
- Compilation albums: 7
- Singles: 7
- Music videos: 4
- Posthumous albums: 3
- Collaborative albums: 3

The complete discography of Big L, an American hip hop artist, consists of two studio albums, four posthumous albums, six compilation albums, two extended plays, three collaborative albums one live album, four music videos, and seven singles. His first album, Lifestylez ov da Poor & Dangerous, was released in 1995. In the US, it peaked at number 149 on the Billboard 200 and number 22 on R&B/Hip-Hop Albums.

== Albums ==
=== Studio albums ===
List of studio albums, with selected chart positions
Title	Album details	Peak chart positions				Sales	Certifications
Title	Album details	US	US R&B	US Rap	UK	Sales	Certifications
Lifestylez ov da Poor & Dangerous	Released: March 28, 1995; Label: Columbia / Sony; Formats: CD, LP, cassette, digital download	149	22	—	—	US: 200,000	

=== Posthumous albums ===
List of posthumous albums, with selected chart positions
Title	Album details	Peak chart positions				Sales	Certifications
Title	Album details	US	US R&B	US Rap	UK	Sales	Certifications
The Big Picture	Released: August 1, 2000; Label: Rawkus / MCA / Universal / Flamboyant; Formats: CD, LP, Cassette, digital download	13	2	—	122	US: 500,000	RIAA: Gold
139 and Lenox	Released: September 21, 2010; Label: Flamboyant Entertainment; Formats: CD, LP	—	—	—	—	—	—
The Danger Zone	Released: May 31, 2011; Label: RBC Records; Formats: CD, digital download	—	—	—	—	—	—
Harlem's Finest: Return of the King	Released: October 31, 2025; Label: Mass Appeal; Formats: CD, digital download	—	—	—	—	—	—

=== Compilation albums ===
List of compilation albums, with selected chart positions
Title	Album details	Peak chart positions			
Title	Album details	US	US R&B	US Rap	UK
Harlem's Finest – A Freestyle History	Released: November 27, 2001; Label: Corleone 531 Records; Formats: CD, LP (Promo)	—	—	—	—
Harlem's Finest - A Freestyle History - Volume 2	Released: 2001; Label: Rawkus Records; Formats: CD, LP (Promo)	—	—	—	—
Big L: The Archives 1996–2000	Released: June 28, 2006; Label: Corleone 531 / Flamboyant Entertainment; Format: CD	—	—	—	—
Return of the Devil's Son	Released: November 23, 2010; Label: SMC Recordings; Formats: CD, LP, digital download	—	73	—	—
The Concealed Tape	Released: February 18, 2017; Label: Takara Digital Records; Format: Digital download	—	—	—	—
Straight From The Crate Cave - Big L Edition	Released: January 21, 2022; Label: Heavy Links Recordings; Format: Cassette, digital download	—	—	—	—

=== Collaborative albums ===
List of collaborative albums, with selected chart positions
Title	Artist(s)	Album details	Peak chart positions			
Title	Artist(s)	Album details	US	US R&B	US Rap	UK
Children of the Corn: Collector’s Edition	Children of the Corn, Big L	Released: 2003; Label: Six Figga Entertainment; Format: CD, digital download	—	—	—	—
In Memory Of... Vol. 2	J-Love, Big L	Released: 2004; Not on label; Format: CD	—	—	—	—
Night Of The Living Dead Part III	Big L, Big Pun	Released: 2010; Label: Shadyville; Format: CD	—	—	—	—

=== Live albums ===
List of live albums, with selected chart positions
Title	Album details	Peak chart positions			
Title	Album details	US	US R&B	US Rap	UK
Live from Amsterdam	Released: 2003; Label: Corleone 531 / Flamboyant Entertainment; Format: CD	—	—	—	—

== Extended plays ==
List of extended plays, with selected chart positions
Title	Album details	Peak chart positions			
Title	Album details	US	US R&B	US Rap	UK
Rare Tracks (EP)	Released: 2008; Label: Spot Records / Flamboyant Entertainment; Format: LP	—	—	—	—
Devil's Son EP (From the Vaults)	Released: April 22, 2017; Label: Columbia Records; Format: LP, digital download	—	—	—	—

== Singles ==
List of singles, with selected chart positions
Title	Year	Peak chart positions			Album
Title	Year	US R&B	US Rap	US Dance	Album
"Put It On"	1995	81	23	12	Lifestylez ov da Poor & Dangerous
"M.V.P."	1995	56	15	25	Lifestylez ov da Poor & Dangerous
"Street Struck"	1995	`	`	`	Lifestylez ov da Poor & Dangerous
"Ebonics"	1998	—	—	—	The Big Picture
"We Got This" (featuring Mr. Cheeks)	1999	—	—	—	Non-album single
"Flamboyant"	2000	39	1	—	The Big Picture
"Deadly Combination"	2002	—	—	—	The Big Picture
"—" denotes releases that did not chart.

== Promotional singles ==
List of promotional singles
Title	Year	Album
"Devil's Son"	1993	Non-album single
"Clinic (Shoulda Worn A Rubba)"	1994	Non-album single
"Platinum Plus" (featuring Big Daddy Kane)	2000	The Big Picture
"Holdin' it Down" (featuring Stan Spit, A.G. & Miss Jones)	2000	The Big Picture

== Guest appearances ==
List of non-single guest appearances, with other performing artists, showing year released and album name
Title	Year	Artist(s)	Album
"Yes You May" (Funk Flow Mix)	1992	Lord Finesse	Party Over Here 12"
"Represent"	1992	Showbiz & A.G., Lord Finesse, DeShawn	Runaway Slave
"7 Minute Freestyle"	1995	Jay-Z, Stretch and Bobbito	—N/a
"Day One"	1997	D.I.T.C.	12" / D.I.T.C.
"Alone" (Funkyman Mix)	1997	Stephen Simmonds, Marquee	Alone
"Harlem NYC (Beats 2 Blow Remix)"	1997	Bootise, McGruff	12"
"Work Is Never Done"	1997	N.O.T.S. Click	12"
"Dangerous"	1997	O.C.	Jewelz
"American Dream"	1997	Children of the Corn	Rap A Cité (Paris - New York - Marseille)
"Five Fingers of Death"	1997	Diamond D, A.G., Fat Joe, Lord Finesse	Hatred, Passions and Infidelity
"Internationally Known"	1997	D.I.T.C.	12" Promo
"Da Enemy"	1997	D.I.T.C.	12" Promo
"Dignified Soldiers"	1998	Showbiz & A.G., O.C., Lord Finesse	Full Scale
"Uptown Connection"	1998	Ma$e, Herb McGruff	Destined to Be
"Back Up Off Me"	1999	N.O.T.S. Click	N.O.T.S.
"Furious Anger"	1999	Shyheim	Manchild
"Thick"	1999	D.I.T.C.	D.I.T.C.
"Get Yours"	1999	D.I.T.C.	Black Mask (soundtrack) / D.I.T.C.
"Way of Life"	2000	D.I.T.C.	D.I.T.C.
"Stand Strong"	2000	D.I.T.C.	D.I.T.C.
"Still Here"	2000	C-Town	Lyricist Lounge 2
"All Love"	2000	D.I.T.C.	The Official Version
"Bring 'Em Back"	2004	Terror Squad	True Story
"Raw and Ready"	2004	Party Artie	12" Promo

== Music videos ==
List of music videos, showing year released and director
Title	Year	Director(s)
Put It On	1994	Brian "Black" Luvar
M.V.P.	1995	Brian "Black" Luvar
No Endz, No Skinz	1995	Richard Lewis
Game Plan (Lord Finesse video cameo)	1996	
Holdin' It Down	1999	
