= List of songs recorded by Big L =

The following is a list of songs recorded by American rapper Big L.

Song Title	Year	Album	Length	Notes	
"All Black"	1995	Lifestylez ov da Poor & Dangerous	4:21	—N/a	Lord Finesse
"Audition"	2010	Return of the Devil's Son	4:48	—N/a	
"The Big Picture (Intro)"	2000	The Big Picture	2:59	—N/a	DJ Premier
"Bring 'Em Back"	2004	True Story	4:26	Fat Joe, Big Pun	Bo, Lord Finesse
"Casualties of a Dice Game"	2000	The Big Picture	3:18	—N/a	Ron Browz
"Cluemanati"	2011	The Danger Zone	4:59	Herb McGruff	
"Danger Zone"	1995	Lifestylez ov da Poor & Dangerous	3:38	Herb McGruff	Buckwild
"Dangerous"	1997	Jewelz	4:14	O.C.	Da Beatminerz
"Deadly Combination"	2000	The Big Picture	2:32	Tupac Shakur	Ron G
"Devil's Son"	2010	Return of the Devil's Son	4:00	—N/a	Showbiz
"Doo Wop #5"	2010	Return of the Devil's Son	1:31	—N/a	
"Ebonics"	2000	The Big Picture	3:21	—N/a	Ron Browz
"Ebonics" (Remix)	2010	139 & Lenox	3:12	T-Rex	
"The Enemy"	2000	The Big Picture	2:48	Fat Joe	DJ Premier
"Fall Back"	2000	The Big Picture	2:49	Kool G Rap	Shomari
"Fed Up wit the Bullshit"	1995	Lifestylez ov da Poor & Dangerous	3:53	—N/a	Lord Finesse
"Flamboyant"	2000	The Big Picture	3:07	—N/a	Mike Heron
"Furious Anger"	2010	139 & Lenox	3:42	Shyheim	
"Games"	2000	The Big Picture	4:32	Guru, Sadat X	Ysae
"Games Females Play"	2010	139 & Lenox	3:43	—N/a	
"Da Graveyard"	1995	Lifestylez ov da Poor & Dangerous	5:24	Lord Finesse, Microphone Nut, Jay-Z, Party Arty, Grand Daddy I.U.	Buckwild
"Hard to Kill"	2010	Return of the Devil's Son	2:11	—N/a	
"Harlem N.Y.C." (Beats 2 Blow Remix)	2011	The Danger Zone	4:46	Bootsie, Herb McGruff	
"Harlem World Universal"	2010	Return of the Devil's Son	1:22	—N/a	
"The Heist"	2000	The Big Picture	3:02	—N/a	Ron Browz
"The Heist Revisited"	2000	The Big Picture	3:01	—N/a	Lord Finesse
"Holdin' It Down"	2000	The Big Picture	4:39	A.G., Stan Spit, Miss Jones	Pete Rock
"I Don't Understand It"	1995	Lifestylez ov da Poor & Dangerous	4:21	—N/a	Showbiz
"I Should Have Used a Rubber"	2010	Return of the Devil's Son	4:46	—N/a	Buckwild
"I Won't"	2010	Return of the Devil's Son	4:01	—N/a	
"If You Not Aware"	2010	Return of the Devil's Son	3:44	—N/a	
"Let 'Em Have It "L""	1995	Lifestylez ov da Poor & Dangerous	3:58	—N/a	Craig Boogie
"Let Me Find Out"	2011	The Danger Zone	2:34	—N/a	
"Lifestylez ov da Poor & Dangerous"	1995	Lifestylez ov da Poor & Dangerous	3:22	—N/a	Lord Finesse
"M.V.P."	1995	Lifestylez ov da Poor & Dangerous	3:40	—N/a	Lord Finesse
"MC's What Going On"	2010	Return of the Devil's Son	3:46	—N/a	Showbiz
"Nigga Please"	2010	139 & Lenox	3:47	Stan Spit, Herb McGruff	
"No Endz, No Skinz"	1995	Lifestylez ov da Poor & Dangerous	4:59	—N/a	Showbiz
"Now or Never"	2010	139 & Lenox	3:59	—N/a	
"On the Mic" (Roc Raida Turntablist Mix)	2010	139 & Lenox	3:25	—N/a	Roc Raida
"Once Again"	2010	Return of the Devil's Son	3:31	—N/a	J-Love
"Platinum Plus"	2000	The Big Picture	3:37	Big Daddy Kane	DJ Premier
"Platinum Plus" (Original Riverside Mix)	2010	139 & Lenox	4:07	—N/a	
"Power Moves"	2010	Return of the Devil's Son	4:01	—N/a	
"Principal of the New School"	2010	Return of the Devil's Son	3:54	—N/a	Showbiz
"Put It On"	1995	Lifestylez ov da Poor & Dangerous	3:39	Kid Capri	Buckwild
"Raw & Ready"	2011	The Danger Zone	2:09	Party Arty	
"Represent"	1992	Runaway Slave	5:53	DeShawn, Lord Finesse, A.G.	Showbiz
"Return of the Devil's Son"	2010	Return of the Devil's Son	1:47	—N/a	Showbiz
"Right to the Top"	2010	Return of the Devil's Son	3:27	Royal Flush, Kool G Rap	Domingo
"S.K.I.T.S." (Remix)	2011	The Danger Zone	4:05	D.I.T.C.	
"Sandman 118"	2010	Return of the Devil's Son	2:55	—N/a	
"School Days"	2010	Return of the Devil's Son	3:15	—N/a	Showbiz
"Size 'Em Up"	2000	The Big Picture	3:55	—N/a	Ron Browz
"Slaying the Mic"	2010	Return of the Devil's Son	1:53	—N/a	
"Still Here"	2010	139 & Lenox	4:00	C-Town	Hi-Tek
"Street Struck"	1995	Lifestylez ov da Poor & Dangerous	4:10	—N/a	Lord Finesse
"Thick" (Remix)	2011	The Danger Zone	3:37	—N/a	
"Tony's Touch"	2010	Return of the Devil's Son	1:39	—N/a	DJ Premier
"The Triboro"	2000	The Big Picture	5:29	Fat Joe, O.C., Remy Ma	Showbiz
"Tru Master"	2011	The Danger Zone	4:40	—N/a	
"Unexpected Flava"	2010	Return of the Devil's Son	3:36	—N/a	Large Professor, Lord Finesse
"Universal Freestyle"	2010	139 & Lenox	1:20	—N/a	
"We All Can't Ball"	2011	The Danger Zone	3:55	Liz Lucci, Richie Thums	
"We Got This"	2010	139 & Lenox	3:30	—N/a	
"Who You Slidin' Wit"	2000	The Big Picture	4:13	Stan Spit	Pete Rock
"Who You Slidin' Wit" (Buckwild Remix)	2010	139 & Lenox	4:16	—N/a	Buckwild
"Work, Part II"	2011	The Danger Zone	3:05	Gang Starr	
"Yes You Can"	2010	Return of the Devil's Son	3:55	—N/a	
"Yes You May" (Funk Flow Mix)	1992	Party Over Here (Single)	4:09	Lord Finesse	Lord Finesse
"You Know What I'm About"	2011	The Danger Zone	4:26	Lord Finesse	
"Yours"	2011	The Danger Zone	4:10	O.C.	
"Zone of Danger"	2010	Return of the Devil's Son	3:38	—N/a	J-Love
"5 Fingers of Death"	2011	The Danger Zone	4:53	Lord Finesse, A.G., Fat Joe, Diamond D	
"8 Iz Enuff"	1995	Lifestylez ov da Poor & Dangerous	4:59	Buddah Bless, Herb McGruff, Killa Cam, Mike Boogie, Terra, Big Twan, Trooper J	Buckwild
"8 Iz Enuff" (Demo)	2011	The Danger Zone	4:20	—N/a	
"'98 Freestyle"	2000	The Big Picture	2:09	—N/a	Lord Finesse
"'98 Halftime Radio"	2011	The Danger Zone	3:39	—N/a	
