= Miss Jones (radio personality) =

American singer

- Born: Tarsha Jones; Queens, New York, U.S.
- Genre: R&B
- Years active: 1994–present
- Labels: Tommy Boy, Motown, PolyGram

Tarsha Jones, better known as Miss Jones, is an American R&B singer and radio personality. She previously worked for WQHT in New York City and 103.9 The Beat and WUSL in Philadelphia. Miss Jones was the first black woman to host Morning Radio on a hip hop radio format. She currently hosts the morning show for classic hip-hop "94.7 The Block" WXBK serving the New York City area.

== Career ==
=== Radio ===
Jones played a role in the Star and Buc Wild morning show on Hot 97. She wrote a best-selling autobiography, Have You Met Miss Jones?: The Life and Loves of Radio's Most Controversial Diva, in 2007, published by Random House.

In August 2022, Jones began hosting mornings at classic hip-hop "94.7 The Block" WXBK in Newark, New Jersey, owned and operated by American broadcasting company Audacy.

== Controversy ==
In 2005, Jones faced a two-week suspension due to contentious remarks she made on the air. The source of the controversy was a parody song called "Tsunami Song," penned by Rick Delgado, which targeted Asians following the 2004 Indian Ocean earthquake and tsunami. The fallout resulted in the dismissal of Delgado from the radio station, as well as Todd Lynn, who had made "offensive racial comments" during the broadcast. Jones herself was suspended following her impassioned on-air reaction to Miss Info, a Korean-American, who expressed her disapproval of the song.

== Bibliography ==
- Jones, Tarsha. Have You Met Miss Jones?: The Life and Loves of Radio's Most Controversial Diva. New York: Random House: 2007. ISBN 0-345-49748-1.

== Discography ==
=== Albums ===
Year	Title	Chart positions	
Year	Title	U.S. R&B	U.S. Heat
1998	The Other Woman: Released: June 16, 1998; Label: Motown	51	40

=== Singles ===
Year	Title	Peak chart positions		Album
Year	Title	U.S.	U.S. R&B	Album
1994	"Where I Wanna Be Boy"	79	21	Non-album single
1994	"Don't Front"	—	73	Non-album single
1998	"2 Way Street"	62	27	The Other Woman
2023	"Calling All Ladies"	—	—	TBA

==== As featured artist ====
Year	Title	Peak chart positions		Album
Year	Title	U.S.	U.S. R&B	Album
1992	Common Sense – "Puppy Chow" ft. Miss Jones	-	-	Can I Borrow a Dollar?
1995	Big L – "M.V.P." ft. Miss Jones	-	56	Lifestylez ov da Poor and Dangerous
1995	AZ – "Sugar Hill" ft. Miss Jones	25	12	Doe or Die
1998	Big Pun – "Punish Me" ft. Miss Jones	-	56	Capital Punishment
2000	Big L – "Holdin' it down" ft. A.G., Miss Jones & Stan Spit	-	-	The Big Picture
