= Harlem's Finest: Return of the King =

Studio album by Big L
- Released: October 31, 2025
- Recorded: 1992–99 (Big L's vocals); 1995 (Jay-Z's vocals); 2010 (Mac Miller's vocals); 2025 (production, guest vocals & mixing)
- Genres: East Coast hip-hop; hardcore hip-hop
- Length: 39:52
- Label: Mass Appeal
- Producers: Royce da 5'9" (exec.); G Koop; 2One2; Al Hug; Mike Heron; Conductor Williams; Crumley; Napes; DJ Critical Hype; Beni Moun; Ties; MTK; Lord Finesse; Dylan Graham; Malay; Pale Jay; EZ Elpee; Reggie Gordon; Frankie P; Chakra; Craig Balmoris; Tyler Reese Mehlenbacher; Sergiu Gherman; Christopher White; Seige Monstracity; Bekon; Chris Keys; Showbiz; Coleman; Beat Butcha; Biako; Ron Browz

Big L chronology
| The Danger Zone (2011) | Harlem's Finest: Return of the King (2025) |

Legend Has It... chronology
| Infinite (2025) | Harlem's Finest: Return of the King (2025) | Cabin in the Sky (2025) |

Singles from Harlem's Finest: Return of the King
- 1. "U Aint Gotta Chance" Released: October 17, 2025

Professional ratings
Review scores
| Source | Rating |
|---|---|
| Pitchfork | 5.9/10 |
| RapReviews | 7.5/10 (Note: An overall score based on a 7/10 rating for the music and an 8/10 rating for the lyrics.) |

Harlem's Finest: Return of the King is the fifth and final studio album and fourth posthumous album by American hip-hop artist Big L, released on October 31, 2025. It was officially put together by Mass Appeal as the fifth album from the Legend Has It... series, consisting of unreleased remastered tracks and rare freestyles.

== Background ==
On April 16, 2025, Mass Appeal announced a series titled Legend Has It..., which featured seven albums released in 2025 from various artists such as Nas and DJ Premier, Ghostface Killah, Raekwon, Mobb Deep, De La Soul, Pale Jay, Mac Miller and Slick Rick.

The album's lead single, "U Aint Gotta Chance" featuring American rapper Nas, was released on October 16, 2025.

The album was released on October 31, 2025.

== Track listing ==
| No. | Title | Writer(s) | Producer(s) | Length |
|---|---|---|---|---|
| 1. | "Harlem Universal" (featuring Herb McGruff) | Lamont Coleman; Herb McGruff; Robert Mandell; Ian Crumley | Crumley; G Koop | 2:33 |
| 2. | "U Ain't Gotta Chance" (featuring Nas) | Coleman; Nasir Jones; Mandell; Jesse Gumer; Alessandro Hug; Michael Herard; Zach Niess | G Koop; 2One2; Al Hug; Mike Heron | 2:48 |
| 3. | "RHN (Real Harlem Niggas)" (featuring Errol Holden) | Coleman; Errol Holden; Mandell; Napes; Beni Moun; Herard | G Koop; Napes; DJ Critical Hype; Beni Moun; Heron | 2:51 |
| 4. | "Fred Samuel Playground" (featuring Method Man) | Coleman; Clifford Smith Jr.; Denzel Williams; Napes; Ties | Conductor Williams; Napes; Ties | 1:35 |
| 5. | "Big Lee & Reg" (featuring Errol Holden) | Coleman; Holden; Herald; Matthew Crabtree | DJ Critical Hype; Heron; MTK | 1:29 |
| 6. | "All Alone (Quiet Storm Mix)" (featuring Novel) | Coleman; Alonzo Mario Stevenson; Robert A. Hall Jr.; Dylan Graham | Lord Finesse; Dylan Graham | 1:22 |
| 7. | "Forever" (featuring Mac Miller & Pale Jay) | Coleman; Malcolm James McCormick; Pale Jay; James Ryan Ho; Herald; Hug | Malay; Heron; Pale Jay; Al Hug | 2:35 |
| 8. | "7 Minute Freestyle" (featuring Jay-Z) | Coleman; Shawn Corey Carter; Lamont Juarez Porter; Reggie Gordon | EZ Elpee; Reggie Gordon | 7:24 |
| 9. | "Doo Wop Freestyle '99" (featuring Joe Budden) | Coleman; Joseph Anthony Budden II; Mandell; Frank Parra | G Koop; Frankie P | 1:26 |
| 10. | "Stretch & Bob Freestyle ('98) Intro" (featuring Donald Phinazee & Sacha Jenkins) | Coleman; Donald Phinazee; Sacha Sebastian Jenkins; Luca Ferraresi; Craig Balmoris; Tyler Reese Mehlenbacher; Sergiu Gherman; Christopher White; Seige Monstracity | Chakra; Craig Balmoris; Tyler Reese Mehlenbacher; Sergiu Gherman; Christopher White; Seige Monstracity | 0:52 |
| 11. | "Stretch & Bobbito Freestyle ('98)" | Coleman; Luca Ferraresi; Balmoris; Daniel "Danny" Tannenbaum; Mehlenbacher; Gherman; White; Monstracity | Chakra; Balmoris; Bekon; Mehlenbacher; Gherman; White; Monstracity | 1:57 |
| 12. | "Grant's Tom '97 (JazzMobile)" (featuring Joey Badass, BVNGS & DJ Ron G) | Coleman; Jo-Vaughn Virginie Scott; BVNGS; Ronald R. Bowser; Chris Keys; Napes | Chris Keys; Napes | 2:52 |
| 13. | "Live @ Rock N Will '92" (featuring Showbiz) | Coleman; Rodney Lemay; Mandell | Showbiz; G Koop; DJ Critical Hype | 3:22 |
| 14. | "How Will I Make It (Park West High School Mix)" | Coleman | Coleman | 3:58 |
| 15. | "Don and Sacha @ Inwood Hill Park (Closing Scene)" | Coleman; Eliot Dubock; Itai Shapira | Beat Butcha; Biako | 0:36 |
| 16. | "Put the Mic Down" (featuring Fergie Baby & Party Arty) (Bonus) | Coleman; Vincent Ferguson; Arthur Sheridan; Rondell Turner; Mandell | Ron Browz; G Koop | 2:05 |
| Total length: | | | | 39:52 |

== Charts ==
Chart performance for Harlem's Finest: Return of the King
| Chart (2025–2026) | Peak position |
|---|---|
| Australian Hip Hop/R&B Albums (ARIA) | 36 |
| Japanese Dance & Soul Albums (Oricon) | 12 |
| UK Album Downloads (Official Charts) | 21 |
| UK Independent Albums Breakers (OCC) | 5 |
| UK R&B Albums (Official Charts) | 22 |
