= The Tape (album) =

Studio album by Kid Capri
- Released: February 19, 1991
- Recorded: 1990
- Studio: Power Play (Long Island City, New York)
- Genre: Hip hop
- Length: 1:00:05
- Label: Cold Chillin’; Warner Bros. 26474
- Producer: Biz Markie (also exec.); Cool V

Kid Capri chronology
The Tape (1991)	Soundtrack to the Streets (1998)

Singles from The Tape
- 1. "Apollo" Released: 1991; 2. "Joke's on You, Jack" Released: 1991

The Tape is the debut studio album by American rapper Kid Capri. It was released on February 19, 1991, by Cold Chillin’/Warner Bros. Records. The recording sessions took place at Power Play Studios in Long Island City. The album was produced by Biz Markie and Cool V. It peaked at No. 87 on the Top R&B/Hip-Hop Albums in the United States. The album spawned two singles: "Apollo" and "Joke's on You, Jack".

== Critical reception ==
Professional ratings
Review scores
Source	Rating
AllMusic	4/5 stars
RapReviews	6.5/10

The Washington Post wrote that Capri "uses his hearty voice, strong emotions and thick Bronx accent to carry listeners through 14 stories".

== Track listing ==
All lyrics are written by David Anthony Love, Jr.; all music is composed by Biz Markie with co-production by Cool V.

No.	Title	Length
1.	"News Story"	3:22
2.	"Billy"	4:22
3.	"This Is What You Came For" (featuring TJ Swan)	5:00
4.	"Get 'Em" (featuring Biz Markie)	3:53
5.	"Apollo"	4:06
6.	"Hang 'Em High"	4:23
7.	"Lord's Party" (featuring Biz Markie)	4:58
8.	"You Know My Style" (featuring Biz Markie)	3:50
9.	"Whisper"	4:59
10.	"Joke's on You Jack"	4:21
11.	"Pay Attention"	3:55
12.	"Don't Sweat Me"	4:42
13.	"Step Off"	4:41
14.	"Shout Outs"	3:33
Total length:		1:00:05

== Personnel ==
- David Anthony Love, Jr. – main artist
- Dee Joseph Garner – featured artist (track 6), album coordinator
- TJ Swan – vocals (track 3)
- Anton Pukshansky – bass (track 1)
- Ivan 'Doc' Rodriguez – keyboards (track 3), engineering
- Marcel Theo Hall – producer, executive producer
- Vaughan Lee – arranger, co-producer
- JoDee Stringham – art direction, design
- Mark Seliger – photography

== Charts ==
Chart (1991)	Peak position
US Top R&B/Hip-Hop Albums (Billboard)	87
