= Unify (song) =

1998 song by Kid Capri, Snoop Dogg and Slick Rick

Single by Kid Capri featuring Snoop Dogg and Slick Rick

from the album Soundtrack to the Streets and The Art of Storytelling
- Released: 1998
- Recorded: 1998
- Studio: Larrabee Studio (Los Angeles, CA); Bearsville Studio (Bearsville, NY); The Hit Factory (New York, NY)
- Genre: Hip hop
- Length: 18:06
- Label: Track Masters; Columbia Records
- Songwriters: David Anthony Love, Jr.; Calvin Cordozar Broadus Jr.; Richard Martin Lloyd Walters; Rudolph Toombs
- Producer: Kid Capri

Snoop Dogg singles chronology
"Woof" (1998)	"Unify" (1998)	"G Bedtime Stories" (1999)

Slick Rick singles chronology
"Just Another Case" (1997)	"Unify" (1998)	"Da Art of Storytellin' (Pt. 1)" (1999)

"Unify" is the song written and performed by American hip hop recording artists Kid Capri, Snoop Dogg and Slick Rick. It was recorded at Larrabee Studio in Los Angeles, at Bearsville Studio in Bearsville and at The Hit Factory in New York City, and released in 1998 through Track Masters/Columbia Records as the only single from Kid Capri's sophomore studio album Soundtrack to the Streets. It was produced by Kid Capri himself, and contains a sample from "One Mint Julep" written by Rudy Toombs. Its remix version was produced by Poke & Tone, and contains portions of "Good Times" written by Bernard Edwards and Nile Rodgers.

The song peaked at #13 on the Bubbling Under Hot 100, at #24 on the Hot Rap Songs, at #57 on the Hot R&B/Hip-Hop Singles Sales, at #62 on the Hot R&B/Hip-Hop Songs of the Billboard charts in the United States. It was also included in Slick Rick's 1999 album The Art of Storytelling.

== Track listing ==
No.	Title	Writer(s)	Producer(s)	Length
1.	"Unify" (Album Version)	R. Walters; C. Broadus; R. Toombs	Kid Capri	4:10
2.	"Unify" (Clean Version)	R. Walters; C. Broadus; R. Toombs	Kid Capri	4:10
3.	"Unify" (Instrumental)	R. Walters; C. Broadus; R. Toombs	Kid Capri	4:10
4.	"We're Unified" (Track Masters Remix)	R. Walters; C. Broadus; R. Jackson	Poke & Tone	4:38
5.	"We're Unified" (Clean Version)	R. Walters; C. Broadus; R. Jackson	Poke & Tone	4:38
6.	"We're Unified" (Instrumental)	R. Walters; C. Broadus; R. Jackson	Poke & Tone	4:38
7.	"We're Unified" (A Cappella)	R. Walters; C. Broadus; R. Jackson	Poke & Tone	4:20

== Personnel ==
- David Anthony Love Jr. – vocals, producer (tracks: 1–3)
- Richard Martin Lloyd Walters – vocals
- Calvin Cordozar Broadus Jr. – vocals
- Jean-Claude Olivier – producer (tracks: 4–7)
- Samuel Barnes – producer (tracks: 4–7)
- D'Anthony – engineering (tracks: 1–3)
- Ben Garrison – engineering (tracks: 4–7)
- Kevin Crouse – mixing
- Tom Coyne – mastering

== Charts ==
Chart (1998)	Peak position
US Bubbling Under Hot 100 (Billboard)	13
US Hot R&B/Hip-Hop Singles Sales (Billboard)	57
US Hot R&B/Hip-Hop Songs (Billboard)	62
US Hot Rap Songs (Billboard)	24
