= Return of the Devil's Son =

Compilation album by Big L
- Released: November 23, 2010
- Recorded: 1992–1999
- Genre: Hip-hop; East Coast hip-hop; hardcore hip-hop; underground hip-hop; horrorcore
- Length: 1:07:40
- Label: SMC
- Producer: Showbiz; Large Professor; Lord Finesse; J-Love; Domingo; Buckwild

Big L chronology
139 & Lenox (2010)	Return of the Devil's Son (2010)	The Danger Zone (2011)

Professional ratings
Review scores
Source	Rating
Spin	8/10 stars

Return of the Devil's Son, is the fourth compilation album by American rapper Big L. It was released on November 23, 2010, through SMC Recordings. Officially put together by L's brother Donald Phinazee, Return of the Devil's Son is a collection of previously unreleased material, including early demo tracks, outtakes from Lifestylez ov da Poor & Dangerous and The Big Picture together with a few freestyles and new remixes. It features guest appearances from Royal Flush and Kool G Rap, as well as production by Showbiz, Lord Finesse, DJ Premier, Large Professor, Domingo, amongst others.

== Track listing ==
No.	Title	Producer(s)	Length
1.	"Return of the Devil's Son (freestyle)"	Showbiz	1:47
2.	"Devil's Son"	Showbiz	4:00
3.	"Zone of Danger"	J-Love	3:38
4.	"Sandman 118"		2:55
5.	"School Days"	Showbiz	3:15
6.	"Principal of the New School"	Showbiz	3:54
7.	"Unexpected Flava"	Large Professor; Lord Finesse	3:36
8.	"Tony’s Touch"	DJ Premier	1:39
9.	"Right to the Top" (featuring Royal Flush & Kool G Rap)	Domingo	3:27
10.	"Once Again"	J-Love	3:31
11.	"Harlem World Universal"		1:22
12.	"I Won't"		4:01
13.	"Hard to Kill"		2:11
14.	"Power Moves"		4:01
15.	"If You Not Aware"		3:44
16.	"I Should Have Used"	Buckwild	4:46
17.	"Doo Wop #5"		1:31
18.	"Yes You Can"		3:55
19.	"Audition"		4:48
20.	"MC's What Going On"	Showbiz	3:46
21.	"Slaying the Mic"		1:53
Total length:			1:07:40

== Charts ==
Chart (2010)	Peak position
US Top R&B/Hip-Hop Albums (Billboard)	73
