= Destined to Be =

Studio album by McGruff
- Released: June 16, 1998
- Recorded: 1997–1998
- Genre: Hip hop
- Length: 59:30
- Labels: Uptown; Universal
- Producers: Lewis Tucker (exec.); Heavy D (also exec.); Damian "Deo" Blyden (also exec.); Ty Fyffe; Warryn Campbell; Tony Dofat; Spunk Bigga; Daven "Prestige" Vanderpool; DT; Med; Quell; Mike "Punch" Harper

Singles from Destined to Be
- 1. "Before We Start" Released: 1998; 2. "This Is How We Do" Released: 1998

Professional ratings
Review scores
Source	Rating
AllMusic	3/5 stars
The Source	2.5/5 stars
XXL	XL (4/5)

Destined to Be is the only studio album by American rapper McGruff. It was released on June 16, 1998, by Uptown Records and Universal Records. Recording sessions took place at The Hit Factory, Greene St. Recording, Battery Studios and Sony Music Studios in New York City, and at Larrabee West in Los Angeles. Production was mostly handled by Heavy D and Ty Fyffe along with Daven "Prestige" Vanderpool and Warryn Campbell among others. It features guest appearances from Big L, Mase, Mr. Cheeks, Cam'ron, I-Born, Panama P.I., and The Lox.

The album failed to sell many copies and peaked at only 169 on the Billboard 200, though it did find better success on the R&B and Heatseekers charts. Destined to Be spawned one charting single, "Before We Start" which was a minor hit on the R&B and rap singles charts in the US.

== Track listing ==
1. "Gruff Express"- 3:37
2. "Harlem Kidz Get Biz"- 3:02
3. "This Is How We Do"- 2:54 (featuring Mr. Cheeks)
4. "Many Know"- 3:29
5. "Exquisite/The Spot"- 5:11
6. "What Part of the Game"- 4:53 (featuring Cam'ron, I-Born and Panama P.I.)
7. "Who Holds His Own"- 2:51
8. "What'cha Doin' to Me"- 3:57
9. "Destined to Be"- 4:02
10. "Freestyle"- 1:05
11. "Danger Zone"- 4:23 (featuring Big L and Mase)
12. "What You Want"- 4:36
13. "Before We Start"- 3:28
14. "Reppin' Uptown/The Signing"- 3:46 (featuring The Lox)
15. "Stop It"- 4:32
16. "Before We Start" (Remix)- 3:44

== Charts ==
Chart (1998)	Peak position
US Billboard 200	169
US Top R&B/Hip-Hop Albums (Billboard)	19
US Heatseekers Albums (Billboard)	6
