= Kid Capri =

American DJ (born 1967)

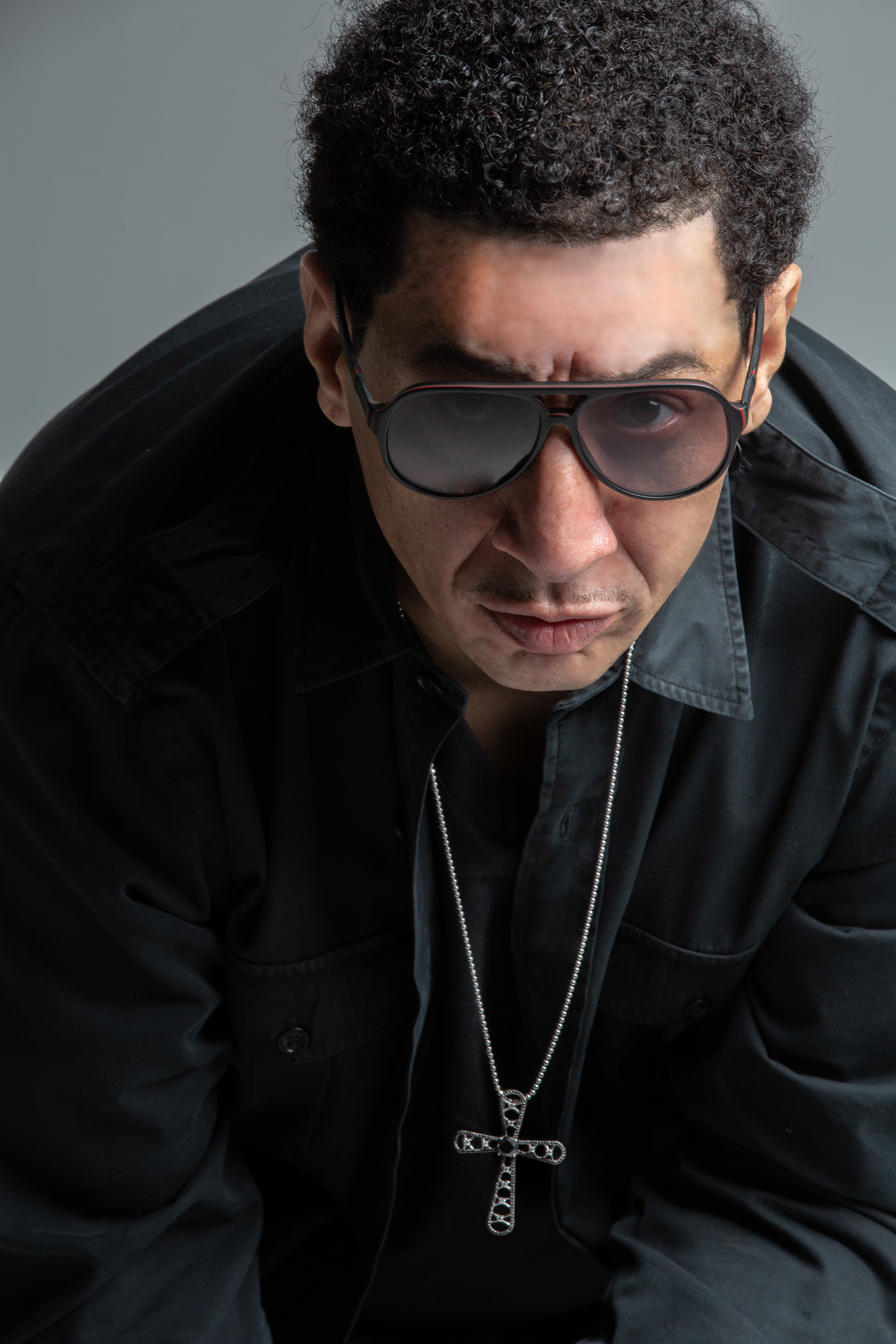
- Kid Capri in 2023

Background information
- Born: David Anthony Love Jr. February 7, 1967 (age 59); Brooklyn, New York City, U.S.
- Origin: The Bronx, New York City, U.S.
- Genre: East Coast hip-hop
- Occupations: Disc jockey; record producer; rapper
- Years active: 1987–present
- Labels: Cold Chillin'; Warner Bros.; Track Masters; Columbia; SME; eOne
- Website: kidcapri.com

David Anthony Love Jr. (born February 7, 1967), better known as Kid Capri, is an American DJ, record producer, and rapper.

== Early life ==
Kid Capri was born in New York City, in Brooklyn. He spent most of his youth in the Bronx. As an eight-year-old, Capri would attempt to scratch records on his father's Zenith stereo system.

== Career ==
Kid Capri starred in the HBO series, Russell Simmons' Def Comedy Jam. In 2017, he returned for the Netflix Def Comedy Jam’s 25th Anniversary Special. He has produced tracks for artists such as Snoop Dogg, Jay-Z, Madonna, Heavy D, and 50 Cent. He has toured with Jay-Z, Aaliyah, Salt-N-Pepa, Timbaland, and most recently RBRM. He produced a song on Jay-Z's album, Hard Knock Life. In 2017, Kid narrated Kendrick Lamar's entire Damn album. Kid premiered his vocals at Jennifer Lopez's Jennifer Lopez: All I Have Las Vegas residency, which lasted from 2016 to 2018, during the portion of her show dedicated to The Bronx.

Kid Capri deejayed for seven seasons of Def Comedy Jam. He produced tracks for Boogie Down Productions, Heavy D, Big L and Grand Puba. He eventually released an LP on Warner Brothers Records titled The Tape in 1991. He appeared in the film Who's the Man? in 1993. In 1997, Kid Capri signed with the Track Masters' Columbia Records-distributed label after he appeared on the 1997 Puff Daddy and the Family World Tour. He subsequently released Soundtrack to the Streets in 1998.

Kid Capri was involved in his own record label, No Kid'n Records. On July 29, 2007, Kid Capri made an appearance during Rock the Bells 2007 as Rakim's DJ. Kid Capri also made an appearance as Rakim's DJ during the Rock the Bells 2008 show on July 19, 2008, in Tinley Park, Illinois.

Kid was featured as lead judge on Smirnoff's Master of the Mix, the BET reality TV competition in search of the nation's best DJ. In March 2012, Kid was commissioned to remix "Masterpiece", an exclusive track featured on the special Smirnoff Nightlife Edition of Madonna's album, MDNA. Kid was also featured on Kendrick Lamar's song "ELEMENT." in which he has vocal parts in the intro and closing.

During the 2018 Global Spin Awards, which was held during NBA All-Star weekend, Kid received the Red Award in honor of DJ Red Alert from Snoop Dogg.

On May 15, 2021, Kid Capri was a Bronx Walk of Fame inductee.

In 2022, Kid released his third studio album titled The Love, marking his return after a 25-year hiatus. The Love features Capri's daughter, R&B singer Vina Love.

Kid has been featured multiple times on the We TV show Growing Up Hip Hop: New York, which debuted in 2019.

Kid collaborated with The Hoodies, brothers E-Class and Young Poppa, to produce the Hidden Gems album in 2023.

The 2003 BET Awards Tribute to Jam Master Jay honored slain Run-DMC DJ member with an all-star mix-off, which included Kid Capri as host and DJ on the decks. Twenty years later at the 2023 BET Awards, Kid Capri hosted and curated Hip-Hop's 50th Anniversary segment.

Until the fall of 2023, Kid continued to host "The Block Party" on SiriusXM FLY every weekend.

== Discography ==
=== Albums and mixtapes ===
Kid Capri's albums and mixtapes are given below.

Year	Title	Artists	Label	Type
1989	Classic 6/20/89		Tape Kingz	DJ mix: Cassette, Mixed, Mixtape
1989	Live At The Castle 11/11/1989		Kim's Videos	DJ mix: Cassette, Mixed
1990	4/11/1990		Kim's Videos	DJ mix: Cassette, Mixed
1991	The Tape		Cold Chillin', Warner Bros. Records	album
1991	Apollo / Shout Outs		Cold Chillin', Warner Bros. Records	single
1991	H.E.A.L. (Human Education Against Lies)	M.C. Lyte, Queen Latifah, KRS-One, Ms. Melodie, Run D.M.C., Jam Master Jay, Harmony (3), Kid Capri, Big Daddy Kane, L.L. Cool J., Freddie Foxxx	Elektra	single
1991	Joke's On You Jack		Cold Chillin', Warner Bros. Records	single
1991	12/3/1991		Kim's Videos	DJ mix: Cassette, Mixed
1991	Live At The Q Club 3/1/1991			DJ mix: Cassette, Mixed
1997	Black Nostaljack (Aka Come On)		Profile Records	single
1998	Soundtrack to the Streets		Track Masters, Columbia	album
1998	Follow Me / Creepin		Track Masters, Columbia	single
1998	Unify/ The Art of Storytelling	Kid Capri ft. Snoop Doggy Dogg & Slick Rick	Columbia, Track Masters	single
1998	Soundtrack To The Streets Sampler		Columbia	single
1999	52 Beats			DJ mix
2000	The Alone Re-Mix	Doo Wop & Kid Capri	Not On Label	single
2001	Party Don't Stop	Luke ft. Kid Capri & Jiggie		single
2001	Cornerstone Mixtape: Best Of 2001, vol. 35	Kid Capri, DJ Spinbad, DJ Green Lantern, DJ Revolution, various	Cornerstone Promotion	compilation
2005	Get Me@This Party	Diana King & Sarah ft. Kid Kapri	Columbia, Track Masters	single
2010	Old School Mix Tape		No Kid'n Records	CD, Mixtape
2017	No Sleep: D.J. Kid Capri - Live At The Building 1990		No Sleep	DJ mix: Cassette, Mixed, Mixtape
2022	The Love			
Unknown	The Classic Collection... Old School vol. 1			compilation
Unknown	The Classic Collection... Old School vol. 2			compilation
Unknown	The Untouchables	Kay Slay & Kid Capri	MasterTapes	Cassette, Mixed
Unknown	Got It Going On		Superdupe Recording	Cassette, Mixed, Mixtape
Unknown	Old School vol. 1		Tape Kingz	
Unknown	Old School vol. 2		Tape Kingz	
Unknown	Old School vol. 3		Tape Kingz	
Unknown	Slow Jam Mix		Kim's Videos	DJ mix: Cassette, Mixed

=== Features ===
Year	Title	Artists	Notes
1992	Back It Up	ft. Grand Puba	
1995	Put It On	ft. Big L	
1996	Da Kid Himself; Hip 2 da Game	ft. Lord Finesse	
1996	Fox Boogie	ft. Foxy Brown	
1997	Black Nostaljack (A.K.A. Come On) [Kid Capri Mix Tape Remix]	ft. Camp Lo, RUN	
1997	Intro	ft. Diamond D	
1998	Fiesta	ft. N.O.R.E.	
1998	IT;S LIKE THAT	ft. Jay-Z	
1999	Intro	ft. Kool Keith	
2000	The Club	ft. Tony Touch, D.I.T.C.	
2003	The Champions	ft. Kay Slay	
2007	We Celebrate	ft. Ghostface Killah	
2007	Get Me at This Party	ft. Sarah and Diana King	
2015		ft. Kendrick Lamar	
2019	Bend and Stretch	ft. DJ Bobby Black and DJ Mars	
2020	Spread the Love (The Re-Do)	ft. Take 6	
2023	Get It, Get It	ft. Black Rob	
2023	Come Too Far	ft. Dave East	
2024	Hoodstar	ft. Redman, Faith Evans	
2025	My DJ Spits Betta Than u	ft. Diamond D, DJs	

== Filmography ==
=== Videos ===
- "Crossover" (1992 off EPMD's Business Never Personal)
- "DWYCK" (1992 off GangStarr's Hard to Earn)
- "Put It On" (1995 off Big L's Lifestylez ov da Poor & Dangerous)
- "MVP" (1995 off Big L's Lifestylez ov da Poor & Dangerous)
- "We Celebrate" (2007 off Ghostface Killah's The Big Doe Rehab)

=== Cameos and roles in film ===
- Who's the Man? as himself (1993)
- A Get2Gether as Dee Jay (2005)
- Def Comedy Jam 25 as himself (2017)
