= Soundtrack to the Streets =

Studio album by Kid Capri
- Released: November 3, 1998
- Studio: Soundtrack (New York, NY); The Hit Factory (New York, NY); Westlake (Los Angeles, CA); Luke (Miami, FL); Right Track (New York, NY); So So Def; Avatar
- Genre: Hip hop
- Length: 1:05:05
- Label: Trackmasters; Columbia; SME
- Producer: Kid Capri (also exec.); Poke and Tone (also exec.)

Kid Capri chronology
The Tape (1991)	Soundtrack to the Streets (1998)	The Love (2022)

Singles from Soundtrack to the Streets
- 1. "Unify" Released: 1998

Professional ratings
Review scores
Source	Rating
AllMusic	3/5 stars
Entertainment Weekly	B+

Soundtrack to the Streets is the second studio album by American rapper and record producer Kid Capri. It was released on November 3, 1998, on Track Masters/Columbia/SME Records. The recording sessions took place at Soundtrack Studios, The Hit Factory and Right Track Studios in New York City, at Westlake Studio in Los Angeles, at Luke Studios in Miami, at Avatar and at So So Def Studios. The album was produced by Kid Capri and Poke and Tone. It peaked at No. 135 on the Billboard 200 and at No. 25 on the Top R&B/Hip-Hop Albums in the United States. It spawned a single "Unify" featuring Snoop Dogg and Slick Rick.

== Track listing ==
All music is composed by Kid Capri, except track 20 composed by Poke and Tone.

No.	Title	Writer(s)	Length
1.	"Intro"		1:33
2.	"Like That" (featuring Jay-Z)	D. Love Jr.; S. Carter; F. Friedman	3:44
3.	"Interlude" (featuring Snoop Dogg and Warren G)		0:11
4.	"Unify" (featuring Snoop Dogg and Slick Rick)	D. Love Jr.; C. Broadus; R. Walters; R. Toombs	4:08
5.	"The Hit Off" (featuring Busta Rhymes and Spliff Star)	D. Love Jr.; T. Smith; W. Lewis	3:49
6.	"Interlude" (featuring Angie Martinez)		0:25
7.	"Soundtrack to the Streets" (featuring Nas)	D. Love Jr.; N. Jones; H. Bernstein	3:54
8.	"Interview 1" (featuring Joe Clair and Common)		0:52
9.	"Freestyle" (featuring Da Ranjahz)	D. Love Jr.; M. Bygr; N. Leguerre; J.M. Hughes; E.G. Butler; G.C. Battle	1:53
10.	"My Niggaz" (featuring the Lox and Foxy Brown)	D. Styles; J. Phillips; J. Burke; I. Marchand; T. Riley	4:58
11.	"Interlude" (A Simple Message)		0:53
12.	"Be All Right" (featuring Cam'ron and Jermaine Dupri)	D. Love Jr.; J. Dupri; C. Giles; R. Griffin	3:56
13.	"Interlude" (Phone Sex)		0:49
14.	"When We Party" (featuring Luke)	D. Love Jr.; L. Campbell; S. Wayne; J. Cordova	4:11
15.	"Interlude" (Party Time)		0:19
16.	"Loud & Clear" (featuring Lost Boyz)	D. Love Jr.; L. Elliott; Hunter; Lewis; McDonalds	3:52
17.	"Block Party" (featuring Noreaga and Big Pun)	D. Love Jr.; C. Rios; V. Santiago	2:41
18.	"Hot This Year" (featuring Brand Nubian and Diamond D)	D. Love Jr.; W. Dixon; D. Murphy; A. Jones; L. Dechalus; J. Kirkland; A. Green; A. Jackson	3:57
19.	"Interview 2" (featuring Joe Clair and Common)		1:07
20.	"We're Unified (Track Masters Remix)" (featuring Snoop Dogg and Slick Rick)	C. Broadus; R. Walters; R. Jackson; B. Edwards; N. Rodgers	4:31
21.	"Freestyle" (featuring Camp Lo)	D. Love Jr.; S. Wallace; S. Wilds	1:13
22.	"Do or Die" (featuring KRS-One)	D. Love, Jr.; L. Parker	3:55
23.	"Interlude" (featuring Joe Torry)		0:32
24.	"Follow Me" (featuring Buckshot and Cocoa Brovaz)	D. Love Jr.; K. Blake; T. Williams; D. Yates, Jr.	3:28
25.	"One on One" (featuring Ras Kass and Punchline)	D. Love Jr.; J. Austin; R. Truell; M. Green; C. Bedford	3:56
26.	"Outro" (featuring Toshi Kubota)	D. Love Jr.; T. Kubota	0:18
Total length:			1:05:05

== Charts ==
Chart (1998)	Peak position
US Billboard 200	135
US Top R&B/Hip-Hop Albums (Billboard)	25
