= Flamboyant (Big L song) =

2000 song by Big L

Single by Big L

from the album The Big Picture
- B-side: "On the Mic"
- Released: May 30, 2000
- Studio: C Mo' Greens Studio (Queens, New York)
- Genre: Hip hop
- Length: 3:07 (album version); 3:11 (single version)
- Label: Rawkus, Flamboyant, Priority
- Songwriters: Lamont Coleman; Dee Ervin; Mike Heron; Wes Farrell
- Producer: Mike Heron

Big L singles chronology
| "Holdin' it Down" (2000) | "Flamboyant" (2000) | "Deadly Combination" (2002) |

"Flamboyant" is a song by American rapper and songwriter Big L. It appears as the tenth track on his second studio album The Big Picture, posthumously released. It was his fifth released and first posthumous single. It topped the US Rap charts, while it peaked at number 39 on the US R&B charts.

== Release ==
The single topped the US Rap charts on June 24, 2000 and stayed there for three weeks, then spending 28 weeks on the charts. It also spent fourteen weeks on the US R&B charts.

== Track listings ==
- 12" single
1. "Flamboyant" (Clean) – 3:11
2. "Flamboyant" (Dirty) – 3:11
3. "Flamboyant" (Instrumental) – 3:11
4. "Flamboyant" (Acapella) – 3:11
5. "On the Mic" (Clean) – 3:26
6. "On the Mic" (Dirty) – 3:26
7. "On the Mic" (Instrumental) – 3:26
8. "On the Mic" (Acapella) – 3:26
- CD and cassette single
1. "Flamboyant" – 3:11
2. "Flamboyant" (Instrumental) – 3:11
3. "On the Mic" – 3:26
4. "On the Mic" (Instrumental) – 3:26

== Personnel ==
- Big L - vocals, songwriter
- Dee Ervin - songwriter
- Mike Heron - songwriter, producer
- Wes Farrell - songwriter
- Max Vargas - recorder
- DJ Sebb - scratcher
- Louis Alfred III - mixer

== Charts ==
| Chart (2000) | Peak position |
|---|---|
| US Hot R&B/Hip-Hop Songs (Billboard) | 39 |
| US Hot Rap Songs (Billboard) | 1 |
