= Put It On =

- 12" vinyl cover

Single by Big L

from the album Lifestylez ov da Poor & Dangerous
- Released: November 13, 1994
- Recorded: 1994
- Genre: Hip-hop
- Length: 3:42
- Label: Columbia; Sony
- Songwriters: Lamont Coleman; David Love; Anthony Best
- Producer: Buckwild

Big L singles chronology
"Put It On" (1994)	"M.V.P." (1995)

Kid Capri singles chronology
"Joke's On You Jack" (1991)	"Put It On" (1995)	"Unify" (1998)

Audio sample
- file; help

Music video
- "Put It On" on YouTube

"Put It On" is a song by the American rapper Big L featuring American DJ Kid Capri. The song was produced by Buckwild for Big L's debut studio album, Lifestylez ov da Poor & Dangerous (1995). The song was written by Big L, Kid Capri and Buckwild. The song was released on November 13, 1994 as the first single from the album through Columbia Records and Sony Music.

In an interview with HipHopDX, Lord Finesse described "Put It On":

[Columbia Records] wanted something with a hook that would be kinda catchy, and something they could get radio play with. Like, everything [L] did was dark, and it was gangsta, and it was…what was the [popular style at the time]? Horror-core. So they needed something bright, something friendly. And "Put It On" just matched everything perfect… "Put it on", the slang…was like… "do your thing". "Put it on, Big L, put it on…" [meaning] you gotta do your thing, you gotta represent.

It was also sampled in dubstep producer Datsik's song "Firepower".

== Track listing ==
12" Vinyl
No.	Title	Length
1.	"Put It On" (Main Mix)	3:36
2.	"Put It On" (Instrumental)	3:37
3.	"Put It On" (Radio Edit)	3:38
4.	"Put It On" (A capella)	3:12

== Charts ==
Chart (1995)	Peak position
US Hot Dance Music/Maxi-Singles Sales (Billboard)	12
US Hot R&B/Hip-Hop Songs (Billboard)	81
