= The Danger Zone (album) =

Studio album by Big L
- Released: May 31, 2011
- Recorded: 1994–1999
- Genre: East Coast hip-hop; hardcore hip-hop
- Length: 69:50
- Label: RBC; eOne
- Producer: DJ Premier; Lord Finesse; DJ Phantom; Donald Phinazee

Big L chronology
Return of the Devil's Son (2010)	The Danger Zone (2011)	Harlem's Finest: Return of the King (2025)

The Danger Zone is the fourth studio album and third posthumous album by American hip-hop artist Big L, released May 31, 2011 on RBC Records. L's brother Donald Phinazee produced most of the album and other production came from DJ Phantom. The album was originally announced on April 12, 2011, and features artists such as Gang Starr, O.C., Herb McGruff, A.G., Roc Raida, Lord Finesse as well as other D.I.T.C. members. It is the second album that contains unreleased and unheard tracks and freestyles, after Return of the Devil's Son.

The album received positive reviews and Andres Vasquez calls the album a "must have".

== Track listing ==
No.	Title	Length
1.	"8 Iz Enuff" (demo version featuring Terra, Herb McGruff, Buddah Bless, Big Twan, Killa Cam, Trooper J & Mike Boogie)	4:20
2.	"Harlem N.Y.C." (Beats 2 Blow remix) (featuring Bootsie and Herb McGruff)	4:46
3.	"You Know What I'm About" (featuring Lord Finesse)	4:26
4.	"98 Halftime Radio"	3:39
5.	"Yours" (featuring O.C.)	4:10
6.	"Work, Part II" (featuring Gang Starr)	3:05
7.	"Tru Master"	4:40
8.	"Cluemanati" (featuring Herb McGruff)	4:59
9.	"5 Fingas of Death" (featuring Lord Finesse, A.G., Fat Joe, Diamond D)	4:53
10.	"Let Me Find Out"	2:34
11.	"We All Can't Ball" (featuring Liz Lucci and Richie Thums)	3:55
12.	"S.K.I.T.S." (Remix featuring D.I.T.C.)	4:05
13.	"Live in Amsterdam" (featuring A.G. and Roc Raida)	20:18
Total length:		69:50

Deluxe edition
No.	Title	Length
14.	"Raw & Ready" (featuring Party Arty)	2:09
15.	"Thick" (remix)	3:37
Total length:		75:36

== Personnel ==
Credits for The Danger Zone adapted from AllMusic.

- Dan Ambrose – art direction, design
- Gustavo "DJ Phantom" Guerra – executive producer
- Donald Phinazee – executive producer

== Release history ==
Region	Date	Label	Format	Catalog
United States	May 31, 2011	RBC Records	CD	RBCCD231
United States	May 31, 2011	RBC Records	Digital download	RBCCD231
