= 139 & Lenox =

Studio album by Big L
- Released: August 31, 2010
- Recorded: 1994–1999
- Genre: East Coast hip-hop; underground hip-hop; horrorcore
- Length: 40:48
- Label: Flamboyant
- Producer: Roc Raida; Hi-Tek; Buckwild; Ron Browz

Big L chronology
Live from Amsterdam (2003)	139 & Lenox (2010)	Return of the Devil's Son (2010)

139 & Lenox is the third studio album and second posthumous album by American hip-hop artist Big L. It was released on August 31, 2010, by Flamboyant. The title of the album refers to the street corner of Harlem where Big L was raised.

The 12-song collection of rare and unreleased tracks is a tribute to the revered DITC rapper's hallowed Harlem block, featuring production by the late Roc Raida on "On the Mic (Roc Raida Turntablist Mix)", as well as Big L's former fellow Rawkus artists Hi-Tek and Buckwild. Previously unheard early mixes to classic L tracks like "Ebonics" and "Platinum Plus" and a live version of L's controversial 1st single "Devil's Son" can be heard alongside rare classics like "Furious Anger."

== Track listing ==
No.	Title	Producer(s)	Length
1.	"Now or Never"		3:59
2.	"On the Mic" (Roc Raida Turntablist Mix)	Roc Raida	3:25
3.	"Ebonics" (Remix featuring T-Rex)	Ron Browz	3:12
4.	"We Got This"		3:30
5.	"Platinum Plus" (Original Riverside Mix)		4:07
6.	"Furious Anger" (featuring Shyheim)		3:42
7.	"Still Here" (featuring C-Town)	Hi-Tek	4:00
8.	"Games Females Play"		3:43
9.	"Nigga Please" (featuring Stan Spit and Herb McGruff)		3:47
10.	"Who You Slidin' Wit" (Buckwild Remix)	Buckwild	4:16
11.	"Universal Freestyle"		1:20
12.	"Devil's Son" (Live In Amsterdam)		1:47
Total length:			40:48

== Personnel ==
Credits for 139 & Lenox adapted from AllMusic.

- Rich King – executive producer
- Ricky Powell – photography
