= Lifestylez ov da Poor & Dangerous =

Studio album by Big L
- Released: March 28, 1995
- Recorded: 1992–94
- Studios: Powerplay (Queens, New York); Unique (New York City); Chung King (New York City)
- Genres: East Coast hip-hop; hardcore hip-hop; horrorcore
- Length: 48:51
- Label: Columbia
- Producers: Buckwild; Lord Finesse; Showbiz; Craig Boogie

Big L chronology
Lifestylez ov da Poor & Dangerous (1995)	The Big Picture (2000)

Singles from Lifestylez ov da Poor & Dangerous
- 1. "Put It On" Released: November 13, 1994; 2. "M.V.P." Released: January 1, 1995; 3. "No Endz, No Skinz" Released: March 4, 1995

Lifestylez ov da Poor & Dangerous is the debut studio album by American rapper Big L, and the only to be released during his lifetime. It was released on March 28, 1995, by Columbia Records. The recording sessions took place primarily at Powerplay Studios in Queens, New York. The album was produced by Buckwild, Lord Finesse, Showbiz, and Craig Boogie. The album title is a play on the television series, Lifestyles of the Rich and Famous.

The album debuted at number 149 on the US Billboard 200 and number 22 on R&B/Hip-Hop Albums, but did not chart internationally. Lifestylez ov da Poor & Dangerous spawned three singles: "Put It On", "M.V.P.", and "No Endz, No Skinz", the first two both peaked within the top 25 on the US Hot Rap Tracks and Hot Dance Singles Sales. Upon its release, the album received positive reviews from the hip-hop community, earning praise for Big L's lyricism and wordplay. As of August 2000, the album had sold 200,000 copies, according to Nielsen SoundScan.

== Background ==
Big L began writing rhymes in 1990 and his first professional appearance came on the B-side of "Party Over Here" by Lord Finesse in 1992. Around this time, L joined Lord Finesse's Bronx-based hip hop group Diggin' in the Crates Crew (D.I.T.C.). The group consisted of Lord Finesse, Diamond D, O.C., Fat Joe, Buckwild, Showbiz and A.G. He founded Harlem centered rap group Children of the Corn with fellow aspiring MC's Killa Cam, Murda Mase, Bloodshed and Herb McGruff; when Bloodshed died in a car accident in 1997, the group later disbanded.

In 1993, Big L submitted a four track cassette tape to Columbia Records, who soon after signed him to their company.

== Recording and production ==
Recording for Lifestylez ov da Poor & Dangerous mainly took place at Powerplay Studios (Queens, New York); the songs "Put It On" and "Danger Zone" were recorded at Unique Studios (New York City, New York) and the songs "M.V.P." and "Street Struck" were recorded at Chung King Studios (New York City, New York). James Niedermeyer worked with Big L on the album and heavily influenced the lyrics on songs such as "Danger Zone" and "All Black".

Lifestylez ov da Poor & Dangerous was produced by mainly members of Big L's group, Diggin' in the Crates Crew: Buckwild, Lord Finesse (who produced most of the album), and Showbiz. Craig Boogie as well as Kid Capri (who was often referred to as an honorary member of D.I.T.C.) also helped with the production of the album. The album also features guest appearances from a young Cam'ron (credited as Killa Cam on "8 Iz Enuff") and Jay-Z (on "Da Graveyard").

== Composition ==
In a 2010 interview with HipHopDX to commemorate the album's 15th anniversary and its re-issue by Traffic Entertainment, Lord Finesse discussed the making of the album.

Concerning "Put It On", he stated:

[Columbia Records] wanted something with a hook that would be kinda catchy, and something they could get radio play with. Like, everything [L] did was dark, and it was gangsta, and it was ... what was the [popular style at the time]? Horror-core. So they needed something bright, something friendly. And "Put It On" just matched everything perfect.

Concerning "M.V.P.", he stated:

That song came about because L wanted a commercial, R&B loop that everybody could recognize. And me remembering that [DeBarge] record, and also remembering how Kid Capri used it way back when he did – I forgot which record he did, but he had that [song], and I'm like, "Damn, well maybe we could reinvent that right there." And L heard the loop and was like, "Yeah, that's it!" But, [with] Diggin', we had to have the right drums, the right everything [to go with a sample], and we dressed it up in a way where we tried to keep it Hip Hop.

Concerning "8 Iz Enuff", he said:

With that [song] L just thought he had to do a track with the rappers from his hood. And he definitely wanted to put on [those particular emcees]… We looking like, "How you gonna put eight niggas on one track?" [And he was like], "Don't worry, I got this."

Speaking about "Danger Zone", he said:

At the time it was somebody by the name of David Kahne [working as L's A&R at Columbia]. He was like the person who was responsible for getting L signed, and he loved all that devil's son shit. [Says in nasally white-guy voice] "Oh wow, this is great!" It's like, "Are you serious?" Because we had to make [L] change a line in "Devil's Son" because it was [like], "You're too out-of-order." What was the line ... "I'm killin' chumps for the cheapest price / I'm rollin' with Satan," [and instead of then saying "not Jesus Christ"] it was "F Jesus Christ." But we made him change it to "Not Jesus Christ." [We were] like, "Yo, what the fuck are you doing?!"

Commenting on "Street Struck", he said:

That was Sony [that wanted him to make something more positive]. [They were like], "You so dark on this album, we need something positive we can push. This album is too dark: you got "All Black", you got "Danger Zone", you done came out with "Devil's Son". We really don't wanna push that as your image. You have to do something that's gonna balance it." And that's [when] we started doing more conceptual, conscious songs like "Fed Up Wit The Bullshit", "Street Struck", and "M.V.P." and "Put It On".

== Release and promotion ==
Lifestylez ov da Poor & Dangerous was released on March 28, 1995. Prior to the release, Big L, under Columbia, released a promotional cassette tape in 1994 consisting of four tracks that did not make it to the final album.

=== Singles ===
Lifestylez ov da Poor & Dangerous released three singles, all of which peaked within the top 25 on Billboard's Hot Rap Tracks and Hot Dance Singles Sales. The first single to release was "Put It On." It peaked at number 12 on Hot Dance Singles Sales, 23 on Hot Rap Tracks, and 81 on Hot R&B/Hip-Hop Songs. The second single to be released was "M.V.P.", which peaked at number 15 on Hot Rap Tracks, 25 on Hot Dance Singles Sales, and 56 on Hot R&B/Hip-Hop Songs. The third and final single from the album was "No Endz, No Skinz", however, the song did not chart. In addition to the three singles, "Street Struck" was released as a promotional single, but did not chart as well.

== Reception ==
=== Commercial performance ===
Lifestylez ov da Poor & Dangerous debuted at number 149 on the US Billboard 200 and number 22 on the US R&B/Hip-Hop Albums. The album would not peak any higher. It has sold over 200,000 copies as of August 2000.

=== Critical response ===
Professional ratings
Review scores
Source	Rating
AllMusic	3/5 stars
RapReviews	9/10
The Rolling Stone Album Guide	2/5 stars
The Source	4/5 stars

The Source wrote that "[Big L] comes with ill animated lyrics, combined with metaphors that stun; a combo sure to have suckas on the run".

M. F. DiBella of AllMusic complimented Big L as "a master of the lyrical stickup undressing his competition with kinetic metaphors and a brash comedic repertoire," while noting: "With better production and marketing, Big L might have found himself with a platinum album but instead he settled for platinum respect."

Steve Juon of RapReviews called the album "jam packed with treats" and lamented that it "faded quietly into obscurity, now better known after his death than it was while he was still alive".

== Track listing ==
No.	Title	Writer(s)	Producer(s)	Length
1.	"Put It On" (featuring Kid Capri)	Coleman; Best	Buckwild	3:39
2.	"M.V.P."	Coleman; Hall; Jordan; M.D. DeBarge	Lord Finesse	3:40
3.	"No Endz, No Skinz"	Coleman; Lemay	Showbiz	3:30
4.	"8 Iz Enuff" (featuring Terra, Herb McGruff, Buddah Bless, Big Twan, Killa Cam, Trooper J & Mike Boogie)	Best; Buddah Bless; Coleman; Kam; McGruff; Mik; Terra; Trooper J.; Twan	Buckwild	4:59
5.	"All Black"	Coleman; Hall	Lord Finesse	4:21
6.	"Danger Zone" (featuring Herb McGruff)	Best; Coleman	Buckwild	3:38
7.	"Street Struck"	Coleman; Hall	Lord Finesse	4:10
8.	"Da Graveyard" (featuring Lord Finesse, Microphone Nut, Jay-Z, Party Arty & Grand Daddy I.U.)	Coleman; Best	Buckwild	5:24
9.	"Lifestylez ov da Poor & Dangerous"	Coleman; Hall	Lord Finesse	3:22
10.	"I Don't Understand It"	Coleman; Lemay	Showbiz	4:21
11.	"Fed Up wit the Bullshit"	Coleman; Hall	Lord Finesse	3:53
12.	"Let 'Em Have It L"	C.Rollins; Coleman	Craig Boogie	3:58

== Early configurations ==
A promotional cassette circulated in 1994 with a different track listing, including four songs that did not make the final retail album. A later promotional cassette also included an extra track that was removed from the final track listing. Tracks 6, 7, 8 and 13 can be found on Devil’s Son EP (Songs From the Vault) which was released in 2017.

No.	Title	Writer(s)	Producer(s)	Length
1.	"Put It On" (featuring Kid Capri)	Best; Coleman	Buckwild	3:39
2.	"No Endz, No Skinz"	Coleman; Lemay	Showbiz	3:30
3.	"8 Iz Enuff" (featuring Terra, Herb McGruff, Buddah Bless, Big Twan, Killa Cam, Trooper J & Mike Boogie)	Best; Buddah Bless; Coleman; Kam; McGruff; Mik; Terra; Trooper J.; Twan	Buckwild	4:59
4.	"I Don't Understand It"	Coleman; Lemay	Showbiz	4:21
5.	"Lifestylez Ov Da Poor & Dangerous"	Coleman; Hall	Lord Finesse	3:22
6.	"Devil's Son"	Coleman; Lemay	Showbiz	4:03
7.	"I Shoulda Used A Rubba"	Coleman; Best	Buckwild	4:39
8.	"School Dayz"	Coleman; Hall	Lord Finesse	3:16
9.	"All Black"	Coleman; Hall	Lord Finesse	4:21
10.	"Da Graveyard" (featuring Lord Finesse, Microphone Nut, Jay-Z, Party Arty & Grand Daddy I.U.)	Best; Coleman	Buckwild	5:24
11.	"Let 'Em Have It L"	C.Rollins; Coleman	Craig Boogie	3:58
12.	"Fed Up Wit The Bullshit"	Coleman; Hall	Lord Finesse	3:53
13.	"Timez Iz Hard"	Coleman; Hall; Best	Buckwild; Lord Finesse	3:32

== Personnel ==
- Buckwild – producer
- Dino Zervous – engineer
- Big L – vocals
- Craig Boogie – producer
- Mike Boogie – vocals
- Buddah Bless – vocals
- Herb McGruff – vocals
- Showbiz – producer
- Trooper J – vocals
- Big Twan – vocals
- Grand Daddy I.U. – vocals
- Jay-Z – vocals
- Tony Dawsey – mastering
- Danny Clinch – photography
- Michelle Willems – art direction, design
- Killa Cam – vocals
- John Shriver – engineer
- Party Arty – vocals
- Terra – vocals
- Kid Capri – vocals, producer
- Chris Conway – engineer
- Lord Finesse – vocals, producer
- Microphone Nut – vocals

== Charts ==
Chart (1995)	Peak position
US Billboard 200	149
US Top R&B/Hip-Hop Albums (Billboard)	22

Chart (2026)	Peak position
German Albums (Offizielle Top 100)	36
German Hip-Hop Albums (Offizielle Top 100)	6

== Release history ==
Region	Date	Label
United States	March 28, 1995	Columbia
France	March 28, 1995	Sony
Canada	June 18, 2001	Sony
United Kingdom	October 6, 2009	Sony
