= Children of the Corn (group) =

American hip hop group

- Children of the Corn photographed in the early 1990s.

Background information
- Also known as: C.O.C.
- Origin: Manhattan, New York City, U.S.
- Genres: Hip-hop, horrorcore
- Years active: 1993–1996
- Past members: Big L (deceased); Cam'ron; Mase; McGruff; Bloodshed (deceased); Six Figga Digga

Children of the Corn was a New York hip-hop group that was founded in 1993 by Harlem emcees Big L, McGruff (AKA Herb McGruff), Mase (then Murda Mase), Cam'ron (then Killa Cam), Bloodshed (Cam's cousin; real name Derek Michael Armstead) and producer Six Figga Digga.

Known as a "Harlem super group" that "generated buzz on the streets", it disbanded after the death of Bloodshed, who was killed in a car accident on March 2, 1997, at age 21, and the death of Big L, who was gunned down on February 15, 1999, at age 24. Even before the group disbanded, each of the group members had pursued solo careers. Members Big L and Mase endured a plagiarism-related dispute while part of the group.

A retrospective compilation album, The Collector's Edition, was released in 2003.
