= M.V.P. (song) =

Single by Big L

from the album Lifestylez ov da Poor and Dangerous
- Released: 1995
- Recorded: 1994
- Genre: East Coast hip hop; gangsta rap
- Length: 3:39
- Label: Columbia
- Songwriter: Lamont Coleman
- Producer: Lord Finesse

Big L singles chronology
"Put It On" (1994)	"M.V.P." (1995)	"Street Struck" (1995)

Music video
- "M.V.P." on YouTube

"M.V.P." is a song recorded by American rapper Big L. The song was written by Big L and produced by Lord Finesse for Big L's debut studio album Lifestylez ov da Poor and Dangerous. It was released in 1995 through Columbia Records as the second single from the album along with a "Summer Smooth Mix" featuring singer/songwriter Indoe. The original version samples "Stay With Me" by DeBarge. The acronym M.V.P. usually stands for 'most valuable player' in sports and e-sports settings. In the song, however, Big L takes it to stand for "most valuable poet". 4 remixes for the song exist: the Summer Smooth mix featuring Miss Jones and produced by Giovanni Salah, two remixes produced by Buckwild, both appearing on his 2007 album Buckwild: Diggin' in the Crates, and a remix by DJ Premier.

== Charts ==
Chart (1996)	Peak position
US Hot Dance Music/Maxi-Singles Sales (Billboard)	25
US Hot R&B/Hip-Hop Songs (Billboard)	56
US Hot Rap Tracks (Billboard)	15
