= The Big Picture (Big L album) =

Studio album by Big L
- Released: August 1, 2000
- Recorded: 1998 - 1999
- Studios: D&D Studios (New York City, New York)
- Genre: Hardcore hip-hop
- Length: 55:36
- Labels: Flamboyant; Rawkus
- Producers: DJ Premier; Ron Browz; Ron G; Lord Finesse; Pete Rock; Shomari; Mike Heron; Ysae; Showbiz

Big L chronology
Lifestylez ov da Poor & Dangerous (1995)	The Big Picture (2000)	Live from Amsterdam (2003)

Singles from The Big Picture
- 1. "Ebonics" Released: October 18, 1998; 2. "Holdin' it Down" Released: March 11, 2000; 3. "Flamboyant" Released: May 30, 2000

The Big Picture is the second studio album by American rapper Big L. The album was slated for a 1999 release, but due to Big L's murder, it was posthumously released on August 1, 2000, on Rawkus Records and Big L's Flamboyant Entertainment. It was incomplete at the time of Big L's death, and was posthumously completed by his manager and partner in Flamboyant Entertainment, Rich King. Recording sessions for the album took place primarily at D&D Studios in New York City, New York throughout 1998 and early 1999. It was produced by DJ Premier (who also executive produced the album), Ron Browz, Ron G, Lord Finesse, Pete Rock, Shomari, Mike Heron, Ysae, and Showbiz. The Big Picture features appearances from Fat Joe, Remy Ma, Guru, Kool G Rap, Big Daddy Kane, 2Pac, Sadat X, and more.

== Commercial performance ==
The album sold 72,549 copies in its first week, debuting and peaking at number 13 on the Billboard 200. It was certified Gold by the Recording Industry Association of America in October 2000. To date, it is Big L's best selling album.

== Critical reception ==
Professional ratings
Review scores
Source	Rating
Allmusic	3/5 stars
RapReviews	8/10
Rolling Stone	3.5/5 stars
The Source	4/5 stars
USA Today	3/4 stars
Vibe	3.5/5 stars

The Big Picture has received critical acclaim. M.F. DiBella of Allmusic gave the album three out of five stars. RapReviews' Steve Juon gave it eight out of ten stars. Rolling Stone gave it three and a half stars out of five. It has been regarded as one of the most underrated hip-hop albums of all time.

== Content ==
The track "The Enemy", featuring fellow New York rapper Fat Joe, talks about the NYPD in a negative way, "criticizing its provoking and shady ways", according to April Park of the Riverfront Times.

== Track listing ==
Writers by Allmusic.

No.	Title	Writer(s)	Producer(s)	Length
1.	"The Big Picture" (Intro)	Lamont Coleman; Christopher Martin	DJ Premier	2:59
2.	"Ebonics (Criminal Slang)"	Coleman; Rondell Turner	Ron Browz	3:21
3.	"Size ’Em Up"	Coleman; Turner	Ron Browz	3:55
4.	"Deadly Combination" (featuring 2Pac)	Coleman; Ronald Bowser; Tupac Shakur	Ron G	2:32
5.	"'98 Freestyle"	Coleman	Lord Finesse	2:09
6.	"Holdin' It Down" (featuring A.G., Miss Jones & Stan Spit)	Andre Barnes; Coleman; Peter Phillips; Stan Draton; Tarsha Jones	Pete Rock	4:39
7.	"The Heist"	Coleman; Turner	Ron Browz	3:02
8.	"The Enemy" (featuring Fat Joe)	Coleman; Joseph Cartagena; Martin	DJ Premier	2:48
9.	"Fall Back" (featuring Kool G Rap)	Coleman; James Elite; Nathaniel Wilson; Shomari Jackson	Shomari	2:49
10.	"Flamboyant"	Bobby Ervin; Coleman; Gail Farrell; Mickael Heron	Mike Heron	3:07
11.	"Casualties of a Dice Game"	Coleman; Turner	Ron Browz	3:18
12.	"Platinum Plus" (featuring Big Daddy Kane)	Antonio Hardy; Coleman; Martin	DJ Premier	3:37
13.	"Who You Slidin' Wit" (featuring Stan Spit)	Coleman; Draton; Phillips	Pete Rock	4:13
14.	"Games" (featuring Guru & Sadat X)	Coleman; Derek Murphy; Keith Elam; Leroy Southwell	Ysae	4:32
15.	"The Heist Revisited"	Coleman; Robert Hall	Lord Finesse	3:01
16.	"The Triboro" (featuring Fat Joe, O.C. & Remy Ma)	Coleman; Cartagena; Omar Credle; Reminisce Mackie; Rodney Lemay	Showbiz	5:29

== Personnel ==
Credits for The Big Picture adapted from Allmusic.

- Louis Alfred III — mixing
- Big Daddy Kane — performer
- Big L — executive producer, performer
- Bob Brown — engineer
- Ron Browz — producer
- Rob Dinero — composer, engineer
- DJ Premier — executive producer, producer
- Fat Joe — performer
- 2Pac — performer, writer
- Mike Heron — executive producer, producer
- Kool G Rap — performer
- Lord Finesse — executive producer, mixing, producer
- Eric Lynch — engineer
- Miss Jones — performer
- Pete Rock — producer
- Sadat X — performer
- Shomari — producer
- Duncan Stanbury — mastering
- Max Vargas — engineer
- Carlisle Young — mixing
- YSAE — producer

== Charts ==
=== Weekly charts ===
Chart (2000)	Peak position
UK Albums (The Official Charts Company)	122
US Billboard 200	13
US Top R&B/Hip-Hop Albums (Billboard)	2

=== Year-end chart ===
Chart (2000)	Peak position
US Top R&B/Hip-Hop Albums	89

== Certifications ==
Region	Certification	Certified units/sales
United States (RIAA)	Gold	500,000^{^}
^{^} Shipments figures based on certification alone.

== Release history ==
Region	Date	Label	Format	Catalog
United States	August 1, 2000	Rawkus	CD	26136
United States	August 1, 2000	Rawkus	Cassette tape	26136
United States	August 1, 2000	Rawkus	LP	26136
