= Big L =

American rapper (1974–1999)

- Coleman in 1995

Background information
- Also known as: L Corleone
- Born: Lamont Coleman; May 30, 1974; New York City, U.S.
- Died: February 15, 1999 (aged 24) New York City, U.S.
- Cause of death: Drive-by shooting
- Genres: East Coast hip-hop; hardcore hip-hop; gangsta rap; horrorcore
- Occupations: Rapper; record executive; record producer
- Years active: 1992–1999
- Labels: Columbia; Sony; Rawkus; Priority; Flamboyant
- Formerly of: Children of the Corn; Diggin' in the Crates Crew; Three the Hard Way; The Wolfpack

Signature
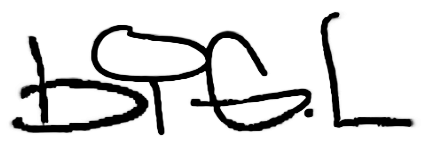

Lamont Coleman (May 30, 1974 – February 15, 1999), known professionally as Big L, was an American rapper and record producer. Emerging from Harlem in New York City in 1992, Big L became known among underground hip-hop fans for his freestyling ability. He was eventually signed to Columbia Records, where, in 1995, he released his debut studio album, Lifestylez ov da Poor & Dangerous.

Big L was noted for his use of wordplay, and writers at AllMusic, HipHopDX, and The Source have praised him for his lyrical ability. Henry Adaso described him as "one of the most talented poets in hip-hop history".

== Early life ==
Coleman was born on May 30, 1974, in the Harlem neighborhood of New York City. He was the third and youngest child of Gilda Terry (died 2008) and Charles Davis. Davis left the family while Coleman was a child. He had two older half-siblings: Donald and Leroy Phinazee (d. 2002). Coleman received the nicknames "Little L" and "Mont-Mont" as a child. His elder brother, Donald Phinazee, took Coleman to a Run-DMC concert at the Beacon Theatre when Coleman was about 7 years old. According to Phinazee, Coleman was awed by the performance which sparked his interest in rapping. By age 12, Coleman became a big hip-hop fan and started freestyling with other people in his neighborhood.

Coleman began writing rhymes in 1990. He also founded a group known as Three the Hard Way in 1990, but it was quickly broken up due to a lack of enthusiasm among the members which consisted of Coleman, Doc Reem, and Rodney. No projects were released, and after Rodney left, the group was renamed Two Hard Motherfuckers. Around this time, people started to refer to Coleman as "Big L". In the summer of 1990, Coleman met Lord Finesse at an autograph session in a record shop on 125th Street. After he did a freestyle, Coleman and Finesse exchanged numbers. In 1991, Coleman joined Lord Finesse's Bronx-based hip hop collective Diggin' in the Crates Crew.

Coleman attended Julia Richman High School and graduated in 1992. While in high school, Coleman freestyle battled regularly; in his last interview, he stated, "In the beginning, all I ever saw me doing was battling everybody on the street corners, rhyming in the hallways, beating on the wall, rhyming to my friends. Every now and then, a house party, grab the mic, a block party, grab the mic."

== Career ==
=== 1992–1995: First recordings and record deal ===
In 1992, Coleman recorded various demos, some of which were featured on his debut album Lifestylez ov da Poor & Dangerous. On February 11, Coleman appeared on Yo! MTV Raps with Lord Finesse to help promote Finesse's studio album Return of the Funky Man. Coleman's first professional appearance came on "Yes You May (Remix)", the B-side of "Party Over Here" (1992) by Lord Finesse, and his first album appearance was on "Represent", on Showbiz & A.G.'s Runaway Slave (1992).

During this time, he won an amateur freestyle battle hosted by Nubian Productions which consisted of about 2,000 contestants. In 1993, Coleman signed to Columbia Records before releasing his first promotional single, "Devil's Son"; he later said it was one of the first horrorcore singles, influencing others, and that he wrote the song because he had "always been a fan of horror flicks. Plus the things I see in Harlem are very scary. So I just put it all together in a rhyme." However, he said he preferred other styles over horrorcore.

In 1993, Coleman founded the Harlem rap group Children of the Corn with Killa Cam, Murda Mase, Herb McGruff, Bloodshed and producer Six Figga Digga. On February 18, 1993, he performed live at the Uptown Lord Finesse Birthday Bash at the 2,000 Club, which included other performances from Fat Joe, Nas, and Diamond D. In 1994, he released his second promotional single "I Shoulda Used a Rubba (Clinic)". On July 11, 1994, Coleman released the radio edit of "Put It On", followed up by the release of the music video three months later. In 1995, the music video for the single "No Endz, No Skinz" debuted.

His debut studio album, Lifestylez ov da Poor & Dangerous, was released in March 1995. The album debuted at number 149 on the Billboard 200 and number 22 on Top R&B/Hip-Hop Albums. Lifestylez would go on to sell over 200,000 copies as of 2000. Three singles were released from the album; the first two, "Put It On" and "M.V.P.", reached the top 25 of Billboard's Hot Rap Tracks and the third "No Endz, No Skinz" did not chart.

=== 1996–1999: Independent releases ===
In early 1996, Big L was dropped from Columbia mainly because of a dispute with the label over artistic differences and he signed with D.I.T.C. to Tommy Boy Records. He stated, "I was there with a bunch of strangers that didn't really know my music."

In 1997, he started working on his second studio album, The Big Picture. COC folded when Bloodshed died in a car accident in New York on March 2, 1997. Later that year, DITC appeared in the July issue of On The Go Magazine. Coleman then appeared on O.C.'s single "Dangerous" from O.C.'s second album Jewelz. That November, he was the opening act for O.C.'s European Jewlez Tour.

In 1998, Big L formed his own independent label, Flamboyant Entertainment. According to The Village Voice, it "planned to distribute the kind of hip-hop that sold without top 40 samples or R & B hooks." That same year, Coleman released the single "Ebonics". The song, based on African-American Vernacular English, was called one of the top five independent singles of the year by The Source. In May 1998, DITC released their first single, "Dignified Soldiers". That September, Big L was featured in XXL's iconic A Great Day in Hip Hop photograph, a replica of A Great Day in Harlem.

Following the release of "Ebonics", Big L caught the eye of Damon Dash, the CEO of Roc-A-Fella Records. Dash offered to sign him to Roc-A-Fella, but Big L wanted his crew to sign as well. On February 8, 1999, Coleman, Herb McGruff, C-Town, and Jay-Z started the process to sign with Roc-A-Fella as a group called "The Wolfpack".

== Murder and aftermath ==
On February 15, 1999, Coleman was killed in a drive-by shooting at 45 West 139th Street in his native Harlem. He was hit nine times in the face and chest. His death was reported three days later. Gerard Woodley, one of Coleman's childhood friends, was arrested three months later for the crime. "It's a good possibility it was retaliation for something Big L's brother did, or Woodley believed he had done," said a spokesperson for the New York City Police Department. Woodley was later released due to lack of evidence, and the murder case remains a cold case.

Woodley was fatally shot in the head on June 24, 2016. Woodley's family maintains his innocence in Coleman's killing. Rapper Cam'ron, who was a close friend of Coleman and Woodley, posted a video to Instagram claiming Coleman had attempted to kill Woodley a week before his death.

In June 2017, Woodley's cousin Lou Black self-published a book titled Ethylene: The Rise and Fall of The 139th St. NFL Crew, which detailed his firsthand interactions with Coleman and the Harlem street gang The NFL Crew. Black claimed that Leroy "Big Lee" Phinazee, the gang's leader and Coleman's eldest half-brother, was imprisoned for a probation violation when he contracted a Brooklyn-based hitman for the murder of three gang members, including Woodley. Phinazee then tasked Coleman with identifying the targets to the hitman. On the planned day of the murder, Woodley noticed the hitman following him and scared him off. As Coleman had been seen multiple times with the alleged hitman days prior, Woodley assumed Coleman had taken part in the failed shooting attempt. One week later, Coleman was killed, but his assailant was not specified in the book.

Coleman is buried at George Washington Memorial Park in Paramus, New Jersey.

== Posthumous releases ==
The tracks "Get Yours", "Way of Life", and "Shyheim's Manchild" b/w "Furious Anger" were released as singles in 1999 for DITC's self-titled album (2000) on Tommy Boy Records. The album peaked at number 31 on R&B/Hip-Hop Albums and number 141 on the Billboard 200. Coleman's first posthumous single was "Flamboyant" b/w "On the Mic", which arrived on May 30, 2000. The single peaked at number 39 on the Billboard Hot R&B/Hip-Hop Songs and topped the Hot Rap Tracks, making it Coleman's first and only number-one single.

Coleman's second and final studio album, The Big Picture, was released on August 1, 2000, and featured Fat Joe, Tupac Shakur, Guru of Gang Starr, Kool G Rap, and Big Daddy Kane among others. The Big Picture was put together by his manager and partner in Flamboyant Entertainment, Rich King. It contains songs that he had recorded and a cappella recordings that were never used, completed by producers and guest emcees that Coleman respected or had worked with previously.

The Big Picture debuted at number 13 on the Billboard 200, number two on Top R&B/Hip-Hop Albums, and sold 72,549 copies. The album was certified gold a month later for shipments of 500,000 copies by the RIAA. The Big Picture was the only music by Big L to appear on a music chart outside of the United States, peaking at number 122 on the UK Albums Chart.

Children of the Corn: The Collector's Edition, a compilation album containing COC songs, was released in 2003. Big L's next posthumous album, 139 & Lenox, was released on August 31, 2010. Issued by Rich King on Flamboyant Entertainment, it contained previously unreleased and rare tracks. The follow-up album, Return of the Devil's Son (2010), peaked at number 73 on R&B/Hip-Hop Albums. Coleman's next release was The Danger Zone (2011).

On April 16, 2025, rapper Nas announced the Legend Has It seven-album series, including Coleman alongside peer rappers Ghostface Killah, Raekwon, Mobb Deep, De La Soul, and Slick Rick, as well as Nas on his collaboration album with DJ Premier. The following day, Coleman's family confirmed his final album with the title, Harlem's Finest: Return of the King, and was released on October 31, 2025. They've also stated that various posthumous Big L songs have been removed from streaming services in the past few years due to being unmixed, containing uncleared samples, and producers not being credited.

== Legacy and influence ==
Henry Adaso, a music journalist for About.com, called him the 23rd-best MC of 1987 to 2007, claiming "[he was] one of the most auspicious storytellers in hip hop history." HipHopDX called Coleman "the most underrated lyricist ever". Many tributes have been given to Coleman. The first was by Lord Finesse and the other members of DITC on March 6, 1999, at the Tramps. The Source has done multiple tributes to him: first in July 2000, and then in March 2002. XXL also did a tribute to Coleman in March 2003. On February 16, 2005, at SOB's restaurant and nightclub in Manhattan, a commemoration was held for him. It included special guests such as DITC, Herb McGruff, and Kid Capri. All the money earned went to his estate.

In 2004, Eminem paid tribute to Coleman in the music video for his single "Like Toy Soldiers". In an interview with MTV, Jay-Z stated: "We were about to sign him right before he passed away. We were about to sign him to Roc-a-Fella. It was a done deal…I think he was very talented…I think he had the ability to write big records, and big choruses." Rapper Nas also said on MTV, "He scared me to death. When I heard that on tape, I was scared to death. I said, 'Yo, it's no way I can compete if this is what I gotta compete with.'"

In 2017, Royce da 5'9" said he believed Coleman would have been a "top 3" rapper all time if he had not been killed so prematurely. In 2019, Funkmaster Flex said "People can get mad at me for saying this, but he was the best lyricist at the time. He was a better lyricist than Biggie and Jay-Z. He just didn't have the marketing and promotion. Let me go on the record and say that. It's the truth." In 2022, the 140th Street and Lennox Avenue intersection in Harlem was co-named Lamont "Big L" Coleman Way.

=== Style ===
"Ebonics"
In "Ebonics", one of Coleman's best-known tracks, he raps about the slang used in Harlem while he was growing up.

Coleman is often credited in helping to create the horrorcore genre of hip hop with his 1992 song "Devil's Son." However, not all his songs fall into this genre. For example, in the song "Street Struck," Coleman discusses the difficulties of growing up in the ghetto and describes the consequences of living a life of crime. Idris Goodwin of The Boston Globe wrote that "[Big L had an] impressive command of the English language", with his song "Ebonics" being the best example of this.

Coleman was notable for using a rap style called "compounding". He also used metaphors in his rhymes. M.F. DiBella of Allmusic stated Coleman was "a master of the lyrical stickup undressing his competition with kinetic metaphors and a brash comedic repertoire". On the review of The Big Picture, she adds, describing "the Harlem MC as a master of the punch line and a vicious storyteller with a razor blade-under-the-tongue flow." Trent Fitzgerald of Allmusic said Coleman was "a lyrically ferocious MC with raps deadlier than a snakebite and mannerisms cooler than the uptown pimp he claimed to be on records."

=== Documentary ===
A documentary Street Struck: The Big L Story was set to be released in 2017. Directed by a childhood friend and independent film director, Jewlz, approximately nine hours of footage was brought in, and the film's planned runtime was said to be 90 to 120 minutes long. Released on August 29, 2009, the first trailer detailed that Street Struck would contain interviews from his mother Gilda Terry; his brother Donald; childhood friends E-Cash, D.O.C., McGruff, and Stan Spit; artists Mysonne and Doug E. Fresh; producers Showbiz and Premier; and recording DJs Cipha Sounds and Peter Rosenberg. Put together by Coleman's brother Donald, a soundtrack was said to have been made for the documentary as well. As of 2024, both the documentary and soundtrack have yet to be released.

== Discography ==
Year	Official Album(s)
1995	Lifestylez ov da Poor & Dangerous
2000	The Big Picture (posthumous)
2010	139 & Lenox (posthumous)
2011	The Danger Zone (posthumous)
2025	Harlem's Finest: Return of the King (posthumous)

== See also ==
- List of murdered hip hop musicians
- List of unsolved murders (1980–1999)
- List of people from Harlem

== Sources ==
- Hess, Mickey (2010). Hip Hop in America: A Regional Guide: Volume 1: East Coast and West Coast. ABC-CLIO. ISBN 978-0-313-34323-0.
- Jasper, Kenji (July 6, 1999). "Of Mics and Men in Harlem". The Village Voice. Archived from the original on August 10, 2013.
